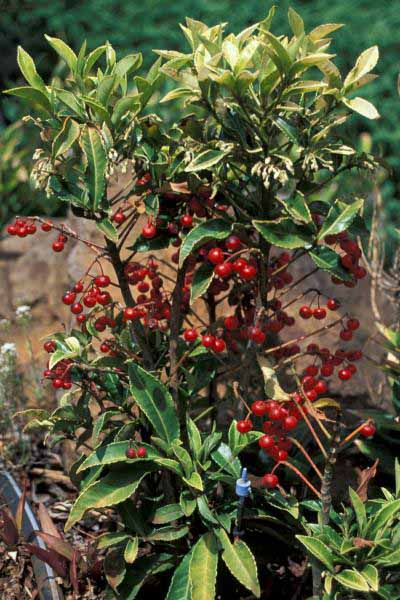
- Ardisia crenata

Scientific classification
- Kingdom: Plantae
- Clade: Tracheophytes
- Clade: Angiosperms
- Clade: Eudicots
- Clade: Asterids
- Order: Ericales
- Family: Primulaceae
- Subfamily: Myrsinoideae

Type genus
- Myrsine L.

Synonyms
- Ardisiaceae Juss.

= Myrsinoideae =

Subfamily of plants, including Cyclamen

Myrsinoideae is a subfamily of the family Primulaceae in the order Ericales. It was formerly recognized as the family Myrsinaceae, or the myrsine family, consisting of 35 genera and about 1000 species. It is widespread in temperate to tropical climates extending north to Europe, Siberia, Japan, Mexico, and Florida, and south to New Zealand, South America, and South Africa.

Plants are mostly mesophytic trees and shrubs; a few are lianas or subherbaceous. Their leathery, evergreen leaves are simple and alternate, with smooth margins and without stipules. They are often dotted with glands and resinous cavities. The latter may take the form of secretory lines.

The plants are mostly monoecious, but a few are dioecious. Their small flowers are arranged in racemose terminal clusters, or in the leaf axils. The flowers have four or five sepals and petals. The floral envelope (perianth) has a distinct calyx and corolla. The calyx is regular and polysepalous. The nonfleshy petals of the corolla are more or less united, closely overlapping. The four or five stamens are usually isomerous with the perianth. The carpel has one style and one stigma, with the ovary unilocular, superior or semi-inferior.

The one-seeded, indehiscent fruit is a thin-fleshed berry or drupe. North American species are the marlberry (Ardisia escalloniodes) and the Florida rapanea (Myrsine cubana).

Plants in the subfamily have few economic uses. A few genera, such as Ardisia, Cyclamen, Lysimachia, and Myrsine, are grown as ornamental plants, especially Ardisia crispa and Myrsine africana. One species, Ardisia japonica (Chinese: 紫金牛; pinyin: zǐjīn niú), is one of the 50 fundamental herbs in traditional Chinese medicine.

In the APG III system and onwards, the Myrsinaceae were not recognized, but were sunk into Primulaceae, which in that system is circumscribed very broadly.

== Genera ==
- Aegiceras
- Amblyanthopsis
- Amblyanthus
- Anagallis
- Antistrophe
- Ardisia
- Asterolinon (should be included into the Anagallis clade)
- Badula
- Conandrium
- Coris
- Ctenardisia
- Cybianthus
- Cyclamen
- Discocalyx
- Elingamita
- Embelia
- Emblemantha
- Fittingia
- Geissanthus
- Glaux (should be included into the clade Lysimachia)
- Heberdenia
- Hymenandra
- Labisia
- Loheria
- Lysimachia
- Monoporus
- Myrsine
- Oncostemum
- Parathesis
- Pelletiera (should be included into the Anagallis clade)
- Pleiomeris
- Rapanea
- Sadiria
- Solonia
- Stylogyne
- Tapeinosperma
- Trientalis
- Tetrardisia
- Vegaea
- Wallenia

The following genera, traditionally categorized in Primulaceae sensu lato, should, according to Källersjö et al. (2000), belong to the Myrsinoideae (the clade of Myrsinaceae s. l.): Anagallis, Ardisiandra, Asterolinon, Coris, Cyclamen, Glaux, Lysimachia, Pelletiera and Trientalis.
