= Amblyanthopsis bhotanica =

Scientific classification
- Kingdom: Plantae
- Clade: Tracheophytes
- Clade: Angiosperms
- Clade: Eudicots
- Clade: Asterids
- Order: Ericales
- Family: Primulaceae
- Genus: Amblyanthopsis
- Species: A. bhotanica

Binomial name
- Amblyanthopsis bhotanica (C.B.Clarke) Mez

Synonyms
- Ardisia bhotanica C.B.Clarke; Tinus bhotanica (C.B.Clarke) Kuntze

Species of flowering plant

Amblyanthopsis bhotanica is a species of flowering plant in the primrose family (Primulaceae). It is native to Bhutan.

Amblyanthopsis bhotanica was first formally described as Ardisia bhotanica in 1882 by Charles Baron Clarke. It was transferred to the genus Amblyanthopsis by Carl Christian Mez in 1902. It is one of three species in that genus.
