= Labisia pumila =

Scientific classification
- Kingdom: Plantae
- Clade: Tracheophytes
- Clade: Angiosperms
- Clade: Eudicots
- Clade: Asterids
- Order: Ericales
- Family: Primulaceae
- Genus: Labisia
- Species: L. pumila

Binomial name
- Labisia pumila (Blume) Fern.-Vill.

Synonyms
- Angiopetalum punctatum Reinw. Ardisia malouiana (L.Linden & Rodigas) Markgr. Ardisia pumila Blume; Ardisia spicata Wall. ex A.DC. Labisia pothoina Lindl. Labisia punctata (Reinw.) Airy Shaw Marantodes pumilum (Blume) Kuntze

Species of plant

Labisia pumila (kacip Fatimah, /ˈkɑːtʃɪpfɑːtɪmɑː/) is a flowering plant in the family Primulaceae native to Malaysia. It is a small, woody and leafy plant with leaves of 20 cm (7.9 in) in length, and grows widely in the shade of the tropical forest floor. The plant is popular in the traditional medicine of the Malaysian and Indonesian community, in which it is believed to be the female version of the equally well-known tongkat Ali, i.e. Ali's walking stick.

== Description ==
Labisia is a herbaceous plant that grows in low clusters, with solitary or rarely branching stems and fine, hairy roots. The leaves are oblong-shaped, hairy on its underside and can grow to 20–40 cm (7.9–15.7 in) in length. The inflorescence are brown and 5–6 cm (2.0–2.4 in) long. The plant thrives under the shade, away from direct sunlight, and grows well in moist or loamy soil. It propagates by its rhizomes, leaves and/or seeds, and when cultivated is harvested about a year after planting. The plant is indigenous to Malaysia, but also found in Sumatra, Java and Borneo. Three varieties of Labisia pumila have been described: var. alata, var. lanceolata and var. pumila.

The popular name for the plant is kacip Fatimah ("Fatimah's betel cutter"; compare to tongkat ali, i.e. Ali's walking stick). Other common names of the plant include selusoh Fatimah, pokok pinggan, rumput palis, tadah matahari, mata pelanduk rimba, bunga belungkas hutan, remoyan batu, and angkoh.

== Uses ==
In folk medicine L. pumila was thought to be useful for a number of applications, including labor induction and treating venereal disease and flatulence. The plant has been researched for use in making cosmeceutical products.

The plant's extract has been commercially formulated for consumption in capsule and tablet form, as well as an ingredient in energy drinks. In Malaysia Labisia pumila was highlighted in 2010 as one of five local herbs to developed commercially on a large scale via the Economic Transformation Programme.

== Chemical constituents ==
Despite its long history of traditional use, the active components and mode of action have not been well studied, though some preliminary research has been published. It has been reported that Labisia contains two novel benzoquinoid compounds, as well as gallic acid, caffeic acid, rutin, and myricetin. One study claims that the leaves contain significantly higher level of saponins compared to its stems and roots.
