= C. monspeliensis =

C. monspeliensis may refer to:

- Cistus monspeliensis, the Montpelier cistus, a plant species native to southern Europe and northern Africa
- Coris monspeliensis, a plant species
