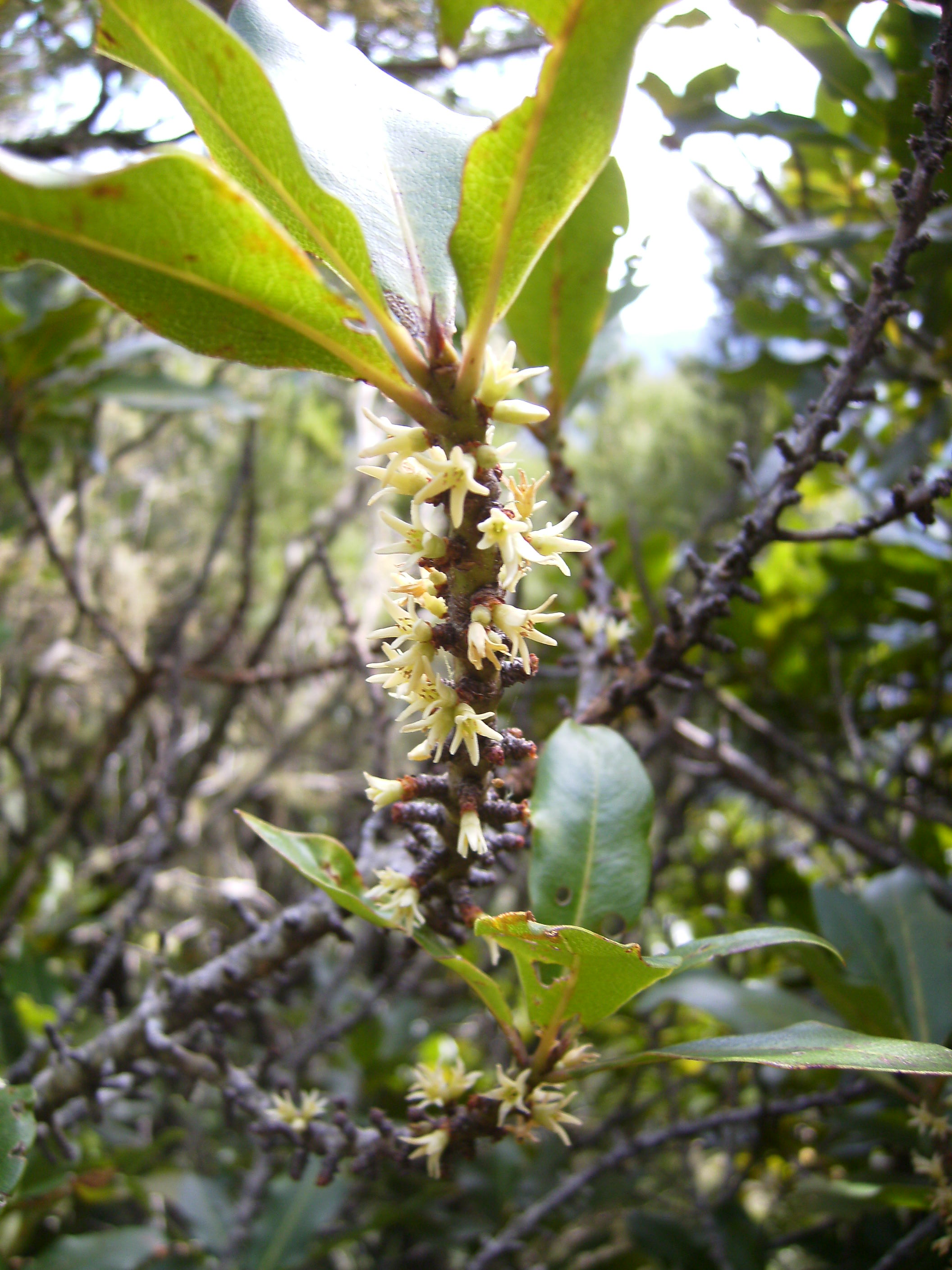
- Branchlet with leaves and flowers.

Conservation status
- Critically Endangered (IUCN 3.1)

Scientific classification
- Kingdom: Plantae
- Clade: Tracheophytes
- Clade: Angiosperms
- Clade: Eudicots
- Clade: Asterids
- Order: Ericales
- Family: Primulaceae
- Genus: Pleiomeris
- Species: P. canariensis

Binomial name
- Pleiomeris canariensis (Willd.) A.DC.

= Pleiomeris canariensis =

Species of flowering plant

Pleiomeris canariensis is a species of plant in the family Primulaceae. It is endemic to Canary Islands, Spain.
