= Amblyanthus (plant) =

Amblyanthus is the name or synonym of a plant genus that may refer to:

- Amblyanthus A.DC., a genus in the family Primulaceae
- Amblyanthus (Schltr.) Brieger, a synonym of Dendrobium
