= Monoporus =

Monoporus may refer to:

- Monoporus (plant), a genus of plants in the family Primulaceae
- Monoporus, a genus of branchiopods in the family Chydoridae, synonym of Monope
- Monoporus, a genus of worms in the family Otocelididae, synonym of Otocelis
