= Stylogyne darienensis =

Conservation status
- Data Deficient (IUCN 3.1)

Scientific classification
- Kingdom: Plantae
- Clade: Tracheophytes
- Clade: Angiosperms
- Clade: Eudicots
- Clade: Asterids
- Order: Ericales
- Family: Primulaceae
- Genus: Stylogyne
- Species: S. darienensis

Binomial name
- Stylogyne darienensis Lundell

Species of flowering plant

Stylogyne darienensis is a species of flowering plant in the family Primulaceae. It is endemic to Panama.
