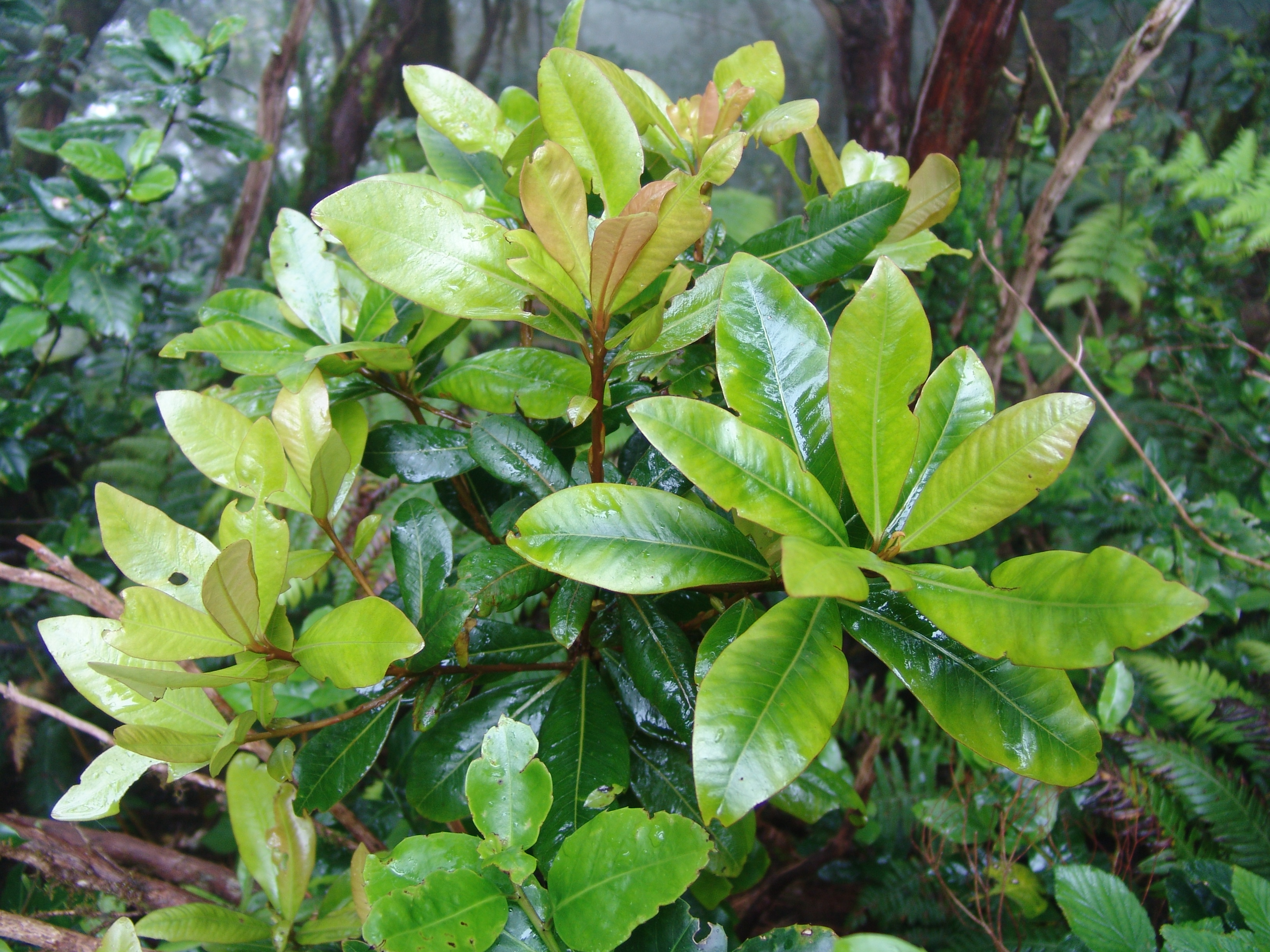

Conservation status
- Vulnerable (IUCN 3.1)

Scientific classification
- Kingdom: Plantae
- Clade: Tracheophytes
- Clade: Angiosperms
- Clade: Eudicots
- Clade: Asterids
- Order: Ericales
- Family: Primulaceae
- Genus: Heberdenia
- Species: H. excelsa

Binomial name
- Heberdenia excelsa (Ait.) Banks

Synonyms
- Heberdenia bahamensis

= Heberdenia excelsa =

Species of tree

Heberdenia excelsa is a species of plant in the family Primulaceae. It is found in the Macaronesian archipelagoes of Madeira and the Canary Islands. It is threatened by habitat loss.
