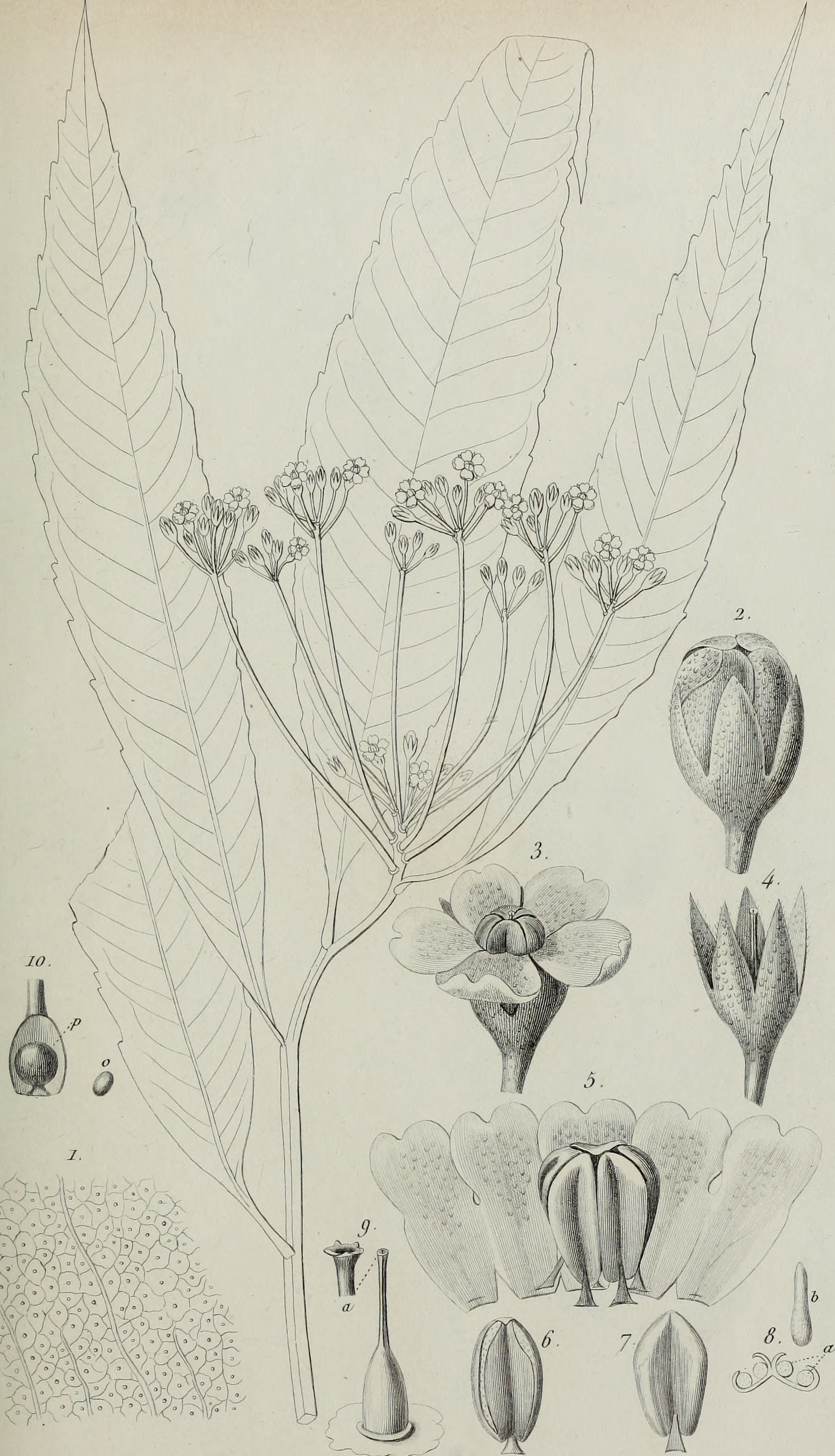
- Botanical illustration of Amblyanthus glandulosus

Scientific classification
- Kingdom: Plantae
- Clade: Tracheophytes
- Clade: Angiosperms
- Clade: Eudicots
- Clade: Asterids
- Order: Ericales
- Family: Primulaceae
- Subfamily: Myrsinoideae
- Genus: Amblyanthus; A.DC.

Species
- See text

= Amblyanthus =

Genus of plants in the primrose family

Amblyanthus is a small genus of flowering plants in the family Primulaceae, native to Bangladesh, Assam, and the eastern Himalayas. It is a poorly studied genus, closely related to Ardisia and Amblyanthopsis.

== Species ==
The following species are accepted:

- Amblyanthus glandulosus (Roxb.) A.DC.
- Amblyanthus multiflorus Mez
- Amblyanthus obovatus G.S.Giri, S.K.Das & H.J.Chowdhery
- Amblyanthus praetervisus Mez
