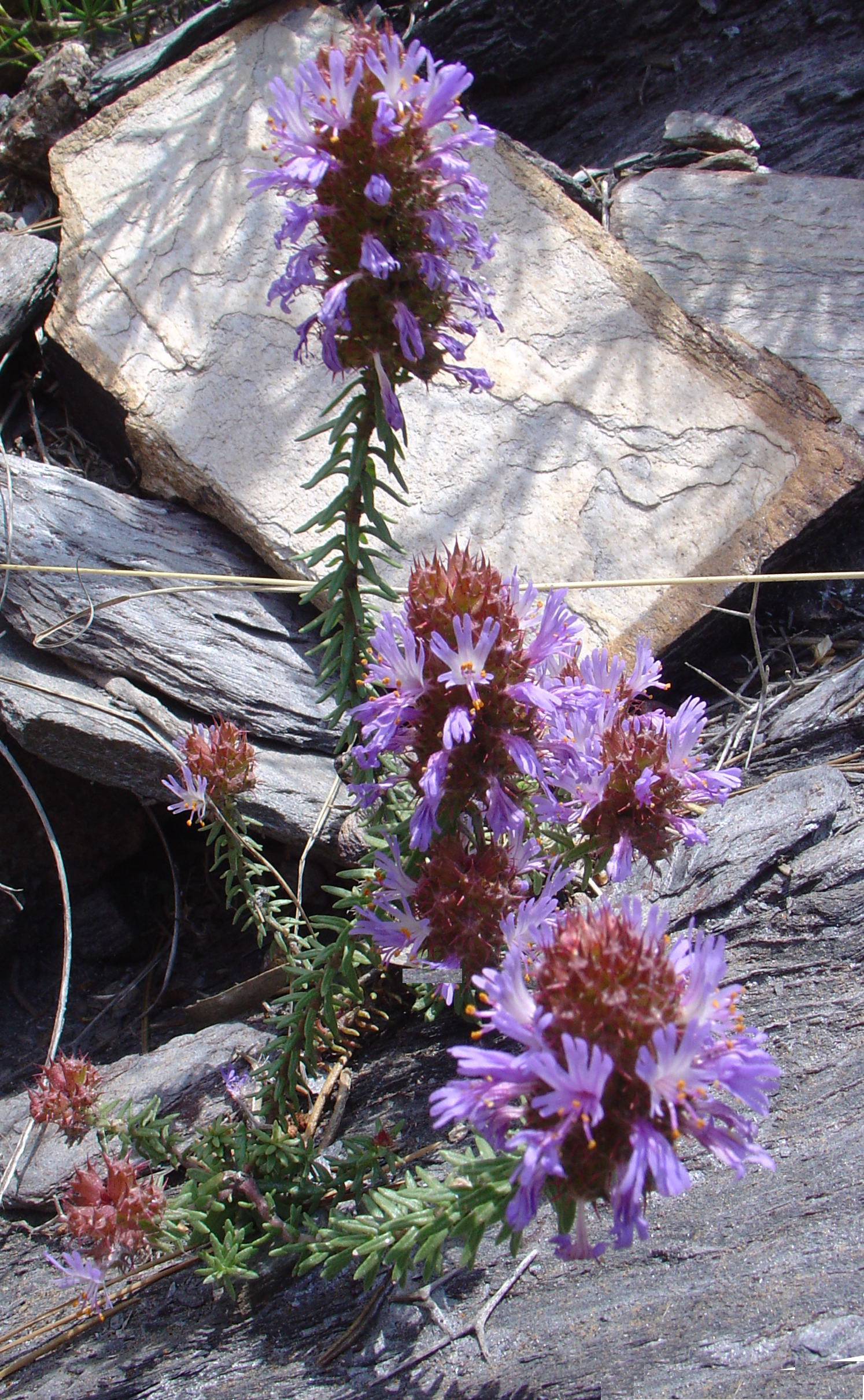
- Coris monspeliensis

Scientific classification
- Kingdom: Plantae
- Clade: Tracheophytes
- Clade: Angiosperms
- Clade: Eudicots
- Clade: Asterids
- Order: Ericales
- Family: Primulaceae
- Subfamily: Myrsinoideae
- Genus: Coris; L. Species Plantarum 1: 177. 1753.

Species
- Coris hispanica Coris monspeliensis

= Coris (plant) =

Genus of flowering plants

Coris is a plant genus in the family Primulaceae.
