= Mangenotiella =

Scientific classification
- Kingdom: Plantae
- Clade: Tracheophytes
- Clade: Angiosperms
- Clade: Eudicots
- Clade: Asterids
- Order: Ericales
- Family: Primulaceae
- Genus: Mangenotiella; M.Schmid
- Species: M. stellata

Binomial name
- Mangenotiella stellata M.Schmid

Genus of shrubs

Mangenotiella is a monotypic genus of shrub in the family Primulaceae. Its only species is Mangenotiella stellata, endemic to New Caledonia.

The genus name of Mangenotiella is in honour of Georges Marie Mangenot (1899–1985), who was a French botanist and Professor of Botany.

The genus and species were circumscribed by Maurice Schmid in Adansonia, sér.3, vol.34 on pages 338-340 in 2012.
