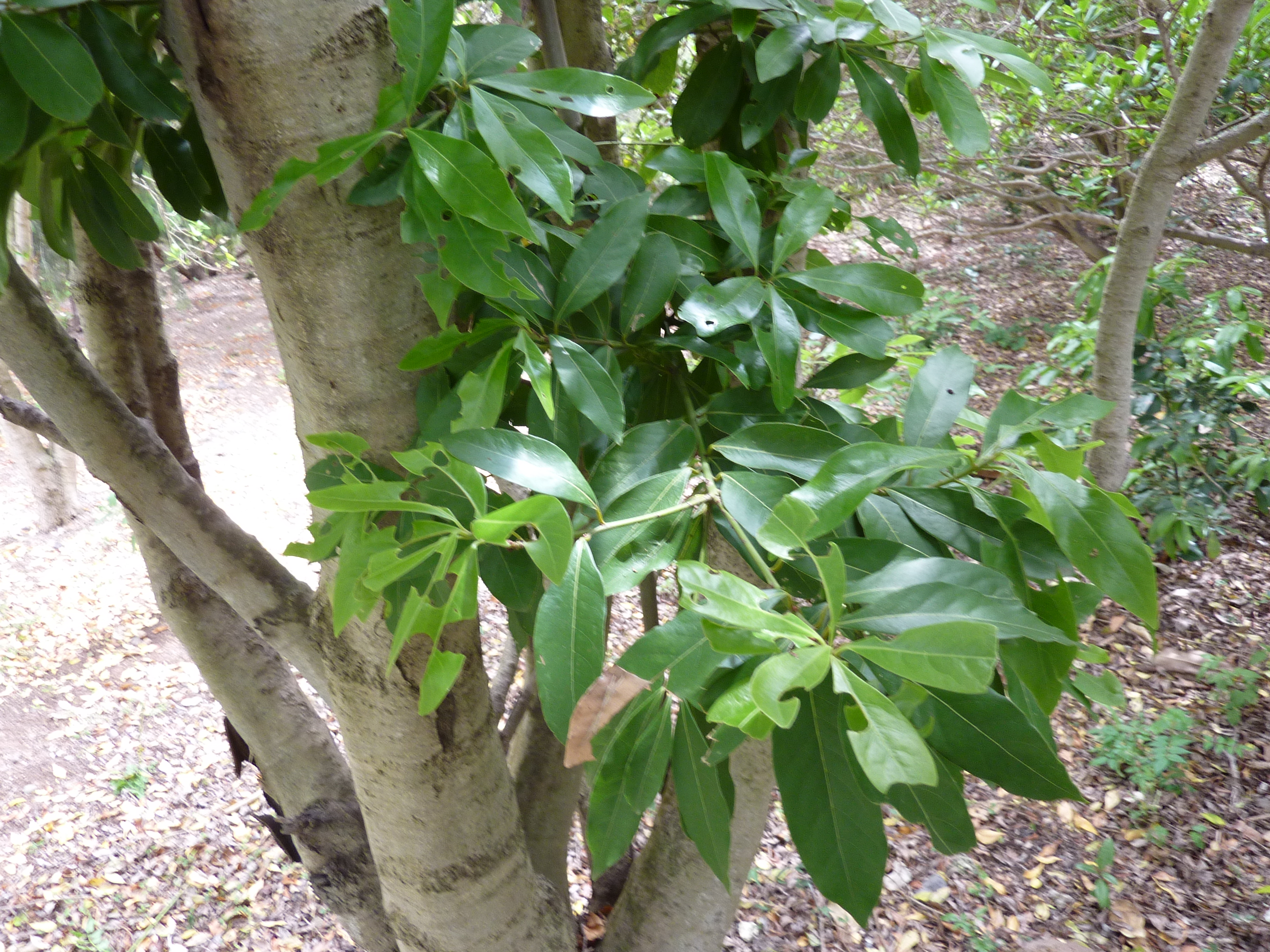
- Heberdenia excelsa

Scientific classification
- Kingdom: Plantae
- Clade: Tracheophytes
- Clade: Angiosperms
- Clade: Eudicots
- Clade: Asterids
- Order: Ericales
- Family: Primulaceae
- Subfamily: Myrsinoideae
- Genus: Heberdenia; Banks ex A.DC.

= Heberdenia =

Genus of flowering plants

Heberdenia is a genus of plant in the family Primulaceae. It contains the following species (but this list may be incomplete):

- Heberdenia excelsa (Ait.) Banks
