= Paralysimachia =

Scientific classification
- Kingdom: Plantae
- Clade: Tracheophytes
- Clade: Angiosperms
- Clade: Eudicots
- Clade: Asterids
- Order: Ericales
- Family: Primulaceae
- Genus: Paralysimachia; F.Du, J.Wang & S.Y.Yang (2016)
- Species: P. xueshanensis

Binomial name
- Paralysimachia xueshanensis F.Du, J.Wang & S.Y.Yang (2016)

Genus of flowering plants

Paralysimachia xueshanensis is a species of flowering plant in the primula family, Primulaceae. It is endemic to Yunnan province of south-central China. It is the sole species in genus Paralysimachia.
