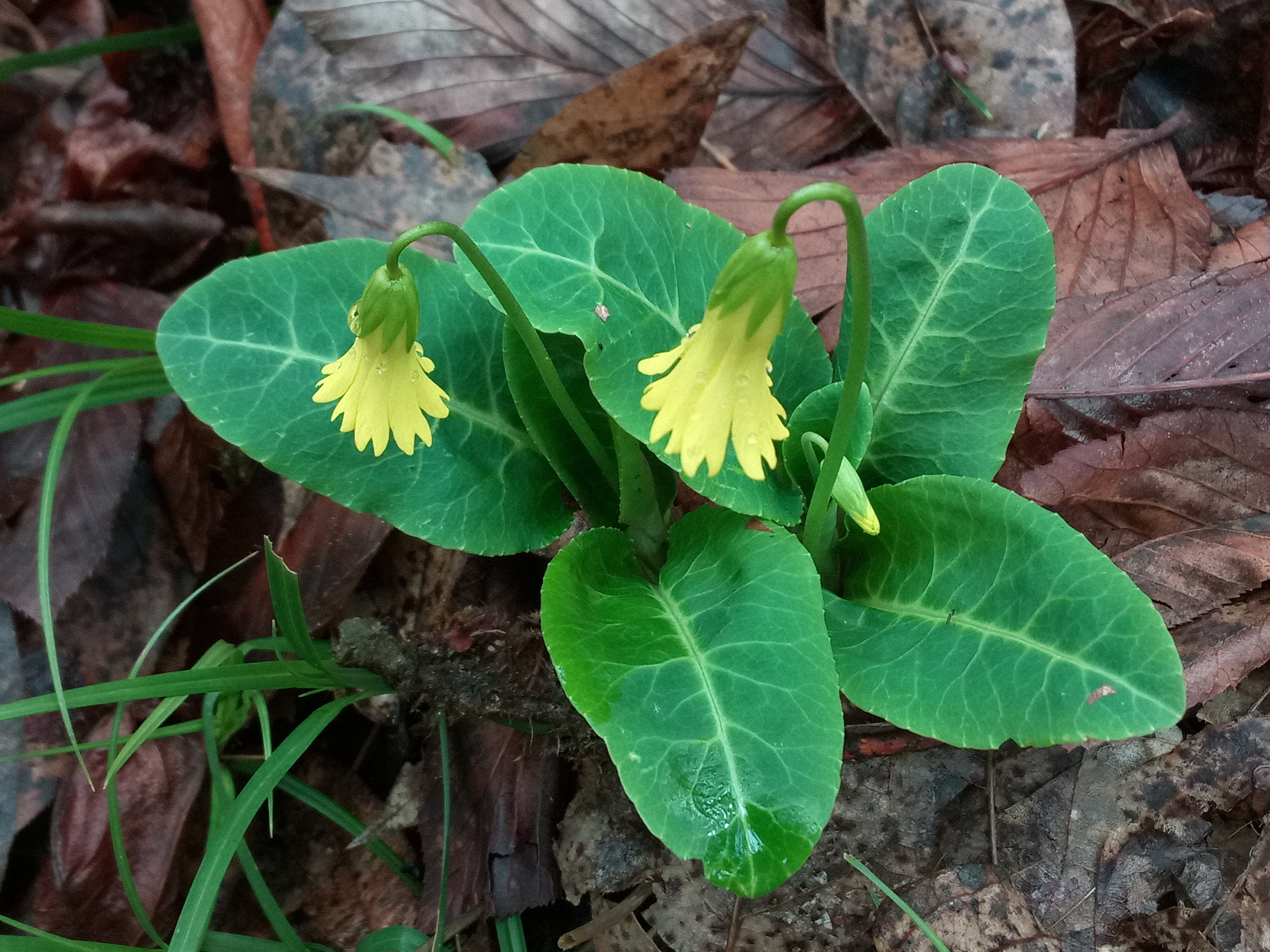
- Bryocarpum himalaicum in Bhutan

Scientific classification
- Kingdom: Plantae
- Clade: Tracheophytes
- Clade: Angiosperms
- Clade: Eudicots
- Clade: Asterids
- Order: Ericales
- Family: Primulaceae
- Genus: Bryocarpum; Hook.f. & Thomson (1857)
- Species: B. himalaicum

Binomial name
- Bryocarpum himalaicum Hook.f. & Thomson (1857)

= Bryocarpum =

Genus of flowering plants

Bryocarpum himalaicum is a species of flowering plant belonging to the family Primulaceae. It is the sole species in genus Bryocarpum. It is a perennial native to the Himalayas, from eastern Nepal to Bhutan and southeastern Tibet.
