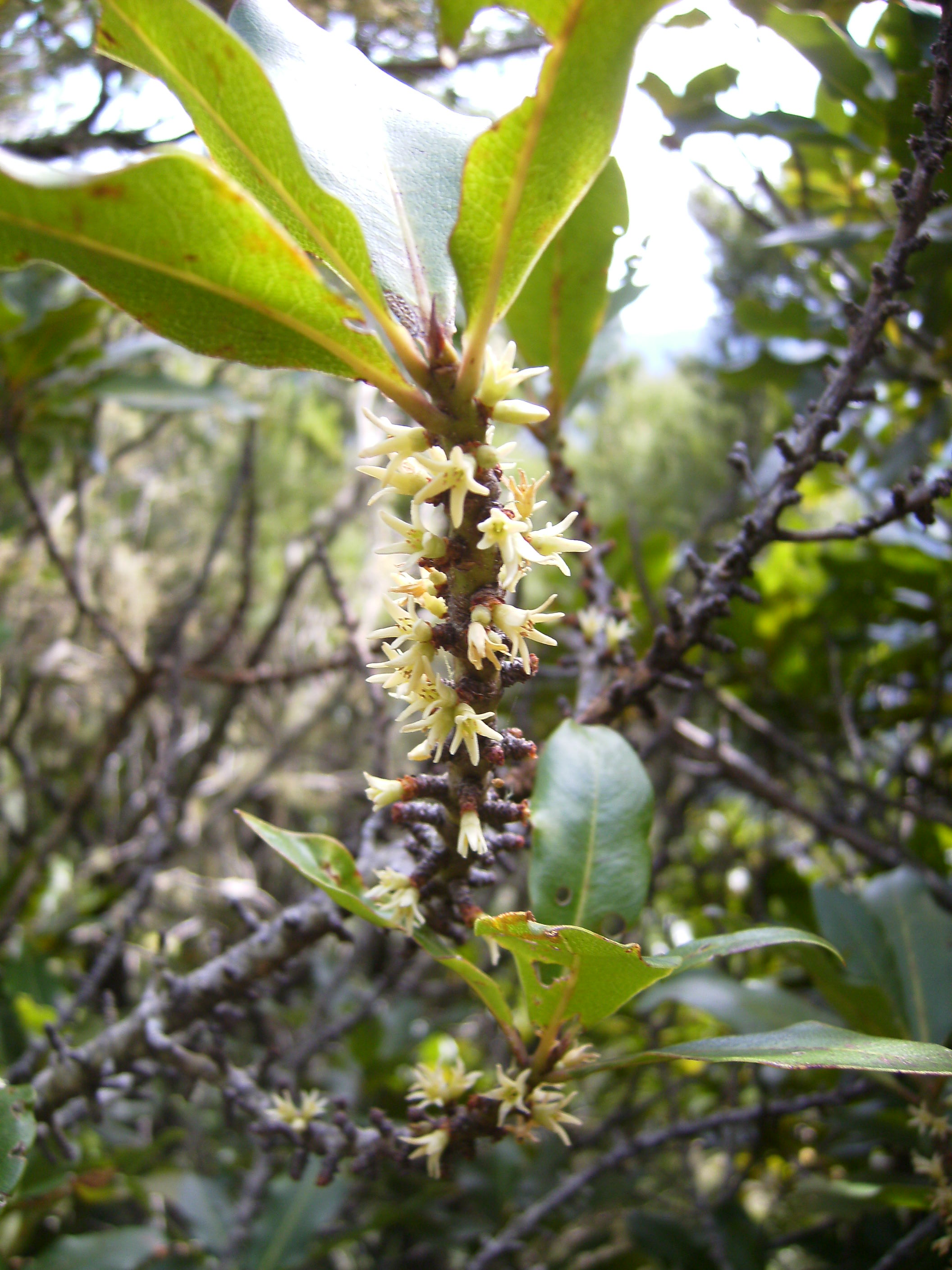
- Pleiomeris canariensis

Scientific classification
- Kingdom: Plantae
- Clade: Tracheophytes
- Clade: Angiosperms
- Clade: Eudicots
- Clade: Asterids
- Order: Ericales
- Family: Primulaceae
- Subfamily: Myrsinoideae
- Genus: Pleiomeris; A.DC.

= Pleiomeris =

Genus of flowering plants

Pleiomeris is a genus of plants in the family Primulaceae. It contains the following species (but this list may be incomplete):

- Pleiomeris canariensis (Willd.) A.DC.
