= Antistrophe (plant) =

Scientific classification
- Kingdom: Plantae
- Clade: Tracheophytes
- Clade: Angiosperms
- Clade: Eudicots
- Clade: Asterids
- Order: Ericales
- Family: Primulaceae
- Subfamily: Myrsinoideae
- Genus: Antistrophe; A.DC. (1841)

Species
- Antistrophe caudata King & Gamble; Antistrophe curtisii King & Gamble; Antistrophe glabra A.G.Pandurangan & V.J.Nair; Antistrophe oxyantha (Wall. ex A.DC.) A.DC.; Antistrophe serratifolia (Bedd.) Hook.f.; Antistrophe solanoides (King & Gamble) M.P.Nayar & G.S.Giri

Species of flowering plant

Antistrophe is a genus of flowering plants in the primula family, Primulaceae. It includes six species of shrubs native to southern and southeastern Asia, including the Indian subcontinent, Vietnam, and Peninsular Malaysia.

== Species ==
Six species are accepted.

- Antistrophe caudata King & Gamble – southern Vietnam and Peninsular Malaysia
- Antistrophe curtisii King & Gamble – Peninsular Malaysia
- Antistrophe glabra A.G.Pandurangan & V.J.Nair – southwestern India (Kerala)
- Antistrophe oxyantha (Wall. ex A.DC.) A.DC. – eastern Himalayas to Bangladesh
- Antistrophe serratifolia (Bedd.) Hook.f. – India
- Antistrophe solanoides (King & Gamble) M.P.Nayar & G.S.Giri – Peninsular Malaysia (Perak)
