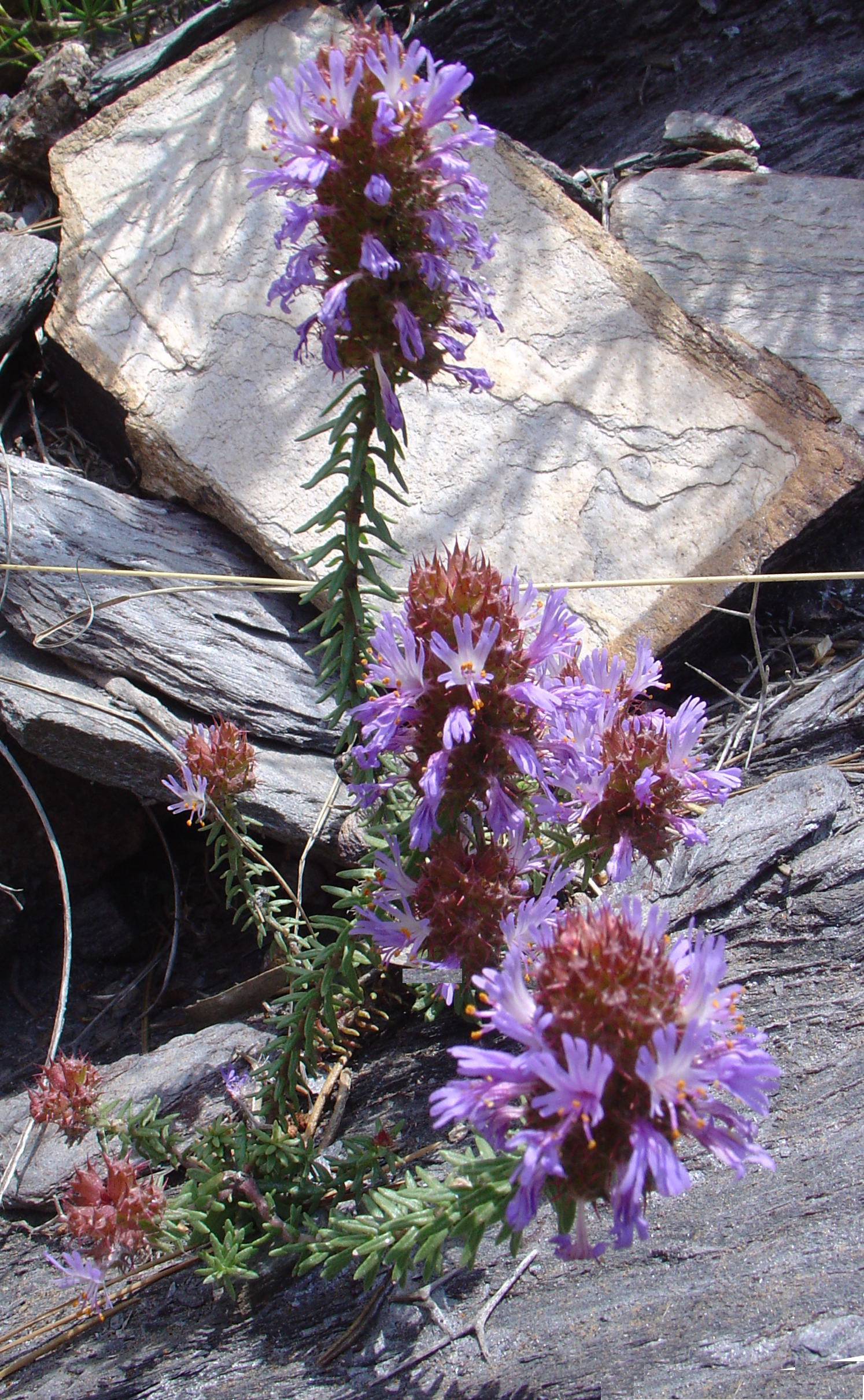

Scientific classification
- Kingdom: Plantae
- Clade: Tracheophytes
- Clade: Angiosperms
- Clade: Eudicots
- Clade: Asterids
- Order: Ericales
- Family: Primulaceae
- Genus: Coris
- Species: C. monspeliensis

Binomial name
- Coris monspeliensis L.

Subspecies
- C. m. subsp. fontqueri C. m. subsp. monspeliensis C. m. subsp. syrtica

= Coris monspeliensis =

Species of flowering plant

Coris monspeliensis, also known as Montpelier [sic] coris, a plant species in the primrose family, has erect or ascending stems which are woody at the base and densely covered with foliage. The leathery linear leaves, which grow up to 20 mm long are alternate and stalkless. They may be hairless or hairy and the highest leaves often have small teeth. The flowers with 5 unequal petals, each deeply lobed are borne in short dense clusters and vary in color from pink to blue. Each flower measures up to 12 mm across and has narrow, widely spread petals. The calyx is bell shaped and has up to 20 red or black spiny teeth. The spherical capsule is up to 2 mm in diameter.

== Distribution ==
Central Mediterranean including N.W. Africa.

== Habitat ==
Dry coastal areas.

== Gallery ==
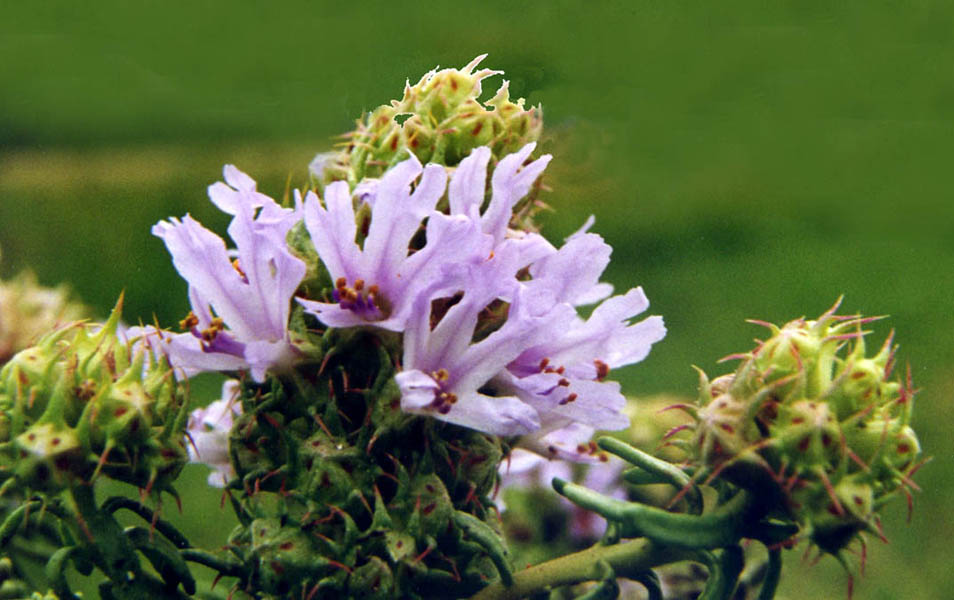

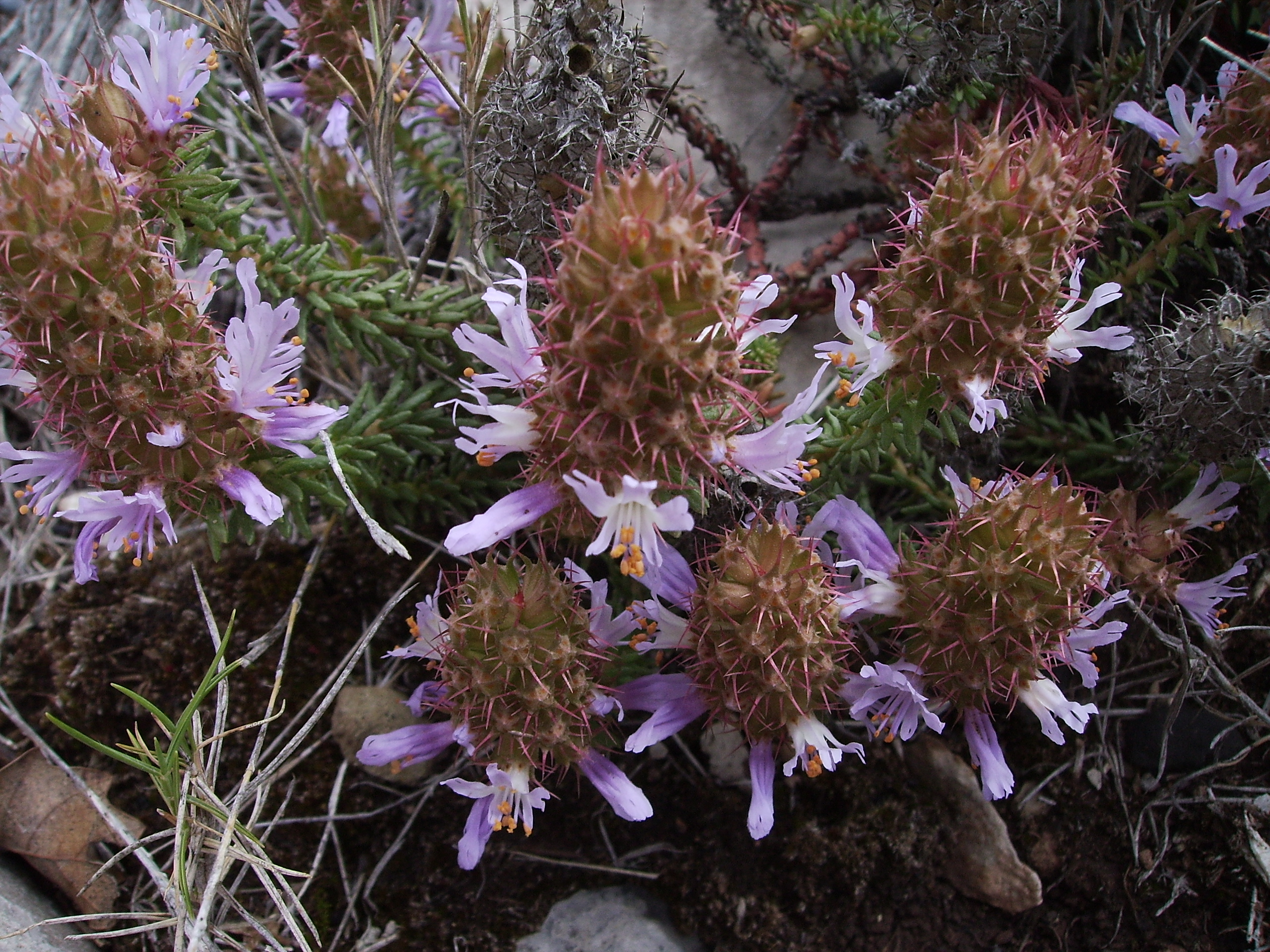

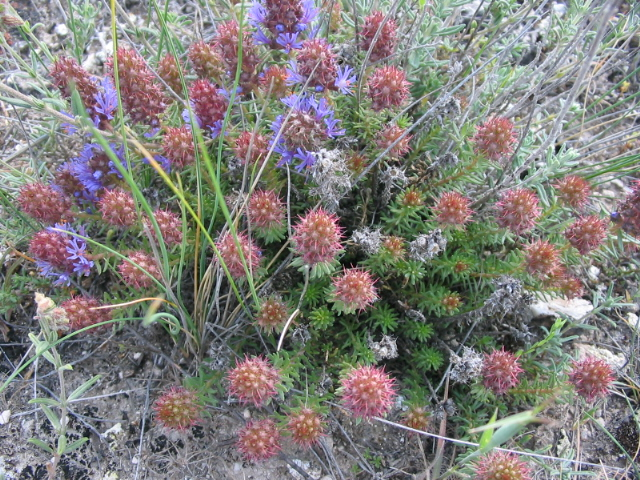

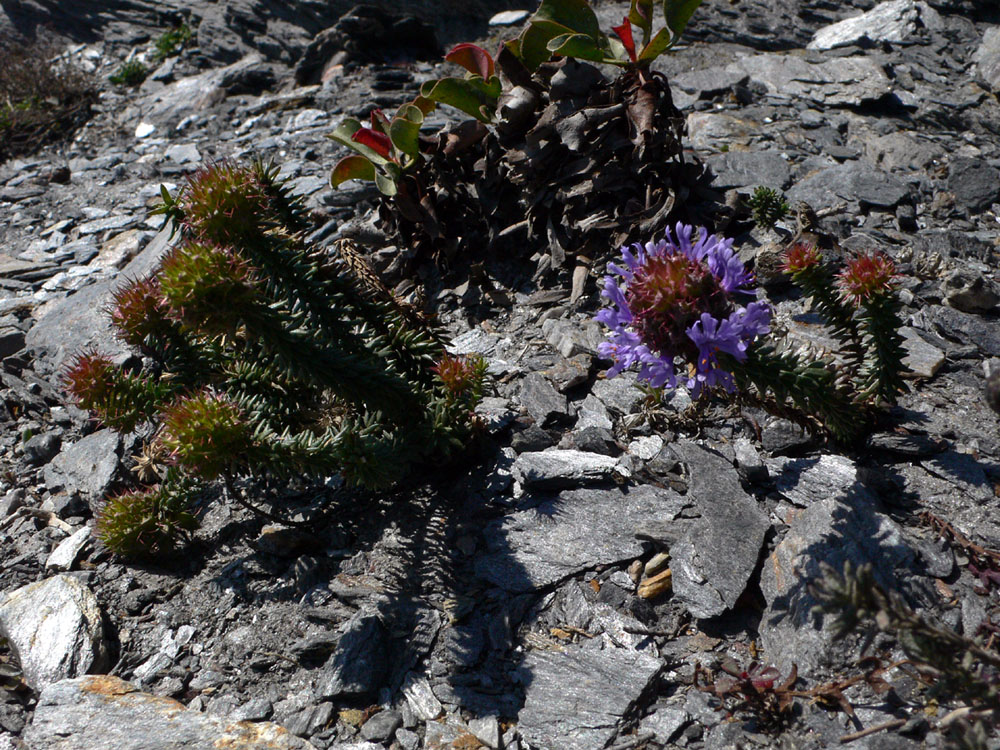

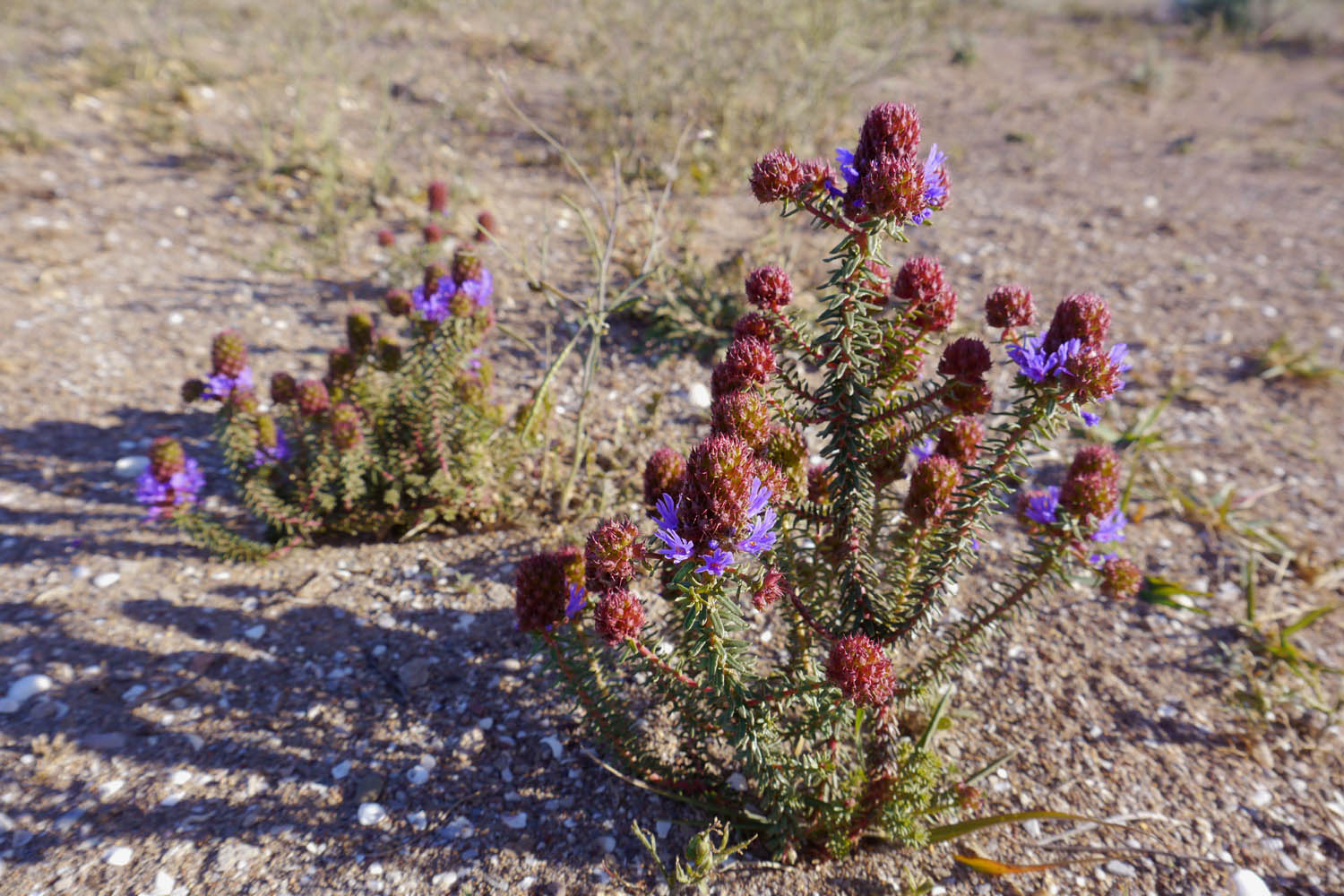
