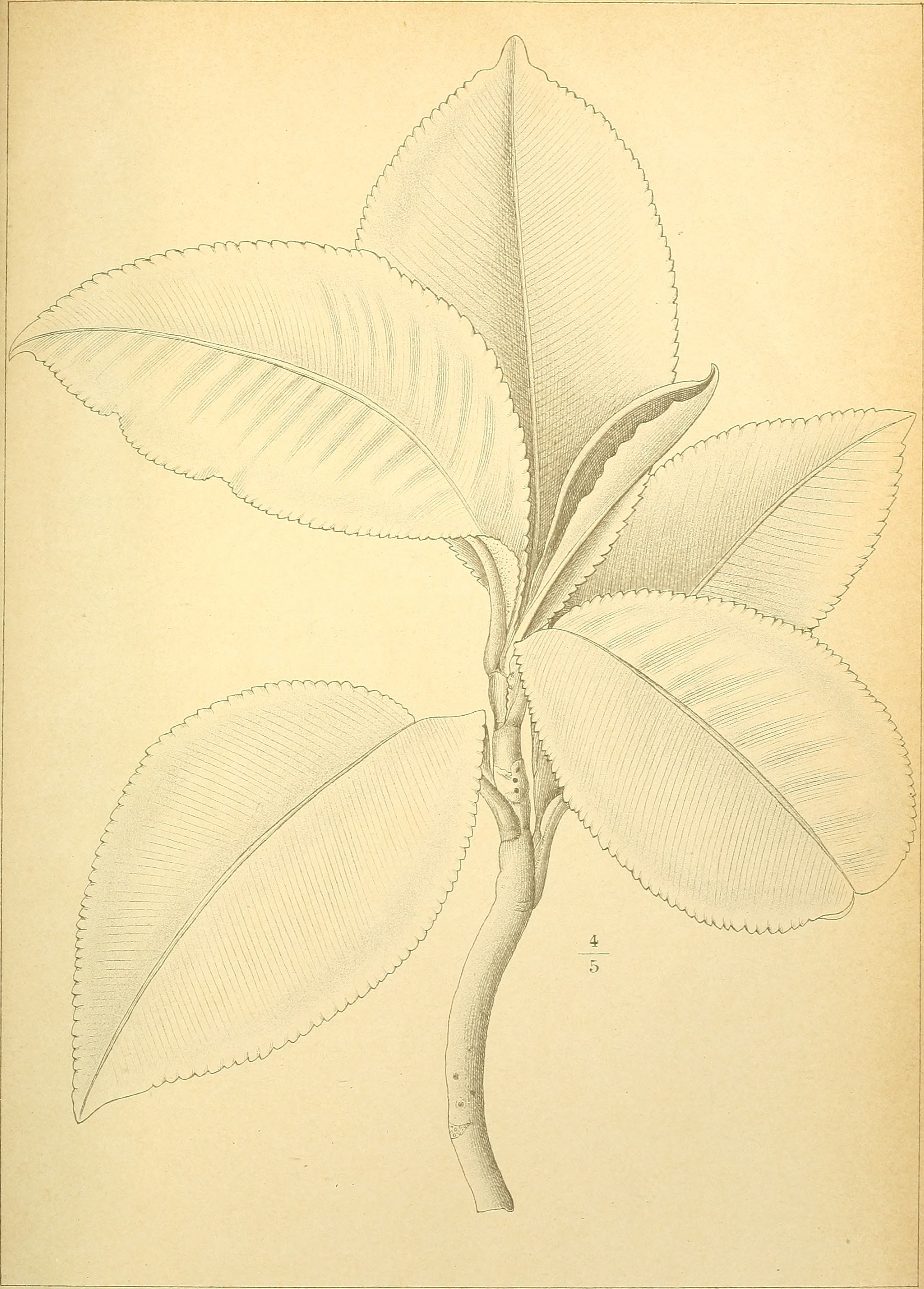
- Labisia serrulata botanical illustration

Scientific classification
- Kingdom: Plantae
- Clade: Embryophytes
- Clade: Tracheophytes
- Clade: Spermatophytes
- Clade: Angiosperms
- Clade: Eudicots
- Clade: Asterids
- Order: Ericales
- Family: Primulaceae
- Subfamily: Myrsinoideae
- Genus: Labisia; Lindl.

Species
- See text

Synonyms
- Angiopetalum Reinw.

= Labisia =

Genus of Primulaceae plants

Labisia is a genus of flowering plants in the family Primulaceae, native to the Malesia biogeographical region. Its best known species is Labisia pumila, which is cultivated as a medicinal herb in Malaysia and Indonesia for, among other things, improving libido in women, induction of childbirth, and relieving postmenopausal discomfort.

== Species ==
Currently accepted species include:

- Labisia acuta Ridl.
- Labisia alata N.E.Br.
- Labisia longistyla King & Gamble
- Labisia obtusifolia Hallier f.
- Labisia ovalifolia Ridl.
- Labisia posthumusiana Sunarno
- Labisia pumila (Blume) Fern.-Vill.
- Labisia serrulata Hallier f.
- Labisia sessilifolia Hallier f.
- Labisia smaragdina L.Linden & Rodigas
- Labisia steenisiana Sunarno
- Labisia sumatrensis Sunarno
