= Cybianthus =

Scientific classification
- Kingdom: Plantae
- Clade: Tracheophytes
- Clade: Angiosperms
- Clade: Eudicots
- Clade: Asterids
- Order: Ericales
- Family: Primulaceae
- Subfamily: Myrsinoideae
- Genus: Cybianthus; Mart. (1831)

Species
- 156; see text

Synonyms
- Comomyrsine Hook.f. (1876); Conomorpha A.DC. (1834); Conostylus Pohl ex A.DC. (1834); Correlliana D'Arcy (1973); Cybianthopsis (Mez) Lundell (1968); Grammadenia Benth. (1846); Microconomorpha (Mez) Lundell (1977); Peckia Vell. (1829); Weigeltia A.DC. (1834)

Genus of flowering plants

Cybianthus is a genus of shrubs and trees in the family Primulaceae. It includes 156 species native to the tropical Americas, ranging from Nicaragua to Bolivia, Paraguay, and southern Brazil.

== Species ==
156 species are accepted.

- Cybianthus agostinianus Pipoly
- Cybianthus alpestris (Warm.) Mez
- Cybianthus amplus (Mez) G.Agostini
- Cybianthus anthuriophyllus Pipoly
- Cybianthus antillanus (Mez) G.Agostini
- Cybianthus apiculatus (Steyerm.) G.Agostini
- Cybianthus bahiensis G.Agostini
- Cybianthus barbosae Pipoly
- Cybianthus barrosoanus G.Agostini
- Cybianthus baruanus (Lundell) Pipoly
- Cybianthus blanchetii (A.DC.) G.Agostini
- Cybianthus bogotensis (Mez) G.Agostini
- Cybianthus boissieri A.DC.
- Cybianthus breweri G.Agostini
- Cybianthus buchtienii (Pax) G.Agostini
- Cybianthus candamoensis Pipoly & Ricketson
- Cybianthus caracasanus (Mez) G.Agostini
- Cybianthus cardonae G.Agostini
- Cybianthus cenepensis Pipoly
- Cybianthus chamaephyta (Diels) G.Agostini
- Cybianthus cogolloi Pipoly
- Cybianthus collinus S.Moore
- Cybianthus colombianus Pipoly
- Cybianthus comperuvianus Pipoly
- Cybianthus condorensis Pipoly & Ricketson
- Cybianthus coriaceus Mart.
- Cybianthus coronatus A.B.Joly & S.L.Jung
- Cybianthus costaricanus Hemsl.
- Cybianthus croatii Pipoly
- Cybianthus crotonoides (R.H.Schomb. ex Mez) G.Agostini
- Cybianthus cruegeri Mez
- Cybianthus cuatrecasasii Pipoly
- Cybianthus cuneifolius Mart.
- Cybianthus cuspidatus Miq.
- Cybianthus cuyabensis Mez
- Cybianthus cyclopetalus Mez
- Cybianthus deltatus Pipoly
- Cybianthus densicoma Mart.
- Cybianthus densiflorus Miq.
- Cybianthus detergens Mart.
- Cybianthus duckei R.E.Schult.
- Cybianthus duidae (Gleason & Moldenke) G.Agostini
- Cybianthus dussii (Mez) G.Agostini
- Cybianthus fabiolae Pipoly
- Cybianthus fendleri Mez
- Cybianthus flavovirens Pipoly
- Cybianthus fosteri Pipoly
- Cybianthus frigidicola (Steyerm.) G.Agostini
- Cybianthus froelichii Mez
- Cybianthus fulvopulverulentus (Mez) G.Agostini
- Cybianthus fuscus Mart.
- Cybianthus gardneri (A.DC.) G.Agostini
- Cybianthus gigantophyllus Pipoly
- Cybianthus glaber A.DC.
- Cybianthus glaziovii Mez
- Cybianthus glomerulatus (A.C.Sm.) G.Agostini
- Cybianthus goudotianus (Mez) G.Agostini
- Cybianthus goyazensis Mez
- Cybianthus gracillimus (Warm.) Mez
- Cybianthus grandezii Pipoly
- Cybianthus grandifolius (Mez) G.Agostini
- Cybianthus granulosus Pipoly
- Cybianthus guyanensis (A.DC.) Miq.
- Cybianthus hoehnei (Mansf.) G.Agostini
- Cybianthus holstii Pipoly
- Cybianthus huampamiensis Pipoly
- Cybianthus huberi Pipoly
- Cybianthus humilis (Mez) G.Agostini
- Cybianthus idroboi Pipoly
- Cybianthus incognitus Pipoly
- Cybianthus indecorus Mez
- Cybianthus itacolomyensis M.Lisboa & Badini
- Cybianthus iteoides (Benth.) G.Agostini
- Cybianthus jajiensis (Steyerm.) G.Agostini
- Cybianthus jaramilloi Pipoly
- Cybianthus jensonii Pipoly
- Cybianthus julianii Pipoly
- Cybianthus kayapii (Lundell) Pipoly
- Cybianthus klotzschii Mez
- Cybianthus laetus (Mez) G.Agostini
- Cybianthus lagoensis Mez
- Cybianthus larensis (Steyerm.) G.Agostini
- Cybianthus laurifolius (Mez) G.Agostini
- Cybianthus lawrencei (Moldenke) G.Agostini
- Cybianthus lepidotus (Gleason) G.Agostini
- Cybianthus leprieurii G.Agostini
- Cybianthus liesneri Pipoly & Ricketson
- Cybianthus lineatus (Benth.) Pipoly
- Cybianthus llanorum Pipoly
- Cybianthus longifolius Miq.
- Cybianthus magnus (Mez) Pipoly
- Cybianthus maguirei G.Agostini ex Pipoly
- Cybianthus marginatus (Benth.) Pipoly
- Cybianthus membranaceus Jung-Mend., Bernacci & M.F.Freitas
- Cybianthus microbotrys A.DC.
- Cybianthus minutiflorus Mez
- Cybianthus montanus (Lundell) G.Agostini
- Cybianthus morii G.Agostini
- Cybianthus multicostatus Miq.
- Cybianthus multiflorus (A.C.Sm.) G.Agostini
- Cybianthus nanayensis (J.F.Macbr.) G.Agostini
- Cybianthus nemophilus Pittier
- Cybianthus nemoralis (Mart.) G.Agostini
- Cybianthus nestorii Pipoly
- Cybianthus nevadensis (Mez) G.Agostini
- Cybianthus oblongifolius (A.DC.) G.Agostini
- Cybianthus obovatus (Mart.) Miq.
- Cybianthus occigranatensis (Cuatrec.) G.Agostini
- Cybianthus parasiticus (Sw.) Pipoly
- Cybianthus parvifolius Schltdl.
- Cybianthus pastensis (Mez) G.Agostini
- Cybianthus penduliflorus Mart.
- Cybianthus perseoides (Mez) G.Agostini
- Cybianthus peruvianus (A.DC.) Miq.
- Cybianthus piresii Pipoly
- Cybianthus pittierianus Pipoly & Ricketson
- Cybianthus plowmanii Pipoly
- Cybianthus poeppigii Mez
- Cybianthus potiaei (Mez) G.Agostini
- Cybianthus prevostiae Pipoly
- Cybianthus prieurii A.DC.
- Cybianthus pseudolongifolius Pipoly
- Cybianthus psychotriifolius (Rusby) Mez
- Cybianthus ptariensis (Steyerm.) Pipoly
- Cybianthus punctatus (Mez) G.Agostini
- Cybianthus quelchii (N.E.Br.) G.Agostini
- Cybianthus regnellii Mez
- Cybianthus resinosus Mez
- Cybianthus reticulatus (Benth. ex Miq.) G.Agostini
- Cybianthus roraimae (Steyerm.) G.Agostini
- Cybianthus rostratus (Hassk.) G.Agostini
- Cybianthus ruforamulus Pipoly
- Cybianthus rupestris Pipoly
- Cybianthus schlimii (Hook.f.) G.Agostini
- Cybianthus schwackeanus Mez
- Cybianthus sellowianus Mez
- Cybianthus simplex (Hook.f.) G.Agostini
- Cybianthus sintenisii (Urb.) G.Agostini
- Cybianthus sipapoensis Pipoly & G.Agostini
- Cybianthus sodiroanus (Mez) G.Agostini
- Cybianthus spathulifolius G.Agostini ex Pipoly
- Cybianthus spicatus (Kunth) G.Agostini
- Cybianthus spichigeri Pipoly
- Cybianthus sprucei (Hook.f.) G.Agostini
- Cybianthus stapfii (Mez) G.Agostini
- Cybianthus steyermarkianus (G.Agostini) G.Agostini
- Cybianthus sulcatus (Steyerm.) G.Agostini
- Cybianthus surinamensis (A.Spreng.) G.Agostini
- Cybianthus tamanus (Steyerm.) G.Agostini
- Cybianthus tayoensis Pipoly & Ricketson
- Cybianthus timanae Pipoly
- Cybianthus vasquezii Pipoly
- Cybianthus venezuelanus Mez
- Cybianthus verticillatus (Vell.) G.Agostini
- Cybianthus verticilloides (Cuatrec.) G.Agostini
- Cybianthus wurdackii G.Agostini ex Pipoly
