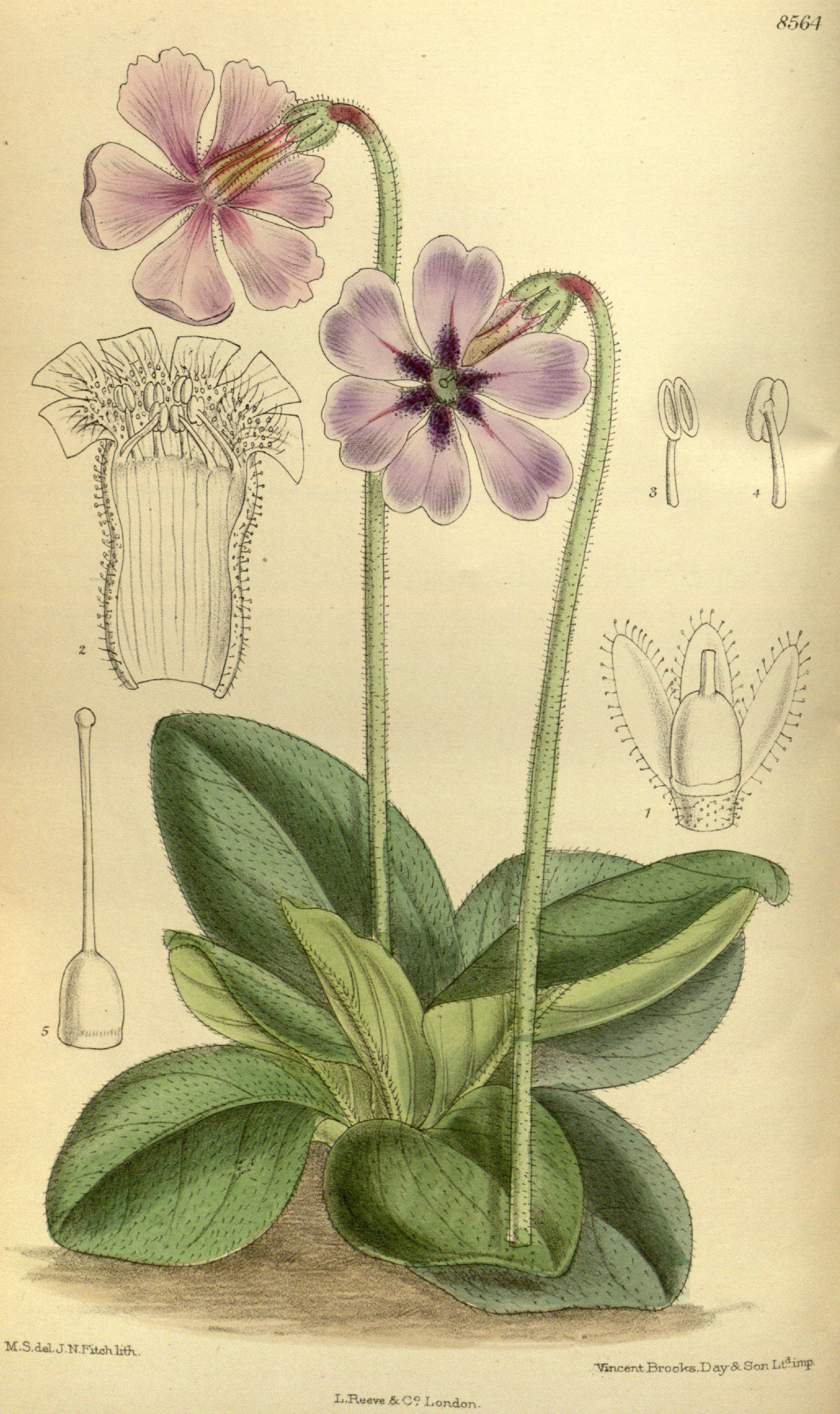
- Primula vinciflora 140-8564

Scientific classification
- Kingdom: Plantae
- Clade: Tracheophytes
- Clade: Angiosperms
- Clade: Eudicots
- Clade: Asterids
- Order: Ericales
- Family: Primulaceae
- Genus: Omphalogramma; Franch.

= Omphalogramma =

Genus of plants

Omphalogramma is a genus of flowering plants belonging to the family Primulaceae.

Its native range is the Himalayas to Central China and Northern Myanmar.

== Species ==
Species:

- Omphalogramma brachysiphon W.W.Sm.
- Omphalogramma burmanicum H.R.Fletcher
- Omphalogramma coxii Balf.f.
- Omphalogramma delavayi (Franch.) Franch.
- Omphalogramma elegans Forrest
- Omphalogramma elwesianum (King ex G.Watt) Franch.
- Omphalogramma forrestii Balf.f.
- Omphalogramma minus Hand.-Mazz.
- Omphalogramma pilosum H.R.Fletcher
- Omphalogramma souliei Franch.
- Omphalogramma tibeticum H.R.Fletcher
- Omphalogramma vinciflorum (Franch.) Franch.
