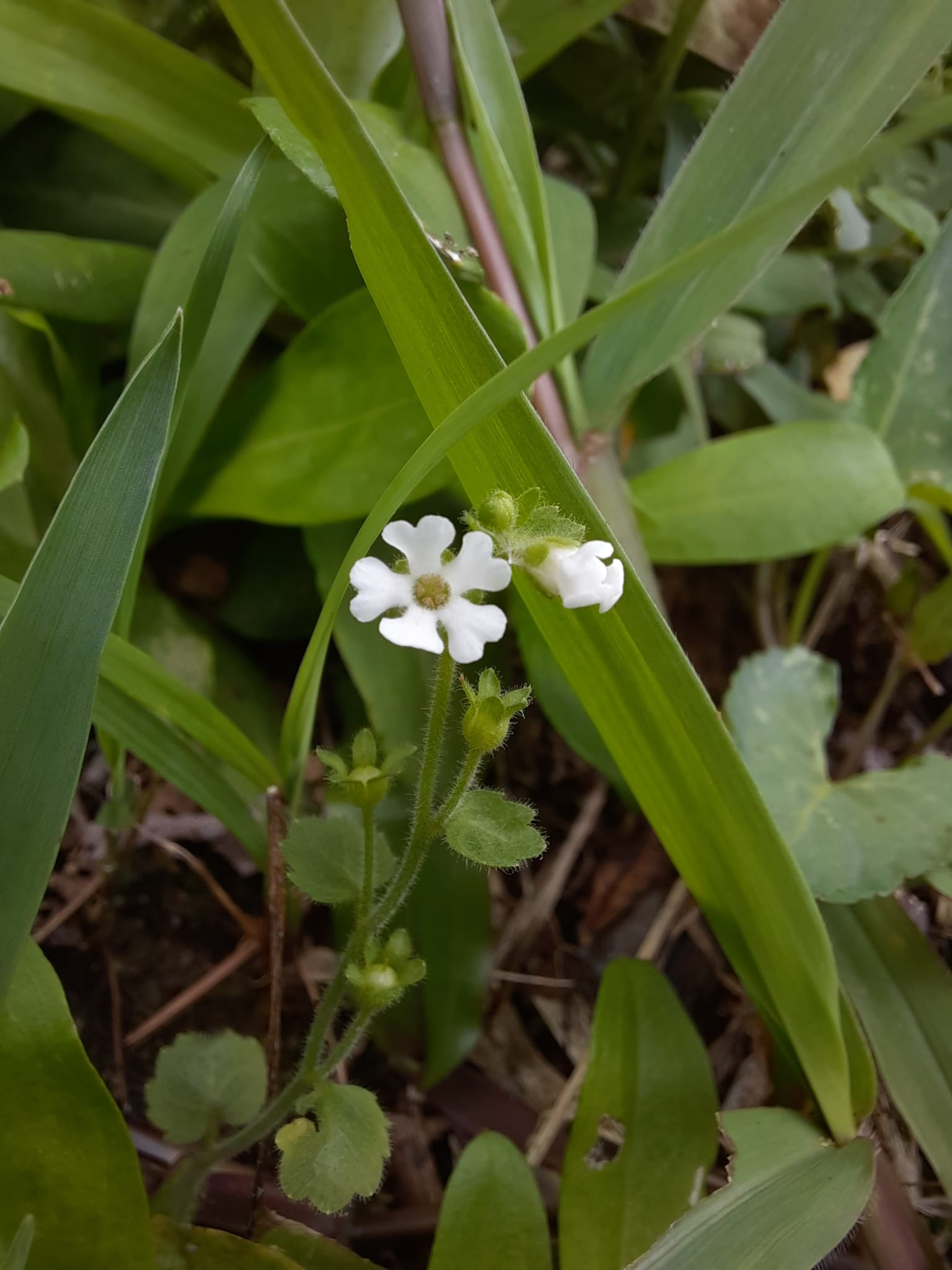
- Stimpsonia chamaedryoides

Scientific classification
- Kingdom: Plantae
- Clade: Tracheophytes
- Clade: Angiosperms
- Clade: Eudicots
- Clade: Asterids
- Order: Ericales
- Family: Primulaceae
- Genus: Stimpsonia; C.Wright ex A.Gray

= Stimpsonia (plant) =

Genus of flowering plants

Stimpsonia is a genus of flowering plants belonging to the family Primulaceae.

Its native range is from south eastern China to Japan (including the Ryukyu Islands), Korea and Taiwan in temperate eastern Asia.

The genus name of Stimpsonia is in honour of William Stimpson (1832–1872), a noted American scientist, who was interested particularly in marine biology. It was first described and published in Mem. Amer. Acad. Arts, n.s., Vol.6 on page 401 in 1859.

== Known species ==
According to Kew:

- Stimpsonia chamaedryoides C.Wright ex A.Gray
- Stimpsonia nanlingensis G.H.Huang & G.Hao
