= Systellantha =

Scientific classification
- Kingdom: Plantae
- Clade: Tracheophytes
- Clade: Angiosperms
- Clade: Eudicots
- Clade: Asterids
- Order: Ericales
- Family: Primulaceae
- Genus: Systellantha; B.C.Stone

Genus of flowering plants

Systellantha is a genus of flowering plants belonging to the family Primulaceae.

Its native range is Borneo.

Species:

- Systellantha brookeae B.C.Stone
- Systellantha fruticosa (B.C.Stone) B.C.Stone
- Systellantha serratifolia Drinkell & Utteridge
