= Stylogyne =

Scientific classification
- Kingdom: Plantae
- Clade: Embryophytes
- Clade: Tracheophytes
- Clade: Angiosperms
- Clade: Eudicots
- Clade: Asterids
- Order: Ericales
- Family: Primulaceae
- Subfamily: Myrsinoideae
- Genus: Stylogyne; A.DC.

Type species
- Stylogyne martiana A.DC.

Family of shrubs and trees

Stylogyne is a genus of shrubs and trees in the family Primulaceae. Its members are found throughout tropical parts of the Americas, with the greatest diversity in South America. It is closely related to the genera Ardisia and Geissanthus, and various species have been transferred between the three genera. All three were formerly placed in the family Myrsinaceae, which is now treated as a subfamily (Myrsinoideae) of the Primulaceae.

== Species ==
The following species of Stylogyne are recognised by The Plant List:

- Stylogyne aguarunana Pipoly & Ricketson
- Stylogyne ardisioides (Kunth) Mez
- Stylogyne atra Mez
- Stylogyne bracteolata (Lundell) Pipoly
- Stylogyne canaliculata (Lodd.) Mez
- Stylogyne darienensis Lundell
- Stylogyne depauperata Mez
- Stylogyne dusenii Ricketson & Pipoly
- Stylogyne glomeruliflora Cuatrec.
- Stylogyne hayesii Mez
- Stylogyne incognita Pipoly
- Stylogyne indecora Mez
- Stylogyne lasseri (Lundell) Pipoly
- Stylogyne lateriflora (Sw.) Mez
- Stylogyne laxiflora Mez
- Stylogyne leptantha (Miq.) Mez
- Stylogyne lhotzkyana (A.DC.) Mez
- Stylogyne longifolia (Mart. ex Miq.) Mez
- Stylogyne martiana A.DC.
- Stylogyne mathewsii Mez
- Stylogyne membranacea Pipoly
- Stylogyne micrantha (Kunth) Mez
- Stylogyne minutiflora Cuatrec.
- Stylogyne nigricans (A.DC.) Mez
- Stylogyne orinocensis (Kunth) Mez
- Stylogyne pauciflora Mez
- Stylogyne pucuroensis Ricketson & Pipoly
- Stylogyne racemiflora Ricketson & Pipoly
- Stylogyne rodriguesiana Pipoly
- Stylogyne serpentina Mez
- Stylogyne sordida Mez
- Stylogyne spruceana Mez
- Stylogyne turbacensis (Kunth) Mez
- Stylogyne viridis (Lundell) Ricketson & Pipoly
- Stylogyne warmingii Mez
