= Solonia =

Scientific classification
- Kingdom: Plantae
- Clade: Embryophytes
- Clade: Tracheophytes
- Clade: Angiosperms
- Clade: Eudicots
- Clade: Asterids
- Order: Ericales
- Family: Primulaceae
- Genus: Solonia; Urb.
- Species: S. reflexa

Binomial name
- Solonia reflexa Urb.

Synonyms
- Walleniella cubana P.Wilson

Genus of flowering plants

Solonia is a monotypic genus of flowering plants belonging to the family Primulaceae, with just contains one species, Solonia reflexa Urb.

It grows as a shrub and is native to Cuba.

The genus name of Solonia is in honour of Solon (c. 640 BC – c. 560 BC), an Athenian statesman, lawmaker and poet. The Latin specific epithet of reflexa means bent backwards or reflexed from reflecto. Both the genus and the species were first described by Ignatz Urban and published in Repert. Spec. Nov. Regni Veg. Vol.18 on pages 22–23 in 1922.
