= Loheria =

Scientific classification
- Kingdom: Plantae
- Clade: Tracheophytes
- Clade: Angiosperms
- Clade: Eudicots
- Clade: Asterids
- Order: Ericales
- Family: Primulaceae
- Genus: Loheria; Merr.

Synonyms
- Jubilaria Mez

Genus of flowering plants

Loheria is a genus of flowering plants belonging to the family Primulaceae.

It is native to New Guinea and the Philippines.

The genus name of Loheria is in honour of August Loher (1874–1930), German pharmacist and botanist. It was first described and published in Philipp. J. Sci., C Vol.5 on page 373 in 1910.

== Known species ==
According to Kew:

- Loheria bracteata Merr.
- Loheria crassifolia (Merr.) B.C.Stone
- Loheria jubilaria B.C.Stone
- Loheria papuana Mez ex Sleumer
- Loheria porteana Merr.
- Loheria reiniana (M.Jacobs) Sleumer
