= Amblyanthopsis =

Scientific classification
- Kingdom: Plantae
- Clade: Embryophytes
- Clade: Tracheophytes
- Clade: Spermatophytes
- Clade: Angiosperms
- Clade: Eudicots
- Clade: Asterids
- Order: Ericales
- Family: Primulaceae
- Subfamily: Myrsinoideae
- Genus: Amblyanthopsis; Mez

Genus of flowering plants

Amblyanthopsis is a genus of flowering plants belonging to the family Primulaceae.

Its native range is Himalaya to Assam, Philippines.

Species:

- Amblyanthopsis bhotanica (C.B.Clarke) Mez
- Amblyanthopsis burmanica Y.H.Tan & H.B.Ding
- Amblyanthopsis membranacea (Wall. ex A.DC.) Mez
- Amblyanthopsis philippinensis Mez
