= Fittingia =

Scientific classification
- Kingdom: Plantae
- Clade: Embryophytes
- Clade: Tracheophytes
- Clade: Angiosperms
- Clade: Eudicots
- Clade: Asterids
- Order: Ericales
- Family: Primulaceae
- Genus: Fittingia; Mez

Species
- See text

Synonyms
- Abromeitia Mez

Genus of flowering plants

Fittingia is a genus of flowering plants in the primrose family Primulaceae. All the species are native to New Guinea. They are shrubs or small trees typically found in the understory.

== Species ==
Currently accepted species include:

- Fittingia carnosifolia Sleumer
- Fittingia conferta (S.Moore) Sleumer
- Fittingia grandiflora C.M.Hu
- Fittingia headsiana Takeuchi
- Fittingia mariae B.C.Stone
- Fittingia paniculata Takeuchi
- Fittingia tuberculata Sleumer
- Fittingia tubiflora Mez
- Fittingia urceolata Mez
