= Vegaea =

Scientific classification
- Kingdom: Plantae
- Clade: Tracheophytes
- Clade: Angiosperms
- Clade: Eudicots
- Clade: Asterids
- Order: Ericales
- Family: Primulaceae
- Genus: Vegaea; Urb. (1913)
- Species: V. pungens

Binomial name
- Vegaea pungens Urb. (1913)

Genus of flowering plants

Vegaea is a genus of flowering plants belonging to the family Primulaceae. It contains a single species, Vegaea pungens, a shrub endemic to the Dominican Republic.
