= Emblemantha =

Scientific classification
- Kingdom: Plantae
- Clade: Tracheophytes
- Clade: Angiosperms
- Clade: Eudicots
- Clade: Asterids
- Order: Ericales
- Family: Primulaceae
- Genus: Emblemantha; B.C.Stone

Genus of plants

Emblemantha is a genus of flowering plants belonging to the family Primulaceae.

Its native range is Sumatera.

Species:

- Emblemantha urnulata B.C.Stone
