= Conandrium =

Scientific classification
- Kingdom: Plantae
- Clade: Tracheophytes
- Clade: Angiosperms
- Clade: Eudicots
- Clade: Asterids
- Order: Ericales
- Family: Primulaceae
- Genus: Conandrium (K.Schum.) Mez

Genus of flowering plants

Conandrium is a genus of flowering plants belonging to the family Primulaceae.

Its native range is Malesia.

Species:

- Conandrium polyanthum (Lauterb. & K.Schum.) Mez
- Conandrium rhynchocarpum (Scheff.) Mez
