= Ctenardisia =

Scientific classification
- Kingdom: Plantae
- Clade: Tracheophytes
- Clade: Angiosperms
- Clade: Eudicots
- Clade: Asterids
- Order: Ericales
- Family: Primulaceae
- Genus: Ctenardisia; Ducke

Genus of flowering plants

Ctenardisia is a genus of flowering plants belonging to the family Primulaceae.

Its native range is Mexico to Brazil.

Species:

- Ctenardisia amplifolia (Standl.) Lundell
- Ctenardisia ovandensis (Lundell) Lundell
- Ctenardisia purpusii (Brandegee) Lundell
- Ctenardisia speciosa Ducke
- Ctenardisia stenobotrys (Standl.) Lundell & Pipoly
