= Hymenandra =

Scientific classification
- Kingdom: Plantae
- Clade: Tracheophytes
- Clade: Angiosperms
- Clade: Eudicots
- Clade: Asterids
- Order: Ericales
- Family: Primulaceae
- Genus: Hymenandra; A.DC. ex Spach

Genus of plants

Hymenandra is a genus of flowering plants belonging to the family Primulaceae.

Its native range is Assam to Southern Central China and Western Malesia, Central America to Colombia.

Species:

- Hymenandra acutissima (Cuatrec.) Pipoly & Ricketson
- Hymenandra beamanii B.C.Stone
- Hymenandra calcicola (Furtado) B.C.Stone
- Hymenandra callejasii (Pipoly) Pipoly & Ricketson
- Hymenandra calycosa (Hemsl.) Pipoly & Ricketson
- Hymenandra crosbyi (Lundell) Pipoly & Ricketson
- Hymenandra diamphidia B.C.Stone
- Hymenandra iteophylla (Ridl.) Furtado
- Hymenandra lilacina B.C.Stone
- Hymenandra narayanaswamii M.P.Nayar & G.S.Giri
- Hymenandra pittieri (Mez) Pipoly & Ricketson
- Hymenandra rosea B.C.Stone
- Hymenandra sordida (Lundell) Pipoly & Ricketson
- Hymenandra squamata (Lundell) Pipoly & Ricketson
- Hymenandra stenophylla (Donn.Sm.) Pipoly & Ricketson
- Hymenandra wallichii A.DC.
