= Sadiria =

Scientific classification
- Kingdom: Plantae
- Clade: Embryophytes
- Clade: Tracheophytes
- Clade: Spermatophytes
- Clade: Angiosperms
- Clade: Eudicots
- Clade: Asterids
- Order: Ericales
- Family: Primulaceae
- Genus: Sadiria; Mez

Genus of plants

Sadiria is a genus of flowering plants belonging to the family Primulaceae. Its native range is Eastern Himalaya to Southern Central China and Northern Myanmar.

== Species ==
The genus includes the following accepted species:

- Sadiria aberrans (E.Walker) C.M.Hu & Y.F.Deng
- Sadiria boweri Dunn
- Sadiria erecta (C.B.Clarke) Mez
- Sadiria eugeniifolia (Wall. ex A.DC.) Mez
- Sadiria griffithii (C.B.Clarke) Mez
- Sadiria longistyla Ze H.Wang & H.Peng
- Sadiria solanifolia Mez
- Sadiria subsessilifolia M.P.Nayar & G.S.Giri
- Sadiria yingjiangensis Ze H.Wang & H.Peng
