= Monoporus (plant) =

Scientific classification
- Kingdom: Plantae
- Clade: Tracheophytes
- Clade: Angiosperms
- Clade: Eudicots
- Clade: Asterids
- Order: Ericales
- Family: Primulaceae
- Genus: Monoporus; A.DC.

Genus of plants

Monoporus is a genus of flowering plants belonging to the family Primulaceae.

Its native range is Madagascar.

== Species ==
Species:

- Monoporus bipinnatus (Baker) Mez
- Monoporus clusiifolius H.Perrier
- Monoporus floribundus (Roem. & Schult.) Mez
- Monoporus myrianthus (Baker) Mez
- Monoporus paludosus A.DC.
- Monoporus spathulatus Mez
