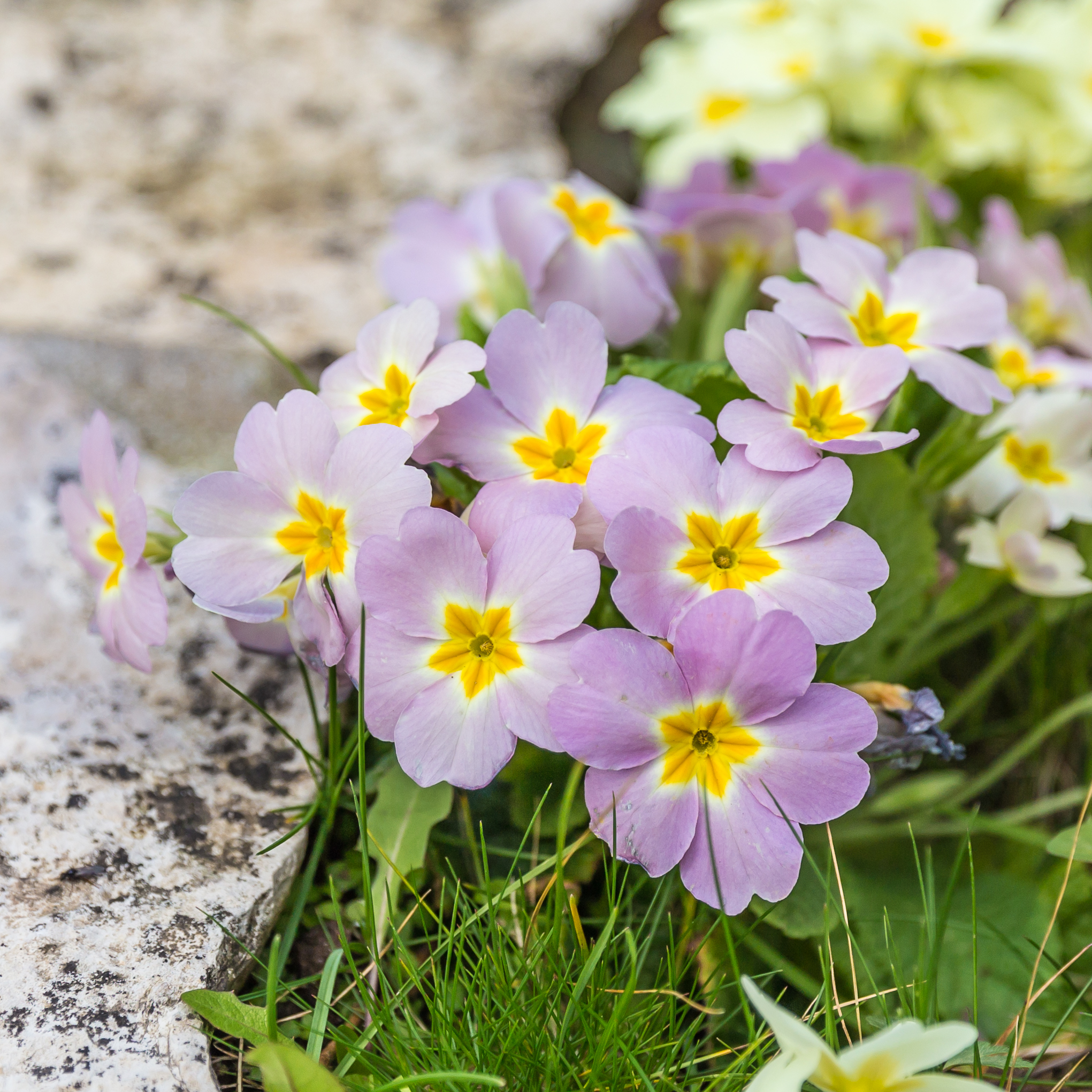
- Primula vulgaris 'rubra'

Scientific classification
- Kingdom: Plantae
- Clade: Embryophytes
- Clade: Tracheophytes
- Clade: Spermatophytes
- Clade: Angiosperms
- Clade: Eudicots
- Clade: Asterids
- Order: Ericales
- Family: Primulaceae; Batsch ex Borkh., nom. cons.

Type genus
- Primula L.

Synonyms
- Myrsinaceae R. Br. Prodr. Fl. Nov. Holland. 532. 1810 [27 Mar 1810] (as "Myrsineae") (1810); Theophrastaceae

= Primulaceae =

Family of flowering plants that includes the primroses

The Primulaceae (/ˌprɪmjəˈleɪʃi.iː/ PRIM-yə-LAY-shee-ee), commonly known as the primrose family (but not related to the evening primrose family), are a family of herbaceous and woody flowering plants including some favourite garden plants and wildflowers. Most are perennial though some species, such as scarlet pimpernel, are annuals.

Previously one of three families in the order Primulales, it underwent considerable generic re-alignment once molecular phylogenetic methods were used for taxonomic classification. The order was then submerged in a much enlarged order Ericales and became a greatly enlarged Primulaceae sensu lato (s.l). In this new classification of the Angiosperm Phylogeny Group, each of the Primulales families was reduced to the rank of subfamily of Primulaceae s.l. The original Primulaceae (Primulaceae sensu stricto or s.s.) then became subfamily Primuloideae, and one genus (Maesa) was raised to the rank of a separate subfamily, making four in all.

== Description ==
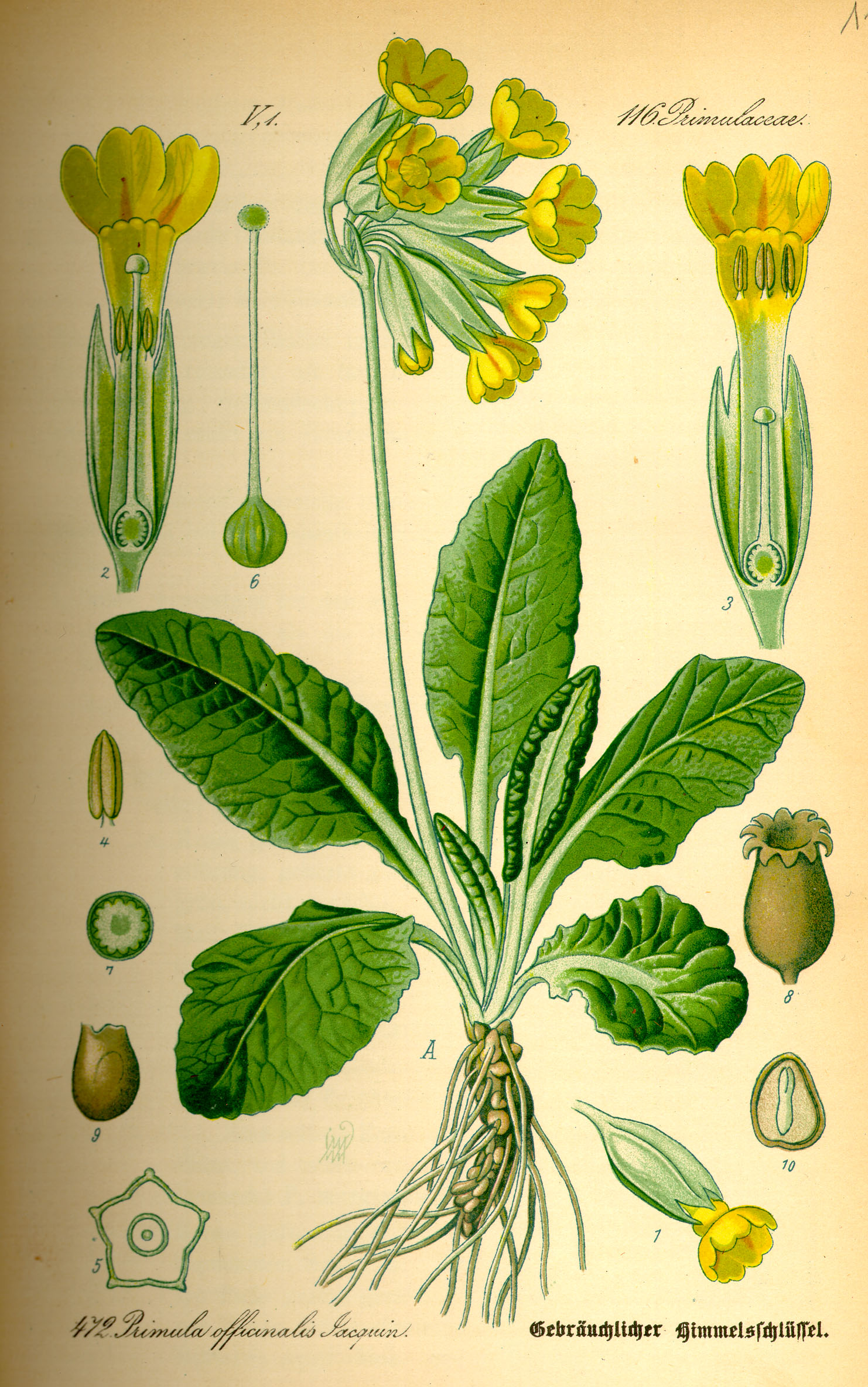
Botanical drawing of Primula officinalis Jacquin. Legend: (A) the whole plant; (2) and (3) vertical cross-sections of the flower; (4) stamen; (5) horizontal cross-section of flower showing the calyx around the flower crown and stigma; (6) the stigma; (7) cross section through the ovary; (8) calyx; (9) seed; (10) cross section of seed

The family shares a number of characteristics, including haplostemonous flowers having the same number of petals and stamens, sympetalous corolla having the petals united, stamens opposite the petals, free central placentation, bitegmic (two layered) ovules and nuclear endosperm formation.

=== Stems ===
Primulaceae are mostly herbaceous, having no woody stem, except that some form cushions (spreading mats a few inches high) and their stems are stiffened by lignin. The stems can grow upright (erect) or spread out horizontally and then turn upright (decumbent).

=== Leaves ===
Leaves are simple, being directly attached to the stem by a petiole (stalk), but unlike the leaves of most flowering plants they have no stipules. The petiole is short or the leaf tapers gradually towards the base. Leaf arrangement is typically alternate but some are opposite or whorled, and there is generally a rosette at the base of the stem. The edges are toothed (dentate) or sawtoothed. New leaves in the bud are usually involute (rolled towards the upper surface) or conduplicate (folded upwards), but a few species roll downwards.

=== Flowers ===
Each flower is bisexual, having both stamens and carpels. They have radial symmetry; the petals can be separate or partially or fully fused together to form a tube-shaped corolla that opens up at the mouth to form a bell-like shape (as in item 8 in the figure) or a flat-faced flower. In most of the families of Ericales, stamens alternate with lobes, but in Primulaceae there is a stamen opposite each petal.

The calyx has 4 to 9 lobes and persists after flowering. They are grouped in unbranched, indeterminate clusters such as racemes, spikes, corymbs or umbels.

=== Reproductive anatomy ===
The fruit of Primulaceae begins as an ovary and inside it are the future seeds (ovules). These are attached to a central axis without any partitions between them (an arrangement called free central placentation; see item 7 in the figure), and they are bitegmic (having a double protective layer around each ovule). Unlike in most other families of Ericales, both layers form the opening at the top (the micropyle).

=== Seeds and fruit ===
As seeds develop, an endosperm grows around the embryo through free division of nuclei without forming walls (nuclear endosperm formation). The embryo forms a pair of short, narrow cotyledons (item 10 in the figure). Usually multiple seeds are in a capsule that is carried on a straight stalk (pedicel or scape). After it matures, it splits apart, releasing the seeds ballistically.

== Taxonomy ==
=== History ===
The taxonomic history of Primulaceae has been long and complex. The botanical authority for the family name is given to August Batsch (1794), as Batsch ex Borkh, using the term Primulae with six genera, the valid description being subsequently given by Borkhausen (1797). (Note: "More additions affecting conserved familial names are from Batsch (1794), which is to be considered as the place for valid publication of Melanthiaceae and Primulaceae, both accepted and conserved with the authorship of 'Batsch ex Borkh. 1797' but validly published in 1794 by a reference in the introduction of that book to the corresponding descriptions in Batsch (1786)") Some earlier authors attributed the name to Ventenat (1799), as Primulaceae Vent., who described the Primulacées, but Batsch had precedence.

Linnaeus (1753) placed Primula and related primuloid genera in the Hexandria Monogynia (six stamens one pistil) in his sexual classification based on reproductive characteristics. Jussieu arranged Linnaeus' genera in a hierarchical system of ranks based on the relative value of a much wider range of characteristics. In his Genera plantarum (1789) he organised the primuloid genera into two Ordo (families), within a class (VIII) he called Dicotyledones Monopetalae Corolla Hypogyna, based on the cotyledons (two), form of the petals (fused), and position of the corolla with respect to the ovary (below). Jussieu's families were the Lysimachiae, including Primula and Theophrasta and the Sapotae, including Myrsine, these being the three main lineages in modern understanding.

The most complete treatment of the Primulaceae family, with nearly 1,000 species arranged into 22 genera, was by Pax and Knuth in 1905 in the Engler system. They divided the family into five tribes (and several subtribes); Androsaceae, Cyclamineae, Lysimachieae, Samoleae and Corideae. Many systems since have lacked consistency, but generally recognised two major groups as either tribes or subfamilies, the Lysimachieae and Primuleae (the Androsaceae of Pax and Knuth), with the largest genera being Primula, Lysimachia and Androsace. In the Cronquist system (1988), Cronquist included the three closely related families, Primulaceae, Myrsinaceae and Theophrastaceae in the order Primulales, of subclass Dilleniidae, based on morphological characteristics, in particular, ovaries with free-central placentation, a feature considered synapomorphic. His circumscription of Primulaceae included about 800 species.

==== Molecular phylogenetics ====
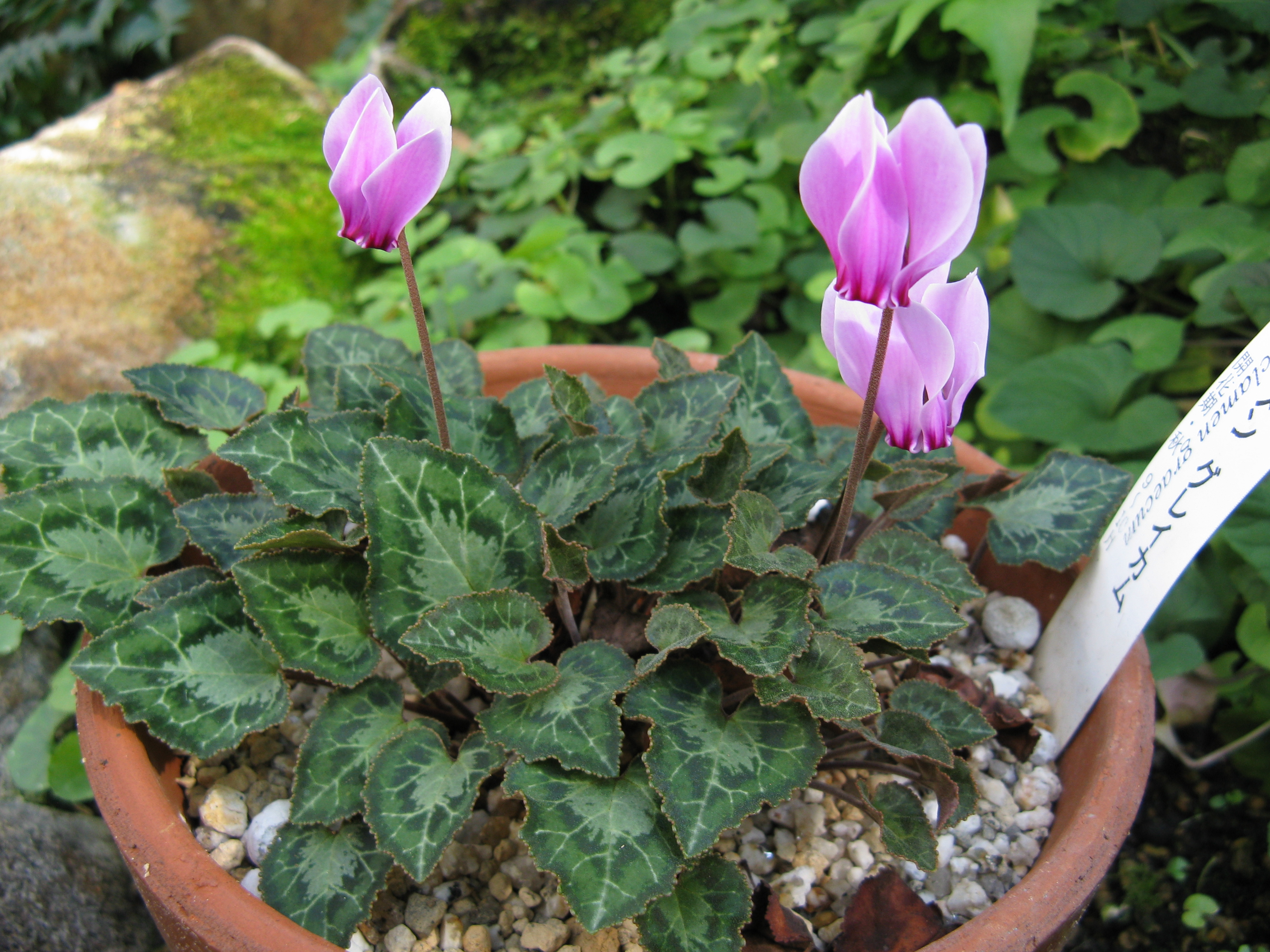
Cyclamen graecum

These three families were referred to as the primuloid families. With the later development of molecular phylogenetic methods, the Primulales were found to be more closely related to other families within the Ericales, and the three primuloid families were subsequently absorbed into an expanded Ericales (Ericales sensu lato or s.l.), making 24 families within that order, where the primuloids formed a monophyletic clade. It was also apparent that Myrsinaceae were paraphyletic, unless the genus Maesa was segregated and elevated to become a new monogeneric family, Maesaceae, but also that Primulaceae were probably paraphyletic.

In the first consensus taxonomic classification, the Angiosperm Phylogeny Group (APG 1998), these proposals were recognised by including Primulaceae within Ericales, as Eudicots, forming one of three clades in the Asterids (Asteridae). Maesa was formally segregated in 2000. Further changes came from analysis of DNA sequence data. This led to the move of genera (primarily terrestrial non-basal-rosette) from Primulaceae to Mysinaceae and Theophrastaceae. At that time Primulaceae was considered to consist of nine tribes (Primuleae, Androsaceae, Ardisiandreae, Lysimachieae, Glauceae, Anagallideae, Corideae, Cyclamineae, and Samoleae). Notably, Lysimachieae and three smaller tribes, Corideae, Cyclamineae and Ardisiandreae, were transferred to Myrsinaceae, and Samoleae to Theophrastaceae. This enlarged Myrsinaceae is distinguished as Myrsinaceae s.l. in comparison to the previous smaller family, Myrsinaceae s.s. (less Maesa). Some authors preferred to raise Samoleae to its own family, Samolaceae, but this has not been accepted by subsequent authors, placing it within Theophrastaceae, while recognising its distinct position within that grouping. These transfers, to preserve monophyly at the family level essentially left two tribes remaining in Primulaceae, the Primuleae and Androsaceae, with about 15 genera sharing a number of common characteristics. These additional changes were reflected in the 2003 revision of the APG system (APG II), where the now four primuloid families were among 23 in Ericales. This restricted Primulaceae sensu stricto (s.s.) consisted of three groups: The Primulae, including Primula, the largest genus; the Androsaceae, including Androsace, the second largest genus; together with a small third group containing Soldanella, Hottonia, Omphalogramma and Bryocarpum.

The APG third classification system (APG III, 2009) discussed all the taxonomic challenges arising from the phylogenetic studies, and placed all primuloid genera into one large Primulaceae s.l., corresponding to Cronquist's Primulales. They stated that "The biggest problem for APG III was the question of how to treat Primulaceae and their immediate relatives, a closely related group that in the past has often been recognized as a separate order". The decision to treat all genera as a single family was based on the observation that the new circumscriptions had little in the way of apomorphies, but the entire group had numerous synapomorphies and were easy to recognise. This resulted in an Ericales with 22 families. Consequently, the four primuloid families were reduced to the rank of subfamilies within Primulaceae s.l.

=== Phylogeny ===
Primulaceae s.l. sensu APG III form part of the speciose (species rich) Asterid order Ericales s.l., with about 12,000 species and 22 (Note: Ericales has 21 or 22 families, depending on whether Sladeniaceae is recognised as separate from, or submerged in Pentaphylacaceae) families as per APG IV. Ericales is one of four major clades within the asterids, where it is sister to the euasterids. The phylogenetic structure of Ericales, as shown in the following cladogram, consists of seven major suprafamilial clades (e.g. balsaminoids, styracoids) and a group of "core" Ericales. Within the eracalean families, Primulaceae s.l. is shown as a sister group to Ebenaceae, and both are sister to Sapotaceae. These three families make up the primuloid clade.

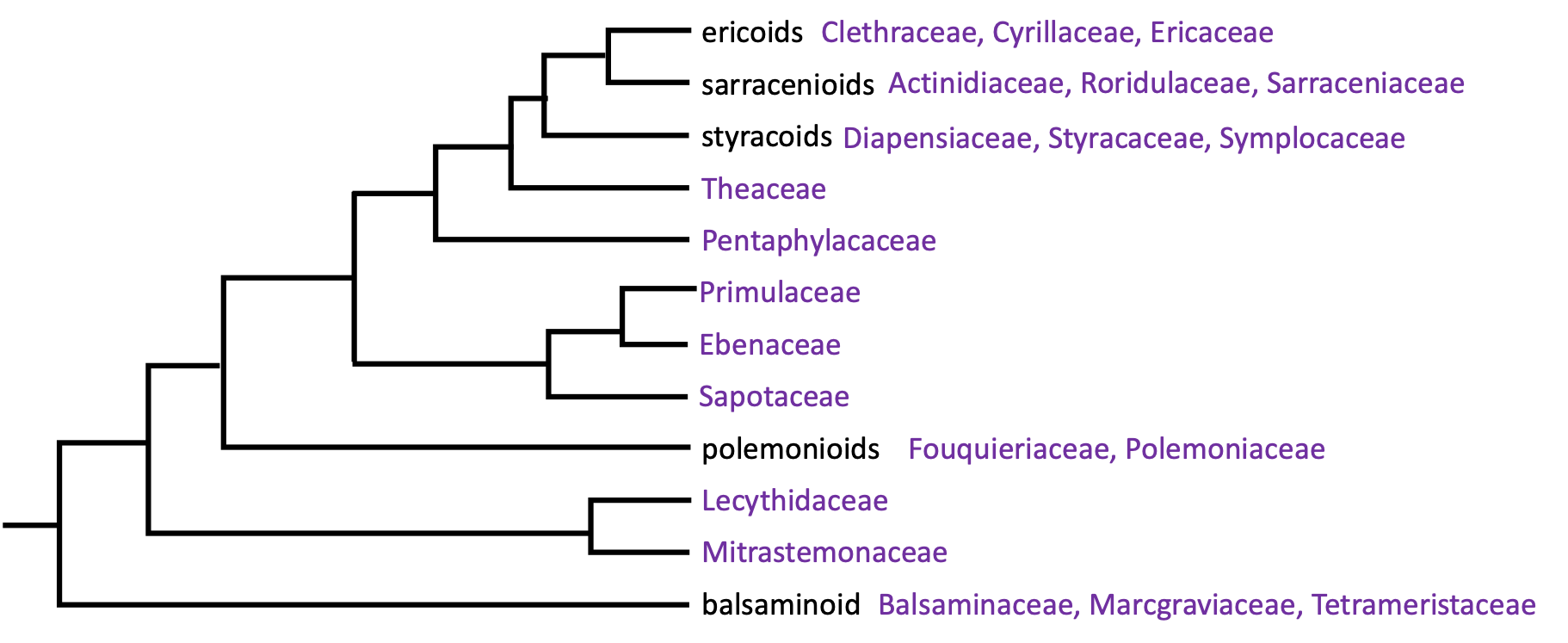

==== Evolution and biogeography ====
The fossil record of Primulaceae s.l. is sparse, but the crown group has been estimated as c. 46-61 million years old. The crown primuloids have been dated to c. 102 mya, with Primulaceae/Ebenaceae divergence at 80 mya. Crown ages for the Primulaceae subfamilies vary from 24 mya for the Maesoideae, the basal group, to 70 mya for the Theophrastoideae.

The primuloids probably originated in a shared Neotropical/Indo-Malaysian ancestral range, with the Primulaceae/Ebenaceae clade occupying the neotropics. Theophrastoideae is nearly all neotropical with a more recent migration out of the realm found in the aquatic Samolus genus. The divergence between Theophrastoideae and Primuloideae-Myrsinoideae at 70 mya represents a vicariant event between the Neotropics and the Palearctic in the case of the latter. The Primuloideae originating in the Palearctic, persisted till the last 16 mya, when it started to shift into the Nearctic.

=== Subdivision ===
The three former families of the Primulales, together with the segregated Maesaceae, have been re-circumscribed into the broadly defined Primulaceae sensu lato (s.l.) The two uniting features of this family are a free central placenta and one stamen opposite each of the corolla lobes. The cladogram below shows the infrafamilial phylogenetic relationships, together with the subfamilial crown ages. Maesoideae forms the basal group, while Primuloideae and Myrsinoideae are in a sister group relationship.

- Primulaceae s.l.
  - 24.1mya
    Maesoideae
  - - 70mya
      Theophrastoideae
    - - 46.4mya
        Primuloideae
      - 53.2mya
        Myrsinoideae

Christenhusz et al. (2016, 2017) list 53 genera and 2,790 species, varying from 1 in Maesoideae to 38 in Myrsinoideae, with 8 in Theophrastoideae and the remaining 6 in Primuloideae. Byng (2014) and Plants of the World Online list 55 accepted genera. The generic limits of Myrsinoideae are not fully resolved and the status of a number of genera is under revision.

==== Subfamilies ====
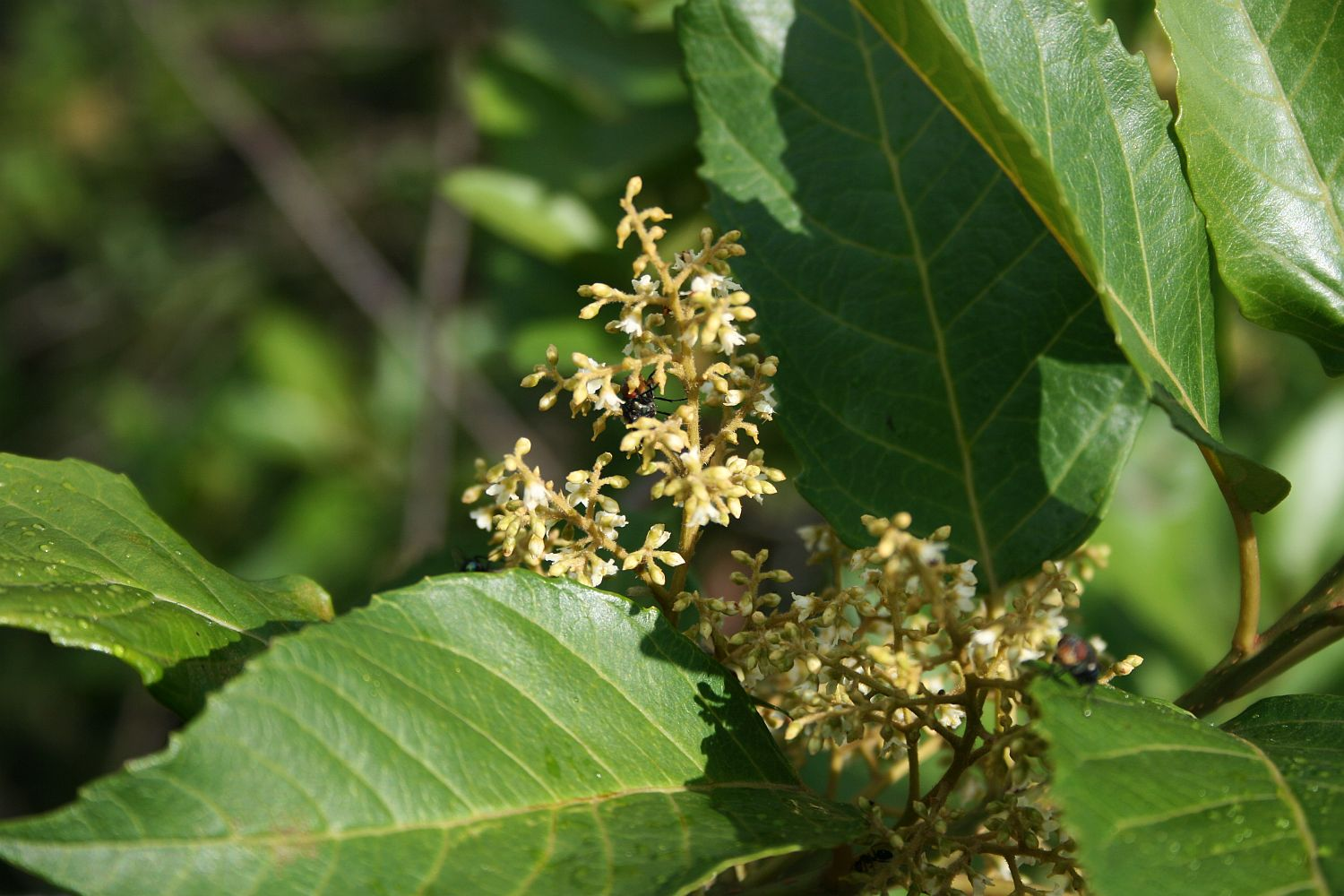
Maesa lanceolata

===== Maesoideae (A. DC.) A. DC. =====
Maesoideae is a monogeneric subfamily, whose single genus is Maesa Forssk. It is a genus of trees. The flowers are small, with short tubules and semi-inferior ovary, arranged in axillary or terminal racemes, or in panicles. Maesa has about 100 species, and is distributed in both tropical and subtropical regions of the Old World, ranging from East Africa to Japan.

Once included in the Primulaceae tribe Samoleae, it has most commonly been considered as part of family Myrsinaceae, till segregated into its own family and then submerged as a Primulaceae s.l. subfamily. It has characteristics that distinguish it from Myrsinaceae and forms the basal group of the clade as sister to all other subfamilies.

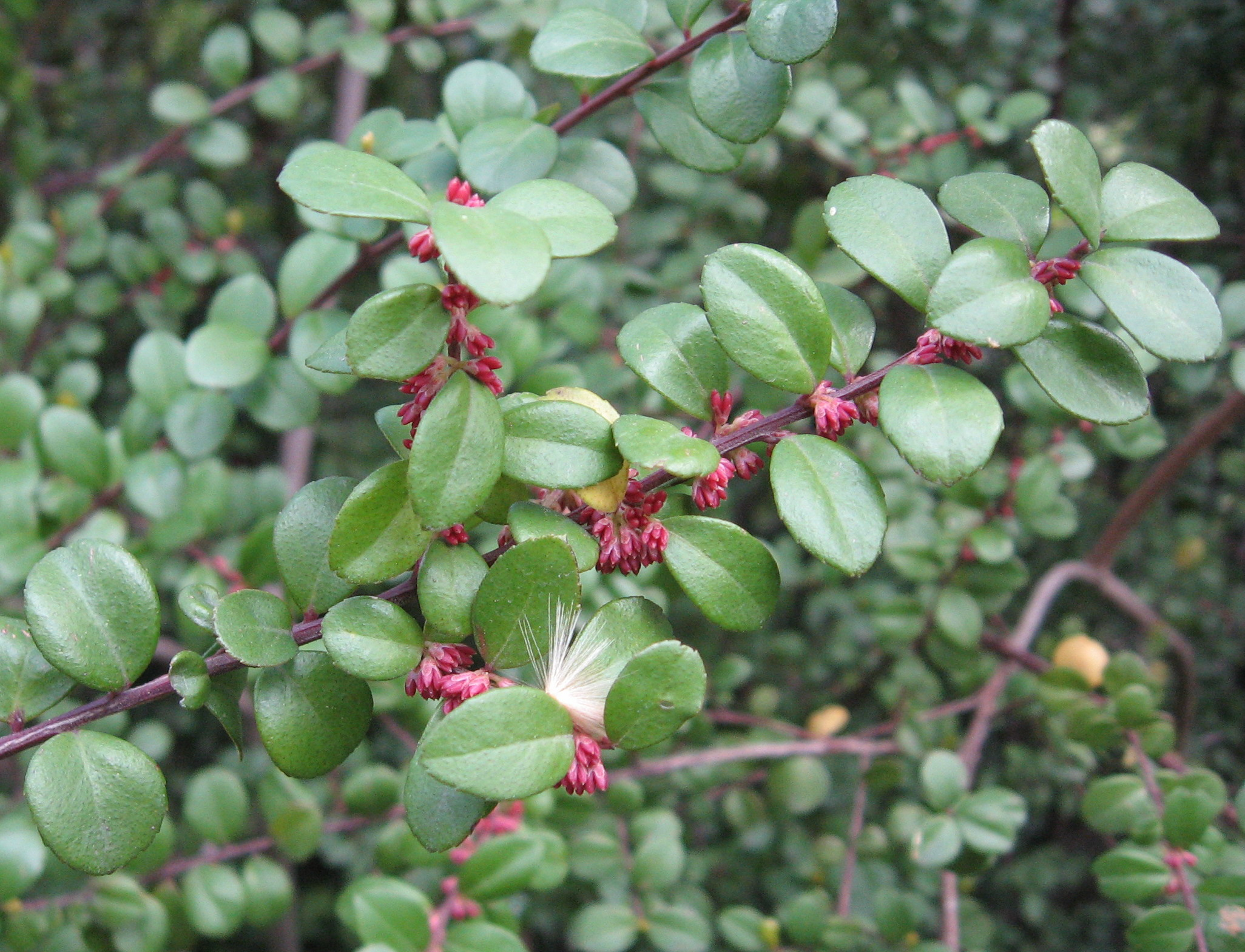
Myrsine africana

===== Myrsinoideae Burnett =====
The relatively large Myrsinoideae, has been treated as a number of tribes, e.g. Ardisieae and Myrsineae, and more recently Lysimachiaeae, a transfer from Primulaceae s.s. Ardisieae and Myrsineae represent the woody clades within the subfamily. Within the Myrsinoideae, the genera represented by the restricted Myrsinaceae s.s., prior to the transfers from the then Primulaceae, form a distinct clade. Genera in Lysimachiaeae are Trientalis, Anagallis, Glaux, Lysimachia, Asterolinon and Pelletiera. Coris had its own tribe within Primulaceae s.s., Corideae, but its molecular affinities led to its transfer to Myrsinoideae. Similarly, Ardisiandra was the tribe Ardisiandreae and Cyclamen the tribe Cyclamineae.

- Aegiceras Gaertn.
- Amblyanthopsis Mez
- Amblyanthus A.DC.
- Antistrophe A.DC.
- Ardisia Sw.
- Ardisiandra Hook. f.
- Badula Juss.
- Conandrium (K.Schumann) Mez
- Coris L.
- Ctenardisia
- Cybianthus Mart.
- Cyclamen L.
- Discocalyx Mez
- Elingamita G.T.S. Baylis
- Embelia Burm.f.
- Emblemantha B.C.Stone
- Fittingia Mez (synonym Abromeitia)
- Geissanthus Bentham & Hooker
- Gentlea – Glaux – Graphardisia – Grenacheria
- Heberdenia Banks ex A.DC.
- Hymenandra A.DC.
- Labisia Lindley
- Loheria Merrill
- Lysimachia Tourn. ex L.
- Mangenotiella M.Schmid
- Monoporus A.DC.
- Myrsine L.
- Oncostemum A. de Jussieu
- Paralysimachia F.Du, J.Wang & S.Y.Yang
- Parathesis J.D.Hooker f.
- Pleiomeris A.DC.
- Sadiria Mez
- Solonia Urban (synonym Walleniella)
- Stimpsonia C.Wright ex A.Gray
- Stylogyne A.DC.
- Systellantha B.C.Stone
- Tapeinosperma Hook.f.
- Vegaea Urban
- Wallenia Sw.

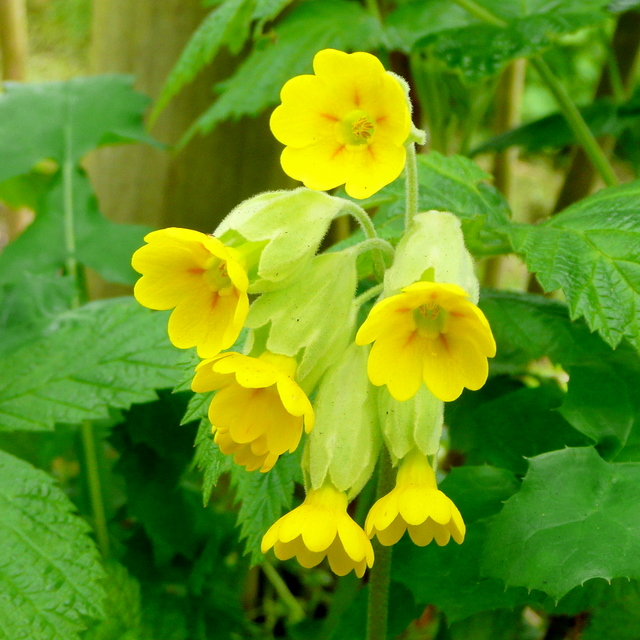
Primula veris

===== Primuloideae Burnett =====
The subfamily is characterised by scapose inflorescences, distinctly tubular flowers having campanulate or hypocrateriform corolla, imbricate corolla aestivation, isodiametric corolla epidermal cells, leaves almost always forming a basal rosette, and ovules rarely immersed in the placenta. In addition they often have syncolpate or sometimes polycolpate pollen, without margo.

Subdivision has included the tribes Androsaceae and Primulae. Takhtajan (1997) gives the four genera of Androsaceae as Androsace (including Douglasia), Vitaliana, Stimpsonia and Pomatosace, and the ten genera of Primulae as Omphalogramma, Bryocarpum, Primula, Dionysia, Cortusa, Kauffmannia, Hottonia, Srediskya, Dodecatheon and Soldanella.

In contrast Kallersjo et al. (2000) place all genera in Primulae, and list thirteen in all: Androsace, Douglasia, Omphalogramma, Soldanella, Dodecatheon, Cortusa, Primula, Dionysia, Vitaliana, Hottonia, Bryocarpum, and Pomatosace. These two (or one) tribes represent the remaining genera in Primuloideae (Primulaceae s.s.) following redistribution among the Primulales on molecular grounds. The 600 species mainly belong to Androsace and Primula and belong to the mountainous regions of Europe and Asia (mainly China).

- Androsace L. (synonym: Douglasia, Vitaliana)
- Bryocarpum Hook. f. & Thomson
- Dionysia Fenzl
- Evotrochis Raf.
- Hottonia Boehr. ex L.
- Kaufmannia Regel
- Omphalogramma Franch.
- Pomatosace Maxim.
- Primula L. (synonym: Dodecatheon)
- Soldanella L.

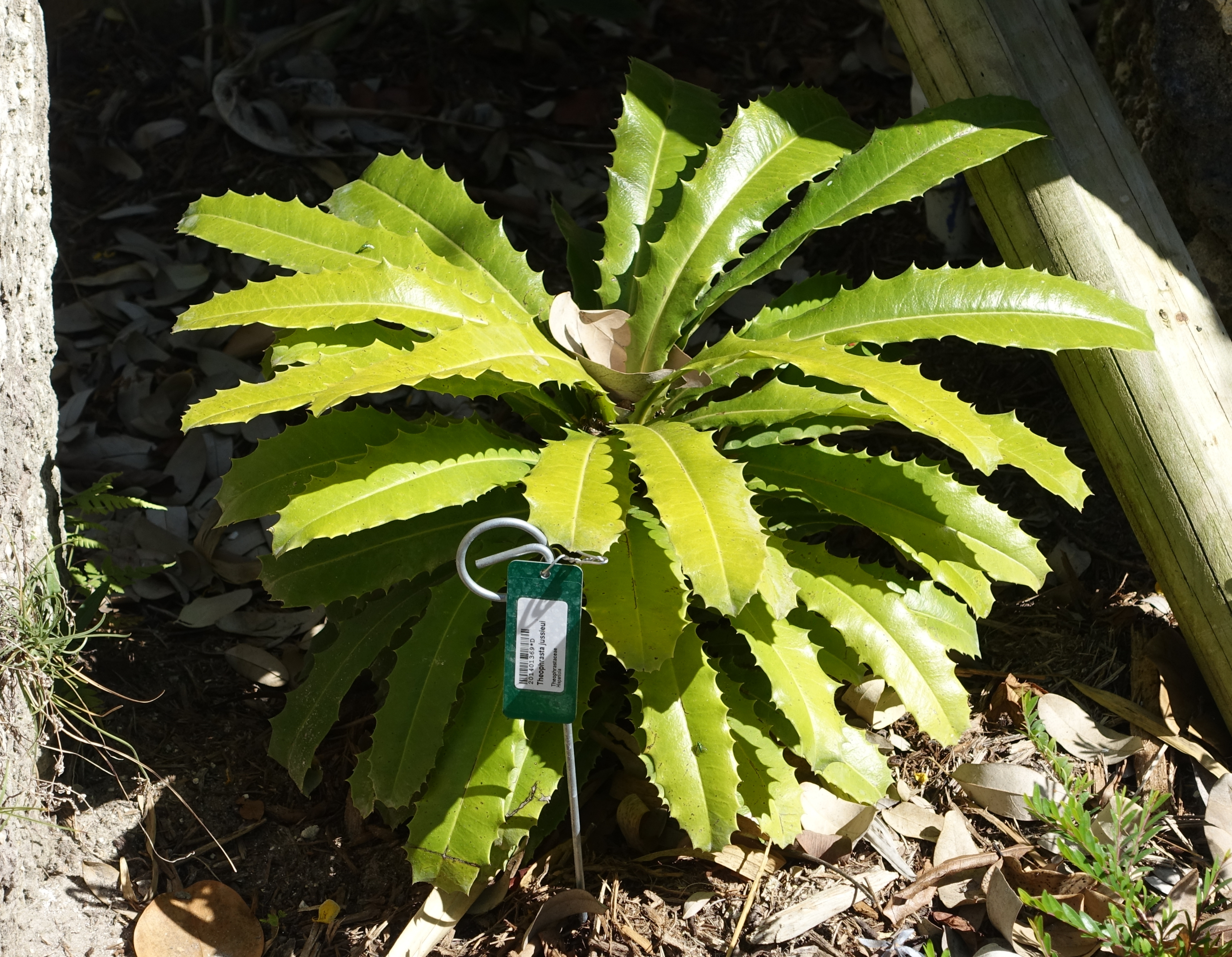
Theophrasta jussieui

===== Theophrastoideae A. DC. =====
Theophrastoideae consist of a relatively small subfamily, whose flowers are staminodial and bear berries. The ovary is superior, and the corolla is often tubular. The eight genera are confined to South and Central America. Samolus is a distinct genus, being sister to all other Theophrastoideae. Previously it formed its own tribe, Samoleae within Primulaceae s.s., and in some systems, its own family, Samolaceae, but was subsequently transferred to Theophrastoideae.

- Bonellia Bertero ex Colla
- Clavija Ruiz & Pav.
- Deherainia Decne.
- Jacquinia L.
- Neomezia Votsch
- Samolus L.
- Theophrasta L.
- Votschia B.Ståhl

=== Etymology ===
The Primulaceae are named for their nominative and type genus, Primula. Linnaeus used this name to reflect its place among the first flowers of spring, given the primrose's vernacular Latin name of primula veris (lit. 'little first of spring'), primula (feminine diminutive primus, first + veris (genitive ver, spring).

== Distribution and habitat ==
Distribution is cosmopolitan.

== Cultivation ==
The British National Collection of Double Primroses is held at Glebe Garden, at North Petherwin, in North Cornwall.

== Bibliography ==
=== Books ===
- Byng, James W. (2014). "Primulaceae". The Flowering Plants Handbook: A practical guide to families and genera of the world. Plant Gateway Ltd. pp. 399ff. ISBN 978-0-9929993-1-5.
- Christenhusz, Maarten J. M.; Fay, Michael F.; Chase, Mark W. (2017). "Primulaceae". Plants of the World: An Illustrated Encyclopedia of Vascular Plants. University of Chicago Press. p. 494. ISBN 978-0-226-52292-0.
- Kubitzki, K., ed. (2004). Celastrales, Oxalidales, Rosales, Cornales, Ericales. The Families and Genera of Vascular Plants. Vol. VI. Berlin: Springer-Verlag. doi:10.1007/978-3-662-07257-8. ISBN 978-3-662-07257-8. S2CID 12809916.
- Bhattacharyya, Bharati (2005). Systematic botany. Alpha Science International. pp. 216–218. ISBN 9781842652510.
- Cronquist, Arthur (1988) [1968]. The evolution and classification of flowering plants (2nd ed.). Bronx, N.Y., USA: New York Botanical Garden. ISBN 9780893273323. (Available here at Internet Archive)
- Datta, Subhash C. (1988). "Primulaceae". Systematic botany. New Age Intl. pp. 387–388. ISBN 9788122400137.
- Judd, W.S.; Campbell, C.S.; Kellogg, E.A.; Stevens, P.F.; Donoghue, M.J. (2002). "Ericales". Plant Systematics: A Phylogenetic Approach (2nd ed.). Sinauer Associates. pp. 425–436. ISBN 978-0-87893-403-4.
- Soltis, Douglas; Soltis, Pamela; Endress, Peter; Chase, M.W.; Manchester, Steven; Judd, Walter; Majure, Lucas; Mavrodiev, Evgeny (2018) [2005]. Phylogeny and Evolution of the Angiosperms: Revised and Updated Edition. University of Chicago Press. pp. 266, 269–271. ISBN 978-0-226-44175-7.
- Takhtajan, Armen Leonovich (1997). Diversity and Classification of Flowering Plants. Columbia University Press. ISBN 978-0-231-10098-4.(Available here at Internet Archive)
- Tomlinson, P. Barry (2016) [1986]. "Primulaceae (Myrinoideae: Myrsinaceae)". The Botany of Mangroves (2nd ed.). Cambridge University Press. pp. 302–308. ISBN 9781316790656.
- Xu, Zhenghao; Chang, Le (2017). "2. Primulaceae". Identification and Control of Common Weeds. 3 vols. Vol. 3 (3rd ed.). Springer. pp. 51–82. ISBN 978-981-10-5403-7.

==== Chapters ====
- Stahl, B; Anderberg, A. A. (2004). Maesaceae. pp. 255–257., in Kubitzki (2004)
- Stahl, B; Anderberg, A. A. (2004). Myrsinaceae. pp. 266–281., in Kubitzki (2004)
- Anderberg, A. A. (2004). Primulaceae. pp. 313–319., in Kubitzki (2004)
- Stahl, B (2004a). Samolaceae. pp. 387–389., in Kubitzki (2004)
- Stahl, B (2004). Theophrastaceae. pp. 472–478., in Kubitzki (2004)

==== Historical sources ====
- Batsch, August Johann Georg Karl (1793–1794). Synopsis vniversalis analytica genervm plantarvm fere omnivm hvcvsque cognitorum qvam secvndvm methodvm sexvalem corollinam, et carpologicam adivnctis ordinibvs naturalibvs adhibitis vltra Linnaeana monitis et adavctionibvs meritissimorvm Avbletii, Lovreirii, Forskolii, Thvnbergii, Forsteri, Vahlii, Gaertneri, Hedwigii, Schreberi, Ivssievii, Swarzii, et aliorum. 2 vols (in Latin). Ienae: Svmtibvs Bibliopolii Croekeriani.
- Borkhausen, Moritz Balthasar (1797). Botanisches Wörterbuch oder Versuch einer Erklärung der vornehmsten Begriffe und Kunstwörter in der Botanik, 2 Volumes [Botanical dictionary] (in German). Giessen: Georg Friedrich Heyer.
- Jussieu, Antoine Laurent de (1789). Genera plantarum: secundum ordines naturales disposita, juxta methodum in Horto regio parisiensi exaratam, anno M.DCC.LXXIV [Genera of Plants Arranged According to Their Natural Orders, Based on the Method Devised in the Royal Garden in Paris in the Year 1774] (in Latin). Paris. OCLC 5161409.(translated into French, with revisions, by Ventenat (1799) as Tableau du règne végétal selon la méthode de Jussieu)
- Linnaeus, Carl (1753). Species Plantarum: exhibentes plantas rite cognitas, ad genera relatas, cum differentiis specificis, nominibus trivialibus, synonymis selectis, locis natalibus, secundum systema sexuale digestas (1st. ed.). Stockholm: Impensis Laurentii Salvii.
- Pax, F; Knuth, R (1905). "Primulaceae". In Adolf Engler (ed.). Das Pflanzenreich: regni vegetablilis conspectus (in German). Vol. 4 (237) heft 22. Leipzig: Engelmann.
- Thomé, Otto Wilhelm (1903). "Primulaceae Plate 472". Flora von Deutschland, Österreich und der Schweiz. 4 vols (in German). Vol. IV. Gera: H. Bermühler. pp. 16–38.
- Ventenat, Étienne-Pierre (1799). Tableau du règne végétal, selon la méthode de Jussieu. 3 vols (in French). Paris: J. Drisonnier.

=== Articles ===
- Anderberg, Arne A.; Ståhl, Bertil (1995). "Phylogenetic interrelationships in the order Primulales, with special emphasis on the family circumscriptions". Canadian Journal of Botany. 73 (11): 169–91730. Bibcode:1995CaJB...73.1699A. doi:10.1139/b95-184.
- Anderberg, Arne A.; Ståhl, Bertil; Källersjö, Mari (1998). "Phylogenetic relationships in the Primulales inferred from rbcL sequence data". Plant Systematics and Evolution. 211 (1–2): 93–102. Bibcode:1998PSyEv.211...93A. doi:10.1007/BF00984914. S2CID 37418900.
- Christenhusz, Maarten JM & Byng, J. W. (2016). "The number of known plants species in the world and its annual increase". Phytotaxa. 261 (3): 201–217. Bibcode:2016Phytx.261..201C. doi:10.11646/phytotaxa.261.3.1.
- Martins, L.; Oberprieler, C.; Hellwig, F. H. (2003). "A phylogenetic analysis of Primulaceae s.l. based on internal transcribed spacer (ITS) DNA sequence data". Plant Systematics and Evolution. 237 (1–2): 75–85. Bibcode:2003PSyEv.237...75M. doi:10.1007/s00606-002-0258-1. S2CID 43988431.

==== Ericales ====
- Anderberg, A.A.; Rydin, C.; Kallersjo, M. (1 April 2002). "Phylogenetic relationships in the order Ericales s.l.: Analyses of molecular data from five genes from the plastid and mitochondrial genomes". American Journal of Botany. 89 (4): 677–687. doi:10.3732/ajb.89.4.677. PMID 21665668.
- Källersjö, M.; Bergqvist, G.; Anderberg, A.A. (2000). "Generic realignment in primuloid families of the Ericales s. l.: a phylogenetic analysis based on DNA sequences from three chloroplast genes and morphology". American Journal of Botany. 87 (9): 1325–41. Bibcode:2000AmJB...87.1325K. doi:10.2307/2656725. JSTOR 2656725. PMID 10991903.
- Schönenberger, Jürg; Anderberg, Arne A.; Sytsma, Kenneth J. (2005). "Molecular Phylogenetics and Patterns of Floral Evolution in the Ericales". International Journal of Plant Sciences. 166 (2): 265–288. Bibcode:2005IJPlS.166..265S. doi:10.1086/427198. JSTOR 10.1086/427198. S2CID 35461118.
- Rose, Jeffrey P.; Kleist, Thomas J.; Löfstrand, Stefan D.; Drew, Bryan T.; Schönenberger, Jürg; Sytsma, Kenneth J. (2018). "Phylogeny, historical biogeography, and diversification of angiosperm order Ericales suggest ancient Neotropical and East Asian connections" (PDF). Molecular Phylogenetics and Evolution. 122: 59–79. Bibcode:2018MolPE.122...59R. doi:10.1016/j.ympev.2018.01.014. PMID 29410353.

==== Maesoideae ====
- Anderberg, Arne A.; Ståhl, Bertil; Källersjö, Mari (May 2000). "Maesaceae, a new primuloid family in the order Ericales s.l.". Taxon. 49 (2): 183–187. Bibcode:2000Taxon..49..183A. doi:10.2307/1223834. JSTOR 1223834.

==== Myrsinoideae ====
- Anderberg, Arne A.; Manns, Ulrika; Källersjö, Mari (2007). "Phylogeny and Floral Evolution of the Lysimachieae (Ericales, Myrsinaceae): Evidence from ndhF Sequence Data". Willdenowia. 37 (2): 407–421. Bibcode:2007Willd..37..407A. doi:10.3372/wi.37.37202. JSTOR 20371369. S2CID 54660628.
- Yan, Xiaokai; Liu, Tongjian; Yuan, Xun; Xu, Yuan; Yan, Haifei; Hao, Gang (2019). "Chloroplast Genomes and Comparative Analyses among Thirteen Taxa within Myrsinaceae s.str. Clade (Myrsinoideae, Primulaceae)". International Journal of Molecular Sciences. 20 (18): 4534. doi:10.3390/ijms20184534. PMC 6769889. PMID 31540236.

==== Primuloideae ====
- Mast, Austin R.; Kelso, Sylvia; Richards, A. John; Lang, Daniela J.; Feller, Danielle M. S.; Conti, Elena (2001). "Phylogenetic Relationships in Primula L. and Related Genera (Primulaceae) Based on Noncoding Chloroplast DNA". International Journal of Plant Sciences. 162 (6): 1381–1400. Bibcode:2001IJPlS.162.1381M. doi:10.1086/323444. JSTOR 10.1086/323444. S2CID 59929813.
- Mast, Austin R.; Reveal, James L. (2007). "Transfer of Dodecatheon to Primula (Primulaceae)". Brittonia. 59 (1): 79. doi:10.1663/0007-196X(2007)59[79:TODTPP]2.0.CO;2. S2CID 36908769.
- Schneeweiss, Gerald M; Schönswetter, Peter; Kelso, Sylvia; Niklfeld, Harald (2004). "Complex Biogeographic Patterns in Androsace (Primulaceae) and Related Genera: Evidence from Phylogenetic Analyses of Nuclear Internal Transcribed Spacer and Plastid trnL-F Sequences". Systematic Biology. 53 (6): 856–876. doi:10.1080/10635150490522566. PMID 15764556.
- Trift, Ida; Källersjö, Mari; Anderberg, Arne A. (2002). "The Monophyly of Primula (Primulaceae) Evaluated by Analysis of Sequences from the Chloroplast Gene rbcL". Systematic Botany. 27 (2): 396–407. ISSN 0363-6445. JSTOR 3093879.

==== Theophrastoideae ====
- Källersjö, Mari; Ståhl, Bertil (2003). "Phylogeny of Theophrastaceae (Ericales s. lat.)". International Journal of Plant Sciences. 164 (4): 579–591. Bibcode:2003IJPlS.164..579K. doi:10.1086/375317. JSTOR 10.1086/375317. S2CID 83790795.
- Ståhl, Bertil (2010). "Theophrastaceae". Flora Neotropica. 105: 1–160.
- Wanntorp, Livia; Anderberg, Arne A. (2011). "Evolution And Diversification Of Brook Weeds (Samolus, Samolaceae, Ericales)". International Journal of Plant Sciences. 172 (2): 250–266. Bibcode:2011IJPlS.172..250W. doi:10.1086/657647. JSTOR 10.1086/657647. S2CID 84493389.

==== APG ====
- Angiosperm Phylogeny Group (1998), "An ordinal classification for the families of flowering plants", Annals of the Missouri Botanical Garden, 85 (4): 531–553, Bibcode:1998AnMBG..85..531., doi:10.2307/2992015, JSTOR 2992015
- Angiosperm Phylogeny Group II (2003), "An update of the Angiosperm Phylogeny Group classification for the orders and families of flowering plants: APG II", Botanical Journal of the Linnean Society, 141 (4), Bremer, B., K. Bremer, M.W. Chase, J.L. Reveal, D.E. Soltis, P.S. Soltis & P.F. Stevens: 399–436, doi:10.1046/j.1095-8339.2003.t01-1-00158.x
- Angiosperm Phylogeny Group III (October 2009), "An update of the Angiosperm Phylogeny Group classification for the orders and families of flowering plants: APG III", Botanical Journal of the Linnean Society, 161 (2), Bremer, B., K. Bremer, M.W. Chase, M.F. Fay, J.L. Reveal, D.E. Soltis, P.S. Soltis & P.F. Stevens: 105–121, doi:10.1111/j.1095-8339.2009.00996.x, hdl:10654/18083
- Angiosperm Phylogeny Group IV; Chase, M. W.; Christenhusz, J. M.; Fay, M. F.; Byng, J. W.; Judd, W. S.; Soltis, D. E.; Mabberley, D. J.; Sennikov, A. N.; Soltis, P. S.; Stevens, P. R. (2016), "An update of the Angiosperm Phylogeny Group classification for the orders and families of flowering plants: APG IV", Botanical Journal of the Linnean Society, 181 (1): 1–20, doi:10.1111/boj.12385

== Websites ==
- Utteridge, Timothy MA. "More than cowslips: Primulaceae goes tropical". Royal Botanic Gardens, Kew.
- Cholewa, Anita F; Kelso, Sylvia (2009). "Primulaceae". Flora of North America. New York: Oxford University Press.
- POWO (2021). "Primulaceae Batsch ex Borkh". Plants of the World Online. Royal Botanic Gardens, Kew.
- Elpel, Thomas J. (2021). "Primulaceae: Primrose Family. Identify plants and flowers". Wildflowers and Weeds.
- Byfield, Andy (2 June 2015). "Double primroses: pretty, difficult". Gardening blog. The Guardian.
- Stone, Caroline (2021). "Glebe Garden: National Collection Holder for Double Primroses: Primula vulgaris and hybrid cvs".
- Cornwall Gardens Trust (2021). "Double Primroses (National Primrose Collection) Launceston, PL15 8JX".
- "Primulaceae - Primrose Family". Montana Plant Life. 2018.
