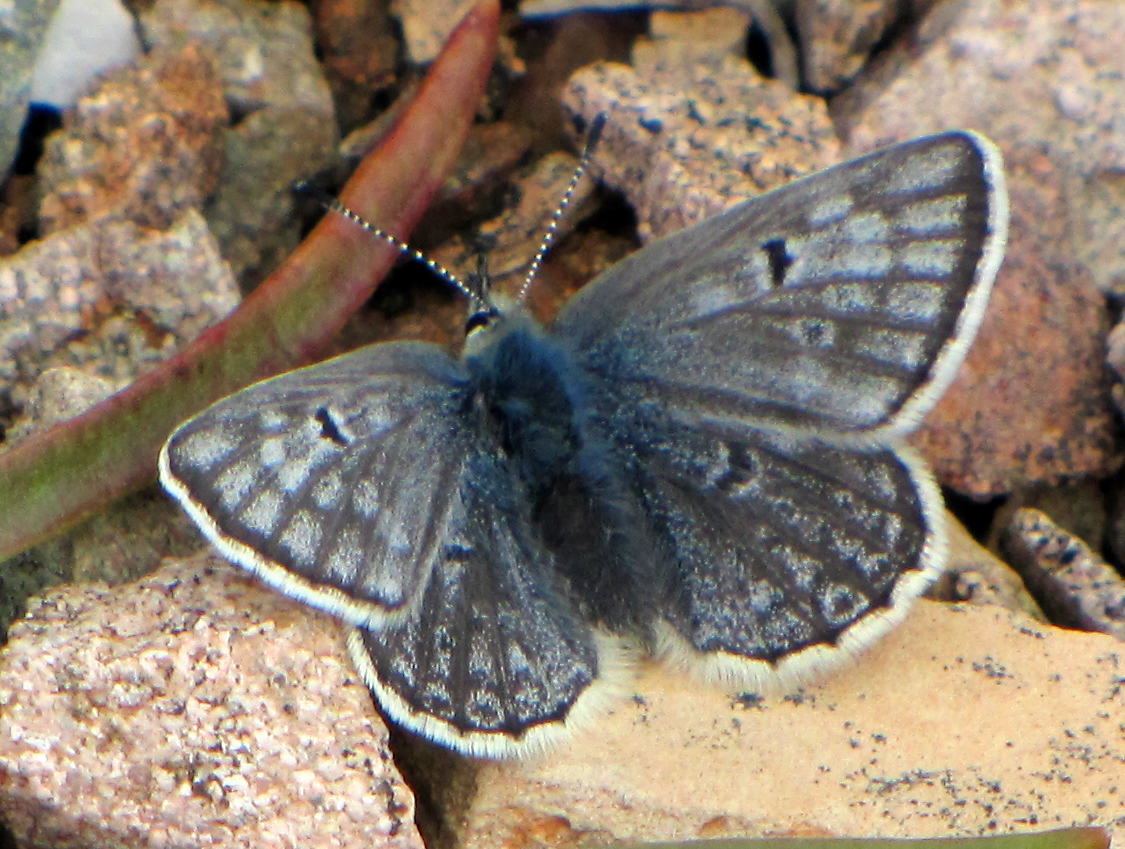
- A. g. Labrador, male, Cape Bonavista, Newfoundland and Labrador
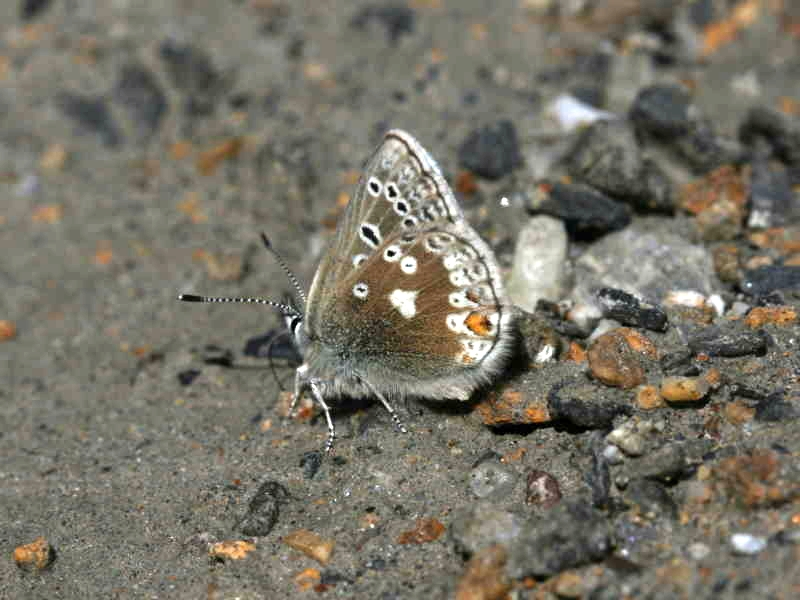

Conservation status
- Secure (NatureServe)

Scientific classification
- Kingdom: Animalia
- Phylum: Arthropoda
- Clade: Pancrustacea
- Class: Insecta
- Order: Lepidoptera
- Family: Lycaenidae
- Genus: Agriades
- Species: A. glandon

Binomial name
- Agriades glandon (de Prunner, 1798)

Synonyms
- Papilio glandon de Prunner, 1798; Plebejus glandon (de Prunner, 1798); Papilio orbitulus Esper, 1800

= Agriades glandon =

Species of butterfly

A. g. rustica, Banff, AB

Agriades glandon, the Arctic blue or Glandon blue, is a species of butterfly in the family Lycaenidae. It in found in Eurasia and North America.

== Range ==
In North America, this species is found from Alaska east to Newfoundland, south through the mountains to Washington, northern Arizona, and northern New Mexico. In Europe, it is found in mountainous areas like the Pyrenees and Alps, as well as the far north. It is also found in parts of Russia, including Siberia, and Kamchatka. Its habitats include arctic tundra, subarctic and subalpine forests, mountain meadows, and bogs.

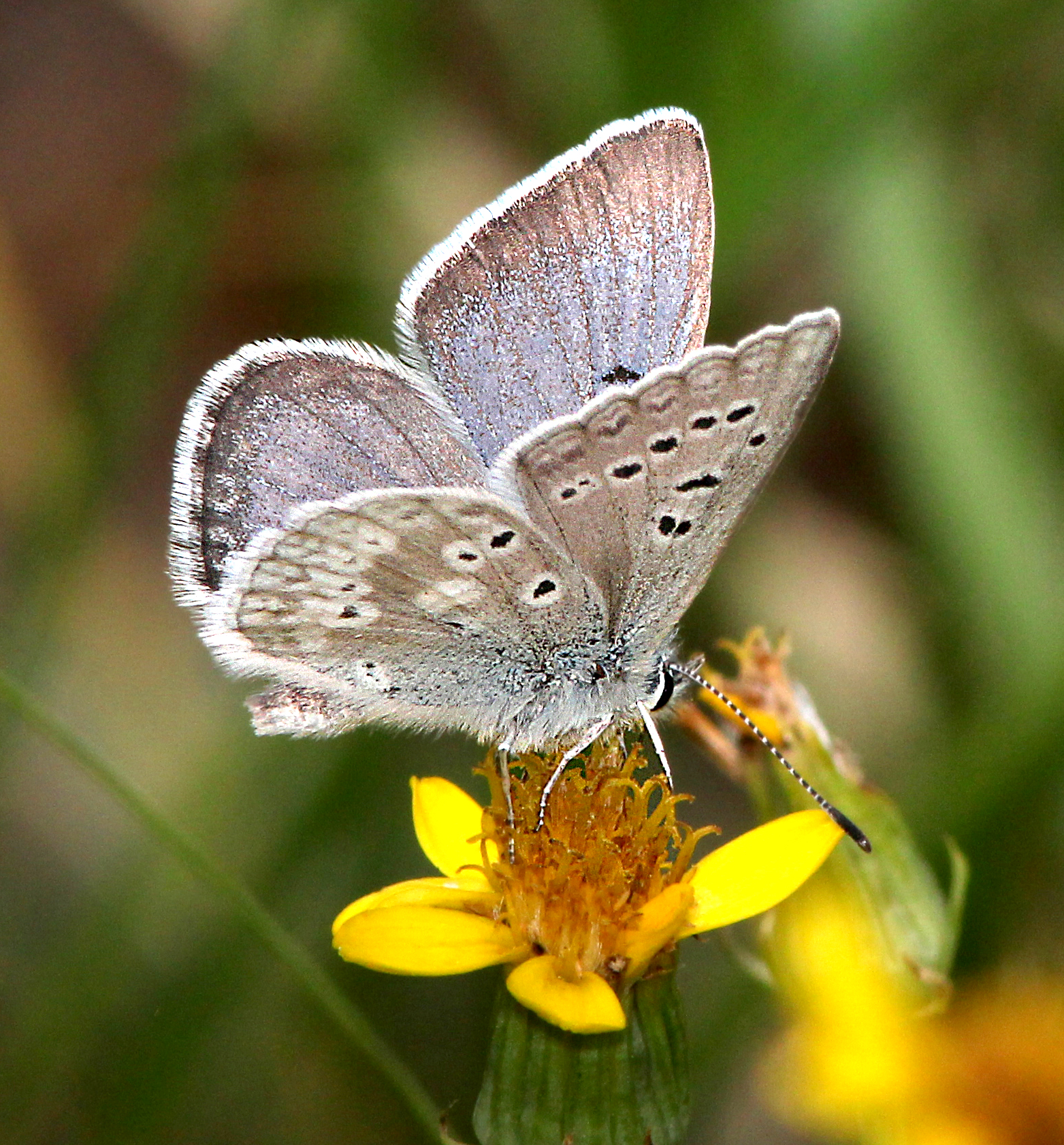

== Description ==
The wingspan is 17–26 mm. The male wing uppersides are silver-coloured, steely blue or pale shining blue and become increasingly brown towards the edges. The female wing uppersides are almost entirely brown but with a slightly bluish pollination in the basal region. The incidence of darkening increases with altitude. All wings usually have small, dark disk spots that are sometimes surrounded by white. Both sexes have white-rimmed black dots on the pale grey-brown ground of the forewing underside, while the underside of the hind wings reveals striking white spots and occasionally orange-colored dots on the greyish-brown ground.

Despite a large geographic variability in the pattern of the wing, the species is, in Europe, clearly distinguishable from other bluish species in a complex of three species widely separated geographically. Only two species overlap in range in Europe that could be confused. In the Alps and the Pyrenees, the more local and less frequent, Aricia nicias, has fine underside markings and a white stripe. In the Pyrenees, Agriades pyrenaicus may also fly in the same locations. In this species the underside forewing submarginal spots are bold black not faint grey-brown and the black markings on the underside hindwing are relatively greatly reduced or absent. Other similar species do not overlap in distribution. They are Agriades zullichi (Spain) and Agriades aquilo (Arctic Europe), and are sometimes viewed as subspecies of Agriades glandon.

== Ecology ==
The butterfly flies from mid-May to September depending on the location.

Clarke 2022 lists Astragalus alpinus, Saxifraga aizoides and Saxifraga oppositifolia as larval food plants in the European part of its range for Agriades aquilo. (Note: treated here as a subspecies of Agriades glandon)

For Agriades glandon, Clarke lists Androsace species A. alpina, A. chamaejasme, A. lactea, A. laggeri, A. obtusifolia, A. villosa and A. vitaliana; Soldanella alpina and Soldanella pusilla; and Oxytropis campestris. Further recorded food plants for Agriades glandon include Androsace bungeana and Androsace septentrionalis, Diapensia lapponica, Vaccinium, and Saxifraga species Saxifraga bronchialis and Saxifraga spinulosa.

== Subspecies and taxonomy ==
Several subspecies have been described:

- A. g. glandon (de Prunner, 1798) (Pyrenees, Alps)
- A. g. aquilo (Boisduval, 1832) (Arctic Europe and Arctic Canada)
- A. g. franklinii (Curtis, 1835) (Alaska)
- A. g. wosnesenskii (Ménétriés, 1855) (Srednesibirskoe, northeastern Siberia, Kamchatka) has the pale spots of underside smaller and more widely separated from one another, especially on the hindwing.
- A. g. rustica (Edwards, 1865) (Colorado)
- A. g. aquilina (Staudinger, 1901) (polar tundra of Siberia)
- A. g. megalo (McDunnough, 1927) (British Columbia)
- A. g. bryanti (Leussler, 1935) (Alaska, Northwest Territories)
- A. g. lacustris (Freeman, 1939) (Manitoba)
- A. g. centrohelvetica Rezbanyai-Reser, 1981 (Switzerland)
- A. g. punctatus Austin, 1998 (Arizona)
- A. g. cassiope Emmel & Emmel, 1998 (California)
- A. g. kelsoni Emmel & Emmel, 1998 (California)
- A. g. ustjuzhanini Yakivlev & Churkin, 2003 (Mongolia)
- A. g. saluki Churkin, 2005
- A. g. brutus Churkin, 2005 (eastern Sayan Mountains)
- A. g. rubini Churkin, 2005 (eastern Kazakhstan)
- A. g. batchimeg Churkin, 2005 (Mongolia)
- A. g. labrador Schmidt, Scott & Kondla, 2006 (Labrador, Newfoundland)

The relationships between these taxa are not yet fully understood. Many authors treat A. g. aquilo as a separate species. Some authors also consider all the above North American subspecies to belong to one separate species, which they call Agriades franklinii. Subspecies rustica and cassiope are sometimes also treated as valid species.
