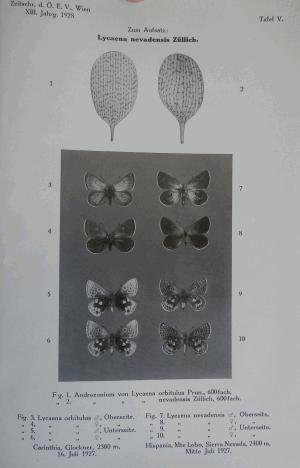
- as Lycaena nevadensis in Zullich

Conservation status
- Endangered (IUCN 3.1)

Scientific classification
- Kingdom: Animalia
- Phylum: Arthropoda
- Class: Insecta
- Order: Lepidoptera
- Family: Lycaenidae
- Genus: Agriades
- Species: A. zullichi

Binomial name
- Agriades zullichi Hemming, 1933

Synonyms
- Lycaena nevadensis Züllich, 1928; Plebejus zullichi (Hemming, 1933)

= Agriades zullichi =

Zullich's blue

Species of butterfly

Agriades zullichi (Zullich's blue) is a species of butterfly in the family Lycaenidae. It is endemic to Spain. It is a montane species (2,500–3,000 metres (8,200–9,800 ft)) confined to the Sierra Nevada. It is very similar to Agriades glandon and formerly was a subspecies of that taxon. The ground colour is more greyish. The larval foodplant is Androsace vitaliana.
