= Androsace brevis =

Scientific classification
- Kingdom: Plantae
- Clade: Tracheophytes
- Clade: Angiosperms
- Clade: Eudicots
- Clade: Asterids
- Order: Ericales
- Family: Primulaceae
- Genus: Androsace
- Species: A. brevis

Binomial name
- Androsace brevis (Hegetschw.) Cesati

Synonyms
- Aretia alpina Hegetschw.; Androsace charpentieri (Heer) Rchb.f.

Species of flowering plant

Androsace brevis is an alpine plant in the family Primulaceae, a narrow endemic cushion plant that grows above 2000 m asl on rocky ridges and peaks in a restricted area in the Alps of Northern Italy (Lombardy) and adjacent Switzerland. Following IUCN criteria, its conservation status is Vulnerable (VU). The flowering period is very short, typically lasting about 2 weeks between the end of May and the beginning of June, immediately after snowmelt, when snow still occurs in the vicinity.

== Genetic diversity and post-glacial history ==
Androsace brevis forms tight, wind-shorn cushions on acidic to slightly neutral, silica-rich rock ledges and ridges between 2,000–2,600 m (6,600–8,500 ft) in the southern Alps, mainly around Lake Como and the neighbouring valleys on the Swiss–Italian border. A population-genetic survey that compared the species with its eastern Alpine relative A. wulfeniana used amplified fragment length polymorphism (AFLP) markers to probe DNA variation across the whole genome. The study revealed that A. brevis carries very little genetic diversity: only about one-quarter of the DNA fragments examined varied at all, and identical genetic fingerprints were sometimes found in plants collected tens of kilometres apart. Such uniformity implies a severe genetic bottleneck in the recent past.

The same research detected no geographical structuring within the species' range—plants from Monte Legnone shared essentially the same DNA profile as those from the Val Muretto or the Bergamasque Alps. This pattern is most simply explained by survival through the last ice age in a single, small refugium followed by slow recolonisation of nearby peaks once the glaciers had retreated. In other words, today's scattered colonies are the descendants of a narrowly confined ancestral population that clung on above—or perhaps just beyond—the ice. The findings also make it clear that the plant's restricted modern distribution is not the result of any unusual ecological requirement: suitable siliceous screes and outcrops are widespread in the Alps, yet A. brevis has proved singularly poor at spreading beyond its historic stronghold.
