= Androsace saussurei =

Scientific classification
- Kingdom: Plantae
- Clade: Tracheophytes
- Clade: Angiosperms
- Clade: Eudicots
- Clade: Asterids
- Order: Ericales
- Family: Primulaceae
- Genus: Androsace
- Species: A. saussurei

Binomial name
- Androsace saussurei Dentant, Lavergne, F.C. Boucher & S. Ibanez

Synonyms
- Androsace pubescens auct. non DC.; Androsace alpina auct. non Lam.; Androsace albimontana D. Jord. & Jacquemoud ?

Species of flowering plant

Androsace saussurei is a plant species in the family Primulaceae.

== Taxonomy ==
Androsace saussurei was named after Horace Bénédict de Saussure, an eighteenth-century scientist from Geneva. The holotype was collected in Mont Blanc in Haute-Savoie of France.

== Description ==
Androsace saussurei is a perennial cushion plant species, usually 5–8 centimetres (2.0–3.1 in) high and 3–10 centimetres (1.2–3.9 in) in diameter. It is made of rosettes with diameters of 4.7–8.1 millimetres (0.19–0.32 in). It has hairy lanceolate leaves, usually 4.5–9.5 millimetres (0.18–0.37 in) long and 1.1–1.7 millimetres (0.043–0.067 in) wide. The flowers are white to purplish, 7 millimetres (0.28 in) in diameter. And the buds are often purplish as well. It typically flowers from June to August.

== Habitat and distribution ==
Androsace saussurei inhabit rock crevices on protogine and granite at elevations from 2,000 to 4,070 metres (6,560 to 13,350 ft), which is the highest elevation known for a vascular plant in Italy. It is endemic to the Western Alps (Mont Blanc, Gran Paradiso, Valais, Vanoise, Thabor).
