= Androsace delphinensis =

Scientific classification
- Kingdom: Plantae
- Clade: Embryophytes
- Clade: Tracheophytes
- Clade: Angiosperms
- Clade: Eudicots
- Clade: Asterids
- Order: Ericales
- Family: Primulaceae
- Genus: Androsace
- Species: A. delphinensis

Binomial name
- Androsace delphinensis Dentant, Lavergne, F.C. Boucher & S. Ibanez

Synonyms
- Androsace pubescens auct. non DC.

Species of flowering plant

Androsace delphinensis is a plant species in the family Primulaceae.

== Taxonomy ==
Androsace delphinensis was named after the region of Dauphiné, a former French province in the southern French Alps. The holotype was collected in Pic Coolidge in Ecrins in Hautes-Alpes of France.

== Description ==
Androsace delphinensis is a perennial cushion plant species, usually 5–10 centimetres (2.0–3.9 in) high and 3–20 centimetres (1.2–7.9 in) in diameter. It is made of loose to slightly compact rosettes. It has hairy lanceolate leaves, usually 7–10 millimetres (0.28–0.39 in) long and 1–1.5 millimetres (0.039–0.059 in) wide. Its hairs are often branched with a short branch at the top, sometimes broken. The flowers are always white, 7–8 millimetres (0.28–0.31 in) in diameter. It typically flowers from June to August.

== Habitat and distribution ==
Androsace delphinensis inhabit rock crevices on gneiss, granite, sandstone and flysch at elevations from 2,400 to 3,850 metres (7,870 to 12,630 ft). This species is endemic to the southwestern Alps (Écrins, Grandes Rousses, Belledonne).
