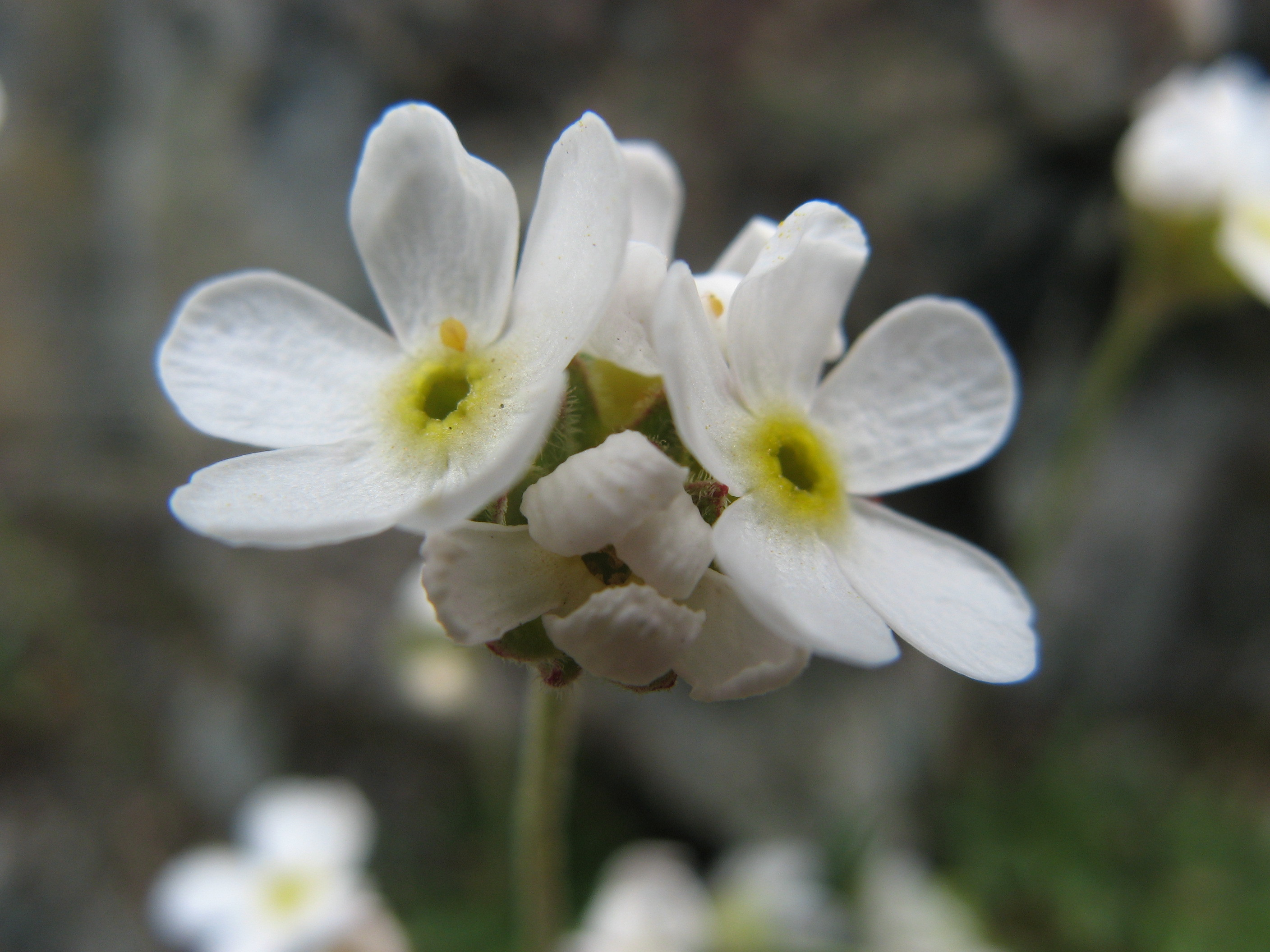

Scientific classification
- Kingdom: Plantae
- Clade: Tracheophytes
- Clade: Angiosperms
- Clade: Eudicots
- Clade: Asterids
- Order: Ericales
- Family: Primulaceae
- Genus: Androsace
- Species: A. albana

Binomial name
- Androsace albana Steven

Synonyms
- Androsace longifolia K.Koch; Androsace valerianoides Lehm. ex Spreng.; Androsace wiedemannii Boiss.; Primula albana (Steven) Kuntze

= Androsace albana =

Species of flowering plant

Androsace albana is a species of flowering plant in the primrose family, Primulaceae. It is native to Iran, the Transcaucasus and Turkey. It was first described by Christian von Steven in 1812.
