= Androsace filicula =

Scientific classification
- Kingdom: Plantae
- Clade: Tracheophytes
- Clade: Angiosperms
- Clade: Eudicots
- Clade: Asterids
- Order: Ericales
- Family: Primulaceae
- Genus: Androsace
- Species: A. filicula

Binomial name
- Androsace filicula (Maxim.) Heng C.Wang & Jiao Sun

Synonyms
- Pomatosace filicula Maxim.

Species of plants

Androsace filicula is a species of flowering plant in the family Primulaceae, which was previously placed in its own genus, Pomatosace, endemic to the Qinghai–Tibetan Plateau in China.

== Description ==
Androsace filicula is a biennial plant that grows from rosettes of basal leaves, each 15–90 millimetres (0.6–3.5 in) long and 6–15 mm (0.2–0.6 in) wide and divided into lobes along its length; the leaves may be reminiscent of a fern, providing the species' epithet, filicula (diminutive of Latin filix, "fern"). The flowers are borne in umbels of 3–12 flowers on a stalk 1–16 centimetres (0.4–6.3 in) tall. Each flower is white, with five petals fused into a tube for around 2 mm (0.08 in). Seeds are produced in a capsule, which is approximately 4 mm (0.16 in) wide.

== Distribution and ecology ==
Androsace filicula is only found in the north-eastern part of the Qinghai–Tibetan Plateau, in the Chinese provinces of Sichuan, Xizang (Tibet) and Qinghai. It grows in a variety of habitats, including alpine meadows and sand flats along rivers, at altitudes of 2,800–4,500 metres (9,200–14,800 ft). It flowers from May to June, and fruits from June to August. It is thought to have evolved to inhabit the open ground in front of the burrows of plateau pikas (Ochotona curzoniae) and other ground-dwelling mammals.

== Taxonomy ==
Androsace filicula was the only species in the genus Pomatosace, as described by Karl Maximovich in 1881. Type specimens were collected from western Gansu Province in the Qing Dynasty, which however is now part of Xining, Guide and Guinan in Qinghai Province.

More recent molecular phylogenetic data have shown, however, that Pomatosace is nested within Androsace. In the revised classification to create monophyletic genera, Pomatosace was merged into Androsace.
