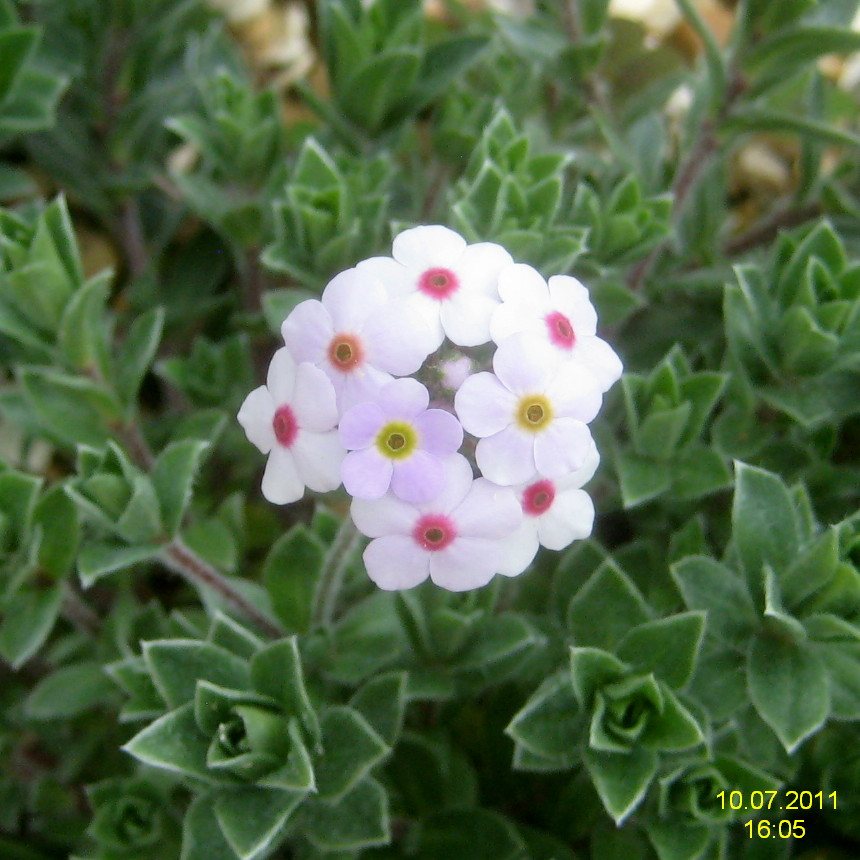

Scientific classification
- Kingdom: Plantae
- Clade: Tracheophytes
- Clade: Angiosperms
- Clade: Eudicots
- Clade: Asterids
- Order: Ericales
- Family: Primulaceae
- Genus: Androsace
- Species: A. lanuginosa

Binomial name
- Androsace lanuginosa Wall.

Synonyms
- Primula lanuginosa (Wall.) Kuntze

= Androsace lanuginosa =

Species of plant in the genus Androsace

Androsace lanuginosa, called the woolly rock jasmine, is a species of flowering plant in the genus Androsace, native to the western Himalaya. It has gained the Royal Horticultural Society's Award of Garden Merit.

The plant is composed of trailing stems that are reddish when young. They bear small, pointed, hairy, grey-green leaves. In the summer, the plant produces flowers made up of up to 15 florets, usually light pink with a dark pink eye or lilac with a yellow-green eye. A. lanuginosa grows well in most soils with full sun to part shade, and typically reaches about 10 centimeters tall and 30 centimeters wide. In the US, it is suitable for zones 5–8. It may be susceptible to aphids and leaf spot.
