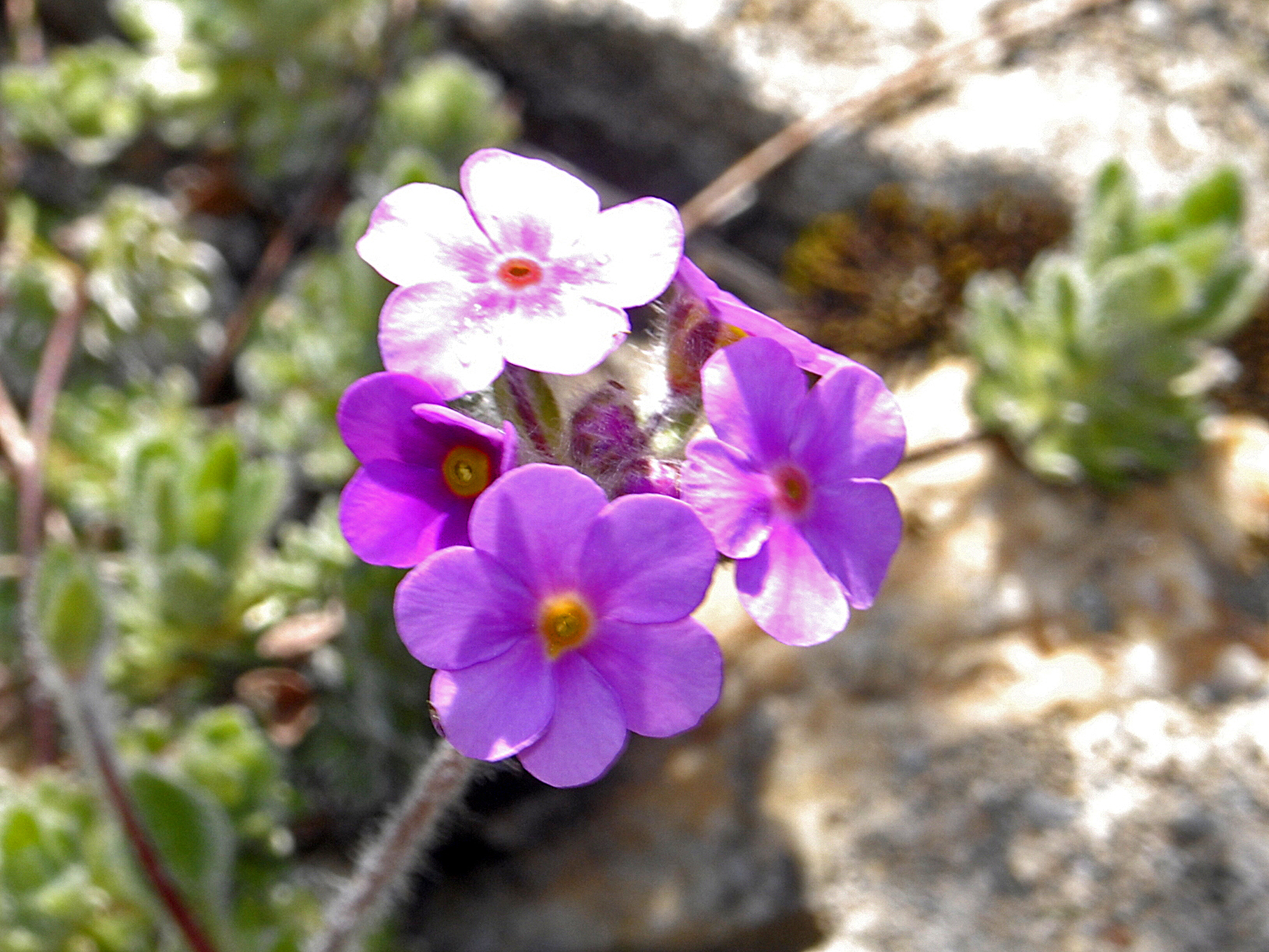
- Flowers of Androsace sarmentosa at the Giardino Botanico Alpino Chanousia
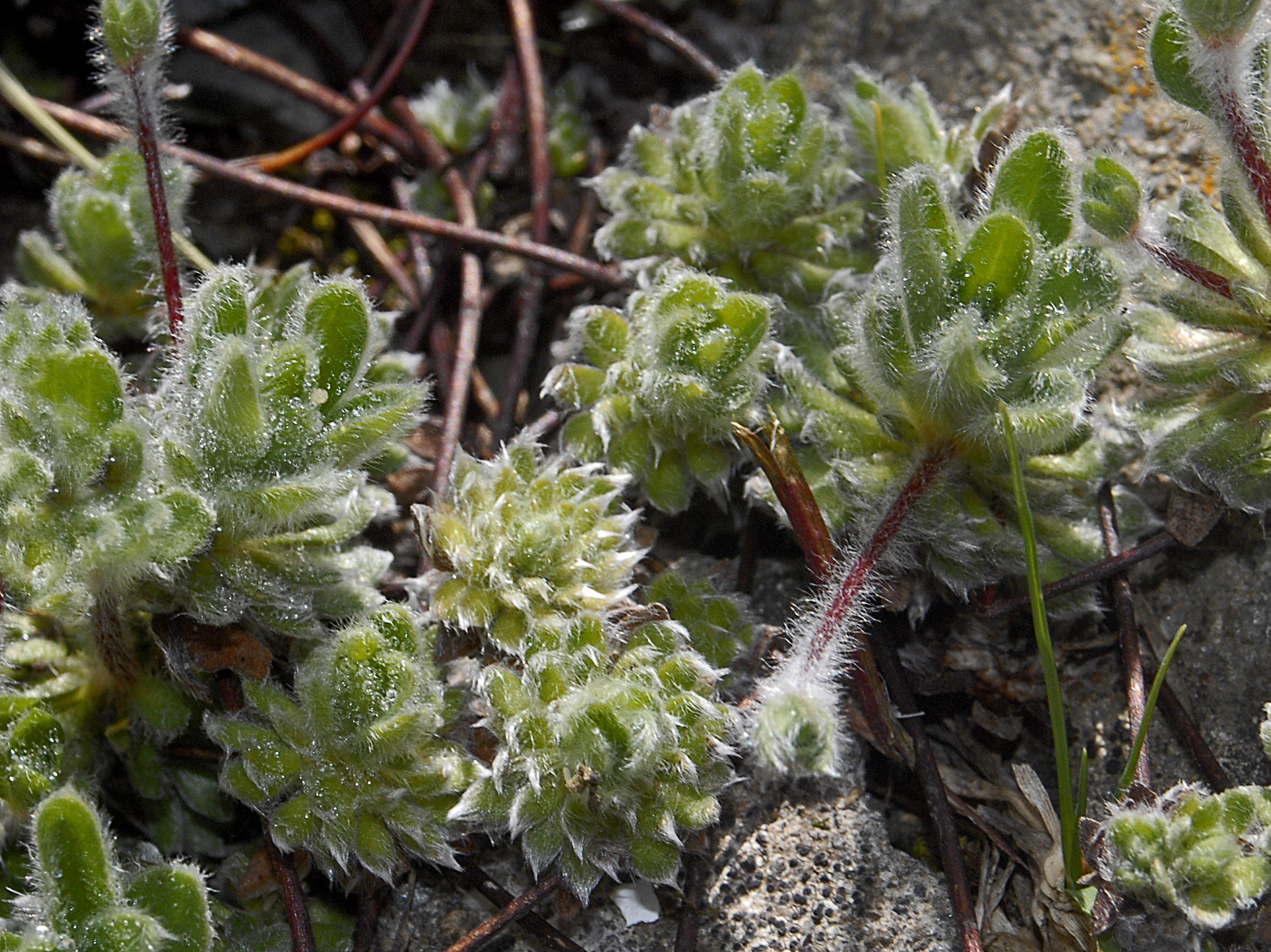
- Plants of Androsace sarmentosa at the Giardino Botanico Alpino Chanousia

Scientific classification
- Kingdom: Plantae
- Clade: Tracheophytes
- Clade: Angiosperms
- Clade: Eudicots
- Clade: Asterids
- Order: Ericales
- Family: Primulaceae
- Genus: Androsace
- Species: A. sarmentosa

Binomial name
- Androsace sarmentosa Wall.

Synonyms
- List: Androsace chumbyi Pax & R.Knuth; Androsace dubyi (Dergnac) N.P.Balakr.; Androsace primuloides Duby; Androsace sarmentosa var. primuloides Hook.f.; Androsace studiosorum Kress; Primula sarmentosa (Wall.) Kuntze

= Androsace sarmentosa =

Species of flowering plant

Androsace sarmentosa, the rock jasmine, is a Perennial Plant in the family Primulaceae, native to the Himalayas and Tibet. As its synonym, Androsace studiosorum, it has gained the Royal Horticultural Society's Award of Garden Merit.

== Description ==
Androsace sarmentosa can reach about 30 cm (12 in) in diameter. It forms deep-green evergreen compact rosettes of elliptic-oblanceolate leaves, 1–3 cm (0.39–1.18 in) in width, covered with short white hairs. Flowers are bright pink to purple with a yellow center, 7–9 mm (0.28–0.35 in) in diameter, with umbels 4–10 mm (0.16–0.39 in) tall. It blooms from June to August.

== Distribution and habitat ==
Androsace sarmentosa is native to the Himalayas, including Nepal, and Tibet. It prefers mixed forests, rocky slopes and open woodland, at an elevation 2,700–4,000 m (8,900–13,100 ft) above sea level.
