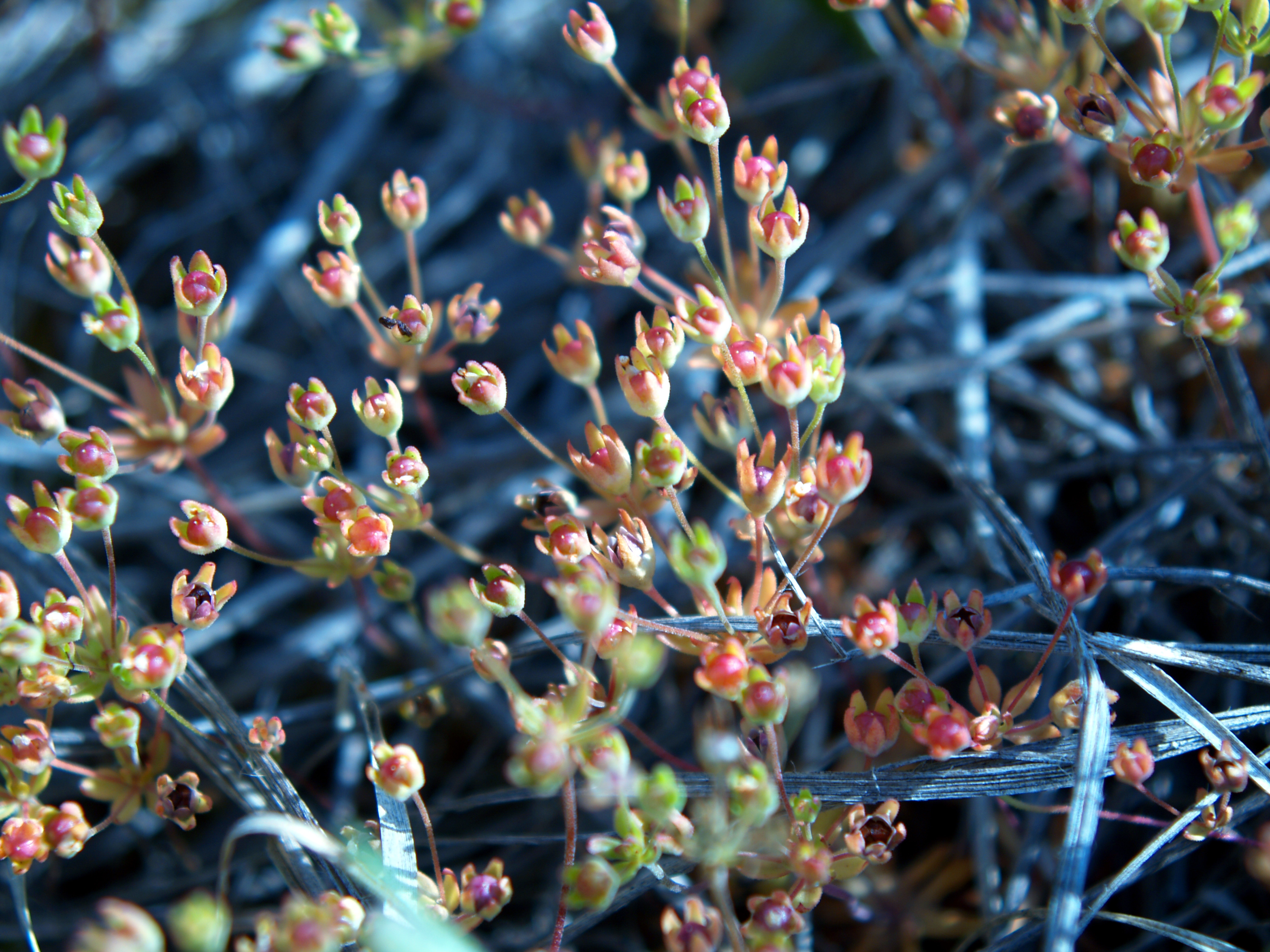

Scientific classification
- Kingdom: Plantae
- Clade: Tracheophytes
- Clade: Angiosperms
- Clade: Eudicots
- Clade: Asterids
- Order: Ericales
- Family: Primulaceae
- Genus: Androsace
- Species: A. occidentalis

Binomial name
- Androsace occidentalis Pursh

Synonyms
- Androsace arizonica

= Androsace occidentalis =

Species of flowering plant

Androsace occidentalis is a species of flowering plant in the primrose family known by the common name western rockjasmine and western fairy candelabra.

It is native to much of southern central and western Canada, and the midwestern and western United States, from the Great Lakes region south to Texas, and west across the Great Plains to Idaho, Utah, and the Sierra Nevada in California.

It occurs in open habitat such as prairies and meadows and in disturbed areas.

== Description ==
Androsace occidentalis is a diminutive annual herb reaching a maximum height of about 7 centimeters. It grows from a basal rosette of oblong hairy leaves no more than one or two centimeters long.

It produces an erect inflorescence which is an umbel atop a thin, naked peduncle. The umbel is composed of 5 to 10 tiny flowers, each on a pedicel up to 3 centimeters long. The flowers have a white or pinkish five-lobed corolla inside a cup of pointed reddish sepals.
