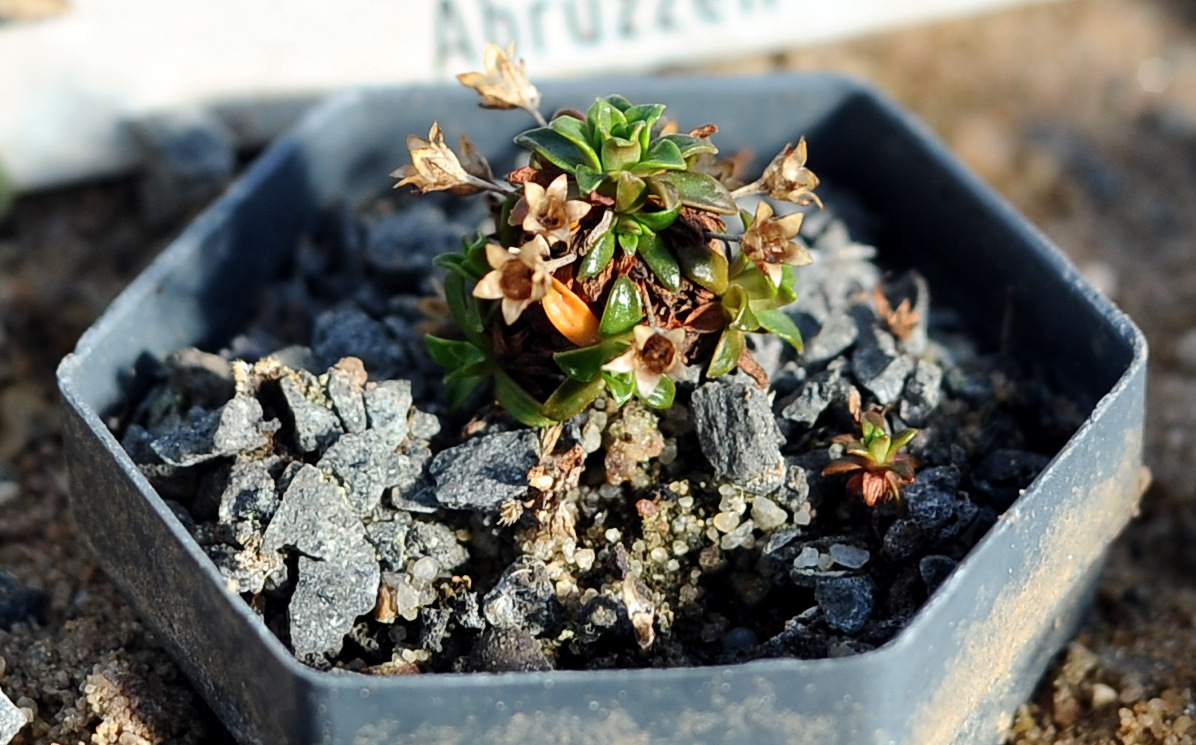

Scientific classification
- Kingdom: Plantae
- Clade: Tracheophytes
- Clade: Angiosperms
- Clade: Eudicots
- Clade: Asterids
- Order: Ericales
- Family: Primulaceae
- Genus: Androsace
- Species: A. mathildae

Binomial name
- Androsace mathildae Levier

= Androsace mathildae =

Species of flowering plant

Androsace mathildae is an alpine cushion plant in the family Primulaceae, endemic to the Abruzzo Apennines in Italy. This species is included in Appendix I of the Berne Convention on the Conservation of European Wildlife and Natural Habitats, in Annex II and IV Habitats Directive 92/43 CEE, and is protected under Regional Law n. 45/79 of the Abruzzo Italian Region.
