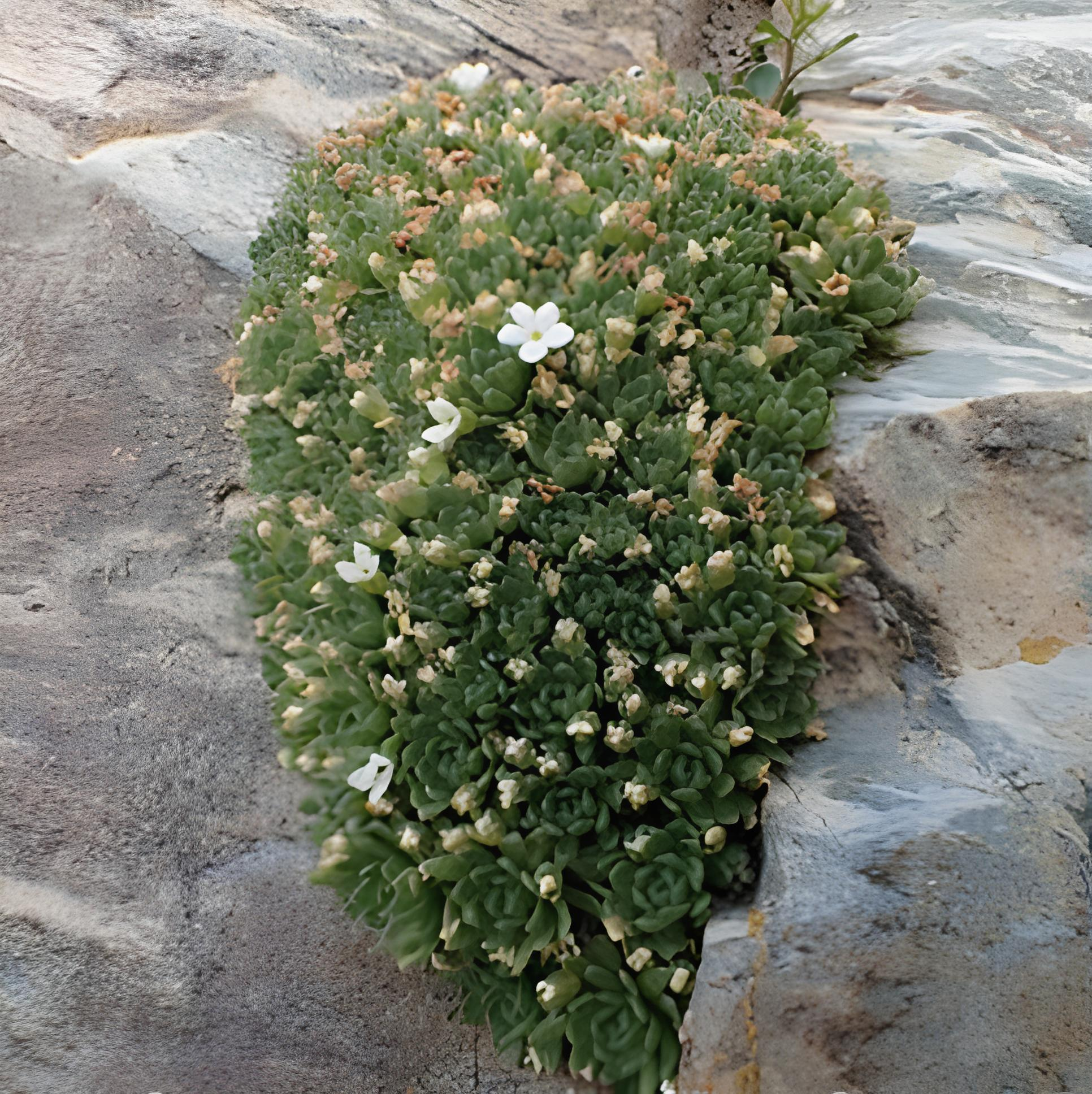
- Androsace vesulensis Dentant

Scientific classification
- Kingdom: Plantae
- Clade: Embryophytes
- Clade: Tracheophytes
- Clade: Angiosperms
- Clade: Eudicots
- Clade: Asterids
- Order: Ericales
- Family: Primulaceae
- Genus: Androsace
- Species: A. vesulensis

Binomial name
- Androsace vesulensis Dentant, Lavergne, F.C. Boucher & S. Ibanez

Synonyms
- Androsace pubescens auct. non DC.; Androsace alpina auct. non Lam.

= Androsace vesulensis =

Species of flowering plant

Androsace vesulensis is a plant species in the family Primulaceae.

== Taxonomy ==
Androsace vesulensis was named after Monte Viso, a mountain in the southwestern Italian Alps, where the holotype was collected.

== Description ==
Androsace saussurei is a perennial cushion plant species, usually 5–8 centimetres (2.0–3.1 in) high and 3–10 centimetres (1.2–3.9 in) in diameter. It is made of loose to slightly compact rosettes. It has hairy lanceolate leaves, usually 5–6.3 millimetres (0.20–0.25 in) long and 1–2.2 millimetres (0.039–0.087 in) wide. The hairs are deer-antler-shaped, 0.1–0.2 millimetres (0.0039–0.0079 in) long and mainly on the edges. The flowers are always white, 7 millimetres (0.28 in) in diameter. It typically flowers from June to August.

== Habitat and distribution ==
Androsace vesulensis inhabit rock crevices on ophiolite (basalt, gabbro and serpentine) at elevations from 2,800 to 3,800 metres (9,200 to 12,500 ft). This species is endemic to Monte Viso and neighboring ophiolite summits (Italy and France).
