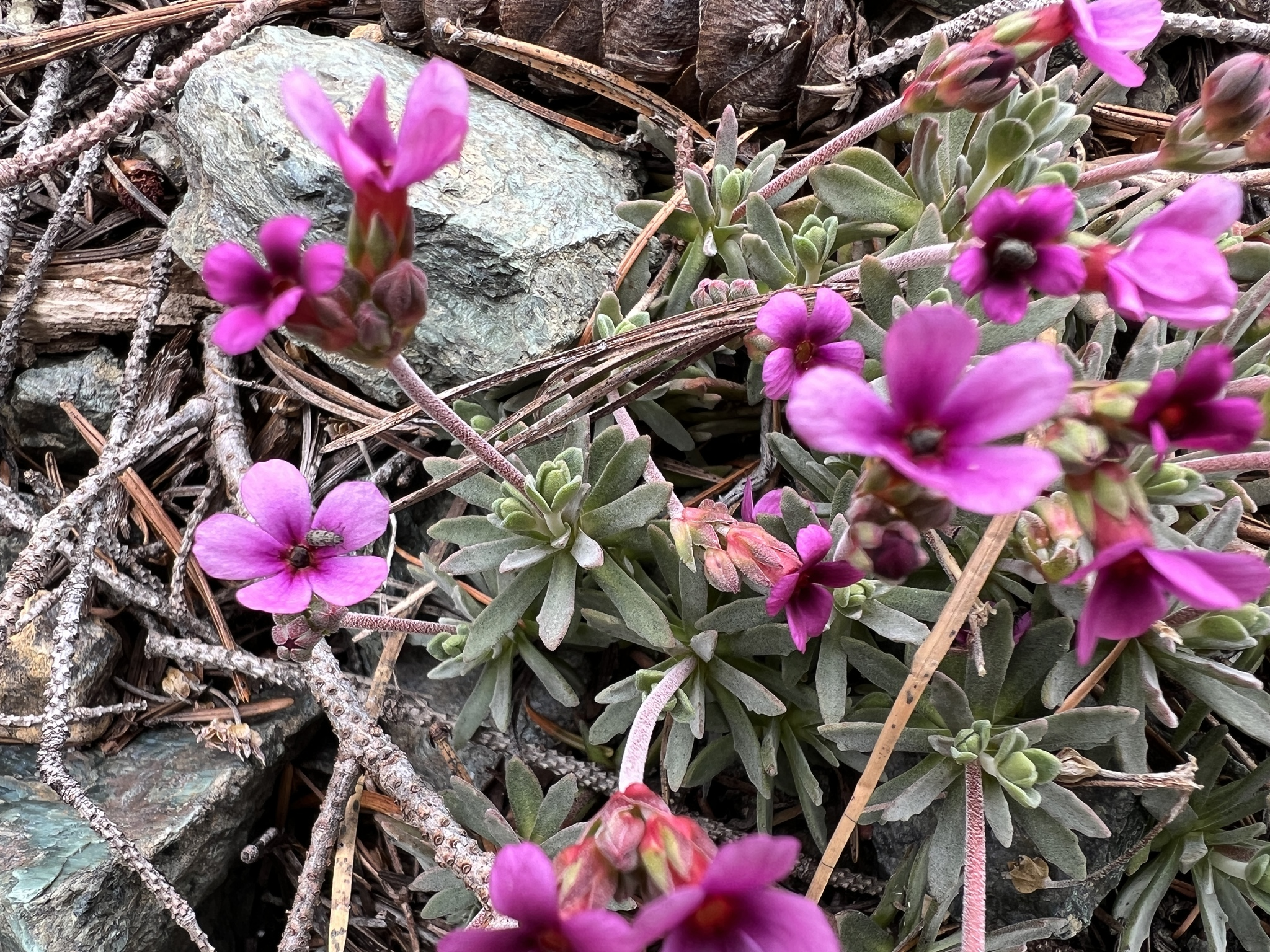

Scientific classification
- Kingdom: Plantae
- Clade: Tracheophytes
- Clade: Angiosperms
- Clade: Eudicots
- Clade: Asterids
- Order: Ericales
- Family: Primulaceae
- Genus: Androsace
- Species: A. nivalis

Binomial name
- Androsace nivalis (Lindl.) Wendelbo

= Androsace nivalis =

Species of plant

Androsace nivalis is a species of flowering plant in the primrose family Primulaceae with the common name snow dwarf-primrose. It was previously placed in the genus Douglasia, which is now known to be nested within Androsace.

== Description ==
Androsace nivalis forms low clumps to extended mats with small dentate (sometimes entire) broadly lanceolate to linear leaves arranged in rosettes. Leaf surfaces and flower stems are covered with short stellate or branched hairs. Flower stems arise from leaf axils and give rise to small terminal clusters. The showy flowers have 5 pinkish purple petals, usually with a darker purple throat. Flower clusters are held well above the mat-like foliage.

== Range ==
Androsace nivalis is endemic to the Wenatchee Mountains in Washington state and nearby areas.

== Habitat ==
Androsace nivalis grows in open forest and dry rocky slopes and meadows from about 600 m elevation to the alpine zone, often on rocky serpentine soils.

== Etymology ==
The species name nivalis (Latin "snow covered") refers to the fact that the plant emerges early in spring, often when snow is still on the ground.

== Taxonomy ==
Androsace nivalis contains the following subspecies:

- Androsace nivalis subsp. weygaertii
- Androsace nivalis subsp. nivalis
