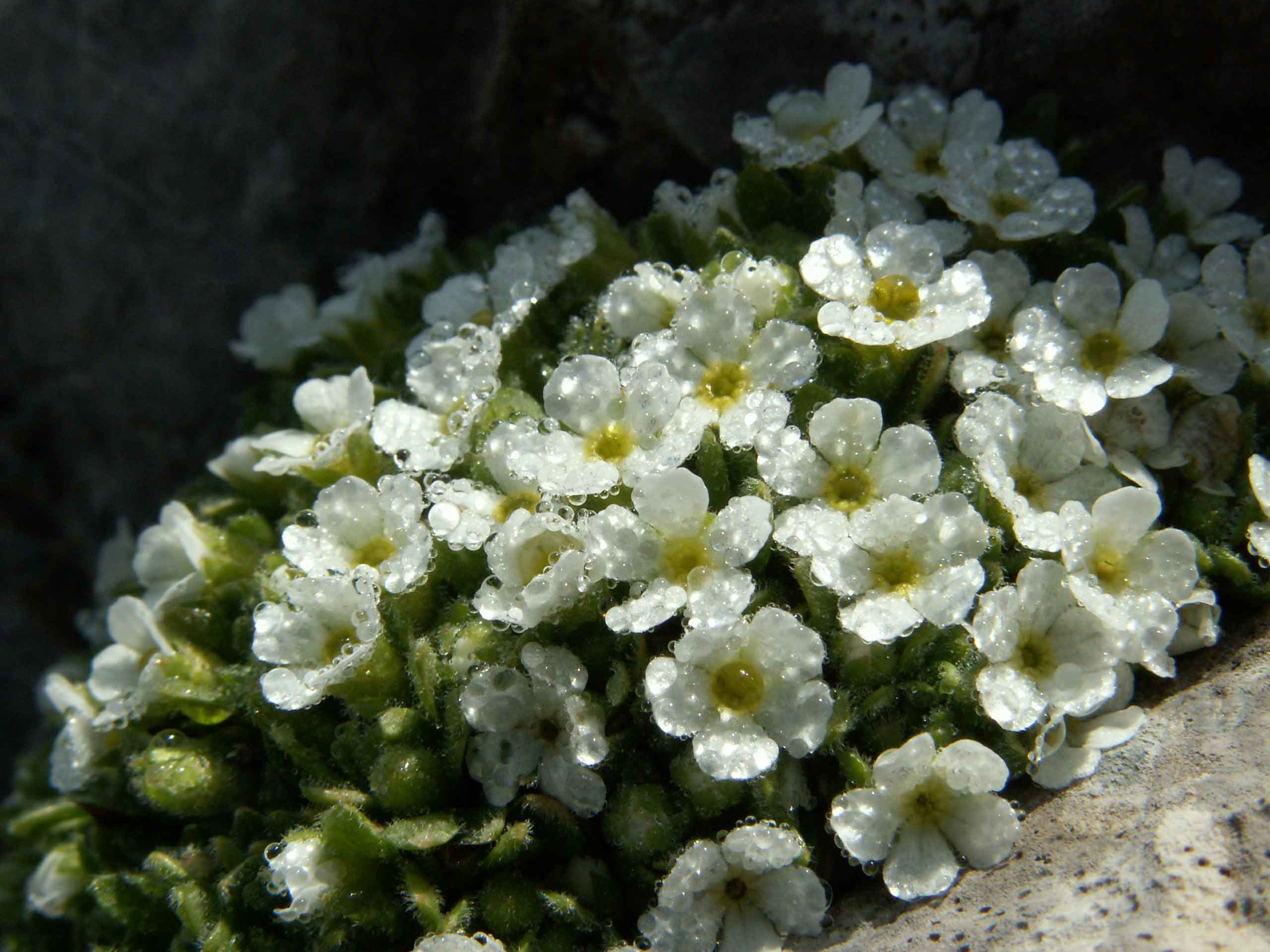

Scientific classification
- Kingdom: Plantae
- Clade: Tracheophytes
- Clade: Angiosperms
- Clade: Eudicots
- Clade: Asterids
- Order: Ericales
- Family: Primulaceae
- Genus: Androsace
- Species: A. helvetica

Binomial name
- Androsace helvetica (L.) All.

Synonyms
- Aretia helvetica (L.) L.; Androsace imbricata Lam.

= Androsace helvetica =

Species of flowering plant

Androsace helvetica is a plant in the family Primulaceae. Androsace helvetica is widely distributed in the Alps, where it is absent from areas with siliceous bedrock and is rare and scattered in the south-eastern Alps east of the Dolomites. Several occurrences are known from the central Pyrenees. It is a characteristic species of alpine and subnival communities on dry and exposed limestone rocks or calcareous schists. It forms dense, often hemispherical cushions, with imbricate dead leaves below the leaf rosette and exclusively simple hairs on the leaves.
