= Androsace americana =

Scientific classification
- Kingdom: Plantae
- Clade: Tracheophytes
- Clade: Angiosperms
- Clade: Eudicots
- Clade: Asterids
- Order: Ericales
- Family: Primulaceae
- Genus: Androsace
- Species: A. americana

Binomial name
- Androsace americana Wendelbo

Synonyms
- Douglasia arctica Hook.; Douglasia nivalis var. glabra Duby; Gregoria arctica (Hook.) House; Primula linearis Kuntze

Species of flowering plant

Androsace americana, synonym Douglasia arctica, known as the Mackenzie River dwarf primrose, is a species of flowering plant in the primrose family, Primulaceae. It is native to subarctic North America (Alaska, the Northwest Territories and Yukon).

== Taxonomy ==
The species was first described by William Jackson Hooker in 1838 as Douglasia arctica. Molecular phylogenetic studies showed that the genus Douglasia is nested within Androsace. The name "Androsace artica" was published in 1826 for a different species (now regarded as a synonym of Androsace ochotensis), so the replacement name Androsace americana, published by Per Wendelbo in 1961, is used instead.

== Description ==
Androsace americana are relatively small, usually found as mats growing up to about 2 inches tall. They have a single, short stem that protrude from each rosette of leaves. Leaves are smooth and closely packed, forming rosettes of leaves that reach an average of 3/8 inches long. Androsace americana typically flowers in june. Pink petals are most commonly observed, but white petals can occur with older, more mature plants. Petals are deeply lobed and fuse at the bottom to form the flower. Scapes are generally 2 mm in early anthesis, but range from 2–4 cm in fruits, and are typically glandular and hairy, but can sometimes be hairless.

== Phenology ==
Androsace americana has been described as both a perennial and as a long-lived cushion. It has been suggested that as a cushion, the plant's canopy functions as a buffer for temperature variation, allowing for elevated temperature inside the plant.

== Distribution and habitat ==
Androsace americana, like other Androsace species, are found in cold climates Androsace americana is native to Northern America as well as Subarctic America, and it is typically found in Alaska, Northwest Territories, Yukon, and Canada. It prefers to grow on rocky and mossy slopes.
