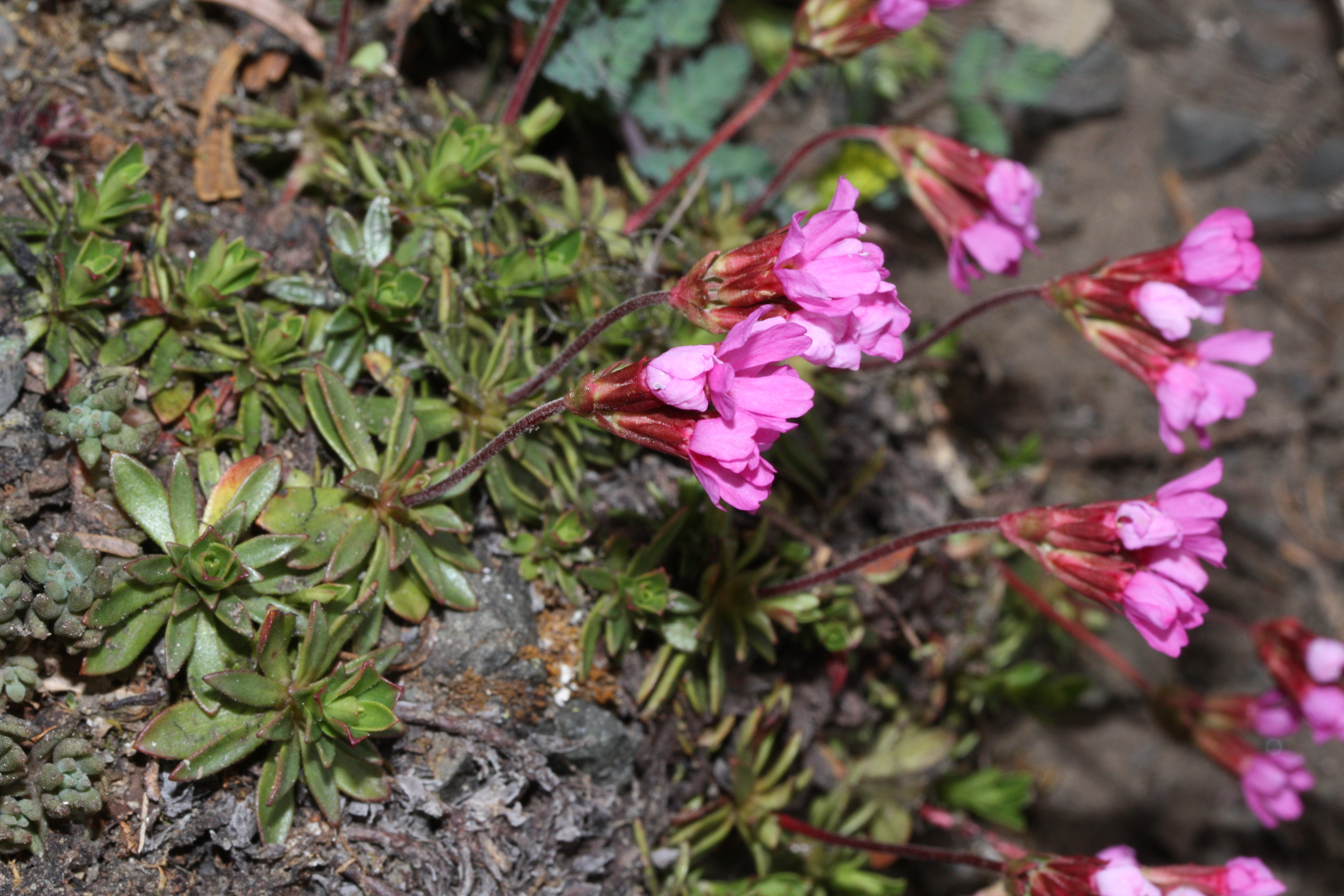
- Growing in Olympic National Park, Washington

Scientific classification
- Kingdom: Plantae
- Clade: Tracheophytes
- Clade: Angiosperms
- Clade: Eudicots
- Clade: Asterids
- Order: Ericales
- Family: Primulaceae
- Genus: Androsace
- Species: A. laevigata

Binomial name
- Androsace laevigata (A.Gray) Wendelbo

Synonyms
- Douglasia laevigata A.Gray; Gregoria laevigata (A.Gray) House; Primula laevigata (A.Gray) Derganc

= Androsace laevigata =

Species of flowering plant

Androsace laevigata, synonym Douglasia laevigata, known as the cliff dwarf primrose, is a species of flowering plant in the primrose family, Primulaceae. It is native to the central Pacific coastal mountains of North America (west of the crest of the Cascade Range of British Columbia, Oregon and Washington) below 2,400 metres (8,000 ft) elevation. Its habitat includes cliffs, rocks, and alpine.

== Description ==
Androsace laevigata is a small mat-forming herbaceous perennial plant about 2–7 cm (0.8–2.8 in) high. The five-lobed flowers are deep pink to rose. Each lobe is 4–5 mm (0.2–0.2 in) mm long.

== Taxonomy ==
Androsace laevigata was first described by Asa Gray in 1880 as Douglasia laevigata. Molecular phylogenetic studies showed that the genus Douglasia is nested within Androsace, and the transfer to Androsace by Wendelbo in 1961 is now accepted.

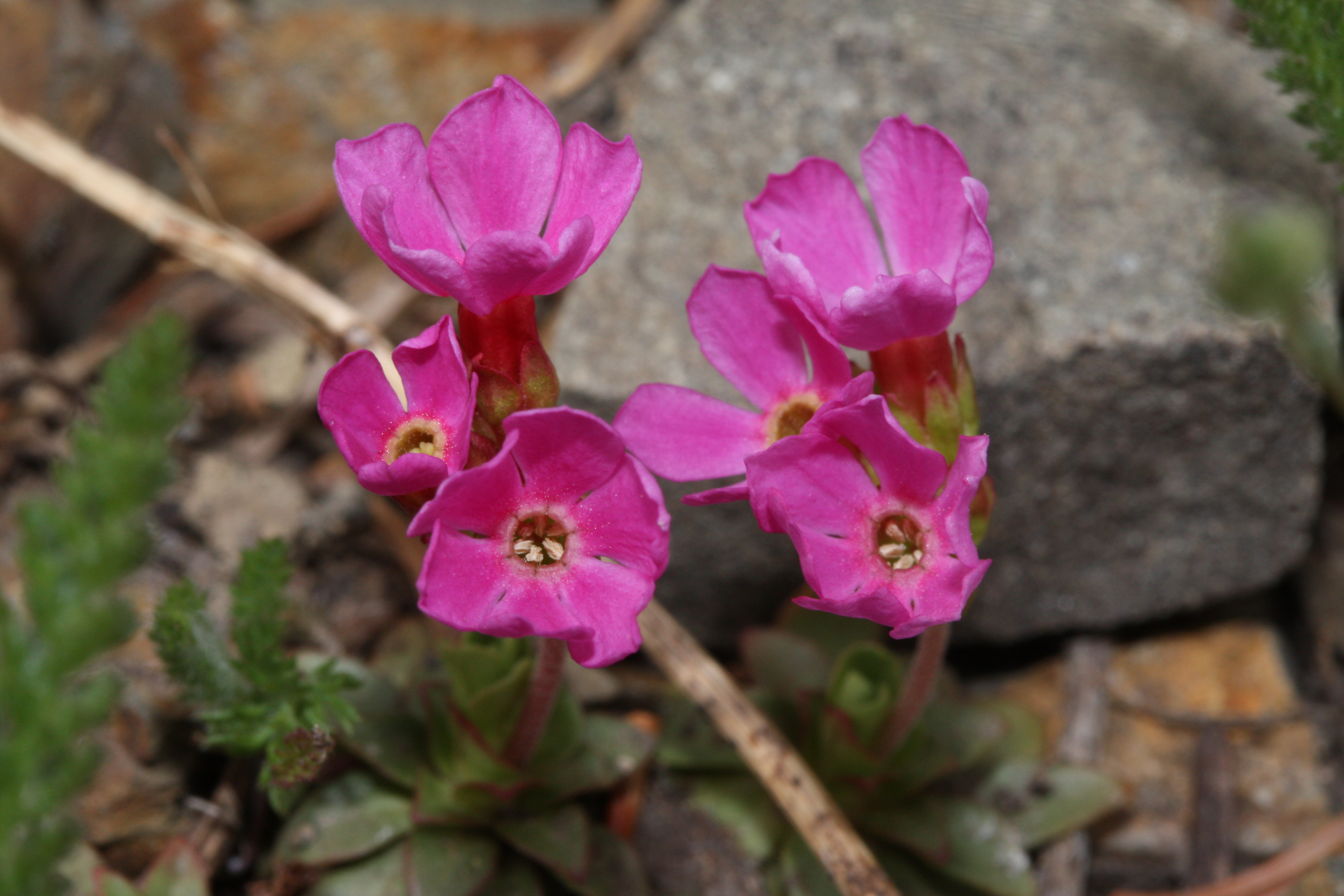
Flowers

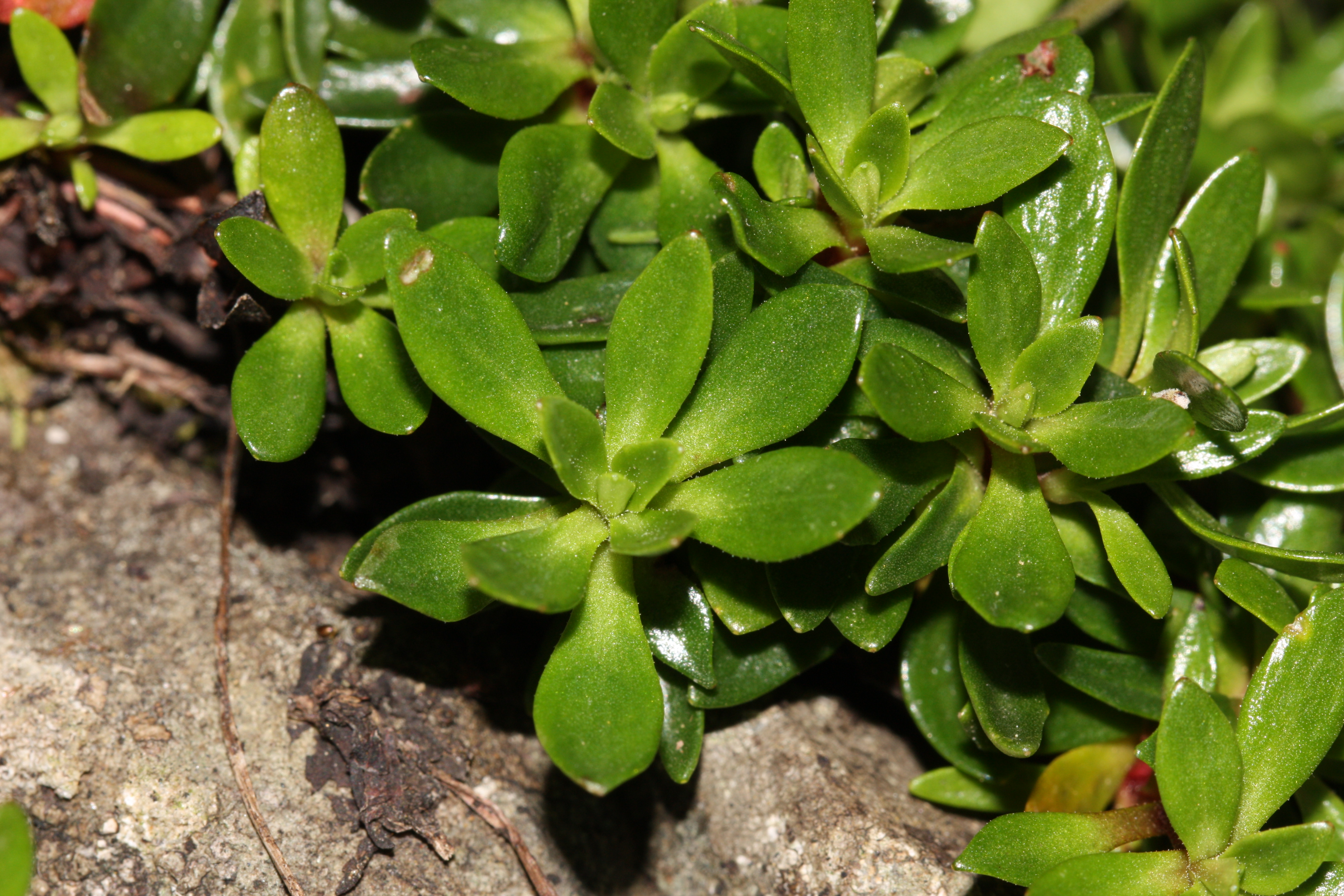
Leaves
