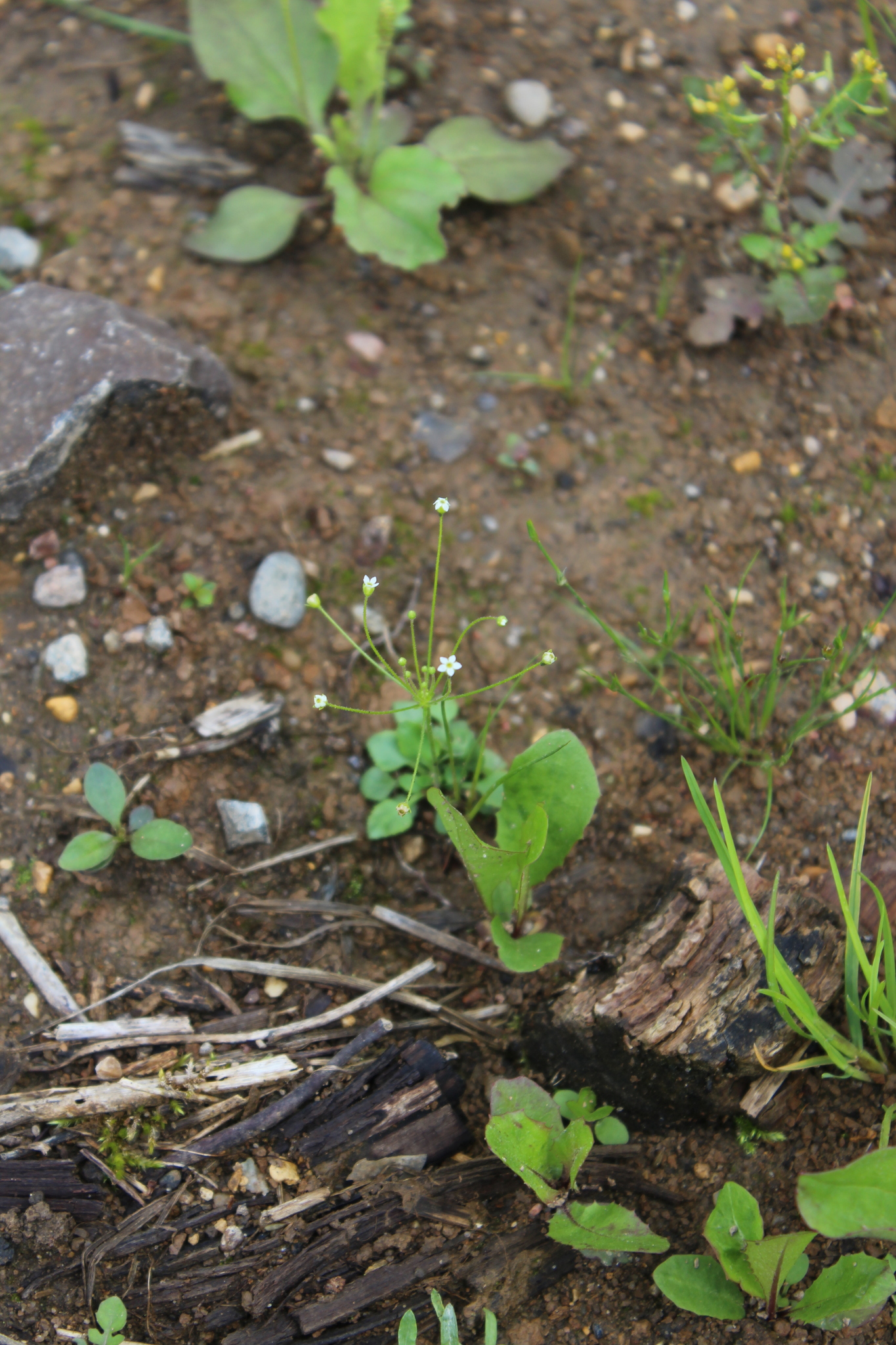

Scientific classification
- Kingdom: Plantae
- Clade: Tracheophytes
- Clade: Angiosperms
- Clade: Eudicots
- Clade: Asterids
- Order: Ericales
- Family: Primulaceae
- Genus: Androsace
- Species: A. filiformis

Binomial name
- Androsace filiformis Retz.

= Androsace filiformis =

Species of flowering plant

Androsace filiformis is a species of flowering plant in the primrose family known by the common names filiform rockjasmine and slender-stemmed androsace.

It is an uncommon plant native to the Northwestern United States, California, Colorado, and Utah. It is also known from Eurasia.

It grows in mountain meadows, including in the Cascade Range and Rocky Mountains.

== Description ==
Androsace filiformis is a small annual herb forming hairy to hairless patches up to 12 centimeters tall. The basal rosette contains finely toothed leaves up to 2 centimeters long, often much smaller, and oval to nearly triangular in shape.

There are generally several open umbels of tiny five-lobed white flowers on long pedicels.
