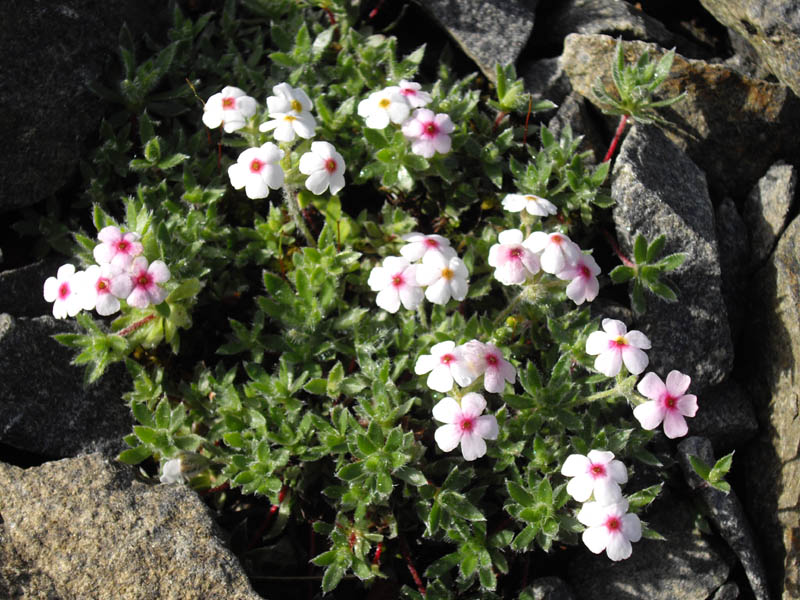

Scientific classification
- Kingdom: Plantae
- Clade: Tracheophytes
- Clade: Angiosperms
- Clade: Eudicots
- Clade: Asterids
- Order: Ericales
- Family: Primulaceae
- Genus: Androsace
- Species: A. villosa

Binomial name
- Androsace villosa L.

Synonyms
- Androsace penicillata Schott, Nyman & Kotschy; Androsace taurica Ovcz.

= Androsace villosa =

Species of flowering plant

Androsace villosa is an alpine plant, widespread in the mountains of Europe and Asia. It is frequently grown by alpine gardeners.

== Description ==
A. villosa is very variable. The typical form grown in gardens is a small tufted or mat-forming perennial, with rosettes of linear to elliptical leaves, up to 1.5 cm across. The leaves have fine hairs underneath, particularly towards the tips. The flowers, which are 6–10 mm in diameter, are in umbels on stems up to 3 cm tall. They vary in colour from white to red-purple, with a pink or yellow eye. The white forms may age to pink.

== Distribution ==
In the wild, A. villosa grows on limestone mountains in Europe and Asia, usually on rocky slopes above 1500 m.

== Cultivation ==
Androsace villosa is widely grown in rock gardens. A number of forms are in cultivation:

- A. villosa var. arachnoidea has a compact habit and more woolly rosettes.
- A. villosa var. taurica (syn. A. taurica) has pink flowers with a red eye.
- A. villosa var. jacquemontii, from the Himalaya above 3500 m, is stoloniferous, spreading to form large mats. The leaves are more densely hairy; the flowers are red-purple with a greenish-yellow eye. It is sensitive to winter wet.

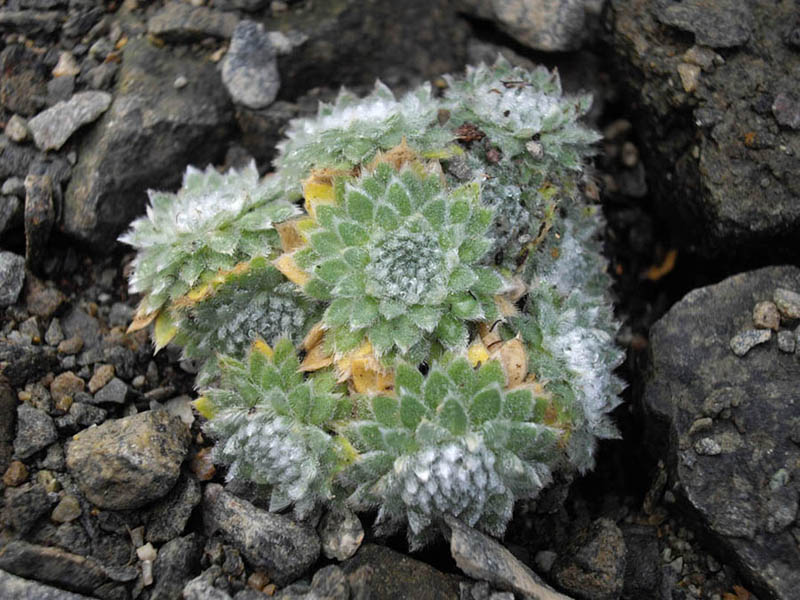
Androsace villosa var. jacquemontii
