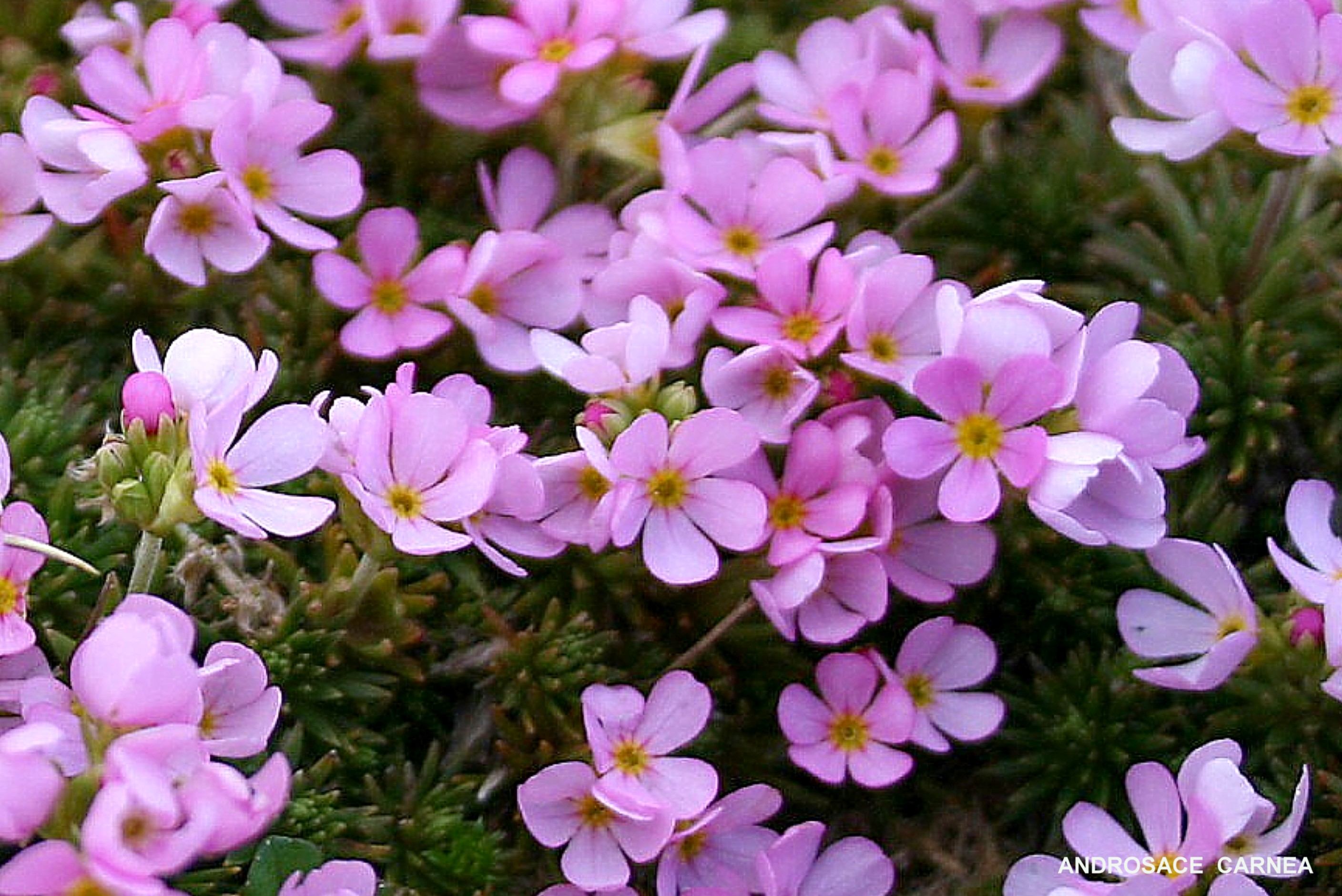
- In bloom
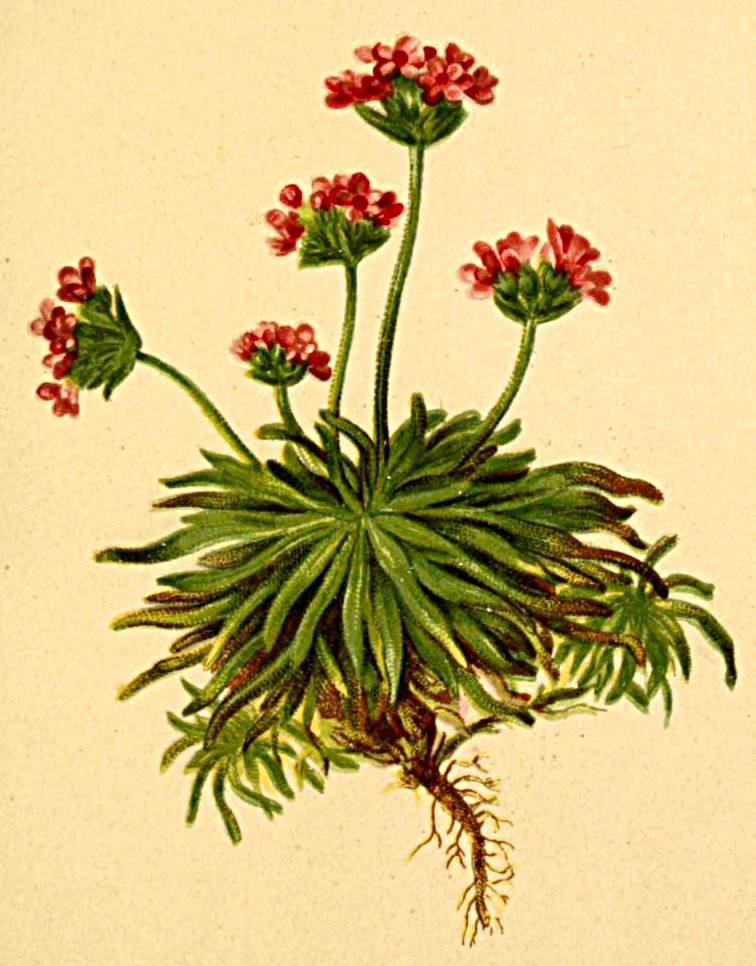
- Botanical illustration

Scientific classification
- Kingdom: Plantae
- Clade: Tracheophytes
- Clade: Angiosperms
- Clade: Eudicots
- Clade: Asterids
- Order: Ericales
- Family: Primulaceae
- Genus: Androsace
- Species: A. laggeri

Binomial name
- Androsace laggeri A.Huet

Synonyms
- Androsace carnea L.; Aretia carnea (L.) Bubani; Primula carnea (L.) Kuntze; Primula laggeri (A.Huet) Voss

= Androsace laggeri =

Species of flowering plant

Androsace laggeri (syn. Androsace carnea), the pink rock jasmine, is a species of flowering plant in the family Primulaceae, native to the central Pyrenees. As Androsace carnea subsp. laggeri it has gained the Royal Horticultural Society's Award of Garden Merit.
