= Johannes Hegetschweiler =

Swiss physician and botanist (1789–1839)

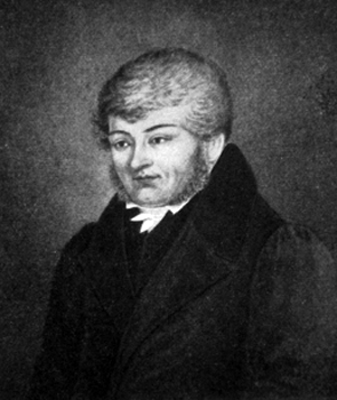
Johannes Hegetschweiler

Johannes Hegetschweiler (4 December 1789, Rifferswil – 9 September 1839, Zürich) was a Swiss medical doctor and botanist. He is remembered for his investigations of Alpine vegetation.

== Biography ==
In 1809 he studied medicine at the medical-surgical institute in Zürich, followed by medical studies at the University of Tübingen as a pupil of Johann Heinrich Ferdinand von Autenrieth. While at Tübingen, he also attended lectures in natural sciences given by Carl Friedrich Kielmeyer. Later on, he worked as a physician at the typhus hospital in Rheinau, and from 1814 to 1831, he served as a doctor in the town of Stafa.

From 1831 to 1839 he served as a member of the cantonal government (Regierungsrat) in Zürich, where he was president of the cantonal health council (Gesundheitsrat) and the medical section (Medizinal-Sektion).

In the 1830s, under his leadership, the cantonal health system was significantly modernized. This included new medical legislation, the creation of the cantonal hospital (Kantonsspital) and cantonal pharmacy (Kantonsapotheke), the establishment of the medical faculty at the University of Zürich, and the reorganization of the veterinary school (Tierarzneischule).

During the so-called Züriputsch of September 6, 1839, as a mediator between government militia and insurrectionists, he was wounded in the head from a bullet fired by the insurgents, and died three days later on September 9. The botanical genus Hegetschweilera Heer, Regel (1842) commemorates his name, as does taxa with the specific epithet of hegetschweileri.

== Published works ==
Among his better written efforts was an enumeration of Swiss plants, titled Beyträge zur einer kritischent aufzählung der Schweizer pflanzen (1831), and a new edition of Johann Rudolf Suter's Flora Helvetica (1822). After his death, Oswald Heer edited and published Hegetschweiler's Flora der Schweiz (1840).
