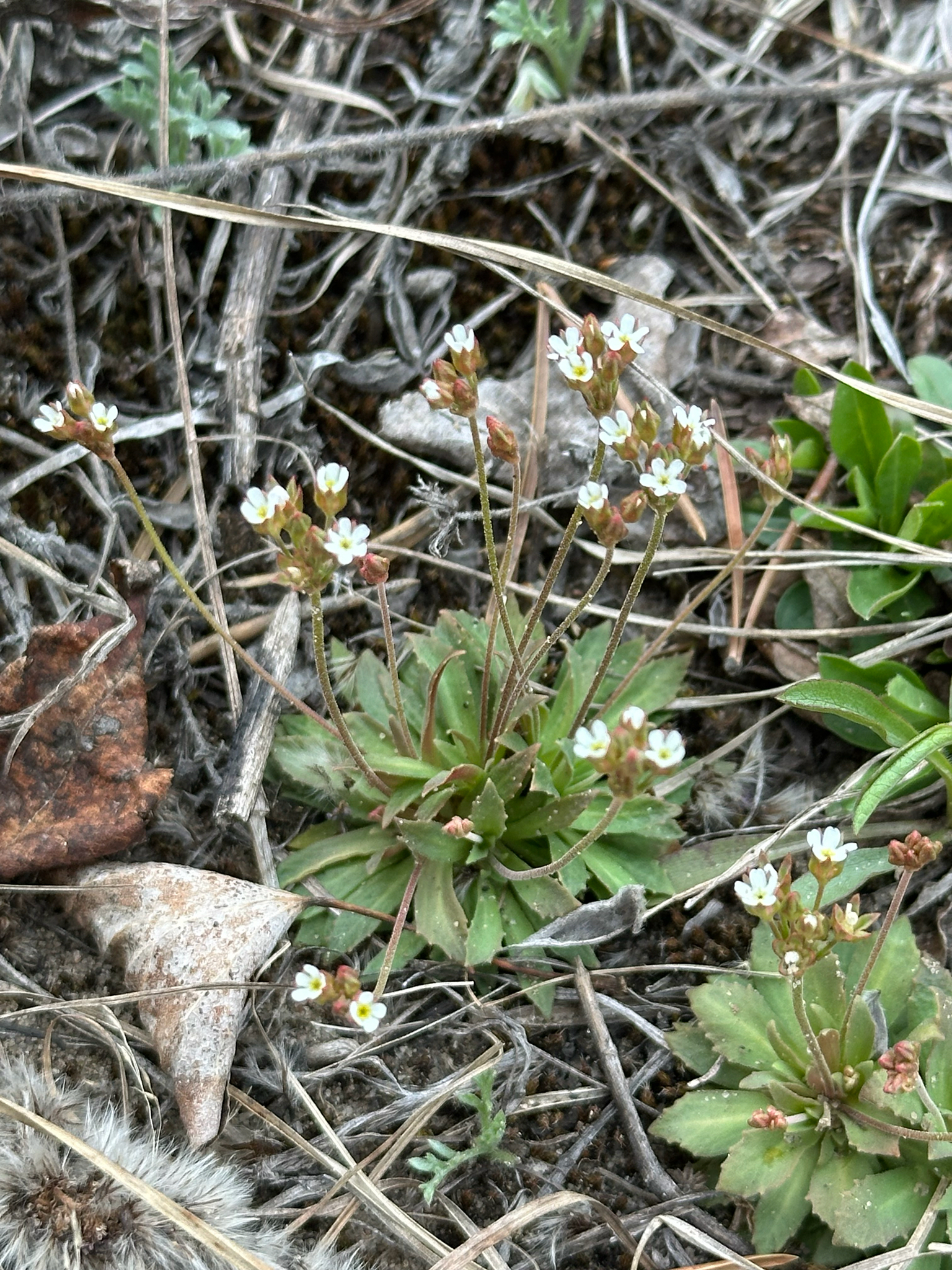
- Blooming near Redwater Provincial Recreation Area, Alberta, Canada

Conservation status
- Secure (NatureServe)

Scientific classification
- Kingdom: Plantae
- Clade: Tracheophytes
- Clade: Angiosperms
- Clade: Eudicots
- Clade: Asterids
- Order: Ericales
- Family: Primulaceae
- Genus: Androsace
- Species: A. septentrionalis

Binomial name
- Androsace septentrionalis L.

Synonyms
- List: Amadea diffusa; Amadea puberulenta; Androsace acaulis; Androsace arguta; Androsace diffusa; Androsace elongata; Androsace glandulosa; Androsace gormanii; Androsace lactea; Androsace lactiflora; Androsace linearis; Androsace multiflora; Androsace pinetorum; Androsace puberulenta; Androsace subulifera; Androsace subumbellata; Primula pinetorum; Primula septentrionalis

= Androsace septentrionalis =

Plant species in the primrose family

Androsace septentrionalis, also known as pygmy-flower rock-jasmine, is a species of small plant that grows in disturbed areas and open ground in the northern hemisphere. It is widespread in Europe, Asia, and North America from Arctic areas to as far south as northern Mexico, India, and Pakistan. The species quite variable in the size of its flowering stems, but has just one rosette of leaves. Each plant will live for one or two years and die after flowering.

== Description ==
Androsace septentrionalis is a highly variable plant from hardly noticeable to substantial in size, but does not form a mat. Plants can be annuals or biennials with all their basal leaves in a single rosette. The leaves are attached by a very short petiole or directly without a leaf stem. They measure 5 to 35 millimeters long with a width of 3 to 10 mm and can be hairless or hairy, but usually ciliate, fringed with hairs along the leaf edge. Leaves have a oblanceolate to spatulate shape; like a reversed spear head or a spoon shape.

Plants usually have one to five scapes, leafless floral stems, but can occasionally have as many as 10. They typically measure 1 to 10 centimeters long, but will sometime reach 30 cm. Each inflorescence has as few as five or as many as 30 flowers. The flowers are small, measuring just 4–6 mm across, and with white or pink petals.

The fruit is a capsule measuring 3 to 5 mm. Inside there are numerous seeds each 0.5 to 1 mm.

== Taxonomy ==
Androsace septentrionalis was given its scientific name by Carl Linnaeus in 1753. It is classified as part of the genus Androsace in the family Primulaceae. It has no accepted subspecies or varieties according to Plants of the World Online, but has 37 synonyms.

Table of Synonyms
Name	Year	Rank	Notes
Amadea diffusa (Small) Lunell	1916	species	= het.
Amadea puberulenta (Rydb.) Lunell	1916	species	= het.
Androsace acaulis Duby	1844	species	= het.
Androsace arguta Greene	1900	species	= het.
Androsace diffusa Small	1898	species	= het.
Androsace elongata Richardson	1823	species	= het., nom. illeg.
Androsace glandulosa Wooton & Standl.	1907	species	= het.
Androsace gormanii Greene	1900	species	= het.
Androsace lactea Pall.	1773	species	= het., nom. illeg.
Androsace lactiflora Kar. & Kir.	1841	species	= het., nom. illeg.
Androsace linearis Graham	1829	species	= het.
Androsace multiflora Lam.	1779	species	≡ hom., nom. superfl.
Androsace pinetorum Greene	1900	species	= het.
Androsace puberulenta Rydb.	1903	species	= het.
Androsace septentrionalis var. diffusa (Small) R.Knuth	1905	variety	= het.
Androsace septentrionalis f. exscapa Wahlenb.	1824	form	= het.
Androsace septentrionalis var. glandulosa (Wooton & Standl.) H.St.John	1922	variety	= het.
Androsace septentrionalis subsp. glandulosa (Wooton & Standl.) G.T.Robbins	1944	subspecies	= het.
Androsace septentrionalis var. gormannii Ostenf.	1909	variety	= het.
Androsace septentrionalis f. latifolia Y.H.Huang	1981	form	= het.
Androsace septentrionalis var. pinetorum (Greene) R.Knuth	1905	variety	= het.
Androsace septentrionalis var. puberulenta (Rydb.) R.Knuth	1905	variety	= het.
Androsace septentrionalis subsp. puberulenta (Rydb.) G.T.Robbins	1944	subspecies	= het.
Androsace septentrionalis subsp. robusta (H.St.John) G.T.Robbins	1944	subspecies	= het.
Androsace septentrionalis var. robusta H.St.John	1922	variety	= het.
Androsace septentrionalis var. subintegra A.Nelson ex R.Knuth	1905	variety	= het.
Androsace septentrionalis var. subulifera A.Gray	1886	variety	= het.
Androsace septentrionalis subsp. subulifera (A.Gray) G.T.Robbins	1944	subspecies	= het.
Androsace septentrionalis subsp. subumbellata (A.Nelson) G.T.Robbins	1944	subspecies	= het.
Androsace septentrionalis var. subumbellata A.Nelson	1896	variety	= het.
Androsace septentrionalis var. typica R.Knuth	1905	variety	≡ hom., not validly publ.
Androsace subulifera (A.Gray) Rydb.	1906	species	= het.
Androsace subumbellata (A.Nelson) Small	1898	species	= het.
Douglasia ochotensis subsp. gormanii (Greene) Á.Löve & D.Löve	1975	subspecies	= het.
Primula pinetorum (Greene) Derganc	1904	species	= het.
Primula septentrionalis (L.) Kuntze	1891	species	≡ hom.
Primula septentrionalis var. subulifera (A.Gray) Derganc	1904	variety	= het.
Notes: ≡ homotypic synonym; = heterotypic synonym

=== Names ===
Androsace septentrionalis is known by several common names including pygmy-flower rock-jasmine, pygmyflower rockjasmine, rock jasmine, northern rockjasmine, pygmyflower, and northern fairy candelabra.

== Range and habitat ==
Androsace septentrionalis is a very widely distributed species that is native to North America, Europe, and temperate Asia. In Europe it is native as far west as France, but is not found in the Low Countries or the British Isles. In Central Europe it grows widely, but is not found in Hungary. To the south it is also found in Italy and Romania. To the north it is part of the flora of Denmark and the Scandinavian Peninsula and Finland. It grows in every part of Eastern Europe except for on the Crimean Peninsula. It reaches as far south as Georgia and neighboring Armenia.

In western Asia it is somewhat wide spread growing in western Siberia, Altai Krai, and Yakutia, as well as to 72° N in the Novaya Zemlya archipelago. In Central Asia it is native to Kazakhstan, Kyrgyzstan, Uzbekistan, and even Tajikistan. Southwards it crosses over into northern Pakistan and the northwestern part of India in the Western Himalayas. In China it grows in the northern provinces of Xinjiang, Inner Mongolia, and Hebei as well as the country of Mongolia. At the eastern side of Asia it grows throughout the Russian Far East and also in Korea.

The North American population of the species is native to all the far north from Alaska to Greenland. It grows throughout Canada as far east as Quebec and formerly grew in Newfoundland but is locally extinct there. In the contiguous United States found in the western states from the Pacific to as far east as Minnesota and Texas, but not in the central or southern states of the Great Plains. In Mexico it is native to just three northern states, Nuevo León, Coahuila, and Sonora.

Androsace septentrionalis is found in open areas, especially sandy, gravelly, or disturbed ground. It grows in the tundra, forests, grasslands, and shrublands.
