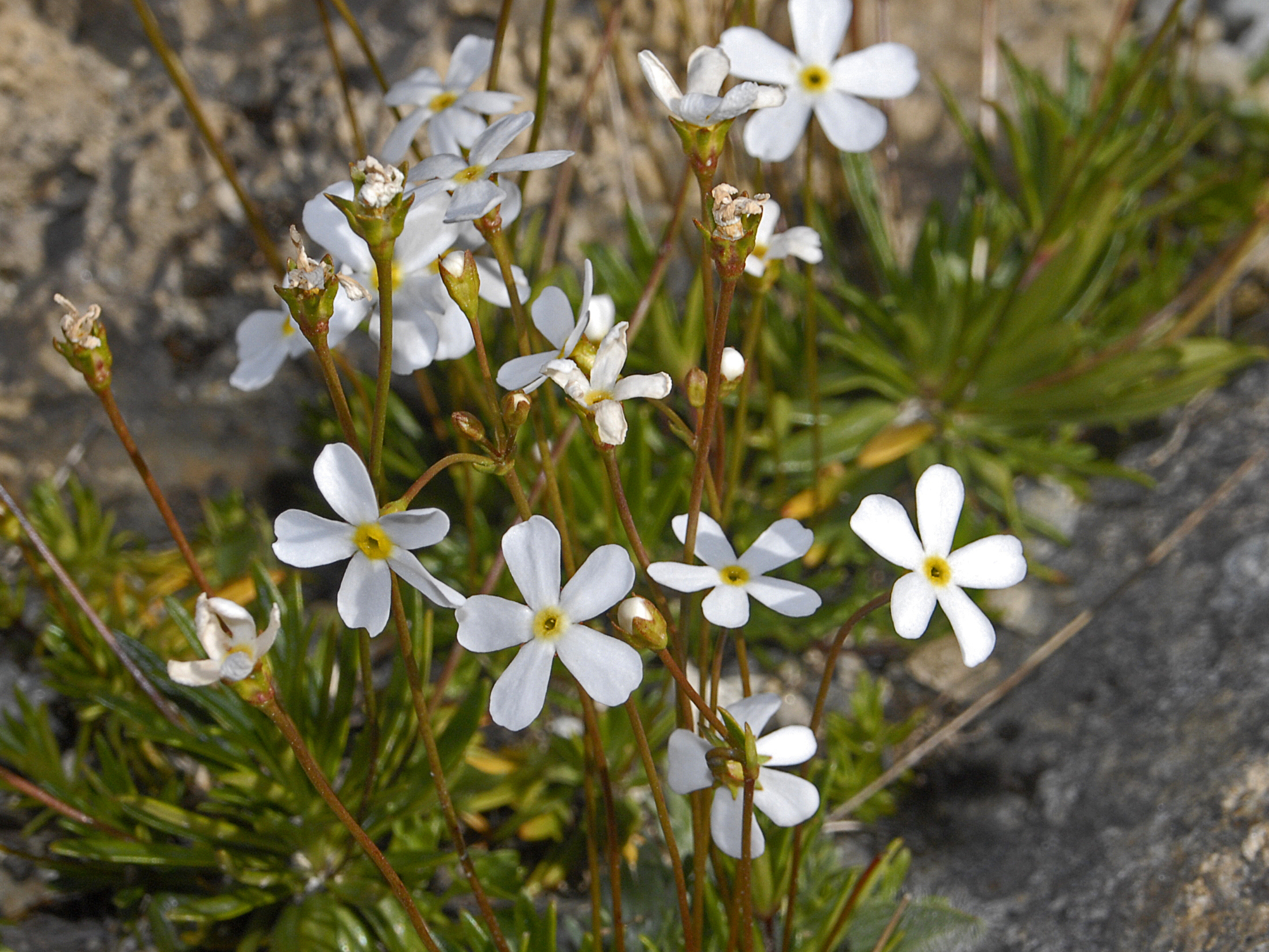
- Androsace lactea at the Giardino Botanico Alpino Chanousia

Scientific classification
- Kingdom: Plantae
- Clade: Tracheophytes
- Clade: Angiosperms
- Clade: Eudicots
- Clade: Asterids
- Order: Ericales
- Family: Primulaceae
- Genus: Androsace
- Species: A. lactea

Binomial name
- Androsace lactea L.

Synonyms
- Androsace pauciflora Vill.

= Androsace lactea =

Species of flowering plant

Androsace lactea, the milkwhite rock jasmine, is an alpine plant, in the family Primulaceae.

== Description ==
Androsace lactea can reach a height of 5–10 centimetres (2.0–3.9 in). This plant produces rosettes of leaves with a diameter of about 2–4 centimetres (0.79–1.57 in). The leaves are shining dark green, linear or lightly elliptic. Flowers are white with a yellow centre, 10–12 millimetres (0.39–0.47 in) in diameter, with broadly notched petals. They bloom from May to August.

== Distribution ==
Androsace lactea is endemic to the Alps and Carpathians.

== Habitat ==
This plant prefers limestone rocks, screes and meadows, at an elevation of 500–3,100 metres (1,600–10,200 ft) above sea level.
