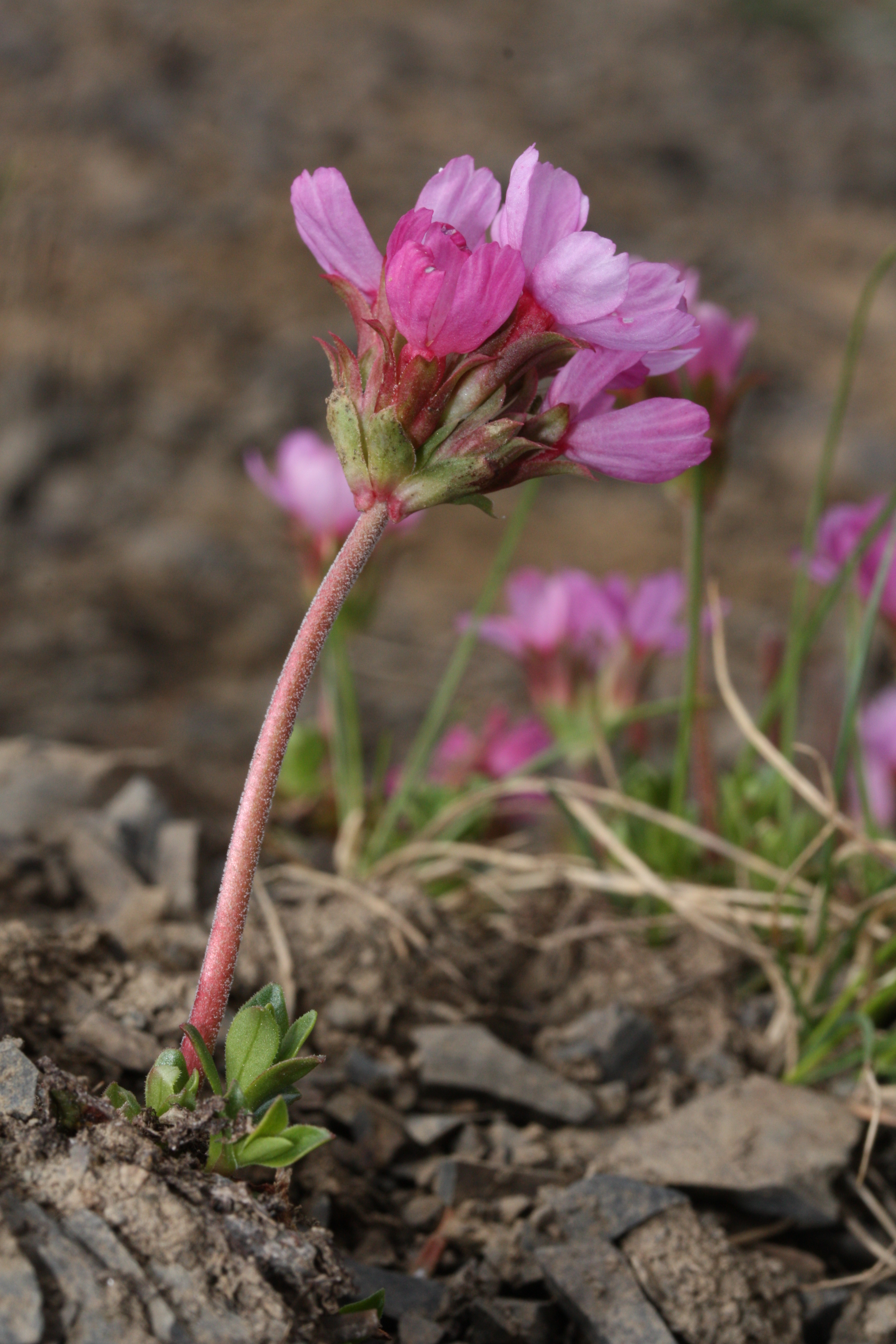
- Androsace laevigata in Olympic National Park, United States

Scientific classification
- Kingdom: Plantae
- Clade: Tracheophytes
- Clade: Angiosperms
- Clade: Eudicots
- Clade: Asterids
- Order: Ericales
- Family: Primulaceae
- Subfamily: Primuloideae
- Genus: Androsace; L.

Sections
- Androsace; Aretia Subsection Aretia Subsection Dicranothrix Chamaejasme; Elongatae; Filiformes; Megista; Mirabiles; Orthocaulon; Pomatosace; Samuelia

Synonyms
- Amadea Adans. Aretia Haller ex L. Douglasia Lindl. Drosace A.Nelson; Pomatosace Maxim. Vitaliana Sesl.

= Androsace =

Genus of flowering plants

Androsace, commonly known as rock jasmine, is a genus of flowering plants in the family Primulaceae, second only to Primula in the number of species. It comprises about 120 to 170 species, distributed across temperate to arctic–alpine regions of Eurasia, North America, and northern Africa. The Tibetan Plateau, the Himalayas, and the Hengduan Mountains (with roughly 73 species in China) are the main diversity center, as well as secondary centers of diversity in the Alps and Pyrenees.

Species of Androsace range from small annuals and biennials of steppes, grasslands, and woodlands to long-lived perennial mats and compact cushion plants of high-mountain environments, occurring up to 6,350 m (20,830 ft). Most species form basal rosettes of small entire, toothed, or lobed leaves and bear five-merous white, pink, purple, red, or occasionally yellow flowers with short corolla tubes and constricted throats. Several cushion-forming species are widely cultivated as rock garden plants.

== Description ==
=== Vegetative morphology ===
Androsace species are annual, biennial, or perennial herbaceous plants that are mostly acaulescent (lacking an elongated leafy stem), rarely producing ascending, decumbent, or erect stems (as in Androsace erecta). Leaves usually form basal rosettes that are either solitary (typical of short-lived species) or clustered into lax mats or dense, domed cushions composed of tightly superimposed rosettes on branching caudices. Leaf morphology varies strongly with habitat and life form: forest-dwelling perennials generally possess long petioles and broad, cordate, crenate or palmately lobed leaves with fibrous root systems, whereas alpine mat- and cushion-forming species typically have sessile, entire leaves and a well-developed taproot. Many Asian alpine species also exhibit pronounced heterophylly, in which smaller, densely hairy or protective outer leaves surround larger, photosynthetically active inner leaves. Leaf, scape, and calyx indumentum varies from glabrous to pubescent, villous, hirsute, sericeous, or glandular, with simple, forked, or stellate hairs.

=== Flowers, fruits, and pollen ===
Inflorescences are typically umbels borne on leafless scapes subtended by involucral bracts, or solitary flowers in some cushion species. Flowers are five-merous and homostylous, except in Androsace vitaliana, which has yellow heterostylous flowers with extended corolla tubes. Corollas are white, pink, purple, red, or yellow, with a short tube usually equal to or shorter than the calyx and a constricted, annulate throat (corona-like ring) that distinguishes Androsace from Primula, alongside shield-shaped anthers. In sect. Chamaejasme, sect. Orthocaulon, A. brevis, A. graceae, and A. filicula, the corolla throat shifts colour from yellow to red, pink, or purple during anthesis. The fruit is a subglobose, five-valved dehiscent capsule, except in Androsace filicula, whose capsule is circumscissile. Androsace species share the "Androsace-type" pollen grain: radially symmetric, isopolar, and tricolporate with prominent apertures.

== Taxonomy ==
Carl Linnaeus formally described the genera Androsace and Aretia in Species Plantarum. Aretia was later lumped into Androsace by Lamarck. Three small satellite genera, Douglasia, Vitaliana, and Pomatosace, were considered distinct from Androsace. Nevertheless, molecular phylogenetic studies revealed that all three genera are nested within Androsace.

Phylogenomic analyses consistently divide Androsace into two major sister lineages:

- The Central Asian clade or "chamaejasmids", which includes the Asian alpine cushion and heterophyllous species and forest and steppe species (sect. Chamaejasme, Orthocaulon, Filiformes, Samuelia and Megista).
- The European–North American clade or "aretids", which includes the European and North American alpine species (sect. Aretia, containing former Douglasia and Vitaliana) along with two predominantly temperate short-lived clades (sect. Elongatae and Androsace) and an early-diverging East Asian lineage comprising sect. Mirabiles and Pomatosace.

Some cytonuclear discordance has been observed in phylogenies, for example, in sect. Aretia, nrDNA recovers subsections Aretia and Dicranothrix as sister clades, whereas plastomes nest subsect. Dicranothrix within subsect. Aretia. Several closely related species complexes (such as the A. tapete, A. yargongensis, A. halleri, and A. helvetica groups) also show non-monophyly in plastome or nrDNA trees, likely reflecting incomplete lineage sorting, hybridization, chloroplast capture, or taxonomic over-splitting.

=== Sections ===
Traditional sectional classifications of Androsace relied on phenotypes like life form, leaf shape, and inflorescence characters to recognize up to nine sections (Aizoidium, Androsace/Andraspis, Aretia, Chamaejasme, Douglasia, Mirabiles, Orthocaulon, Samuelia/Pseudoprimula, and Vitaliana). Molecular phylogenies showed that the short-lived sect. Androsace was highly polyphyletic, having evolved independently across multiple clades, while sect. Aretia and sect. Chamaejasme were paraphyletic due to the nested Douglasia/Vitaliana and sect. Aizoidium, respectively.

According to a revised classification of the infrageneric taxonomy published in 2026, Androsace is divided into ten monophyletic sections:

- Androsace sect. Androsace, including A. septentrionalis, A. lactiflora, and eight Caucasus relatives.
- Androsace sect. Aretia (L.) W.D.J.Koch: ~37 species, including former Douglasia and Vitaliana, perennial mat- or cushion-forming herbs (rarely annual) of Europe, North Asia, and western North America.
- Androsace sect. Chamaejasme W.D.J.Koch: ~78 species, including the former sect. Aizoidium; mostly perennial mats or cushions (rarely biennial) of Asia, Europe, and western North America.
- Androsace sect. Elongatae Heng C.Wang & Jiao Sun: Two annual species (A. elongata and A. occidentalis) from Eurasia and North America.
- Androsace sect. Filiformes Kuvaev & Pirozhk.: Monotypic section for A. filiformis, a widespread Eurasian and western North American species.
- Androsace sect. Megista Schltdl.: Monotypic section for the widespread Eurasian and North African species A. maxima.
- Androsace sect. Mirabiles (Hand.-Mazz.) Y.C.Yang & R.F.Huang: This section includes 3 species restricted to central and southwestern China (A. mirabilis, A. runcinata, and traditionally A. graceae. However, a 2026 plastome and palynological study proposed transferring A. graceae to sect. Samuelia).
- Androsace sect. Orthocaulon Hand.-Mazz.: Monotypic section for A. erecta of western China and Nepal.
- Androsace sect. Pomatosace (Maxim.) Heng C.Wang & Jiao Sun: Monotypic section for A. filicula of the eastern Tibetan Plateau, distinguished by pinnatifid basal leaves and circumscissile capsules, traditionally classified as a distinct genus.
- Androsace sect. Samuelia Schltdl.: Perennial, rarely annual or biennial, forest and streamside herbs of East, South, and Southeast Asia.

=== Species ===
As of November 2026, Plants of the World Online recognizes the following 166 species, including those formerly placed in Douglasia and Vitaliana.

- Androsace adenocephala Hand.-Mazz.
- Androsace adfinis Biroli
- Androsace aflatunensis Ovcz.
- Androsace aizoon Duby
- Androsace akbaitalensis Derganc ex O.Fedtsch.
- Androsace alaica Ovcz. & S.B.Astan.
- Androsace alaschanica Maxim.
- Androsace alaskana Coville & Standl. ex Hultén
- Androsace albana Steven
- Androsace alchemilloides Franch.
- Androsace alpina (L.) Lam.
- Androsace americana Wendelbo
- Androsace apus Franch. ex R.Knuth
- Androsace × aretioides (Gaudin) Hegetschw.
- Androsace argentea (C.F.Gaertn.) Lapeyr.
- Androsace armeniaca Duby
- Androsace axillaris (Franch.) Franch.
- Androsace baltistanica Y.J.Nasir
- Androsace beringensis (S.Kelso, Jurtzev & D.F.Murray) Cubey
- Androsace bidentata K.Koch
- Androsace bisulca Bureau & Franch.
- Androsace brachystegia Hand.-Mazz.
- Androsace brevis (Hegetschw.) Ces.
- Androsace bryomorpha Lipsky
- Androsace bulleyana Forrest
- Androsace bungeana Schischk. & Bobrov
- Androsace caduca Ovcz.
- Androsace caespitosa Lehm. ex Spreng.
- Androsace cernuiflora Y.C.Yang & R.F.Huang
- Androsace chaixii Gren. & Godr.
- Androsace chamaejasme Wulfen
- Androsace ciliata DC.
- Androsace ciliifolia Ludlow
- Androsace constancei Wendelbo
- Androsace coronata (Watt) Hand.-Mazz.
- Androsace cortusifolia Nakai
- Androsace croftii Watt
- Androsace cuscutiformis Franch.
- Androsace cuttingii C.E.C.Fisch.
- Androsace cylindrica DC.
- Androsace darvasica Ovcz.
- Androsace dasyphylla Bunge
- Androsace delavayi Franch.
- Androsace dielsiana R.Knuth
- Androsace dissecta (Franch.) Franch.
- Androsace diversifolia C.Y.Wu
- Androsace duthieana R.Knuth
- Androsace elatior Pax & K.Hoffm.
- Androsace elongata L.
- Androsace engleri R.Knuth
- Androsace erecta Maxim.
- Androsace eritrichioides Gand.
- Androsace × escheri Brügger
- Androsace euryantha Hand.-Mazz.
- Androsace exscapa Maximova
- Androsace fedtschenkoi Ovcz.
- Androsace filiformis Retz.
- Androsace flavescens Maxim.
- Androsace foliosa Duby
- Androsace forrestiana Hand.-Mazz.
- Androsace gagnepainiana Hand.-Mazz.
- Androsace geraniifolia Watt
- Androsace globifera Duby
- Androsace globiferoides (Kunth) Hand.-Mazz.
- Androsace gmelinii (L.) Roem. & Schult.
- Androsace gorodkovii Ovcz. & Karav.
- Androsace graceae Forrest ex W.W.Sm.
- Androsace gracilis Hand.-Mazz.
- Androsace graminifolia C.E.C.Fisch.
- Androsace halleri L.
- Androsace handel-mazzettii Kress
- Androsace harrissii Duthie
- Androsace hausmannii Leyb.
- Androsace hazarica R.R.Stewart ex Y.J.Nasir
- Androsace hedreantha Griseb.
- Androsace × heeri W.D.J.Koch
- Androsace helvetica (L.) All.
- Androsace hemisphaerica Ludlow
- Androsace henryi Oliv.
- Androsace hohxilensis R.F.Huang & S.K.Wu
- Androsace hookeriana Klatt
- Androsace hopeiensis Nakai
- Androsace × hybrida A.Kern.
- Androsace idahoensis (Douglass M.Hend.) Cubey
- Androsace incana Lam.
- Androsace integra (Maxim.) Hand.-Mazz.
- Androsace intermedia Ledeb.
- Androsace jacquemontii Duby
- Androsace khokhrjakovii Mazurenko
- Androsace khumbuensis Dentant
- Androsace komovensis Schönsw. & Schneew.
- Androsace kouytchensis Bonati
- Androsace kuczerovii Knjaz.
- Androsace kuvajevii Mazurenko
- Androsace lactea L.
- Androsace lactiflora Fisch. ex Willd.
- Androsace laevigata (A.Gray) Wendelbo
- Androsace laggeri A.Huet
- Androsace lanuginosa Wall.
- Androsace laxa C.M.Hu & Y.C.Yang
- Androsace lehmanniana Spreng.
- Androsace lehmannii Wall. ex Duby
- Androsace limprichtii Pax & K.Hoffm.
- Androsace longifolia Turcz.
- Androsace lowariensis Y.J.Nasir
- Androsace ludlowiana Hand.-Mazz.
- Androsace mairei H.Lév.
- Androsace × marpensis G.F.Sm.
- Androsace mathildae Levier
- Androsace maxima L.
- Androsace medifissa Y.L.Chen & Y.C.Yang
- Androsace minor (Hand.-Mazz.) C.M.Hu & Y.C.Yang
- Androsace mirabilis Franch.
- Androsace mollis Hand.-Mazz.
- Androsace montana (A.Gray) Wendelbo
- Androsace mucronifolia Watt
- Androsace multiscapa Duby
- Androsace muscoidea Duby
- Androsace nivalis (Lindl.) Wendelbo
- Androsace nortonii Ludlow
- Androsace obtusifolia All.
- Androsace occidentalis Pursh
- Androsace ochotensis Roem. & Schult.
- Androsace ojhorensis Y.J.Nasir
- Androsace ovalifolia Y.C.Yang
- Androsace ovczinnikovii Schischk. & Bobrov
- Androsace pavlovskii Ovcz.
- Androsace paxiana R.Knuth
- Androsace × pedemontana Rchb.
- Androsace phaeoblephara Hand.-Mazz.
- Androsace podlechii Wendelbo
- Androsace poissonii R.Knuth
- Androsace pomeiensis C.M.Hu & Y.C.Yang
- Androsace pubescens DC.
- Androsace pyrenaica Lam.
- Androsace refracta Hand.-Mazz.
- Androsace rhizomatosa Hand.-Mazz.
- Androsace rigida Hand.-Mazz.
- Androsace rioxana A.Segura
- Androsace rockii W.E.Evans
- Androsace rotundifolia Hardw.
- Androsace runcinata Hand.-Mazz.
- Androsace russellii Y.J.Nasir
- Androsace sajanensis Stepanov
- Androsace salasii Kurtz
- Androsace sarmentosa Wall.
- Androsace selago Hook.f. & Thomson ex Klatt
- Androsace sempervivoides Jacquem. ex Duby
- Androsace septentrionalis L.
- Androsace sericea Ovcz.
- Androsace sessiliflora Turrill
- Androsace similis Craib
- Androsace spinulifera (Franch.) R.Knuth
- Androsace squarrosula Maxim.
- Androsace staintonii Y.J.Nasir
- Androsace stenophylla (Petitm.) Hand.-Mazz.
- Androsace strigillosa Franch.
- Androsace sublanata Hand.-Mazz.
- Androsace sutchuenensis Franch.
- Androsace tanggulashanensis Y.C.Yang & R.F.Huang
- Androsace tapete Maxim.
- Androsace tibetica (Maxim.) R.Knuth
- Androsace tonkinensis Bonati
- Androsace tribracteata R.F.Huang
- Androsace triflora Adams
- Androsace umbellata (Lour.) Merr.
- Androsace vegae R.Knuth
- Androsace villosa L.
- Androsace vitaliana (L.) Lapeyr.
- Androsace wardii W.W.Sm.
- Androsace wilsoniana Hand.-Mazz.
- Androsace wulfeniana (Sieber ex W.D.J.Koch) Rchb.
- Androsace yargongensis Petitm.
- Androsace zambalensis (Petitm.) Hand.-Mazz.
- Androsace zayulensis Hand.-Mazz.

=== Former Douglasia, Pomatosace, and Vitaliana species ===
The traditional Douglasia, Pomatosace, and Vitaliana species are now included in Androsace:

- Douglasia arctica = Androsace americana
- Douglasia alaskana = Androsace alaskana
- Douglasia beringensis = Androsace beringensis
- Douglasia gormanii = Androsace constancei
- Douglasia idahoensis = Androsace idahoensis
- Douglasia laevigata = Androsace laevigata
- Douglasia montana = Androsace montana
- Douglasia nivalis = Androsace nivalis
- Douglasia ochotensis = Androsace ochotensis
- Pomatosace filicula = Androsace filicula
- Vitaliana primuliflora = Androsace vitaliana

=== New species described in 2021 ===
A group of scientist disentangled the morphology and ecology of Androsace genius in the French Alps and described three new species in 2021:

- Androsace vesulensis in the A. alpina group, endemic of the Mont Viso.
- Androsace saussurei and A. delphinensis in the A. pubescens group, which grow on siliceous substrate and are endemic to Mont Blanc and Central Alps respectively.

== Cultivation ==
The following species have gained the Royal Horticultural Society's Award of Garden Merit. All are mat-forming evergreen perennials.

- A. lanuginosa (woolly rock jasmine) – lilac pink
- A. sempervivoides (sempervivum-leaved rock jasmine) – mauve pink
- A. studiosorum (rock jasmine) – deep pink
