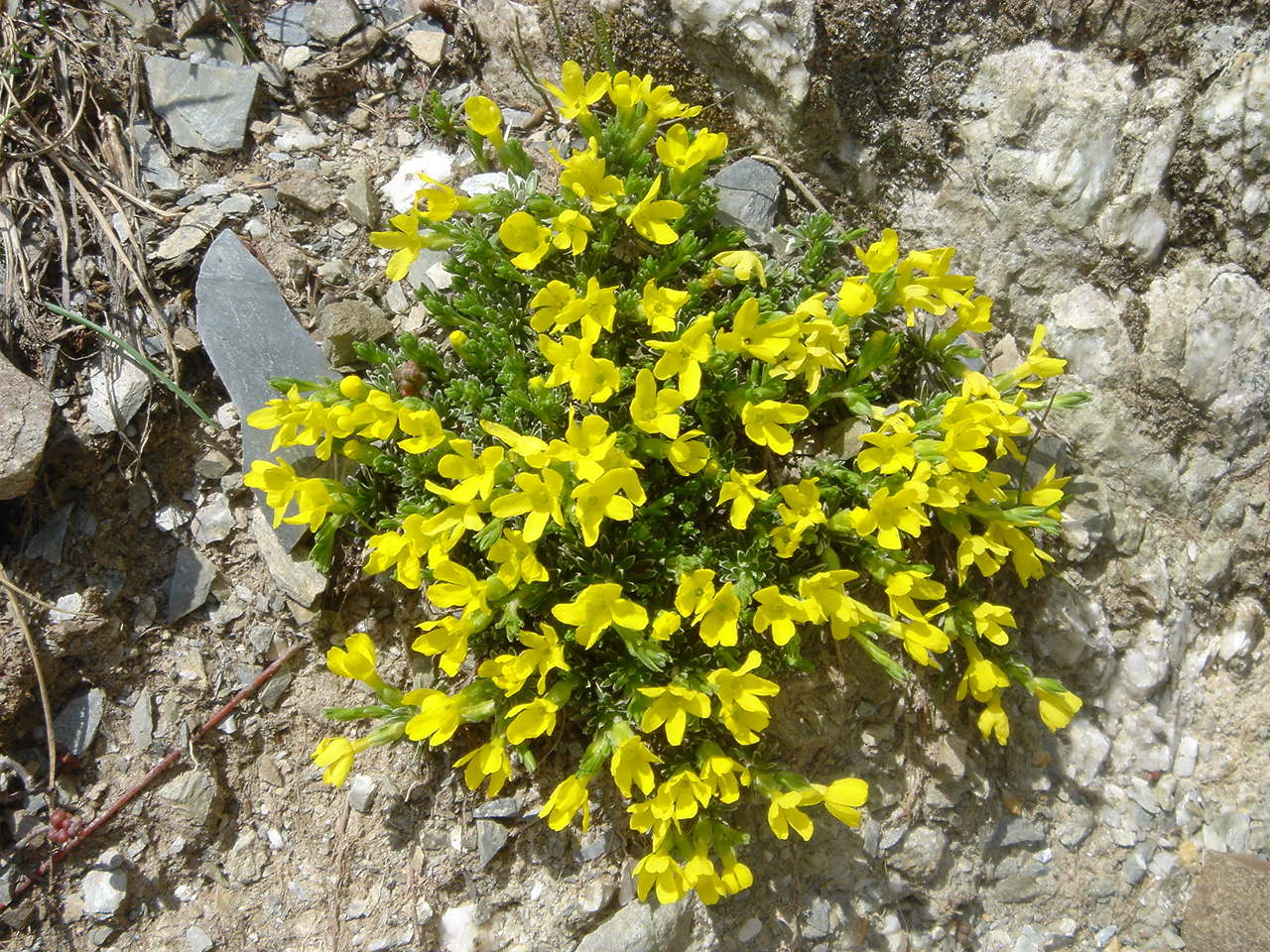
- Growing in the Pyrenees

Scientific classification
- Kingdom: Plantae
- Clade: Tracheophytes
- Clade: Angiosperms
- Clade: Eudicots
- Clade: Asterids
- Order: Ericales
- Family: Primulaceae
- Genus: Androsace
- Species: A. vitaliana

Binomial name
- Androsace vitaliana (L.) Lapeyr.

Synonyms
- Aretia vitaliana (L.) L.; Douglasia vitaliana (L.) Hook. ex Pax; Gregoria vitaliana (L.) Duby; Primula vitaliana L.; Vitaliana primuliflora Bertol.

= Androsace vitaliana =

Species of flowering plant

Androsace vitaliana is a species of plant in the primrose family, Primulaceae. It was previously known by the synonym Vitaliana primuliflora. Native to the high mountains of Europe, it is cultivated as an alpine garden plant, being considered easy to grow in well drained soil in a sunny position.

== Description ==
Androsace vitaliana is a cushion- or mat-forming plant reaching up to 15 cm (6 in) or more across. Its leaves are arranged in rosettes, each leaf being 5–10 mm (0.2–0.4 in) long and usually greyish green in colour. The flowers are usually unstalked (sessile) and are bright yellow in colour. They consist of a tube about 1–1.5 cm (0.4–0.6 in) or more long with five lobes reaching 1–2 cm (0.4–0.8 in) across when fully open. The flowers are borne singly at the ends of the leaf rosettes. Like the genus Primula, flowers are heterostylous, having pin and thrum forms.

== Taxonomy ==
The species was first described by Carl Linnaeus in 1753 as Primula vitaliana. In 1845, Antonio Bertoloni placed it as the only species in a new genus, Vitaliana, using the replacement name Vitaliana primuliflora. It has also been placed in the genus Douglasia as Douglasia vitaliana. Molecular phylogenetic studies have shown that it is embedded within Androsace.

=== Subspecies ===
Six subspecies have been identified, with distinct distributions in the high mountains of Europe:

- A. vitaliana subsp. assoana – Iberian Peninsula excluding the Pyrenees
- A. vitaliana subsp. cinerea – south-western Alps
- A. vitaliana subsp. lepontina – Pennine Alps
- A. vitaliana subsp. praetutiana – Apennines
- A. vitaliana subsp. sesleri – south-eastern Alps
- A. vitaliana subsp. vitaliana – Pyrenees
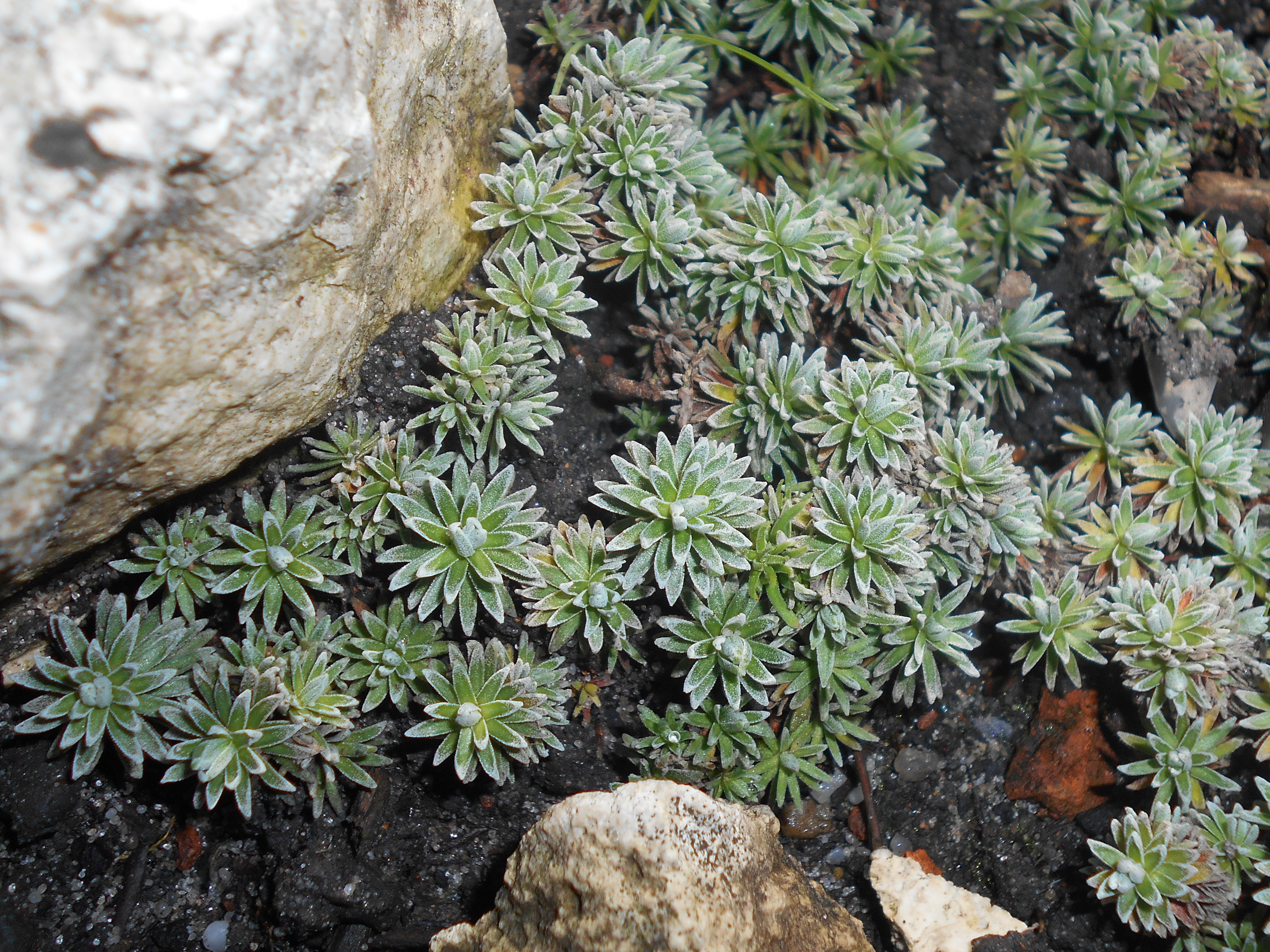
A. vitaliana subsp. praetutiana

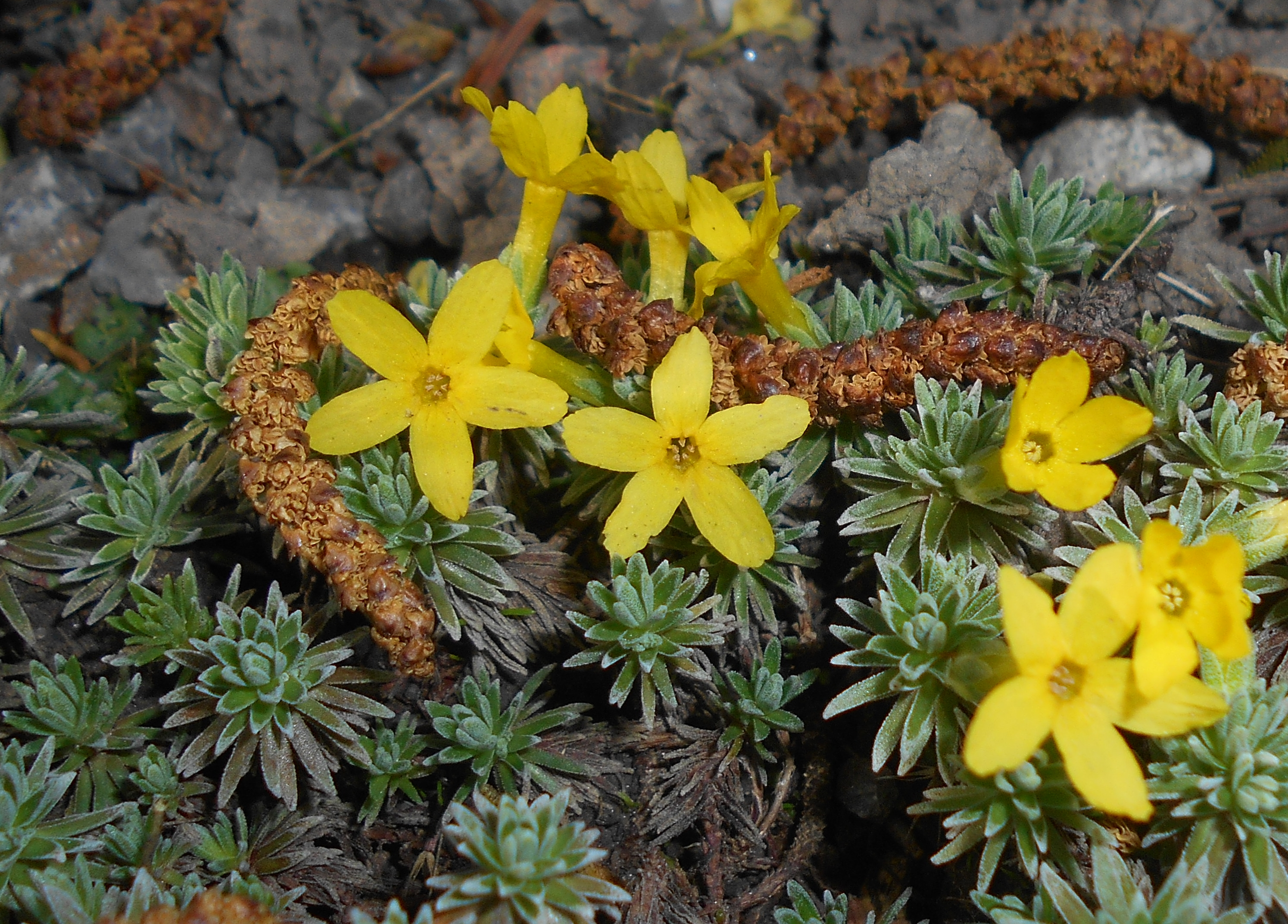
Flowers

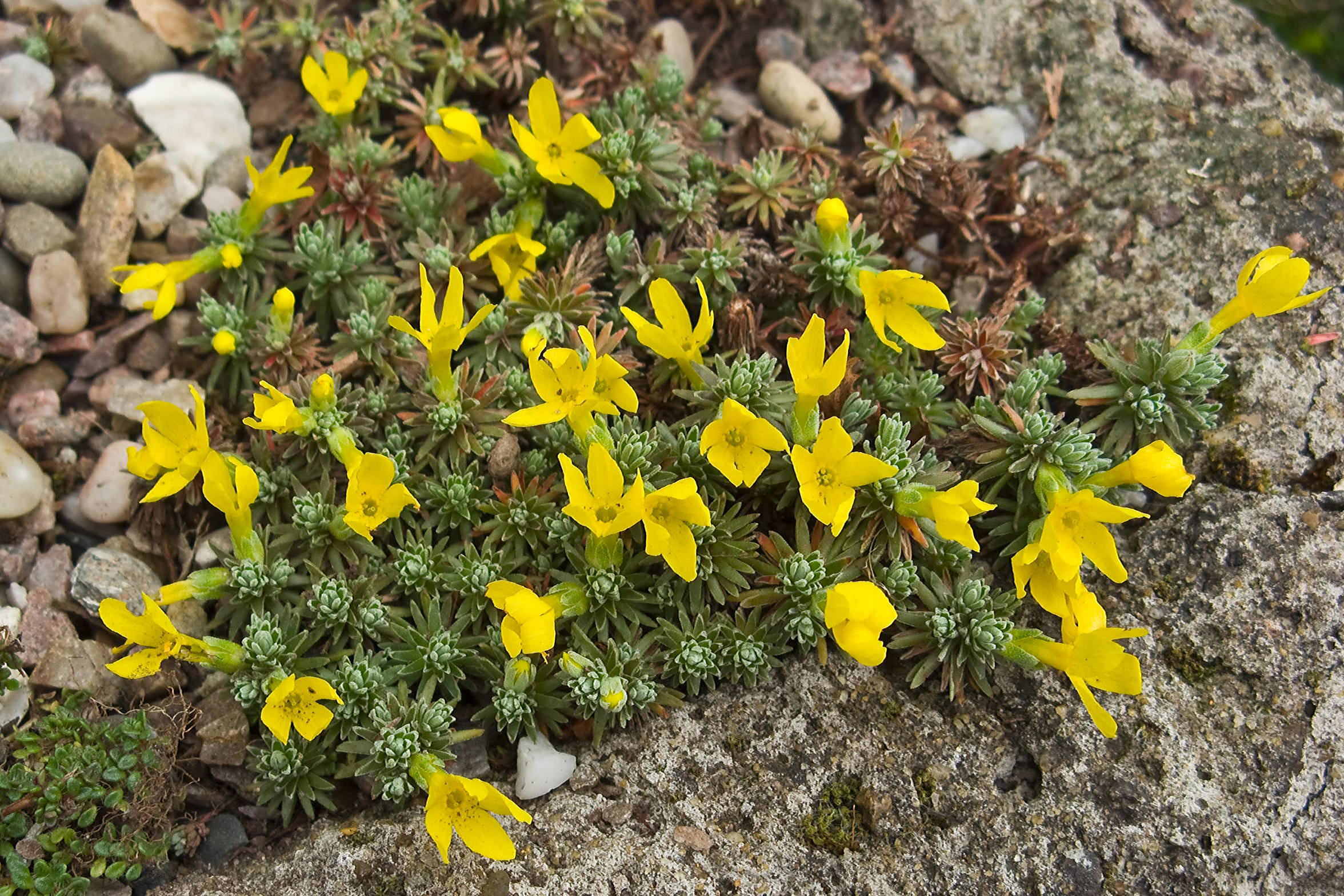
In cultivation in an alpine trough

== Distribution and habitat ==
Androsace vitaliana is native to the high mountains of Europe in Spain, France, Italy, Switzerland and a small part of Austria. It is usually found above 2,000 m (6,600 ft), on screes and rocks and in stony meadows.

== Cultivation ==
Androsace vitaliana is cultivated as an alpine garden plant. It is regarded as easy to grow in well drained but fertile soil in a sunny position. It can be propagated easily by removing rosettes with attached roots from a plant in late summer and growing them on.
