= Theophrastoideae =

- Jacquinia pungens flowers

Scientific classification
- Kingdom: Plantae
- Clade: Embryophytes
- Clade: Tracheophytes
- Clade: Angiosperms
- Clade: Eudicots
- Clade: Asterids
- Order: Ericales
- Family: Primulaceae
- Subfamily: Theophrastoideae; A.DC.

Type genus
- Theophrasta L.

Tribes
- Samoleae Reichenbach; Theophrasteae Bartling

Synonyms
- Theophrastaceae D.Don

Subfamily of flowering plants

Theophrastoideae is a small subfamily of flowering plants in the family Primulaceae. It was formerly recognized as a separate family Theophrastaceae. As previously circumscribed, the family consisted of eight genera and 95 species of trees or shrubs, native to tropical regions of the Americas.

== Description ==
The two subclades or tribes of Theophrastoideae, Theophrasteae (Theophrastaceae s.s.) and Samoleae, share only the presence of staminodes. The species of Samolus are herbaceous perennials and characterised by perigynous flowers. The remaining genera (Theophrastaceae s.s.) are generally evergreen shrubs or small trees, with hypogynous flowers.

== Taxonomy ==
=== History ===
Linnaeus, in formally describing the genera, placed Theophrasta and related genera in a group he named Pentandria Monogynia (i.e 5 stamens, one pistil), his system being based on sexual characteristics. Jussieu arranged Linnaeus' genera in a hierarchical system of ranks based on the relative value of a much wider range of characteristics. In his Genera plantarum (1789) he organised the primuloid genera into two Ordo (families), within a class (VIII) he called Dicotyledones Monopetalae Corolla Hypogyna, based on the cotyledons (two), form of the petals (fused), and position of the corolla with respect to the ovary (below). Jussieu's families were the Lysimachiae, including Primula and Theophrasta and the Sapotae, including Myrsine, these being the three main lineages in modern understanding of the Primulaceae.

Don described a family of Theophrasteaceae in 1836, with four genera, Theophrasta, Clavija, Jacquinia and Leonia, of which the latter was determined unrelated, and placed this family as closely related to Myrsineae and Sapoteae. Later, De Candolle more formally described a family, Theophrastaceae, based on the genus Theophrasta, in 1844, with six genera, Theophrasta, Clavija, Jacquinia, Oncinus, Monotheca and Reptonia. The latter three are no longer considered related.

Theophrastaceae were included in the order Primulales by Cronquist (1988). The APG system (1998) submerged that order in an enlarged order Ericales (Ericales s.l.), a basal group in the asterids, where the families of Primulales formed a monophyletic primuloid clade. Subsequent molecular phylogenetic analysis showed that the genus Samolus (brook weeds), with about 12–15 additional species and traditionally placed within Primulaceae, as tribe Samoleae, was more closely related to the Theophrastaceae and suggested its transfer. Briefly Samolus was considered a separate family, Samolaceae. The third revision of the APG, APG III (2009) realigned all the primuloid families within a greatly enlarged Primulaceae (Primulaceae s.l.), in which each of the existing families became a subfamily. The newly described Theophrastoideae included Samolus, vastly increasing the area of distribution.

=== Phylogeny ===
The cladogram below shows the infrafamilial phylogenetic relationships of Primulaceae, together with the subfamilial crown ages. Maesoideae forms the basal group, while Primuloideae and Myrsinoideae are in a sister group relationship.

- Primulaceae s.l.
  - 24.1mya
    Maesoideae
  - - 70mya
      Theophrastoideae
    - - 46.4mya
        Primuloideae
      - 53.2mya
        Myrsinoideae

=== Subdivision ===
The phylogenetic relationships of the 8 accepted genera are shown in the cladogram, in which Samolus forms the basal group and is sister to all other Theophrastoideae (Theophrastaceae s.s.), the remaining genera forming two subclades. Alternatively these two subclasses have been designated as two tribes, Samoleae and Theophrasteae:

- Theophrastoideae
  - Samoleae
    Samolus L.
  - Theophrasteae (Theophrastaceae s.s.)
    - - - - Theophrasta L.
          - Neomezia Votsch
        - Clavija Ruiz & Pav.
      - - Jacquinia L.
        - - Deherainia Decne.
          - Votschia B.Ståhl
          - Bonellia Bertero ex Colla

Phylogenetic relationships of Theophrastoideae

The Theophrasteae consist of seven genera and about 100 species, while Samoleae has only the single genus Samolus, with about 12–15 dozen species. In 1903, Theophrastaceae consisted of four genera, Clavija, Jacquinia, Deherainia, and Theophrasta. In 1904, a species of Deherainia was segregated to form the novel genus Neomezia, to create five genera and in 1993 a species of Jacquinia was segregated to form a sixth genus, Votschia. Molecular phylogenetic analyses revealed that Jacquinia was still paraphyletic consisting of two separate and distinct clades, necessitating splitting off another new genus, Bonellia, to make seven genera in total in this tribe.

=== Etymology ===
Theophrastoideae takes its name from the nominative and type genus, Theophrasta, named by Linnaeus after the Ancient Greek philosopher and biologist Theophrastus.

== Botanical authority ==
The botanical authority for the previous family, Theophrastaceae, belongs to David Don (D.Don) for his first description of the family in 1835. The subsequently submerged subfamily bears the authority of Alphonse de Candolle (A.DC.) for his formal conspectus of Theophrastaceae in 1844. The authority for the tribe Theophrasteae is that of Bartling who used the term Theophrastea to describe a grouping of genera, including Theophrasta within the family Ardisiaceae in 1830. This represents the earliest creation of a suprageneric taxon for these genera. The Ardisiaceae were later included in the other primuloid family, Myrsinaceae (Myrsinoideae).

== Distribution and habitat ==
=== Distribution ===
The species of Theophrasteae are largely neotropical, confined to Mesoamerica, Central and South America and the Caribbean.

In contrast Samolus species are mainly restricted to different continents in the Southern Hemisphere with about 4–6 species restricted to North America. However the generic type, Samolus valerandi is near cosmopolitan in its distribution.

=== Habitat ===
Theophrastaceae s.s. are mainly found in lowland regions which have a seasonal, dry climate, and prefer coastal thickets, dry shrub vegetation, or dry deciduous or semideciduous forests. However a number of species of Clavija are found in low montane and lowland rain forests.

Unlike much of the traditional Theophrastoideae, Samolus is found in either flooded areas around rivers and lakes, or in salt marshes.

== Bibliography ==
=== Books ===
- Byng, James W. (2014). "Primulaceae". The Flowering Plants Handbook: A practical guide to families and genera of the world. Plant Gateway Ltd. pp. 399ff. ISBN 978-0-9929993-1-5.
- de Candolle, A. P. (1844). "Theophrastaceae". Prodromus systematis naturalis regni vegetabilis sive enumeratio contracta ordinum, generum specierumque plantarum huc usque cognitarum, juxta methodi naturalis normas digesta 16 vols. Vol. 8. pp. 144–153. (also available online at Gallica)
- Cronquist, Arthur (1988) [1968]. The evolution and classification of flowering plants (2nd ed.). Bronx, N.Y., USA: New York Botanical Garden. ISBN 9780893273323. (Available here at Internet Archive)
- Jussieu, Antoine Laurent de (1789). Genera plantarum: secundum ordines naturales disposita, juxta methodum in Horto regio parisiensi exaratam, anno M.DCC.LXXIV [Genera of Plants Arranged According to Their Natural Orders, Based on the Method Devised in the Royal Garden in Paris in the Year 1774] (in Latin). Paris. OCLC 5161409.(translated into French, with revisions, by Ventenat (1799) as Tableau du règne végétal selon la méthode de Jussieu)
- Kubitzki, K., ed. (2004). Celastrales, Oxalidales, Rosales, Cornales, Ericales. The Families and Genera of Vascular Plants. Vol. VI. Berlin: Springer-Verlag. doi:10.1007/978-3-662-07257-8. ISBN 978-3-662-07257-8. S2CID 12809916.
  - Stahl, B (2004). Theophrastaceae. pp. 472–478., in Kubitzki (2004)
- Linnaeus, Carl (1753). "Theophrasta". Species Plantarum: exhibentes plantas rite cognitas, ad genera relatas, cum differentiis specificis, nominibus trivialibus, synonymis selectis, locis natalibus, secundum systema sexuale digestas. 2 vols. Vol. 1. Stockholm: Impensis Laurentii Salvii. p. 149.(see Species Plantarum)
- Mez, C (1903). "Theophrastaceae". In Adolf Engler (ed.). Das Pflanzenreich: regni vegetablilis conspectus (in German). Vol. 4 (236a) heft 15. Leipzig: Engelmann. pp. 1–21.
- Soltis, Douglas; Soltis, Pamela; Endress, Peter; Chase, M.W.; Manchester, Steven; Judd, Walter; Majure, Lucas; Mavrodiev, Evgeny (2018) [2005]. Phylogeny and Evolution of the Angiosperms: Revised and Updated Edition. University of Chicago Press. pp. 266, 269–271. ISBN 978-0-226-44175-7.

=== Articles ===
- Anderberg, A.A.; Rydin, C.; Kallersjo, M. (1 April 2002). "Phylogenetic relationships in the order Ericales s.l.: Analyses of molecular data from five genes from the plastid and mitochondrial genomes". American Journal of Botany. 89 (4): 677–687. doi:10.3732/ajb.89.4.677. PMID 21665668.
- Don, David (1836). "Clavija ornata". Edwards's Botanical Register. 21: Pl. 1864.
- Källersjö, M.; Bergqvist, G.; Anderberg, A.A. (2000). "Generic realignment in primuloid families of the Ericales s. l.: a phylogenetic analysis based on DNA sequences from three chloroplast genes and morphology". American Journal of Botany. 87 (9): 1325–41. Bibcode:2000AmJB...87.1325K. doi:10.2307/2656725. JSTOR 2656725. PMID 10991903.
- Rose, Jeffrey P.; Kleist, Thomas J.; Löfstrand, Stefan D.; Drew, Bryan T.; Schönenberger, Jürg; Sytsma, Kenneth J. (2018). "Phylogeny, historical biogeography, and diversification of angiosperm order Ericales suggest ancient Neotropical and East Asian connections" (PDF). Molecular Phylogenetics and Evolution. 122: 59–79. Bibcode:2018MolPE.122...59R. doi:10.1016/j.ympev.2018.01.014. PMID 29410353.
- Ståhl, Bertil (1 July 1993). "Votschia, a new genus of Theophrastaceae from northeastern Panama". Brittonia. 45 (3): 204–207. Bibcode:1993Britt..45..204S. doi:10.2307/2807101. JSTOR 2807101. S2CID 43497773.
- Ståhl, Bertil; Stahl, Bertil (1995). "Three New Species of Clavija (Theophrastaceae)". Novon. 5 (4): 370. Bibcode:1995Novon...5..370S. doi:10.2307/3391967. JSTOR 3391967.
- Ståhl, Bertil; Källersjö, Mari (2004). "Reinstatement of Bonellia (Theophrastaceae)". Novon. 14 (1): 115–118. JSTOR 3393447. (Available here at Internet Archive)
- Ståhl, Bertil (2010). "Theophrastaceae". Flora Neotropica. 105: 1–160. JSTOR 29534143.(see also at Google Books)
- Votsch, Wilhelm (1904). "Neue systematisch-anatomische Untersuchungen von Blatt und Achse der Theophrastaceen". Botanische Jahrbücher für Systematik, Pflanzengeschichte und Pflanzengeographie. 33: 502–546.

==== Samolus ====
- Caris, Pieter L.; Smets, Erik F. (May 2004). "A floral ontogenetic study on the sister group relationship between the genus Samolus (Primulaceae) and the Theophrastaceae". American Journal of Botany. 91 (5): 627–643. doi:10.3732/ajb.91.5.627. PMID 21653418.
- Jones, K.; Anderberg, A. A.; De Craene, L. P. Ronse; Wanntorp, L. (October 2012). "Origin, diversification, and evolution of Samolus valerandi (Samolaceae, Ericales)". Plant Systematics and Evolution. 298 (8): 1523–1531. Bibcode:2012PSyEv.298.1523J. doi:10.1007/s00606-012-0655-z. S2CID 15115821.
- Wanntorp, Livia; Anderberg, Arne A. (2011). "Evolution And Diversification Of Brook Weeds (Samolus, Samolaceae, Ericales)". International Journal of Plant Sciences. 172 (2): 250–266. Bibcode:2011IJPlS.172..250W. doi:10.1086/657647. JSTOR 10.1086/657647. S2CID 84493389.

==== APG ====
- Angiosperm Phylogeny Group (1998), "An ordinal classification for the families of flowering plants", Annals of the Missouri Botanical Garden, 85 (4): 531–553, Bibcode:1998AnMBG..85..531., doi:10.2307/2992015, JSTOR 2992015
- Angiosperm Phylogeny Group II (2003), "An update of the Angiosperm Phylogeny Group classification for the orders and families of flowering plants: APG II", Botanical Journal of the Linnean Society, 141 (4), Bremer, B., K. Bremer, M.W. Chase, J.L. Reveal, D.E. Soltis, P.S. Soltis & P.F. Stevens: 399–436, doi:10.1046/j.1095-8339.2003.t01-1-00158.x
- Angiosperm Phylogeny Group III (October 2009), "An update of the Angiosperm Phylogeny Group classification for the orders and families of flowering plants: APG III", Botanical Journal of the Linnean Society, 161 (2), Bremer, B., K. Bremer, M.W. Chase, M.F. Fay, J.L. Reveal, D.E. Soltis, P.S. Soltis & P.F. Stevens: 105–121, doi:10.1111/j.1095-8339.2009.00996.x, hdl:10654/18083
- Angiosperm Phylogeny Group IV; Chase, M. W.; Christenhusz, J. M.; Fay, M. F.; Byng, J. W.; Judd, W. S.; Soltis, D. E.; Mabberley, D. J.; Sennikov, A. N.; Soltis, P. S.; Stevens, P. R. (2016), "An update of the Angiosperm Phylogeny Group classification for the orders and families of flowering plants: APG IV", Botanical Journal of the Linnean Society, 181 (1): 1–20, doi:10.1111/boj.12385

=== Websites ===
- Every, Jon LR (2009). "Neotropical Samolaceae". Neotropikey: Interactive key and information resources for flowering plants of the Neotropics. Royal Botanic Gardens, Kew.
- Stevens, P.F. (2021) [2001]. "Angiosperm Phylogeny Website". AP Web v. 14. Missouri Botanical Garden. (see also Angiosperm Phylogeny Website)
  - Stevens, P.F. (2021a). "Primulaceae"., in Stevens (2021)
  - Stevens, P.F. (2021b). "List of Genera in PRIMULACEAE-THEOPHRASTOIDEAE"., in Stevens (2021)
- Reveal, James L (9 April 2012). "Indices Nominum Supragenericorum Plantarum Vascularium: Alphabetical Listing by Genera of Validly Published Suprageneric Names - T". Plant Biology. University of Maryland and Cornell University.
- Watson, L; Dallwitz, M J (2021) [1992]. "The families of flowering plants: descriptions, illustrations, identification, and information retrieval".
  - Watson, L; Dallwitz, M J (2021a). "Theophrastaceae Link"., in Watson & Dallwitz (2021)
