= Key West Tropical Forest & Botanical Garden =

Arboretum and botanical garden in Key West, Florida

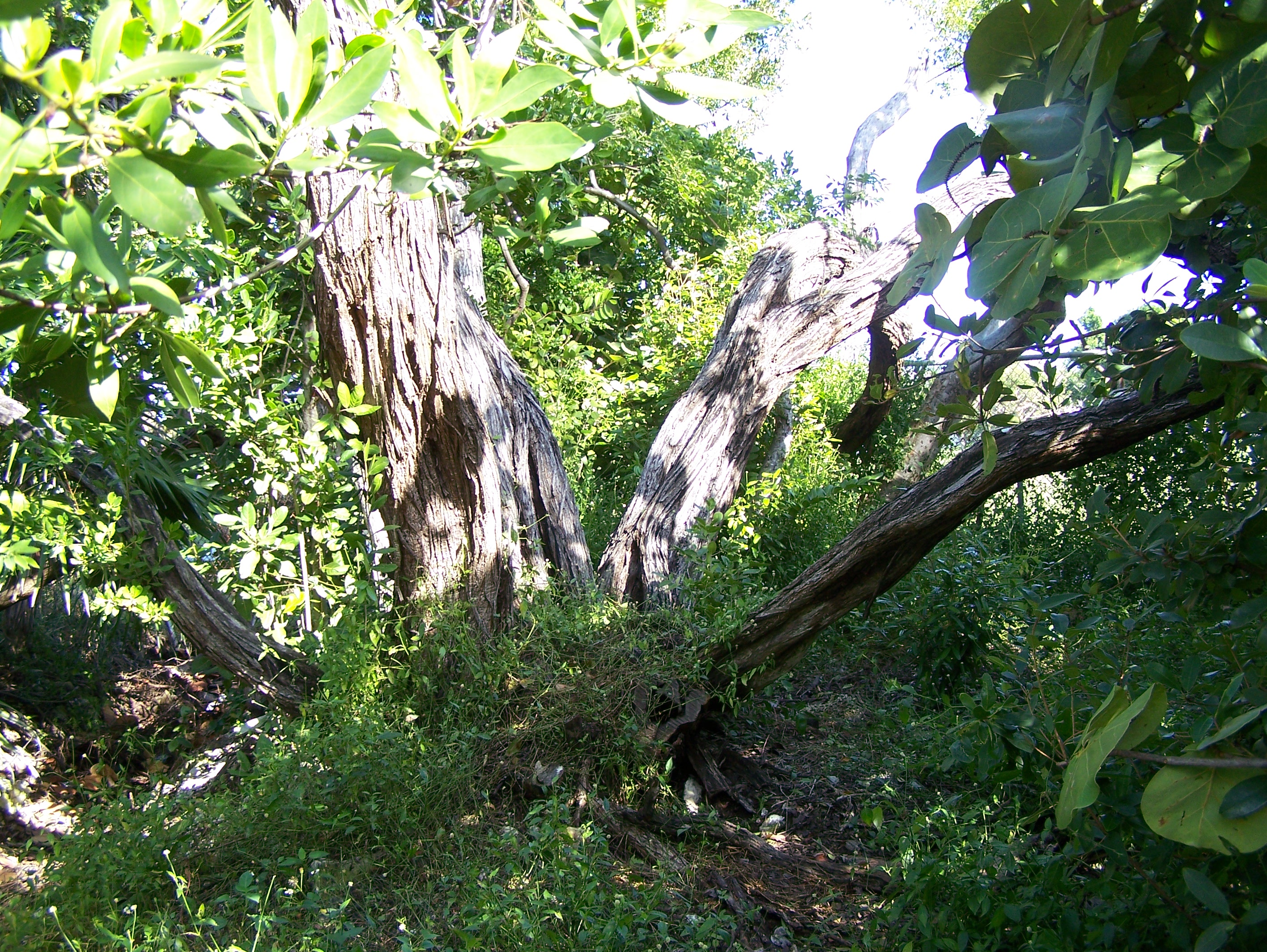
- Interactive map of Key West Tropical Forest & Botanical Garden
- Coordinates: 24°34′25″N 81°44′58″W
- Area: 11 acres (4.5 ha)
- Created: c. 1939
- Operator: Key West Botanical Garden Society
- Website: www.keywest.garden

The Key West Tropical Forest & Botanical Garden is a frost-free arboretum and botanical garden containing a collection of trees, shrubs, and palms, including several "champion tree" specimens. It is located on Stock Island in the municipality of Key West, Florida, United States. It is open daily. There is a nominal fee for admission, with free admission for locals on the first Sunday of every month.

== Notable plants ==
The Garden includes seven trees that are designated either champions or challengers within the National Champion Tree system adjudicated by American Forests and the Florida Division of Forestry. Champions are determined by height, circumference of the trunk, crown spread, and physical condition. The best tree in a species is designated Champion; the second best is Challenger.

- Locust-berry (Byrsonima lucida) - National Champion
- Wild Dilly (Manilkara bahamensis) - National Champion
- Barringtonia (Barringtonia asiatica) - Florida Champion
- Cuban Lignum Vitae (Guaiacum officinale) - Florida Champion
- Arjan Almond (Terminalia arjuna) - Florida Challenger
- Black Olive (Bucida buceras) - Florida Challenger
- Pongam (Pongamia pinnata) - Florida Challenger
- Royal Poinciana (Delonix regia) - Honorable Mention

Other native and imported trees and shrubs in the Garden include:

- Poisonwood (Metopium toxiferum),
- Sea Grape (Coccoloba uvifera),
- Black Ironwood (Krugiodendron ferreum),
- Spanish Stopper (Eugenia foetida),
- Pigeon Plum (Coccoloba diversifolia),
- Tamarind (Tamarindus indica),
- Milk Bark (Drypetes diversifolia),
- Cinnamon Bark (Canella winterana), Gumbo Limbo (Bursera simaruba),
- Woman's Tongue (Albizia lebbeck),
- Lignum Vitae (Guaiacum sanctum), Blolly (Guapira discolor),
- Purge Nut Thicket (Ximenia americana),
- Canary Island date palm (Phoenix canariensis),
- Senegal Date Palm (Phoenix reclinata),
- Florida Thatch Palm (Thrinax radiata),
- Shortleaf Fig (Ficus citrifolia), Marlberry (Ardisia escallonioides),
- Silver Palm (Coccothrinax argentata),
- Red Stopper (Eugenia rhombea),
- Key Thatch Palm (Leucothrinax morrisii),
- Jamaica Dogwood (Piscidia piscipula), False Tamarind (Lysiloma latisiliquum), Bay Cedar (Suriana maritima),
- Wild Coffee (Colubrina arborescens),
- Cinnecord (Acacia choriophylla), Pond Apple (Annona glabra), Limber Caper (Capparis flexuosa),
- Satin Leaf (Chrysophyllum oliviforme),
- Paradise Tree (Simarouba glauca),
- Coral Bean (Erythrina herbacea), Sabal Palm (Sabal palmetto),
- Buccaneer Palm (Pseudophoenix sargentii),
- Lime Prickly-ash (Zanthoxylum fagara), Joewood (Jacquinia keyensis), Lancewood (Nectandra coriacea),
- Green Buttonwood (Conocarpus erectus),
- Washington Palm (Washingtonia filifera var. robusta), and
- Varnish Leaf (Dodonaea viscosa).

== Gallery ==
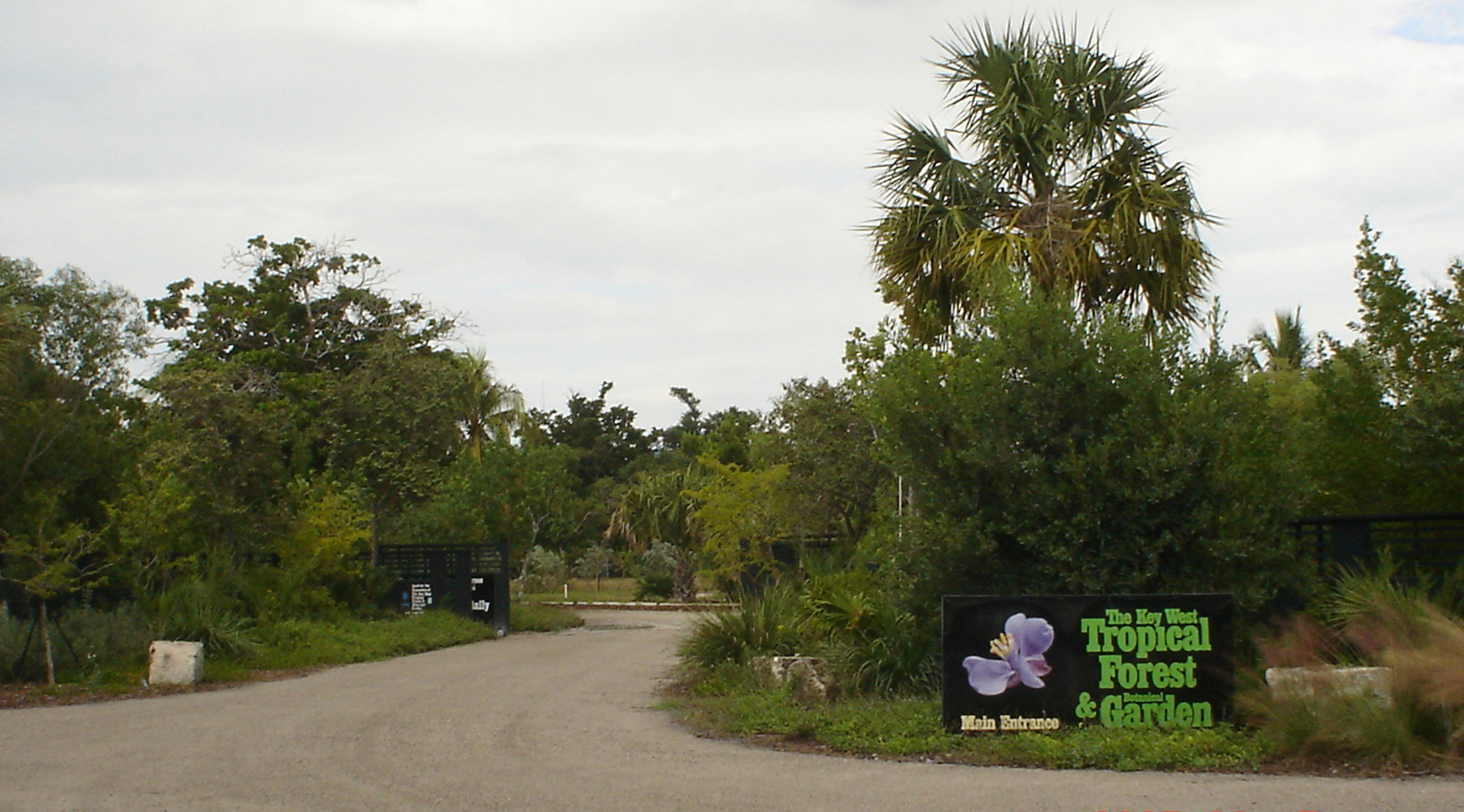

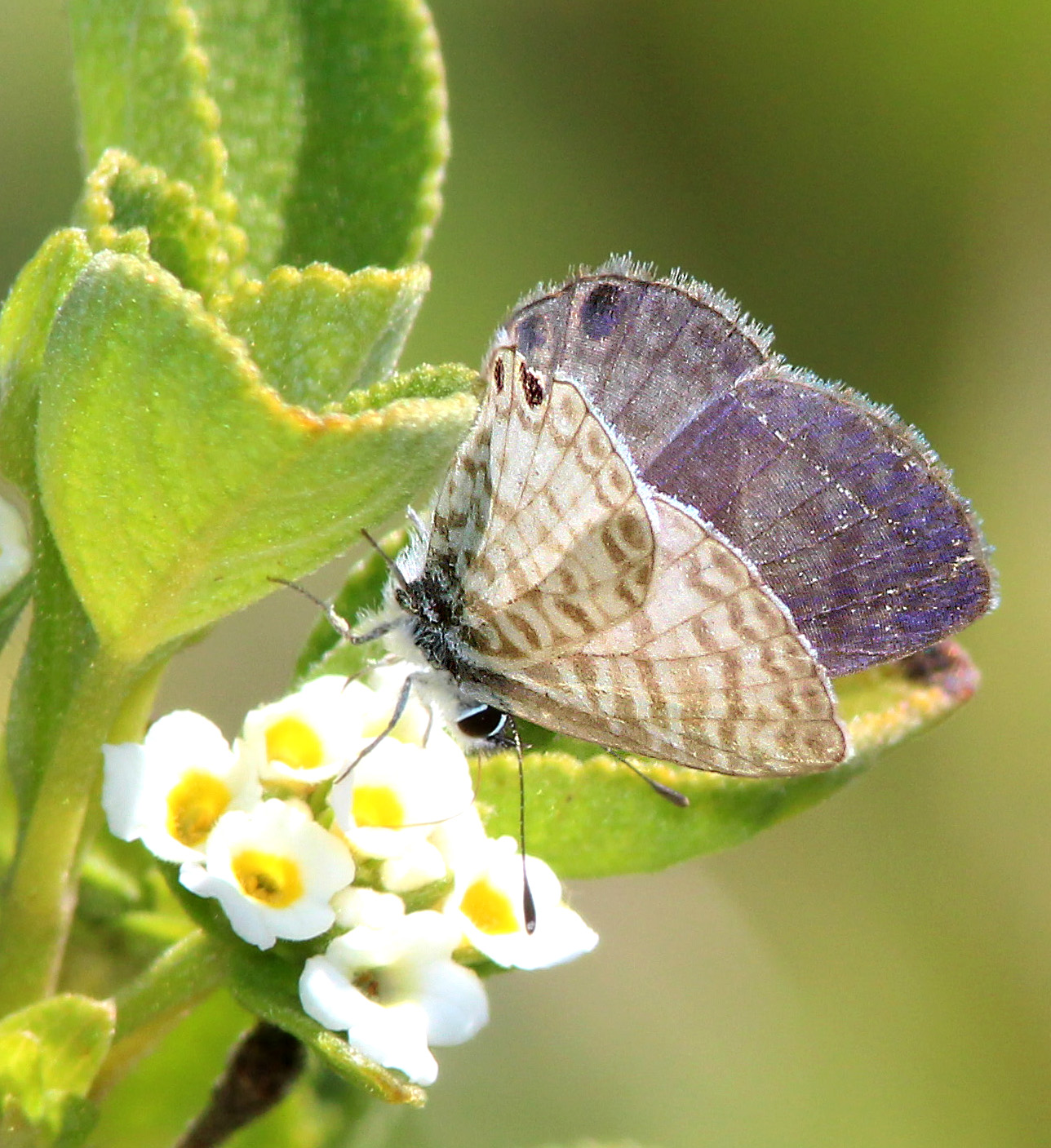

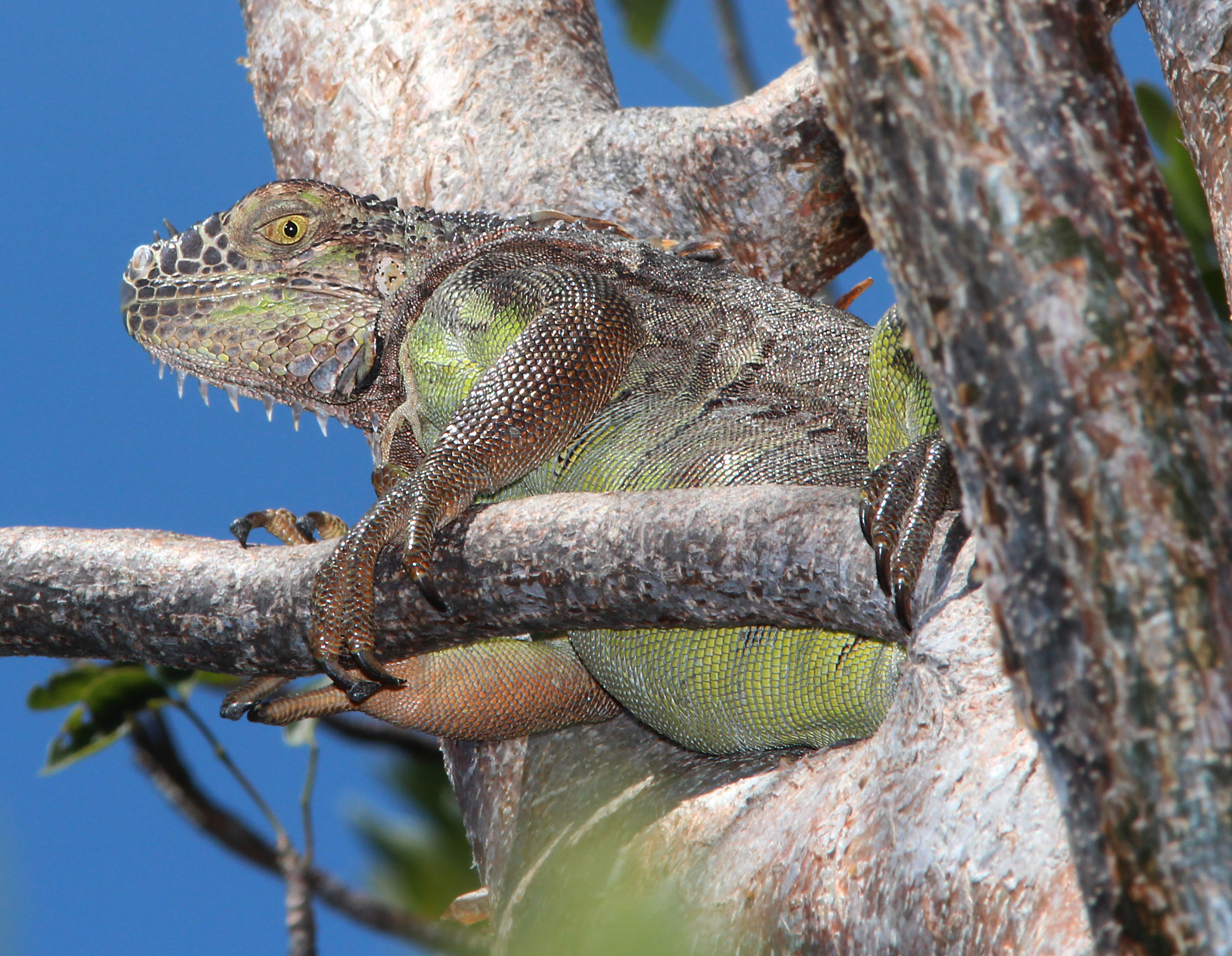

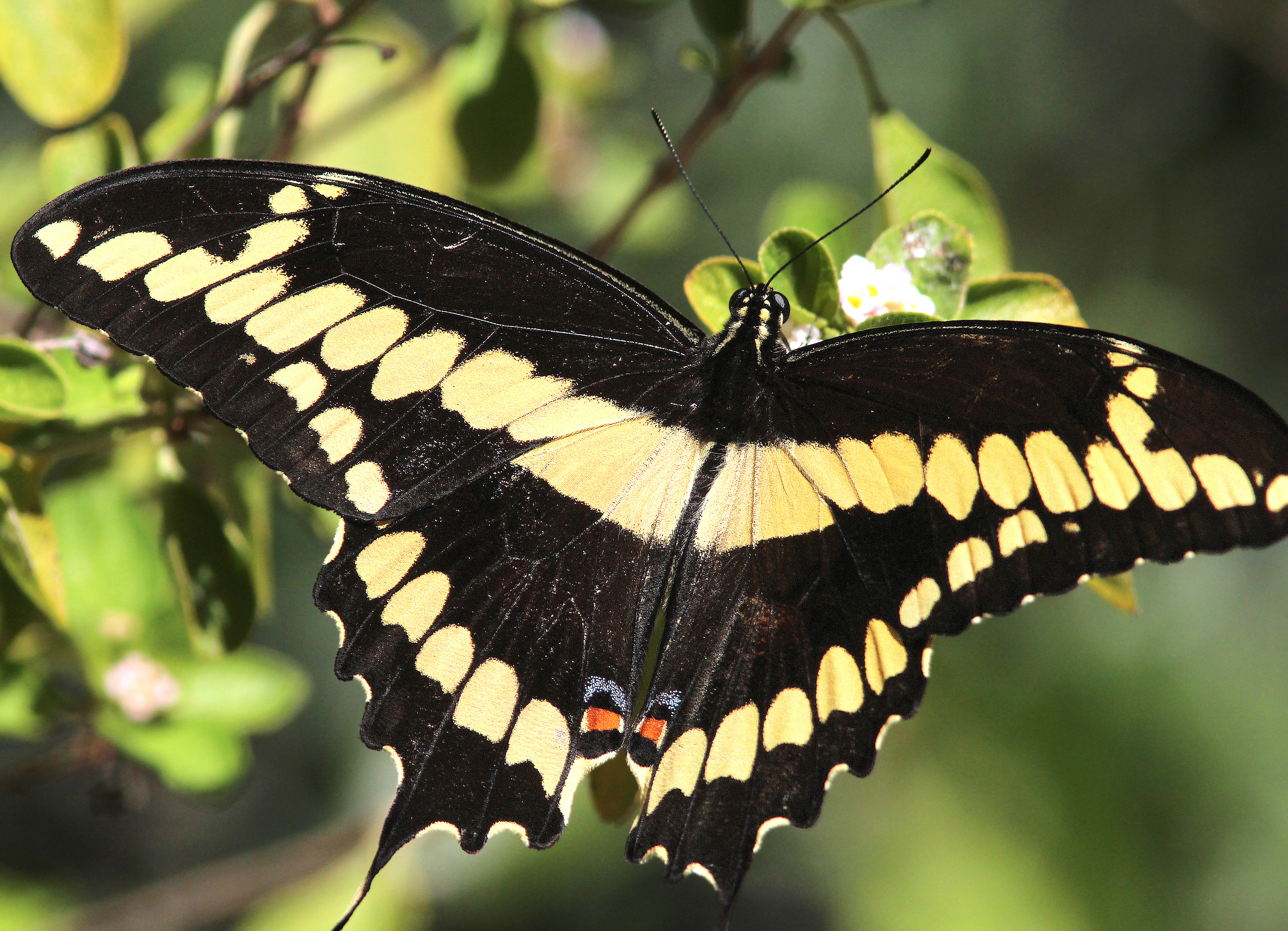

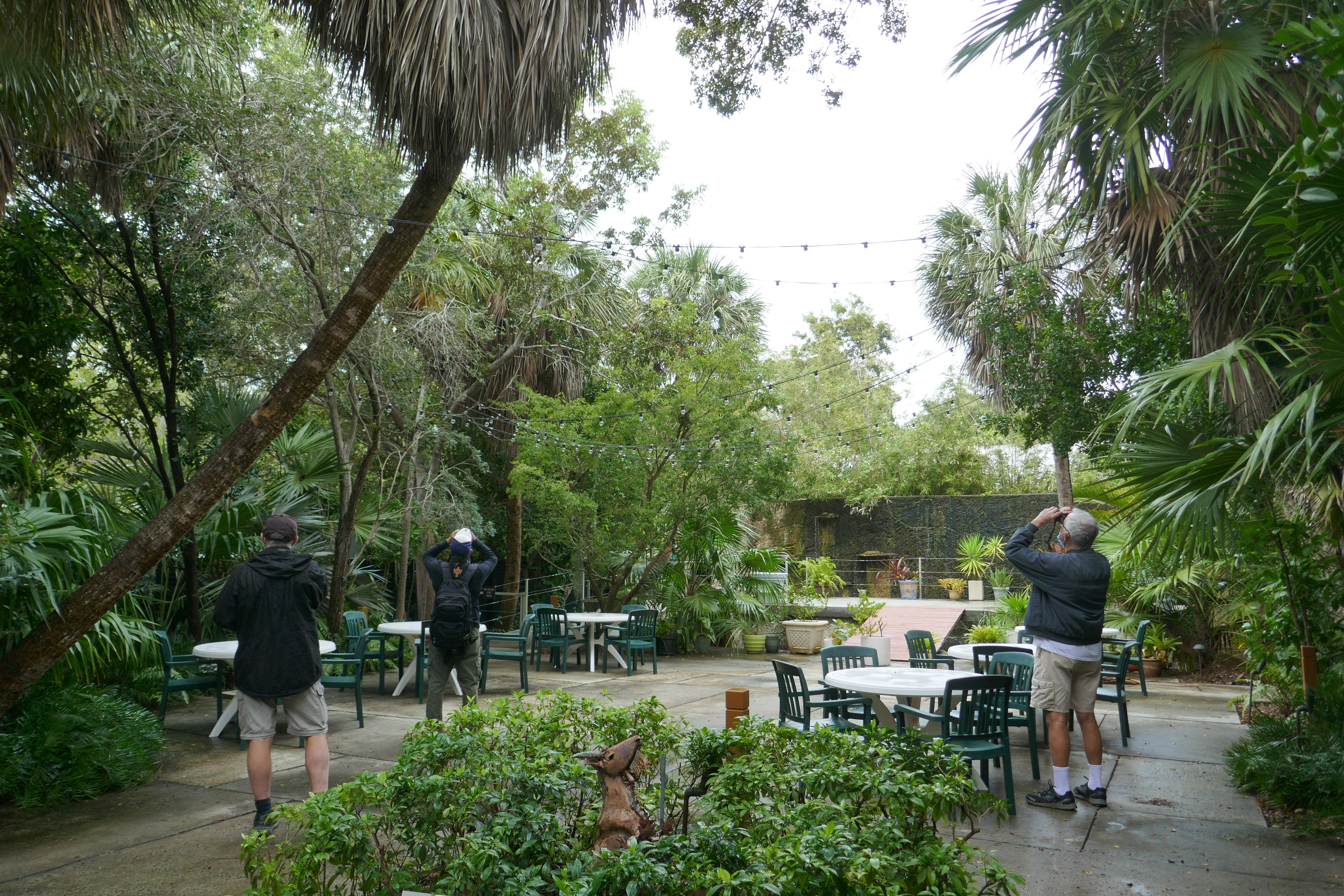

== See also ==
- List of botanical gardens in the United States
