= Pierre Paul Dehérain =

French plant physiologist (1830–1902)

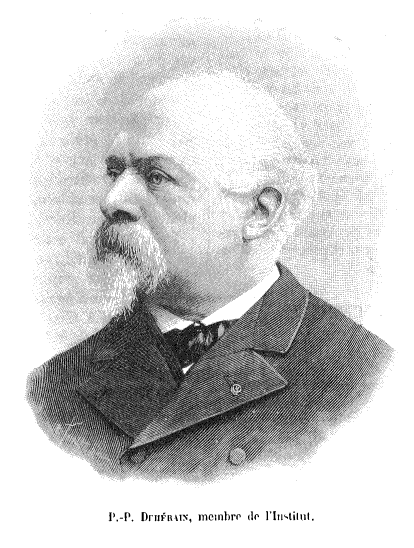
- Pierre Paul Dehérain, 1902
- Born: 19 April 1830; Paris, Kingdom of France
- Died: 7 December 1902 (aged 72)
- Scientific career
- Thesis: Les combinaisons formées par deux chlorures sont-elles des sels ? (1859)

Pierre Paul Dehérain (19 April 1830 in Paris – 7 December 1902) was a French plant physiologist and agricultural chemist. He was notably the doctoral advisor of the Nobel Prize winner Henri Moissan.

He served as an assistant at the Conservatoire national des arts et métiers in Paris, then at the age of 26, began work as a professor at the Collège Chaptal. He obtained his LSc degree in 1856 under Edmond Frémy. Later on, he taught classes in agricultural chemistry at the agricultural school in Grignon, and in 1880, became a professor of plant physiology at the Muséum d'Histoire Naturelle. In 1887 he was elected a member of the Académie des sciences.

As a plant physiologist, he studied the absorption of carbon dioxide by plants and the effect of artificial light, especially ultraviolet rays, on plants. He showed that plants do not absorb only those minerals that are beneficial, as previously thought, but absorb all of them and then use those that they need – so that consumption regulates absorption. He discovered respiration by plant roots and investigated the effect of different minerals on the growth of fruits. He also studied effect of crop rotation on soil quality.

The plant genus Deherainia from the family Theophrastaceae is named after him.

== Selected works ==
- Recherches sur l'emploi agricole des phosphates, 1859 – Research on the agricultural use of phosphates.
- Cours de chimie agricole, professé à L'École d'agriculture de Grignon, 1873 – Agricultural chemistry courses taught at the School of Agriculture at Grignon.
- Traité de chimie agricole : développement des végétaux, terre arable, amendements et engrais, 1892 – Agricultural chemistry treatise: Development of plants, topsoil, modifications and fertilizers.
- Les plantes de grande culture, 1898 – Field crops.
