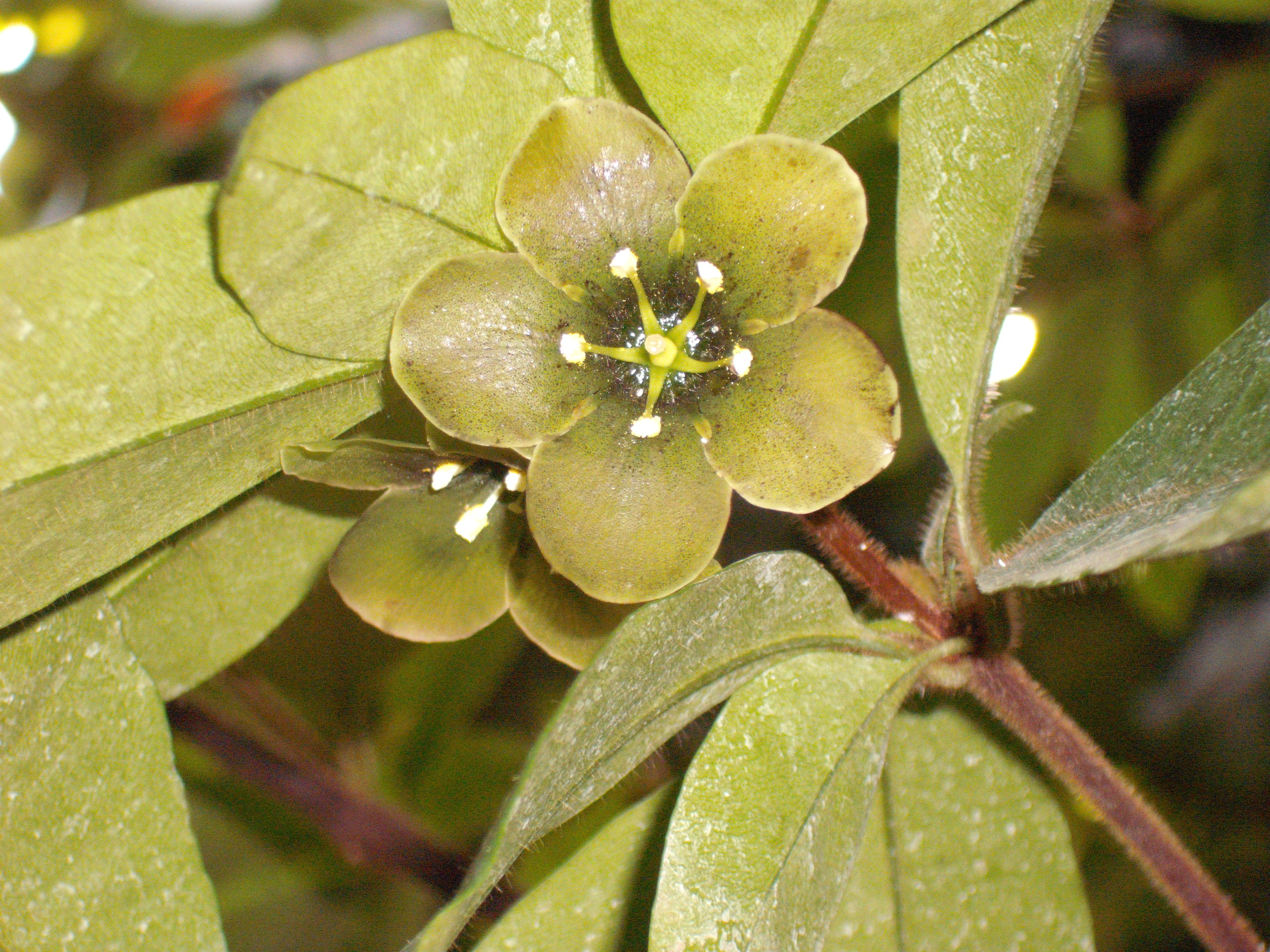
- Deherainia smaragdina flowers

Scientific classification
- Kingdom: Plantae
- Clade: Tracheophytes
- Clade: Angiosperms
- Clade: Eudicots
- Clade: Asterids
- Order: Ericales
- Family: Primulaceae
- Subfamily: Theophrastoideae
- Tribe: Theophrasteae
- Genus: Deherainia; Decne.

Type species
- Jacquinia smaragdina Planch. ex Linden

= Deherainia =

Genus of flowering plants

Deherainia is a genus of plants in the family Primulaceae, native to Central America.

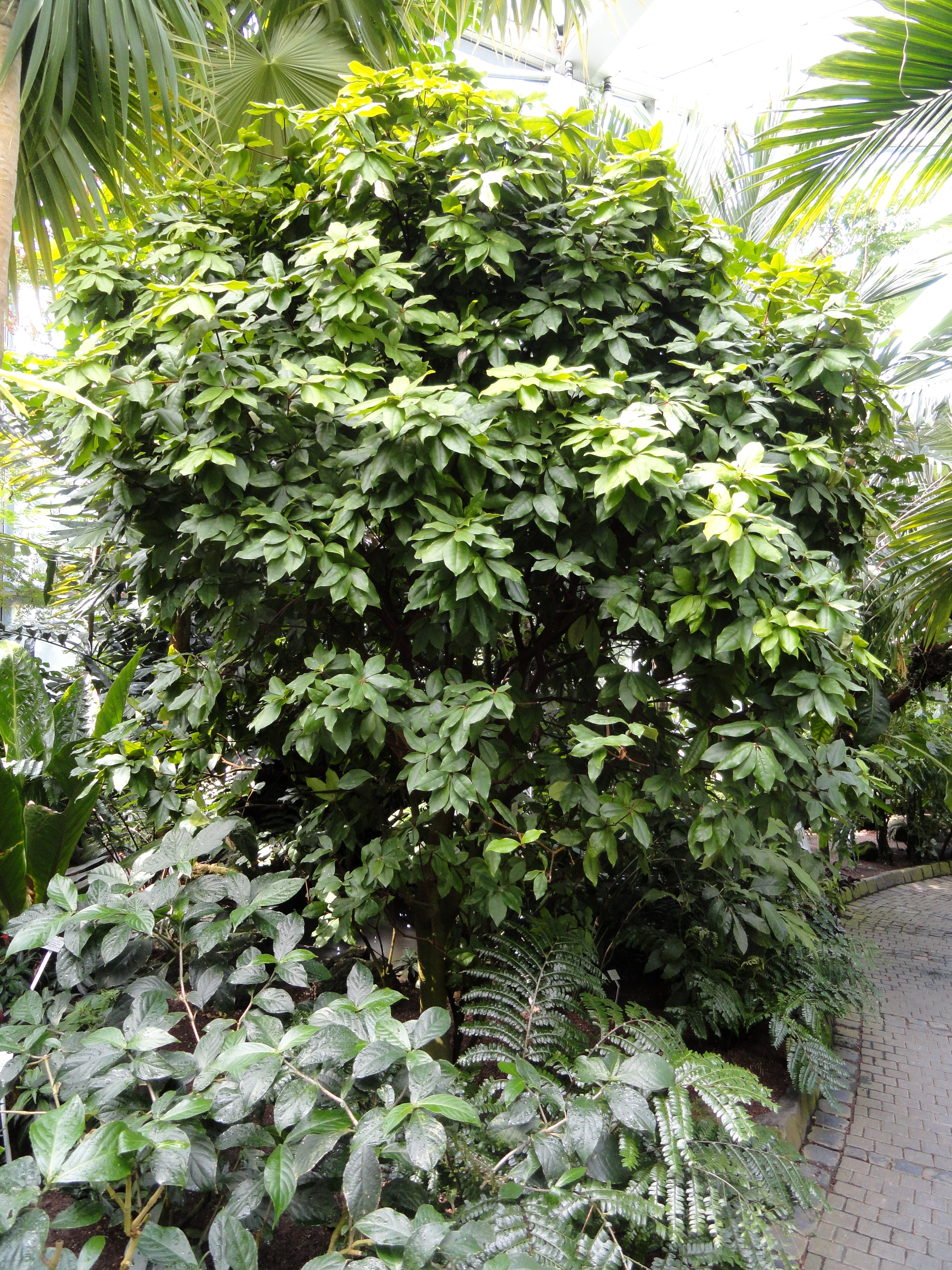
Deherainia smaragdina cultivated in the Palmengarten Frankfurt

== Taxonomy ==
It was published by Joseph Decaisne in 1876. The type species is Jacquinia smaragdina Planch. ex Linden.

=== Species ===
The genus has two species:

- Deherainia matudae Lundell
- Deherainia smaragdina (Planch. ex Linden) Decne.

=== Formerly included ===
- Deherainia cubensis (Radlk.) Mez. is a synonym of Neomezia cubensis (Radlk.) Votsch
- Deherainia cubensis subsp. oligospinosa Lepper is a synonym of Neomezia cubensis subsp. oligospinosa (Lepper) Borhidi

=== Etymology ===
The generic name Deherainia honours Pierre-Paul Dehérain.

== Distribution ==
It is native to Belize, Costa Rica, Guatemala, Honduras, and Mexico.

== Ecology ==
=== Pollination ===
The very unpleasant floral fragrance attracts flies as pollinators.
