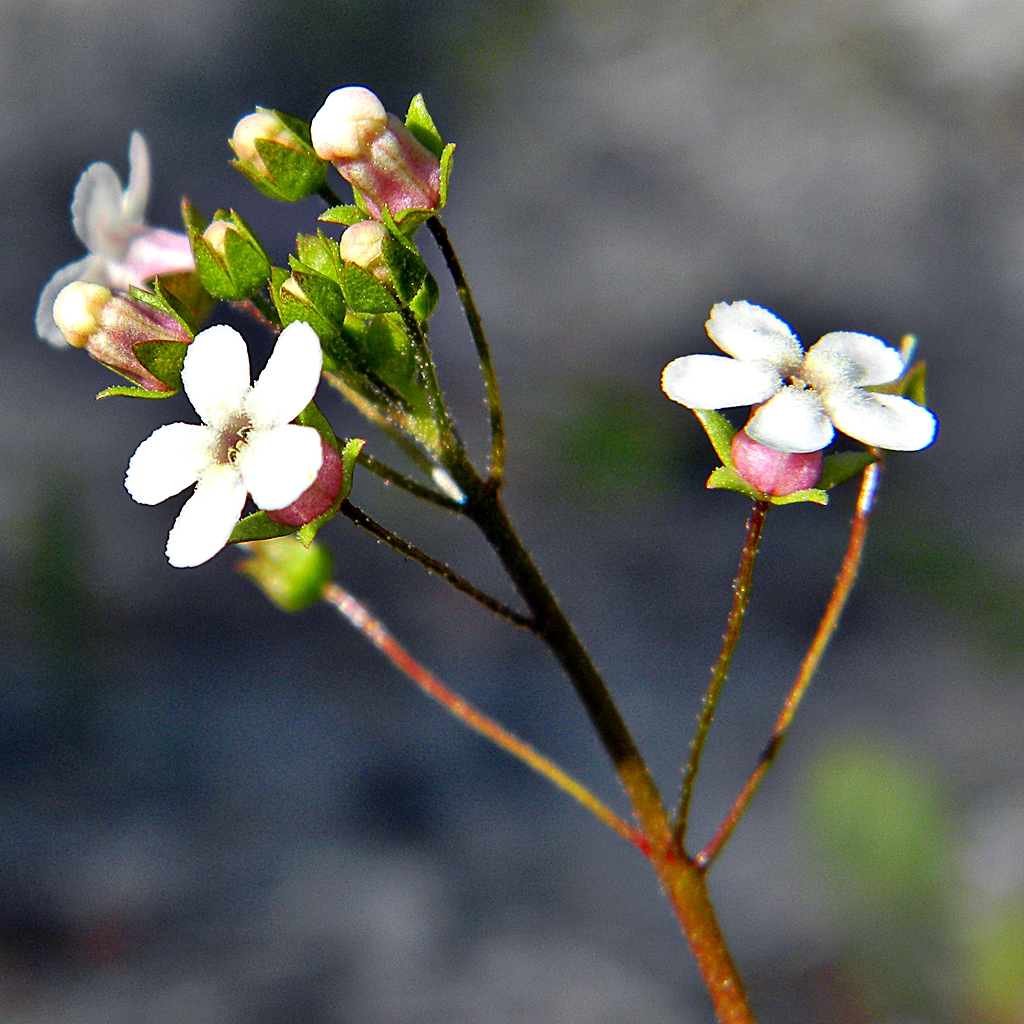
- Sweetbay Natural Area, Palm Beach County, Florida.

Scientific classification
- Kingdom: Plantae
- Clade: Tracheophytes
- Clade: Angiosperms
- Clade: Eudicots
- Clade: Asterids
- Order: Ericales
- Family: Primulaceae
- Genus: Samolus
- Species: S. ebracteatus

Binomial name
- Samolus ebracteatus Kunth

Synonyms
- Samodia ebracteata (Kunth) Baudo; Samolus alyssoides A. Heller; Samolus cuneatus Small; Samolus ebracteatus subsp. alyssoides (A. Heller) R. Knuth; Samolus ebracteatus subsp. cuneatus (Small) R. Knuth; Samolus ebracteatus var. cuneatus (Small) Henrickson

= Samolus ebracteatus =

Species of flowering plant

Samolus ebracteatus, the limewater brookweed, is a plant species known to Mexico, Central America, the West Indies, and to the United States (Florida, Nevada, Texas, Louisiana, Oklahoma, Kansas and New Mexico). It is found in wetlands, including seashore salt marshes, and near springs and intermittent rivers in desert areas.

Samolus ebracteatus is a perennial herb up to 60 cm (24 inches) tall. Pinkish or white flowers are borne in a terminal raceme.

The species is quite variable, with some recognizing 5 varieties and others not recognizing any subspecific taxa.
