= Votschia =

Scientific classification
- Kingdom: Plantae
- Clade: Tracheophytes
- Clade: Angiosperms
- Clade: Eudicots
- Clade: Asterids
- Order: Ericales
- Family: Primulaceae
- Subfamily: Theophrastoideae
- Genus: Votschia; B.Ståhl
- Species: V. nemophila

Binomial name
- Votschia nemophila (Pittier) B.Ståhl

Synonyms
- Jacquinia nemophila Pittier

Species of flowering plants

Votschia is a monotypic genus of flowering plants belonging to the family Primulaceae. It only contains one known species, Votschia nemophila. It is also in the Theophrastoideae subfamily.

It is native to Panama.

The genus name of Votschia is in honour of Oskar Hermann Wilhelm Votsch (1879–1927), a German botanist and teacher in Delitzsch, Germany. The Latin specific epithet of nemophila means "woodland-loving". It comes from the Latin word nemus, which means "grove" or "wooded glade", and the Greek word philos, which means "loving". Both the genus and the species were first described and published in Brittonia Vol.45 on page 204–205 in 1993.
