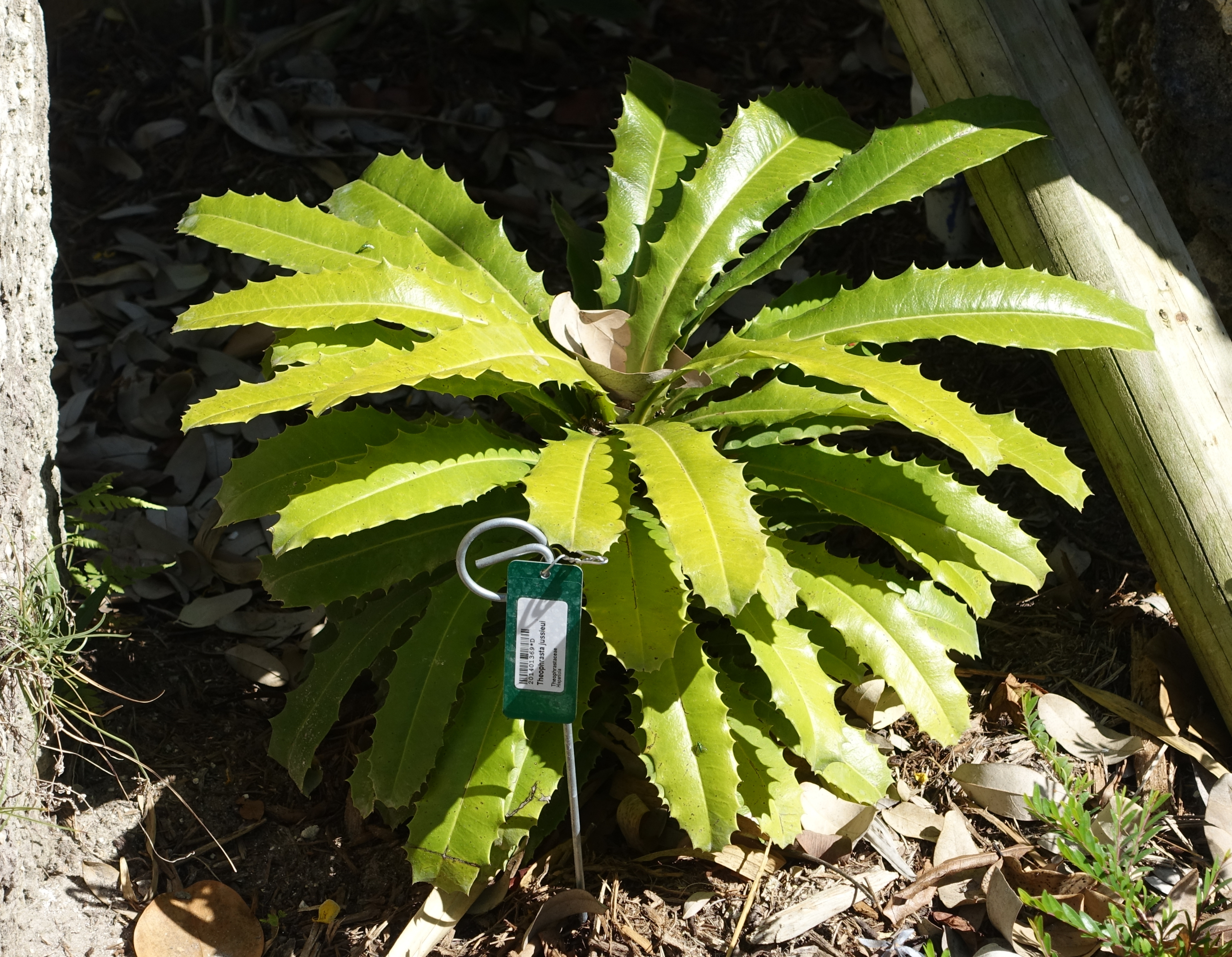
- Theophrasta jussieui at the Naples Botanical Garden

Scientific classification
- Kingdom: Plantae
- Clade: Embryophytes
- Clade: Tracheophytes
- Clade: Angiosperms
- Clade: Eudicots
- Clade: Asterids
- Order: Ericales
- Family: Primulaceae
- Subfamily: Theophrastoideae
- Genus: Theophrasta; L.

Type species
- Theophrasta americana L.

Species
- See text

= Theophrasta =

Genus of flowering plants

Theophrasta is a genus of flowering plants in the family Primulaceae, native to the Caribbean island of Hispaniola. Named in honor of the naturalist Theophrastus, they are occasionally kept as ornamentals in greenhouses.

== Species ==
Currently accepted species include:

- Theophrasta americana L.
- Theophrasta jussieui Lindl.
