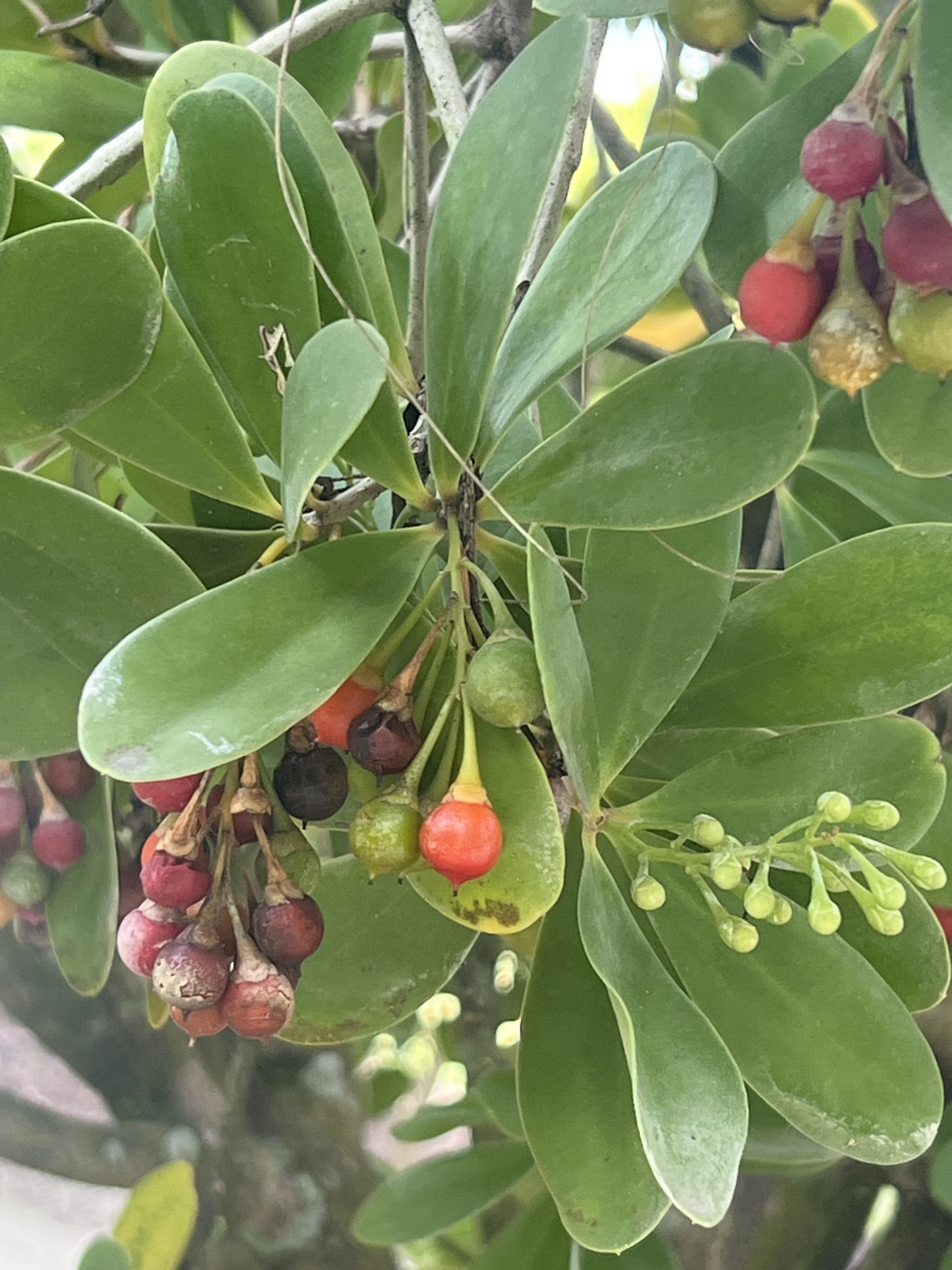
- Jacquinia arborea at Paradise Palms

Scientific classification
- Kingdom: Plantae
- Clade: Tracheophytes
- Clade: Angiosperms
- Clade: Eudicots
- Clade: Asterids
- Order: Ericales
- Family: Primulaceae
- Genus: Jacquinia
- Species: J. arborea

Binomial name
- Jacquinia arborea Vahl

Synonyms
- Chrysophyllum barbasco Loefl.; Chrysophyllum barbasco Loefl. ex DC.; Jacquinia armillaris var. arborea (Vahl) Griseb.; Jacquinia barbasco (Loefl.) Mez; Jacquinia berteroi var. venosa Mez; Jaquinia aborea Vahl

= Jacquinia arborea =

Species of tree

Jacquinia arborea is a species of flowering plant, a tree in the family Primulaceae. Common names for this species is torchwood, azucares, barbasco, and braceletwood.

The species is native to Aruba, Dominican Republic, Honduras, Jamaica, Mexico, Netherlands Antilles, Puerto Rico, Trinidad-Tobago, and Venezuela.
