= Jacquinia =

- J. pungens flowers

Scientific classification
- Kingdom: Plantae
- Clade: Tracheophytes
- Clade: Angiosperms
- Clade: Eudicots
- Clade: Asterids
- Order: Ericales
- Family: Primulaceae
- Subfamily: Theophrastoideae
- Tribe: Theophrasteae
- Genus: Jacquinia; L.

Species
- See text

Genus of flowering plants

Jacquinia is a genus of evergreen shrubs and trees in the family Primulaceae, native to Central America and the Caribbean.

The genus was established by Linnaeus in 1760 and named by him in honor of Nikolaus Joseph von Jacquin.

== Species ==
There are about 86 species. IPNI.

- Jacquinia aciculata
- Jacquinia aculeata
- Jacquinia acunana
- Jacquinia albiflora
- Jacquinia angustifolia
- Jacquinia arborea
- Jacquinia arenicola
- Jacquinia aristata
- Jacquinia armillaris
- Jacquinia aurantiaca
- Jacquinia axillaris
- Jacquinia barbasco
- Jacquinia berteri
- Jacquinia berterii
- Jacquinia bissei
- Jacquinia brasiliensis
- Jacquinia brevifolia
- Jacquinia brunnescens
- Jacquinia caracasana
- Jacquinia clarendonensis
- Jacquinia comosa
- Jacquinia conzattii
- Jacquinia cuneata
- Jacquinia curtissii
- Jacquinia dichotoma
- Jacquinia donnell-smithii
- Jacquinia eggersii
- Jacquinia ferruginea
- Jacquinia flammea
- Jacquinia frutescens
- Jacquinia geniculata
- Jacquinia gracilis
- Jacquinia incrustata
- Jacquinia indica
- Jacquinia keyensis
- Jacquinia leoflingii
- Jacquinia leptopoda
- Jacquinia liebmannii
- Jacquinia linearis
- Jacquinia lippoldii
- Jacquinia loeflingii
- Jacquinia longifolia
- Jacquinia macrantha
- Jacquinia macrocarpa
- Jacquinia maisiana
- Jacquinia mexicana
- Jacquinia moana
- Jacquinia montana
- Jacquinia morenoana
- Jacquinia mucronata
- Jacquinia mucronulata
- Jacquinia nemophila
- Jacquinia nipensis
- Jacquinia nitida
- Jacquinia obovata
- Jacquinia oligantha
- Jacquinia ovalifolia
- Jacquinia paludicola
- Jacquinia panamensis
- Jacquinia pauciflora
- Jacquinia petiolata
- Jacquinia polyphlebia
- Jacquinia pringlei
- Jacquinia proctorii
- Jacquinia pubescens
- Jacquinia pungens
- Jacquinia racemosa
- Jacquinia revoluta
- Jacquinia robusta
- Jacquinia roigii
- Jacquinia ruscifolia
- Jacquinia schiedeana
- Jacquinia schippii
- Jacquinia seleriana
- Jacquinia sessiliflora
- Jacquinia shaferi
- Jacquinia smaragdina
- Jacquinia sphaeroidea
- Jacquinia sprucei
- Jacquinia stenophylla
- Jacquinia stenophylloides
- Jacquinia submembranacea
- Jacquinia umbellata
- Jacquinia venosa
- Jacquinia verticillaris
- Jacquinia yunquensis
