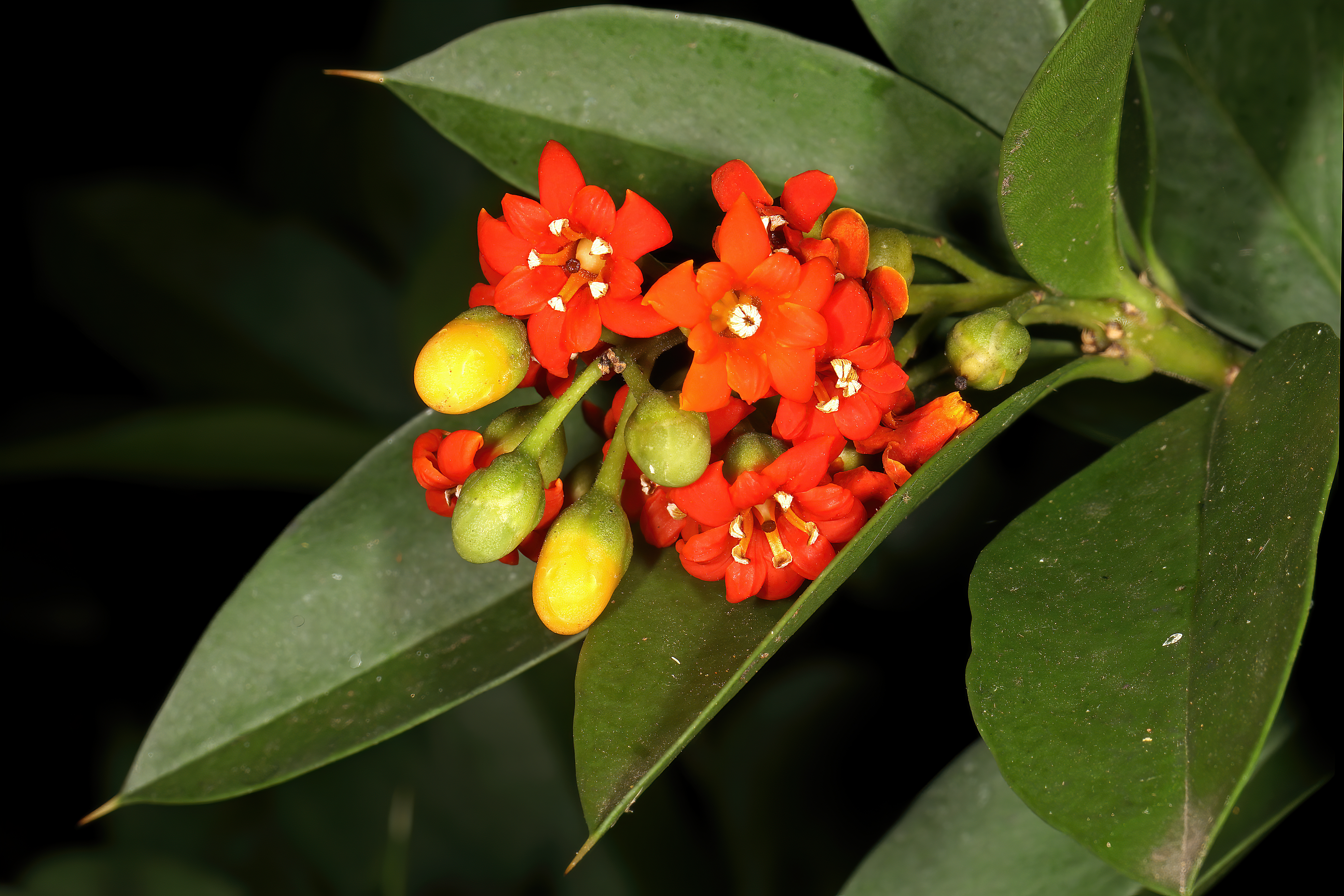
- Bonellia macrocarpa

Scientific classification
- Kingdom: Plantae
- Clade: Tracheophytes
- Clade: Angiosperms
- Clade: Eudicots
- Clade: Asterids
- Order: Ericales
- Family: Primulaceae
- Subfamily: Theophrastoideae
- Tribe: Theophrasteae
- Genus: Bonellia; Bertero ex Colla (1824)

Species
- 29; see text

Synonyms
- Sileriana Urb. & Loes. (1913), not validly publ.

= Bonellia (plant) =

Genus of flowering plants

Bonellia is a genus of flowering plants in the primula family, Primulaceae. It includes 29 species native to the tropical Americas, from Mexico to Venezuela and Peru.

== Species ==
29 species are accepted.

- Bonellia albiflora (Lundell) B.Ståhl & Källersjö
- Bonellia bissei (Lepper) Lepper & J.E.Gut.
- Bonellia brevifolia (Urb.) B.Ståhl & Källersjö
- Bonellia brunnescens (Urb.) Lepper & J.E.Gut.
- Bonellia curtissii (Britton) Lepper & J.E.Gut.
- Bonellia flammea (Millsp. ex Mez) B.Ståhl & Källersjö
- Bonellia frutescens (Mill.) B.Ståhl & Källersjö
- Bonellia fruticulosa Lepper & J.E.Gut.
- Bonellia lippoldii (Lepper) B.Ståhl & Källersjö
- Bonellia loeflingii (Carrasquel) B.Ståhl & Källersjö
- Bonellia longifolia (Standl.) B.Ståhl & Källersjö
- Bonellia macrocarpa (Cav.) B.Ståhl & Källersjö
- Bonellia moana (Borhidi) Lepper & J.E.Gut.
- Bonellia montana (B.Ståhl) B.Ståhl & Källersjö
- Bonellia mucronata (Roem. & Schult.) B.Ståhl & Källersjö
- Bonellia nervosa (C.Presl) B.Ståhl & Källersjö
- Bonellia nitida (B.Ståhl) B.Ståhl & Källersjö
- Bonellia oligantha (Borhidi) Lepper & J.E.Gut.
- Bonellia paludicola (Standl.) B.Ståhl & Källersjö
- Bonellia pauciflora (B.Ståhl & F.S.Axelrod) B.Ståhl & Källersjö
- Bonellia pringlei (Bartlett) B.Ståhl & Källersjö
- Bonellia robusta (Urb.) Lepper & J.E.Gut.
- Bonellia seleriana (Urb. & Loes. ex Mez) B.Ståhl & Källersjö
- Bonellia shaferi (Urb.) B.Ståhl & Källersjö
- Bonellia sprucei (Mez) B.Ståhl & Källersjö
- Bonellia stenophylla (Urb.) B.Ståhl & Källersjö
- Bonellia stenophylloides (Borhidi) Lepper & J.E.Gut.
- Bonellia umbellata (A.DC.) B.Ståhl & Källersjö
- Bonellia verrucosa Lepper & J.E.Gut.
