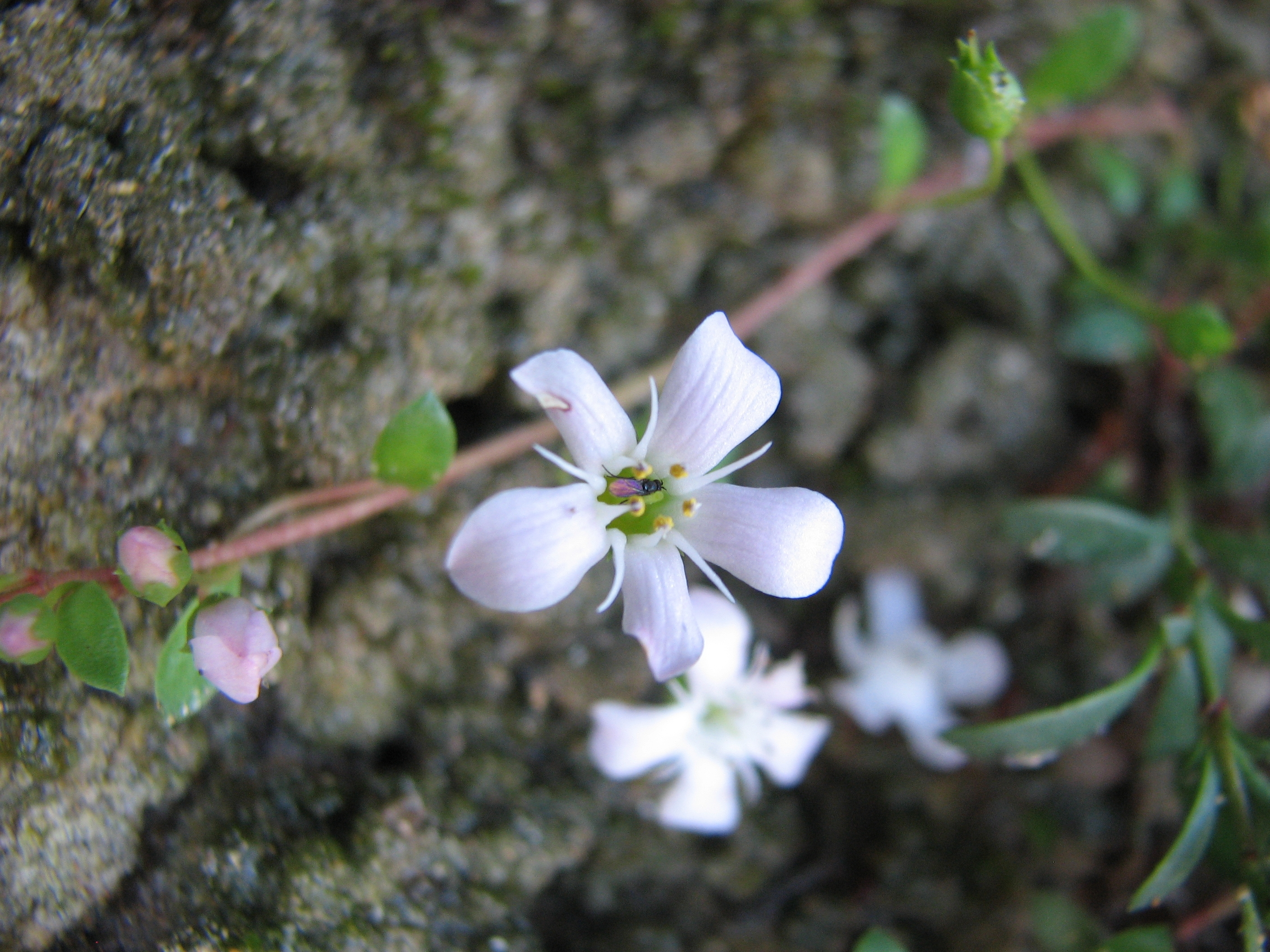
- At Cape Otway, Victoria, Australia

Scientific classification
- Kingdom: Plantae
- Clade: Tracheophytes
- Clade: Angiosperms
- Clade: Eudicots
- Clade: Asterids
- Order: Ericales
- Family: Primulaceae
- Genus: Samolus
- Species: S. repens

Binomial name
- Samolus repens (G.Forst.) Pers.

Synonyms
- Lysimachia sedoides Lehm.; Samolus ambiguus R.Brown; S. eremaeus Jacobs; S. littoralis R.Brown; S. platyphyllos F.Muell.; S. repens var. ambiguus (R.Brown) Benth.; S. repens var. incana (Labill.) Duby in DC; S. repens var. floribundus Benth.; S. repens var. paucifolius Benth.; S. repens var. procumbens Knuth; S. repens var. strictus Cock.; Sheffieldia repens G.Forst.

= Samolus repens =

Species of flowering plant

Samolus repens is a species of water pimpernel native to Australia, New Zealand and near-by Pacific islands, and South America (South Chile), where it is common in temperate and subtropic coastlines. Common names include creeping brookweed and creeping bushweed. Samolus repens has small white or occasionally pink flowers with a flowering period from September through to March or April.

== Taxonomy ==
The species was first described by Georg Forster in 1776 as Sheffieldia repens and placed in the genus Samolus in 1805 by Christiaan Hendrik Persoon. The following synonyms exist:

- Lysimachia sedoides Lehm.
- Samolus ambiguus R.Brown
- S. eremaeus Jacobs
- S. littoralis R.Brown
- S. platyphyllos F.Muell.
- S. repens var. ambiguus (R.Brown) Benth.
- S. repens var. incana (Labill.) Duby in DC
- S. repens var. floribundus Benth.
- S. repens var. paucifolius Benth.
- S. repens var. procumbens Knuth
- S. repens var. strictus Cock.
- Sheffieldia repens Forst.
