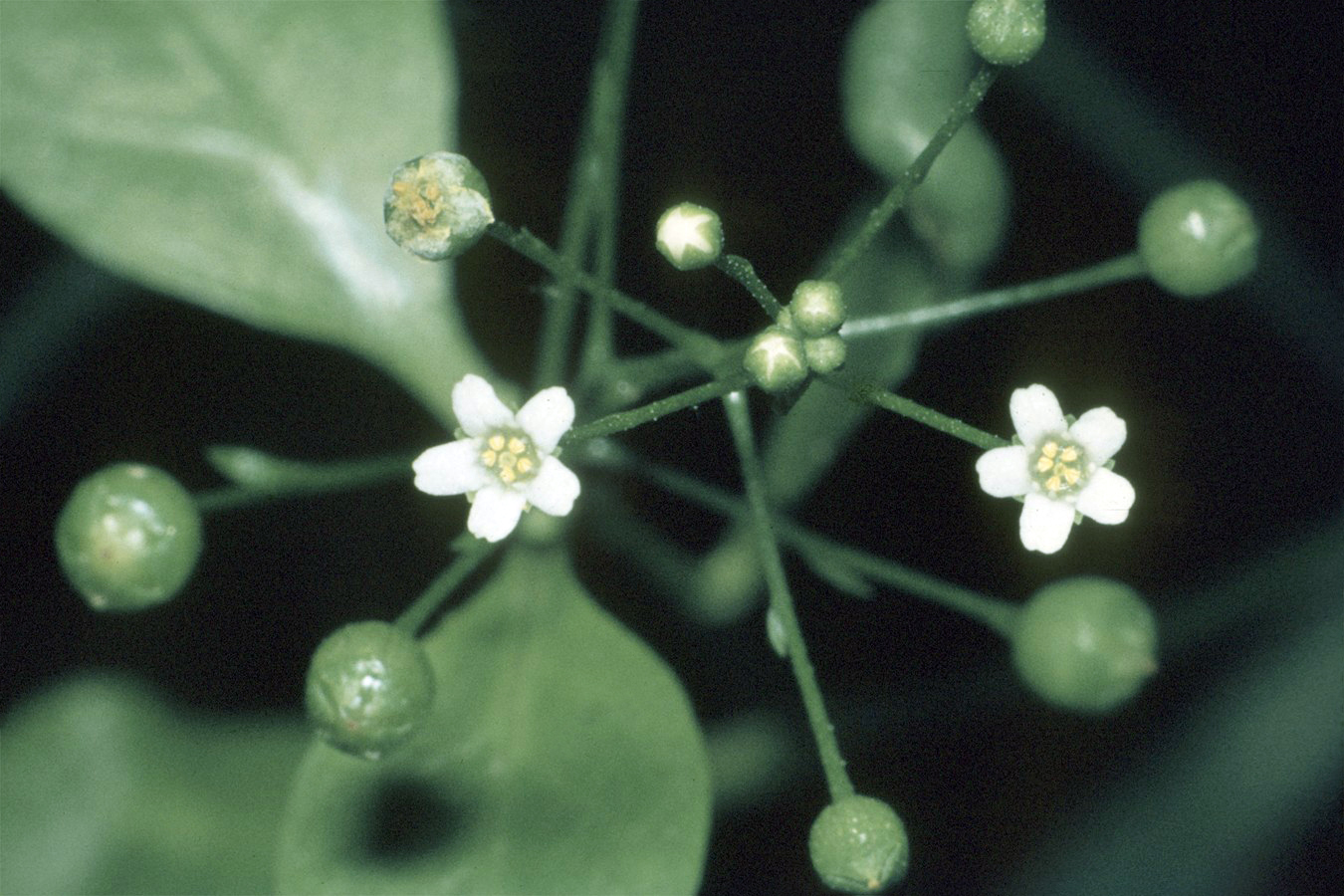
- S. valerandi close-up of flower
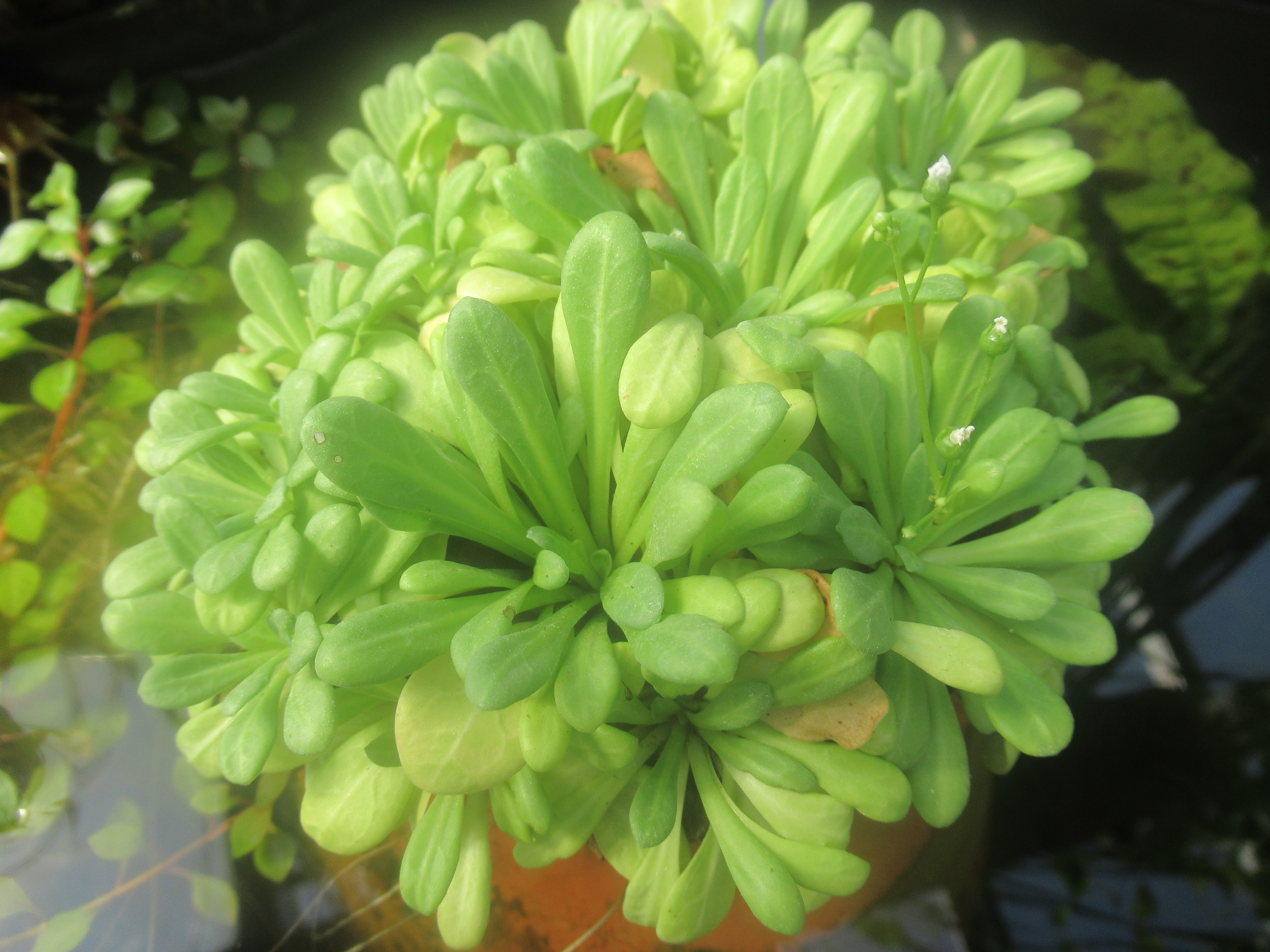
- S. valerandi

Scientific classification
- Kingdom: Plantae
- Clade: Tracheophytes
- Clade: Angiosperms
- Clade: Eudicots
- Clade: Asterids
- Order: Ericales
- Family: Primulaceae
- Subfamily: Theophrastoideae
- Tribe: Samoleae; Rchb.
- Genus: Samolus; L.

Type species
- Samolus valerandi L.

= Samolus =

Genus of flowering plants in the primrose family

Samolus (known as brookweed, or water pimpernel) is a widely distributed genus of about a dozen species of water-loving herbs and amphibious flowering plants. According to the APG III system of classification, the genus falls within the primrose family, Primulaceae, under the order containing the rhododendroid eudicots, Ericales. It was considered closely related to a clade comprising the Theophrastaceae, and was likewise treated as part of that family (or its own monogeneric family, the Samolaceae). The APG III system does not recognize these families, instead classifying all former Theophrastaceae genera within the family Primulaceae.

== Species ==
The last complete taxonomic treatment of this genus recognizes the following species:

- Samolus cinerascens
- Samolus dichondrifolius
- Samolus ebracteatus
- Samolus junceus
- Samolus porosus
- Samolus pyrolifolius
- Samolus repens
- Samolus spathulatus
- Samolus subnudicaulis
- Samolus vagans
- Samolus valerandi

Although some local floras recognize the North-American populations of S. valerandi as a separate species (S. parviflorus) or subspecies (S. valerandi ssp. parviflorus), molecular and morphological data indicate that S. vagans and S. parviflorus should not be regarded as separate species but as part of a widespread "S. valerandi species complex.

== Bibliography ==
- Wanntorp, Livia; Anderberg, Arne A. (2011). "Evolution And Diversification Of Brook Weeds (Samolus, Samolaceae, Ericales)". International Journal of Plant Sciences. 172 (2): 250–266. doi:10.1086/657647. JSTOR 10.1086/657647. S2CID 84493389.
