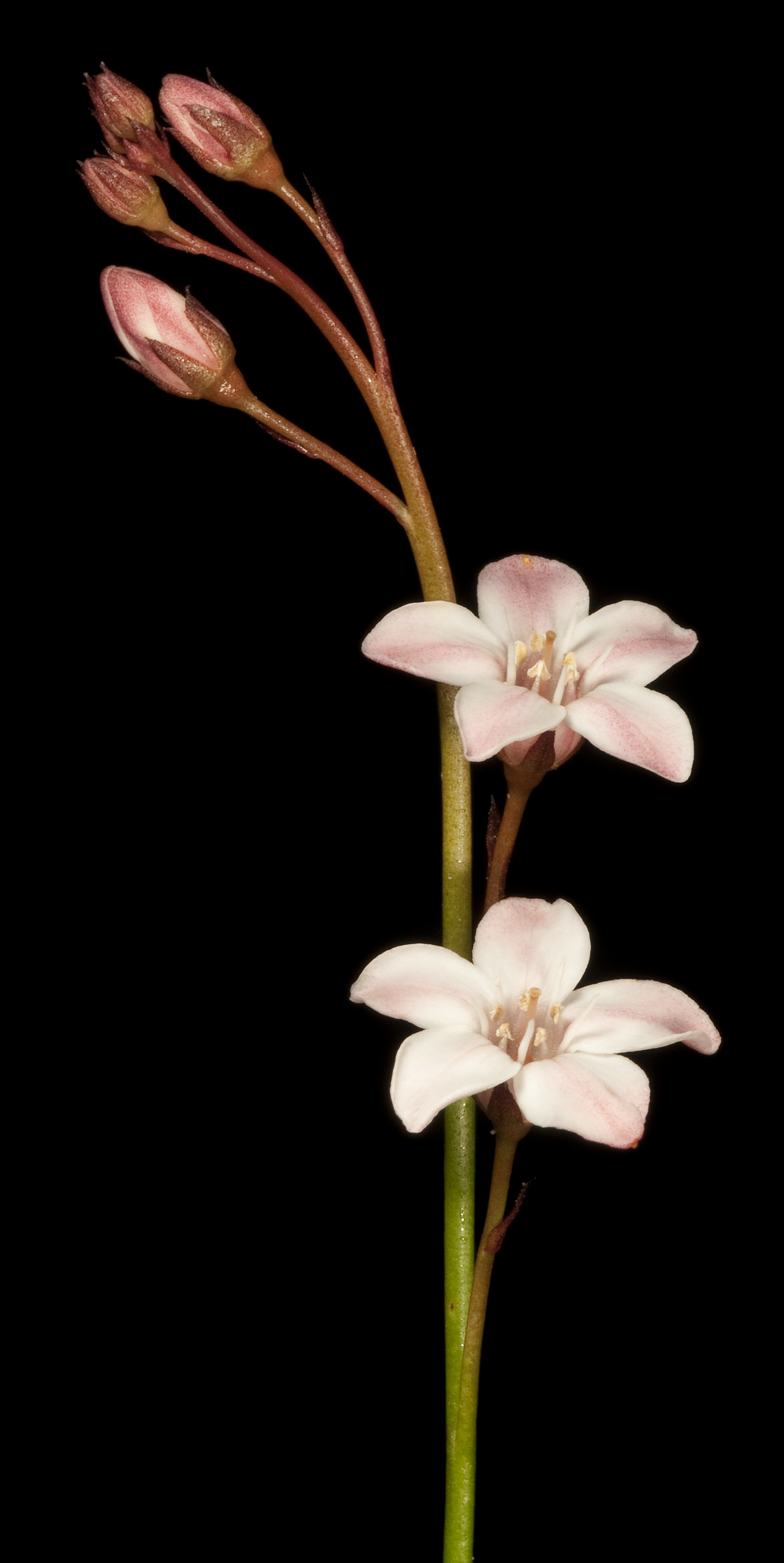

Scientific classification
- Kingdom: Plantae
- Clade: Tracheophytes
- Clade: Angiosperms
- Clade: Eudicots
- Clade: Asterids
- Order: Ericales
- Family: Primulaceae
- Genus: Samolus
- Species: S. junceus

Binomial name
- Samolus junceus R.Br.

= Samolus junceus =

Species of flowering plant

Samolus junceus in the family Primulaceae is a species of water pimpernel native to Western Australia.

== Description ==
Samolus junceus is an erect or straggling, perennial herb, which grows from 15 cm to 120 cm high, and is almost leafless. Its flowers are white/pink, and may be seen from September to December or January to April. It grows in wet places on sandy, peaty and clayey soils.

== Taxonomy ==
The species was first described by Robert Brown in 1810. There are no synonyms.
