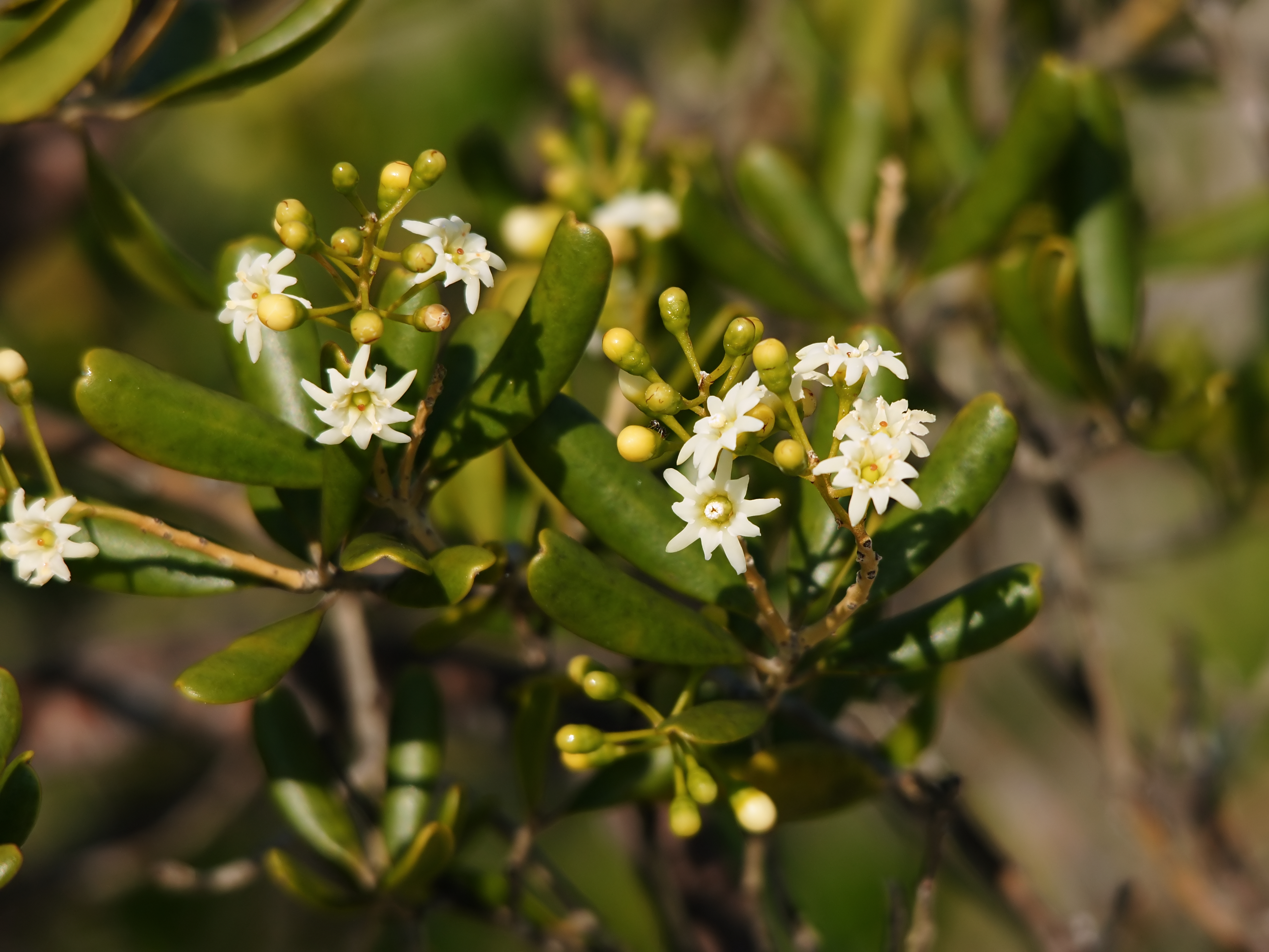

Conservation status
- Least Concern (IUCN 3.1)

- Apparently Secure (NatureServe)

Scientific classification
- Kingdom: Plantae
- Clade: Embryophytes
- Clade: Tracheophytes
- Clade: Angiosperms
- Clade: Eudicots
- Clade: Asterids
- Order: Ericales
- Family: Primulaceae
- Genus: Jacquinia
- Species: J. keyensis

Binomial name
- Jacquinia keyensis Mez

Synonyms
- Heterotypic Synonyms: Jacquinia keyensis var. minutifolia Correll

= Jacquinia keyensis =

Species of flowering plant

Jacquinia keyensis is a species of flowering plant in the primrose family Primulaceae. It is sometimes referred to by the common name Joewood. It is native to the West Indies, where it is widespread on many islands. Its natural habitat is coastal strand, often on coral exposures with salt spray.

It is a woody shrub or small tree with thick, saponaceous, evergreen leaves. It produces white flowers, primarily in the summer and fall.

Jacquinia keyensis is listed as "Threatened" in the state of Florida.
