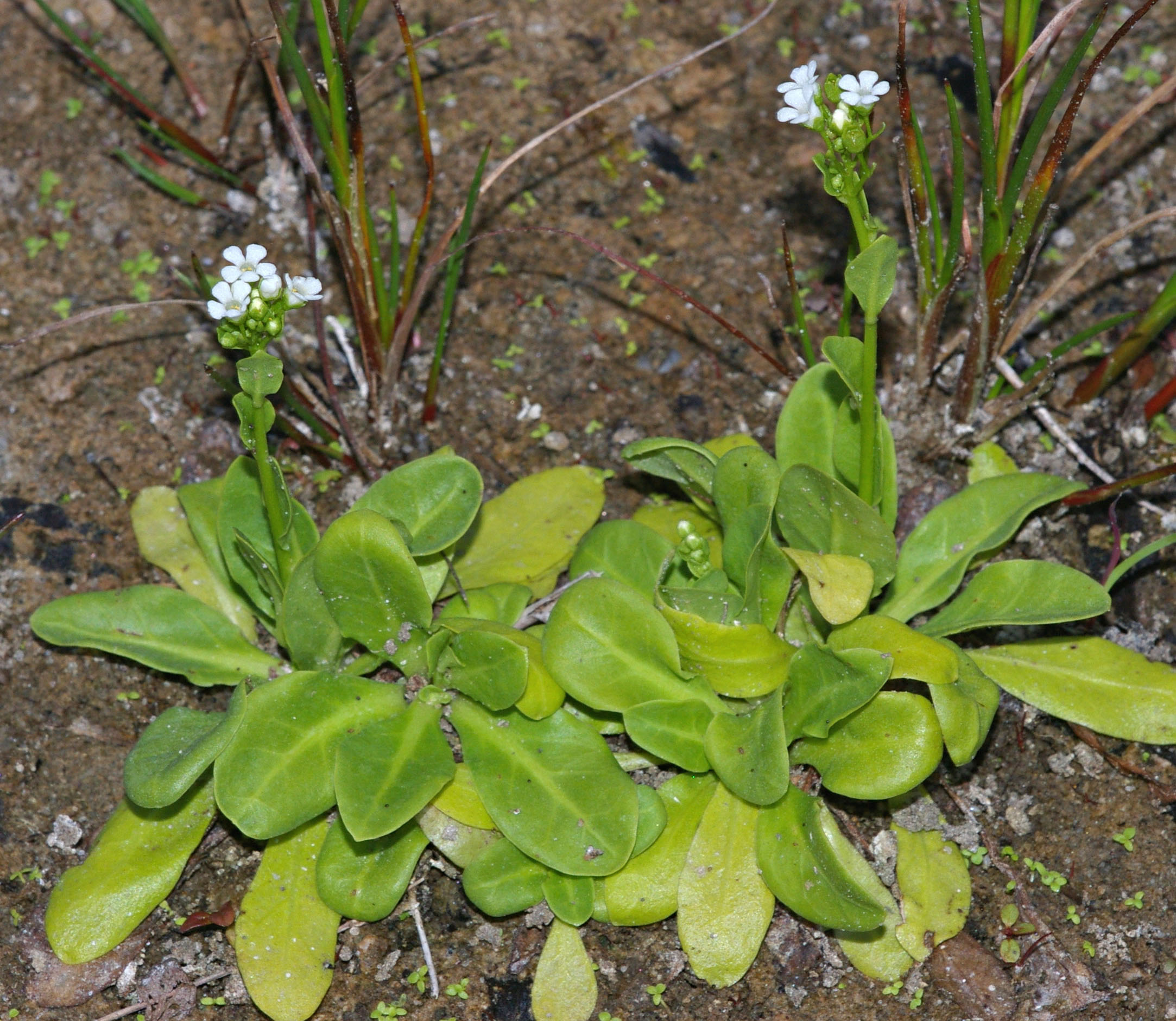

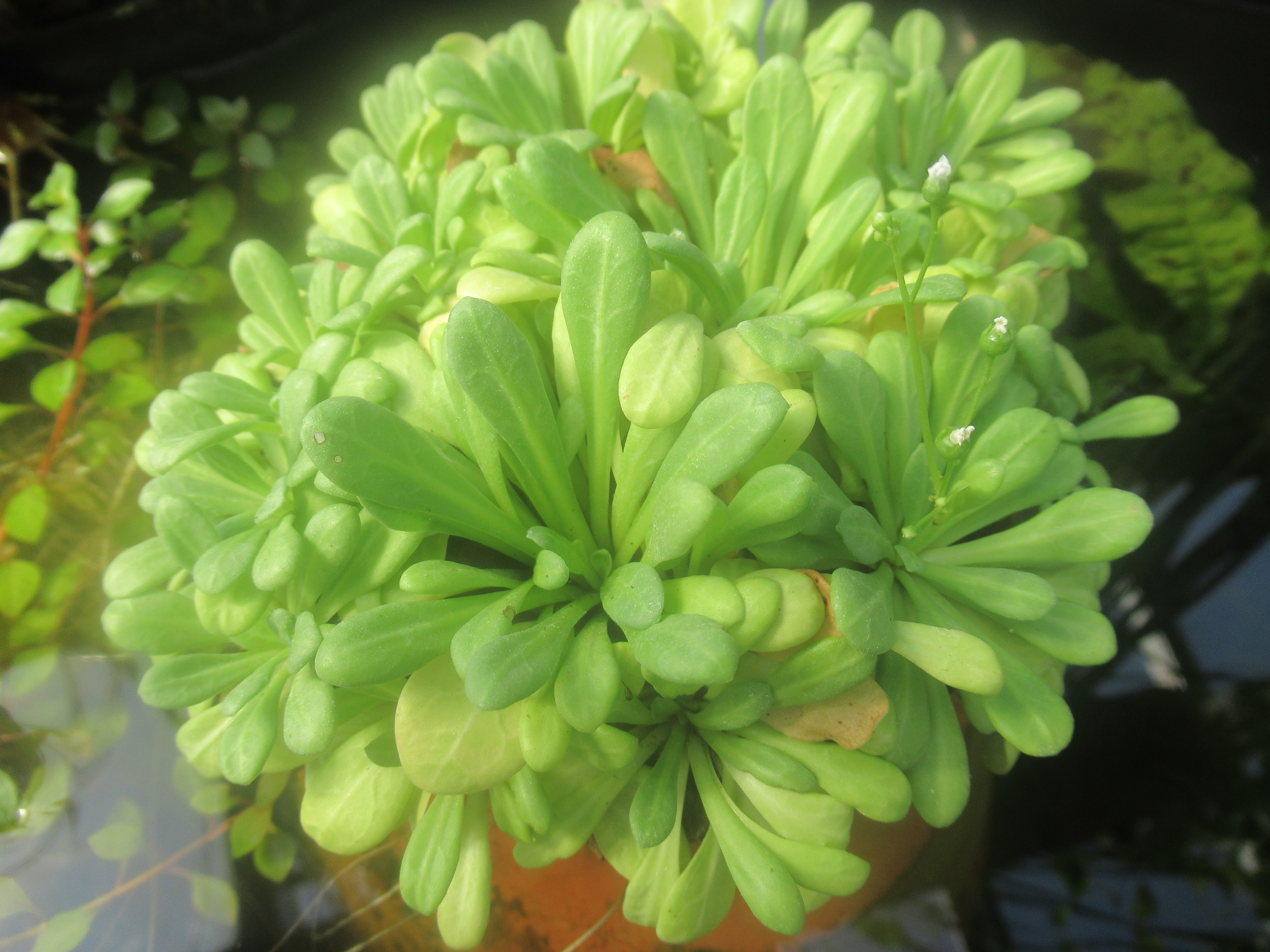

Conservation status
- Least Concern (IUCN 3.1)

Scientific classification
- Kingdom: Plantae
- Clade: Tracheophytes
- Clade: Angiosperms
- Clade: Eudicots
- Clade: Asterids
- Order: Ericales
- Family: Primulaceae
- Genus: Samolus
- Species: S. valerandi

Binomial name
- Samolus valerandi L.

Synonyms
- Synonymy: Anagallis aquatica Endl. ex Ledeb.; A. maritima J.G.Gmel.; Samolus americanus Spreng.; S. aquaticus Lam.; S. beccabunga-facies Gilib.; S. bracteatus Stokes; S. caulescens Willd. ex Roem. & Schult.; S. floribundus H.B.K.; S. geniculatus Dulac; S. parviflorus Raf.; S. vagans Greene; S. valerandi ssp. parviflorus (Raf.) Hultén; S. valerandi var. americanus (Spreng.) Gray; S. valerandi var. floribundus (H.B.K.) Britt., Sterns & Poggenb.; S. valerandi var. succulentus O.Kuntze; S. valerandi var. typicus R.Knuth

= Samolus valerandi =

Species of flowering plant in the primrose family

Samolus valerandi is a species of semi-aquatic flowering plant in the primrose family, Primulaceae. Common names include seaside brookweed, brookweed, thin-leaf brookweed, water cabbage and water rose.

== Description ==
It is a small perennial, growing to around 35 cm (13.8 inches) high. Its inflorescence is a raceme, with small white flowers on long stalks. Its corollas have five lobes. It can produce flowers throughout the growing season, from spring to fall. Its fruits are capsules that are green and globose.

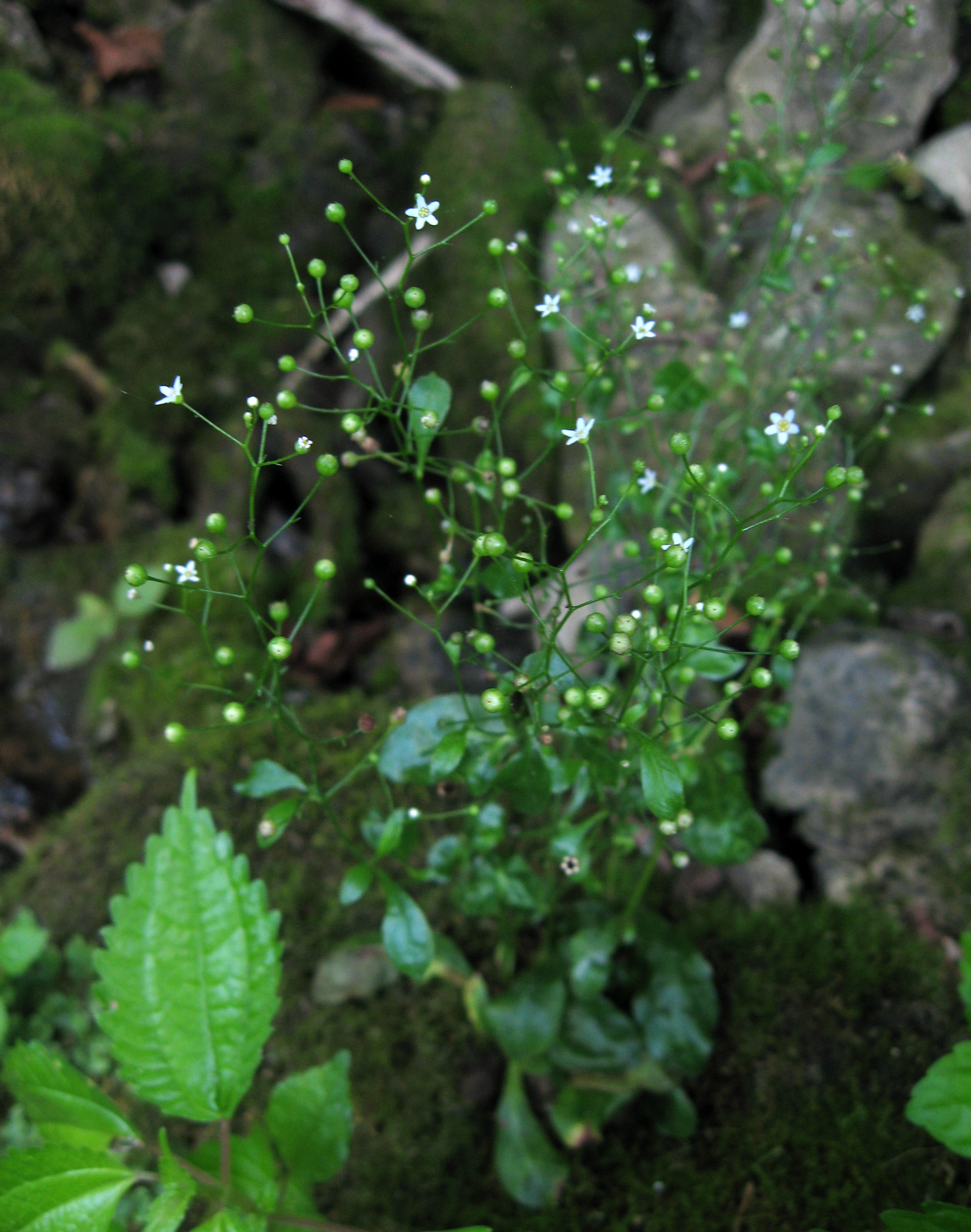
Mature inflorescences are widely spreading, with fruits on long stalks.

== Taxonomy ==
Although some floras recognize the North American populations of S. valerandi as a separate species (S. parviflorus) or subspecies (S. valerandi ssp. parviflorus), a 2012 investigation based on molecular and morphological data indicated that S. vagans and S. parviflorus should not be regarded as separate species but as part of a widespread "S. valerandi species complex".

== Distribution ==
Samolus valerandi is widely distributed across western and Mediterranean Europe, north Africa, Asia and Australia, Central and South America including Cuba, and Japan.

== Ecological aspects ==
This species is found in a variety of wet habitats, including stream banks, tidal marshes, and seeps. It can be found in both degraded and intact natural communities.

== Cultivation ==
The plant can be grown in ponds, bog gardens, and damp areas in the garden. S. valerandi prefers light (sandy), medium (loamy), and heavy (clay) soils, preferably neutral or basic (alkaline) soils. It can tolerate both shade and a bright, sunny position. It requires moist or wet soil and can even grow in water. The plant can tolerate maritime exposure and is self-fertile. S. valerandi is sometimes grown in aquariums, although they seem to last only a limited time when grown fully submersed.

=== Uses ===
The plant's leaves, when cut and agitated in water, produce a lather, for which reason in Palestine it has been used by the local Arab population, in former times, to launder clothes and was called by them sabūn 'arab (= Arab soap).
