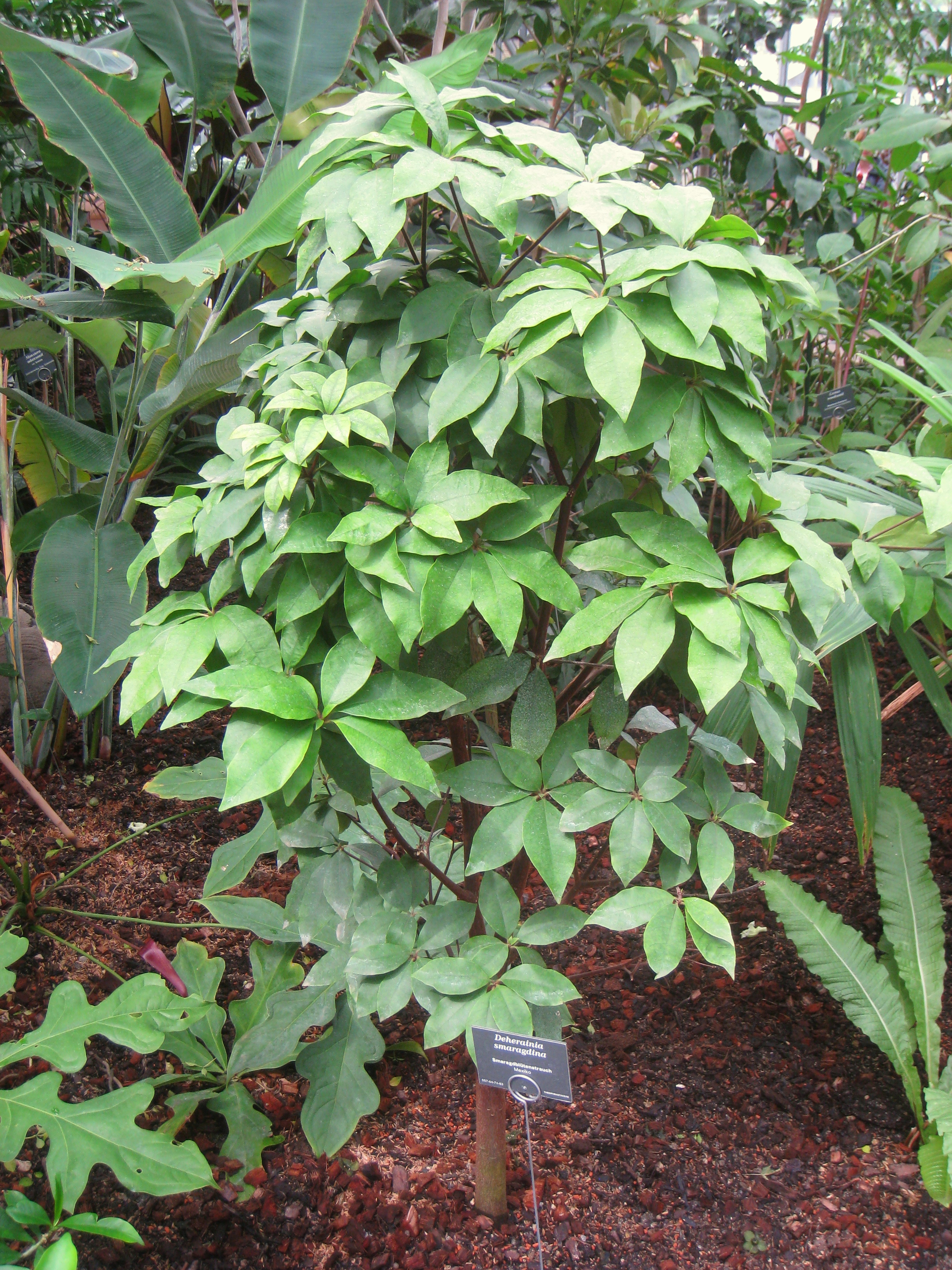

Conservation status
- Vulnerable (IUCN 3.1)

Scientific classification
- Kingdom: Plantae
- Clade: Tracheophytes
- Clade: Angiosperms
- Clade: Eudicots
- Clade: Asterids
- Order: Ericales
- Family: Primulaceae
- Genus: Deherainia
- Species: D. smaragdina

Binomial name
- Deherainia smaragdina (Planch. ex Linden) Decne.

Synonyms
- Jacquinia smaragdina Planch. ex Linden

= Deherainia smaragdina =

Species of flowering plant

Deherainia smaragdina is a species of shrub in the family Primulaceae. It is native to Honduras, Guatemala, Belize, and Mexico, and notable for its green flowers and unpleasant smell. Its common names in Spanish and English, flor de la muerte and flower of death, respectively, refer to its treatment for people who have a terminal illness but "are afraid to die".

== Gallery of the green flowers ==
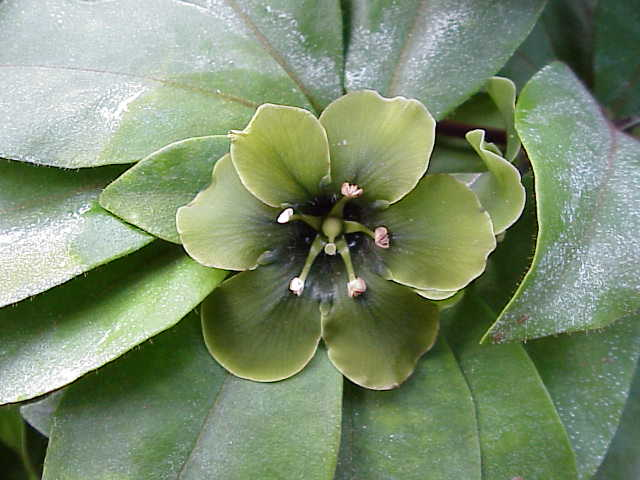

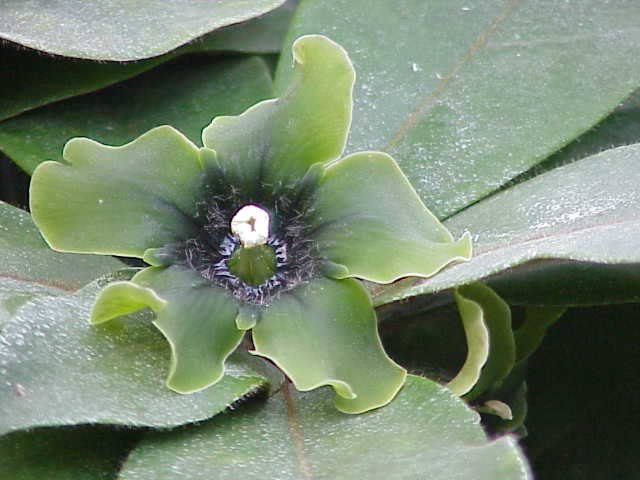

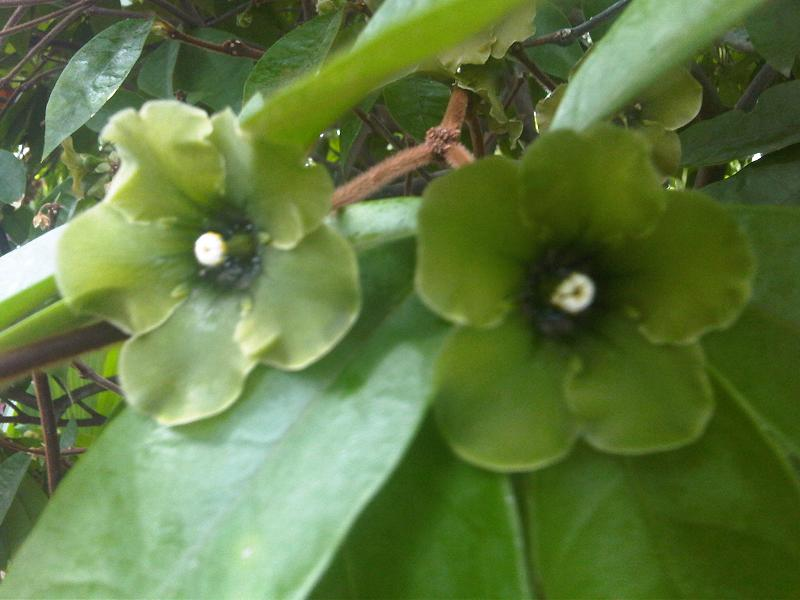

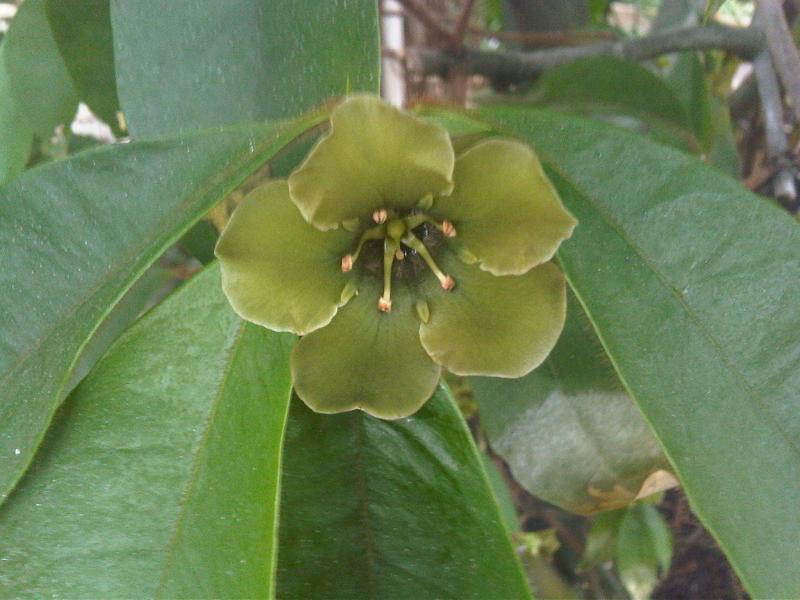

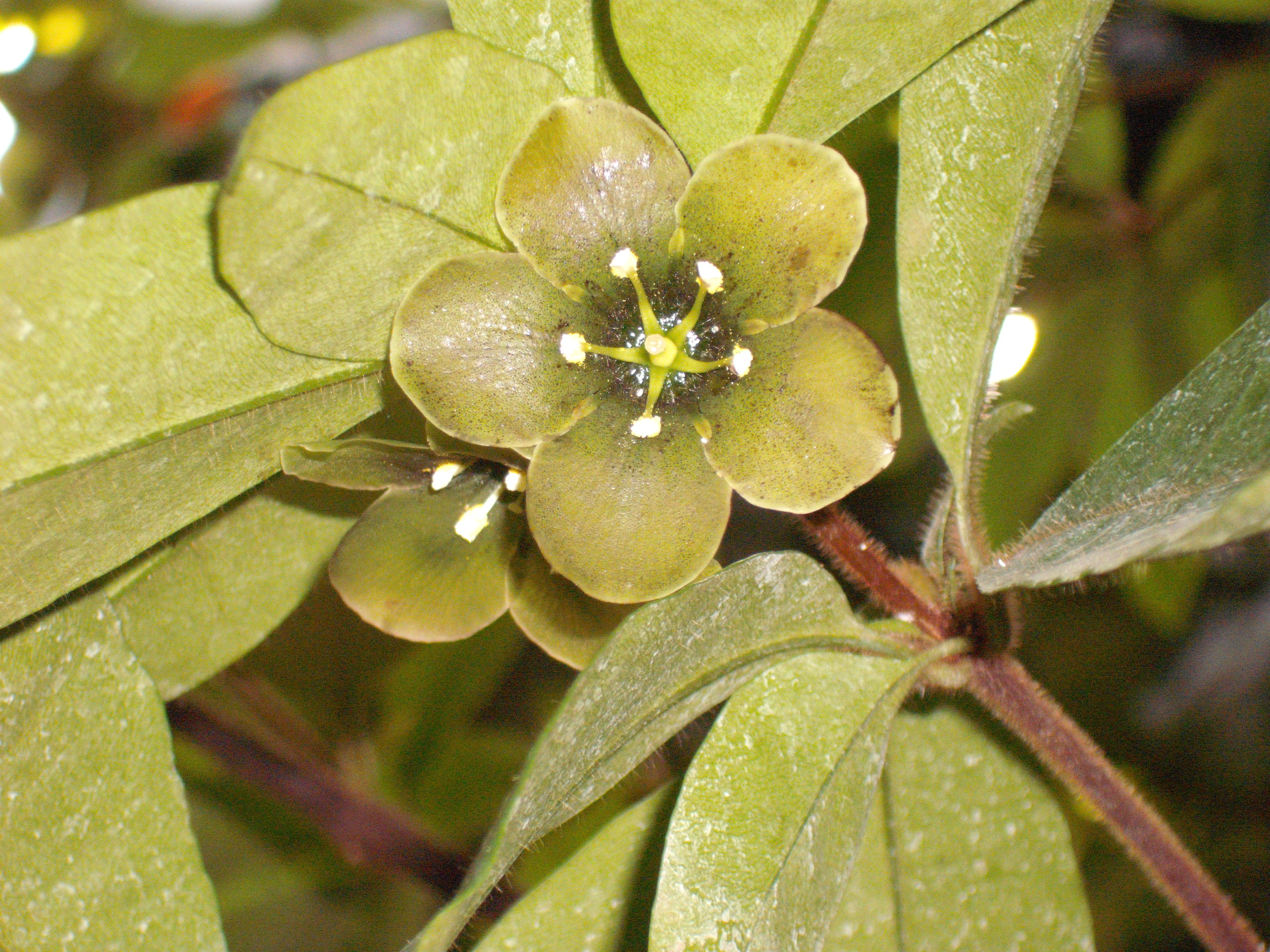

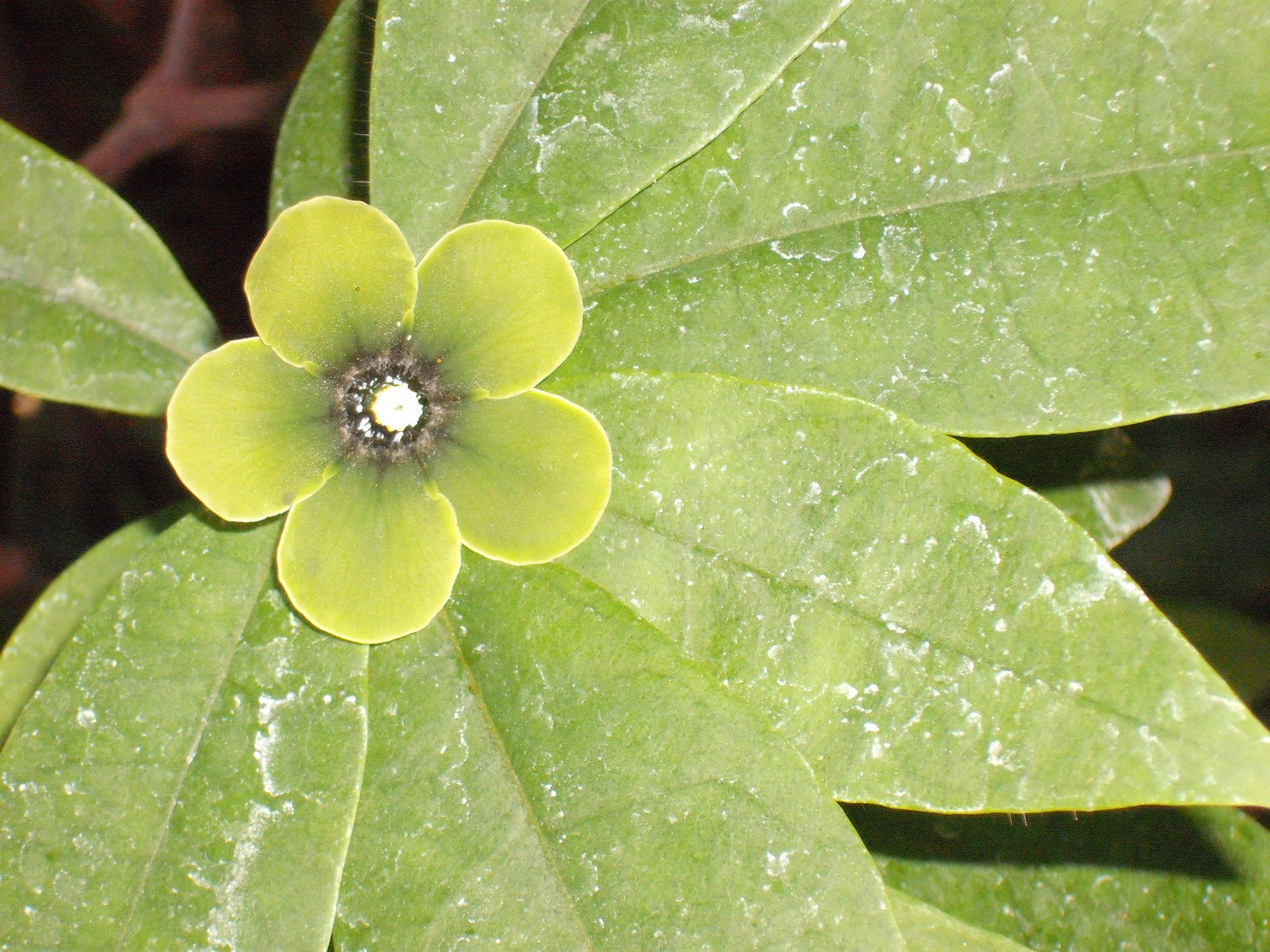
