= Jacquinia pungens =

- J. pungens flowers

Scientific classification
- Kingdom: Plantae
- Clade: Tracheophytes
- Clade: Angiosperms
- Clade: Eudicots
- Clade: Asterids
- Order: Ericales
- Family: Primulaceae
- Genus: Jacquinia
- Species: J. pungens

Binomial name
- Jacquinia pungens A.Gray

Species of flowering plant

Jacquinia pungens (syn. Jacquinia macrocarpa subsp. pungens) is a species of flowering plant in the family Primulaceae, native to southern Mexico. It is a shrub growing to 4 m tall, with lanceolate to oblong evergreen leaves 4–7 cm long, with a sharply pointed apex. The flowers are yellow, orange, or red, produced in tight racemes. The fruit is a yellow berry.

== Images ==
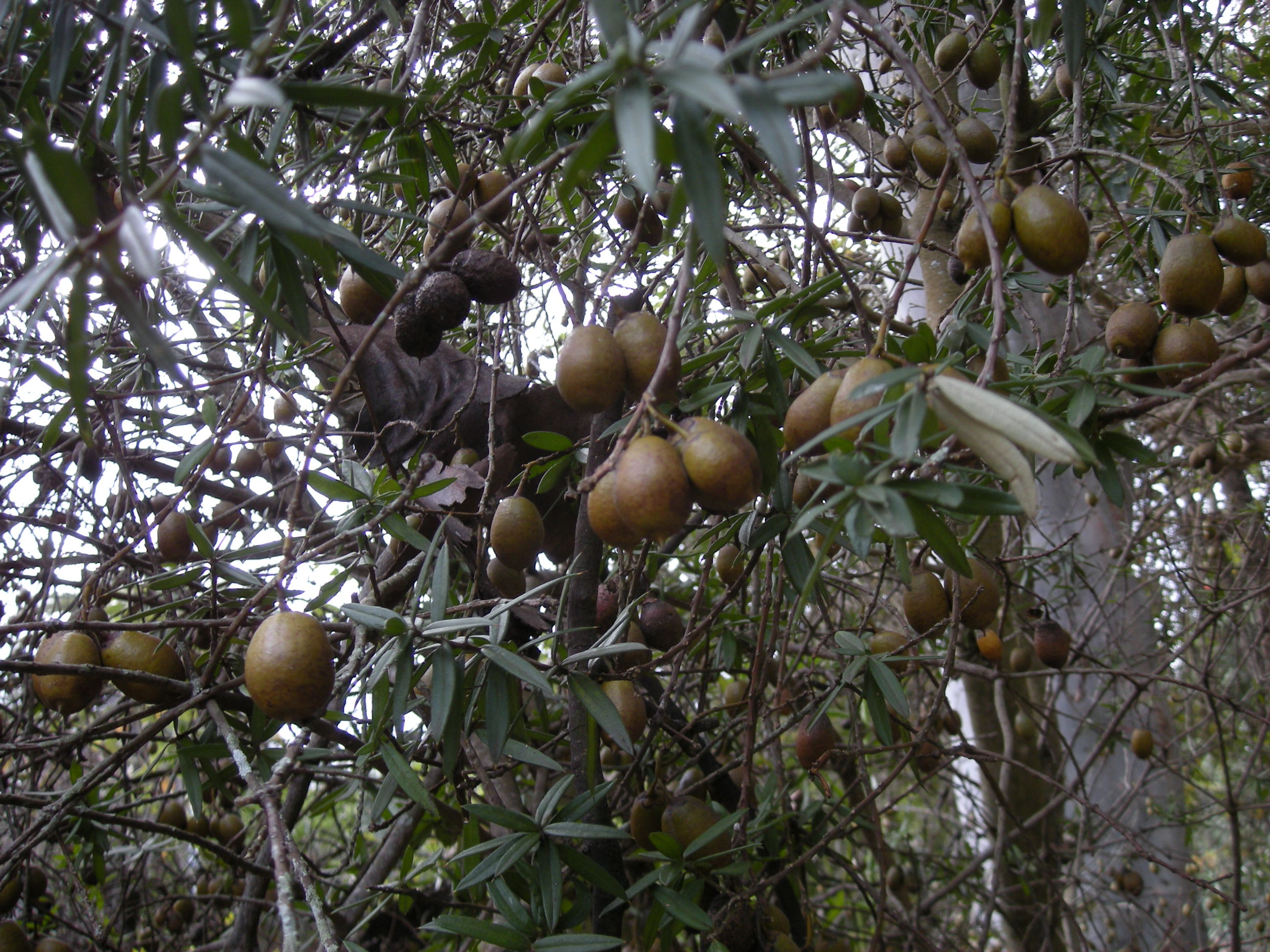
J. pungens fruit.
