= Neomezia =

Scientific classification
- Kingdom: Plantae
- Clade: Tracheophytes
- Clade: Angiosperms
- Clade: Eudicots
- Clade: Asterids
- Order: Ericales
- Family: Primulaceae
- Genus: Neomezia; Votsch
- Species: N. cubensis

Binomial name
- Neomezia cubensis (Radlk.) Votsch

Subspecies
- Neomezia cubensis subsp. oligospinosa (Lepper) Borhidi
- It is endemic to Cuba

Synonyms
- Deherainia cubensis (Radlk.) Mez; Theophrasta cubensis Radlk.

Genus of plants

Neomezia is a monotypic genus of flowering plants belonging to the family Primulaceae endemic to Cuba, which only contains one known species, Neomezia cubensis (Radlk.) Votsch.

== Description ==
Neomezia is a dwarf shrub that is 0.3–0.5 metres (1 ft 0 in – 1 ft 8 in) tall.

== Taxonomy ==
It was published by Oskar Hermann Wilhelm Votsch in 1904.

=== Subspecies ===
It has an accepted subspecies, Neomezia cubensis subsp. oligospinosa (Lepper) Borhidi which is native to north-western Cuba.

=== Etymology ===
The genus name of Neomezia is in honour of Carl Christian Mez (1866–1944), a German botanist and university professor. The Latin specific epithet of cubensis means "of Cuba" (where the plant was found).

== Habitat ==
It occurs in deciduous forests on limestone.
