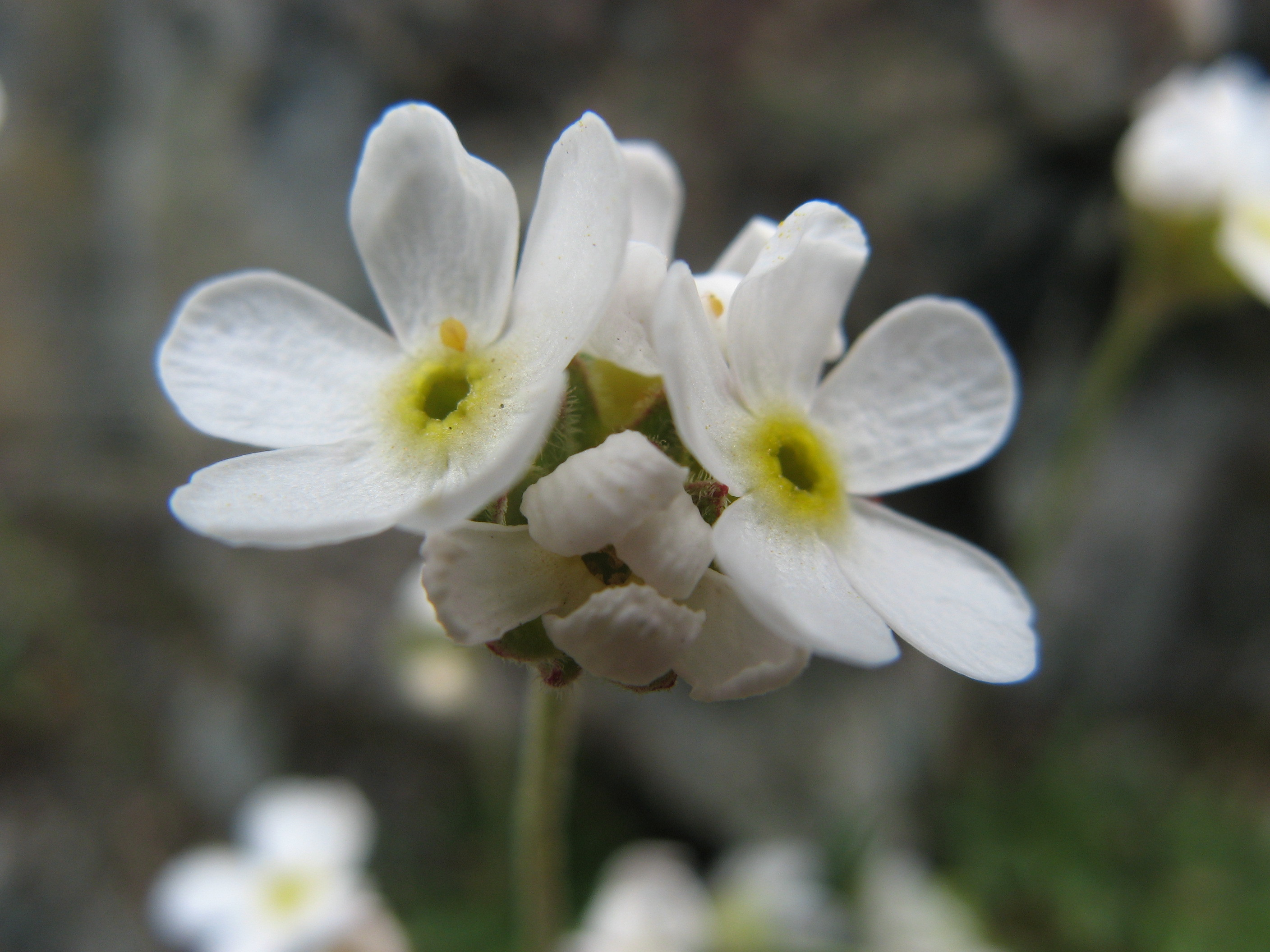
- Androsace albana

Scientific classification
- Kingdom: Plantae
- Clade: Embryophytes
- Clade: Tracheophytes
- Clade: Angiosperms
- Clade: Eudicots
- Clade: Asterids
- Order: Ericales
- Family: Primulaceae
- Subfamily: Primuloideae

Type genus
- Primula L.

= Primuloideae =

Subfamily of primrose family of flowering plants

Primuloideae is a subfamily of the family Primulaceae in the order Ericales. Formerly it represented the Primulaceae family (Primulaceae s.s.), before the latter was enlarged (Primulaceae s.l.) by addition of three other closely related families that formerly represented the order Primulales.

Subfamily is characterised by scapose inflorescences, distinctly tubular flowers having campanulate or hypocrateriform corolla, imbricate corolla aestivation, isodiametric corolla epidermal cells, leaves almost always forming a basal rosette and ovules rarely immersed in the placenta. In addition they often have syncolpate or sometimes polycolpate pollen, without margo.

== Genera ==
- Androsace L. (synonym: Douglasia, Pomatosace, Vitaliana)
- Bryocarpum Hook. f. & Thomson
- Dionysia Fenzl
- Evotrochis Raf.
- Hottonia Boehr. ex L.
- Kaufmannia Regel
- Omphalogramma Franch.
- Primula L. (synonym: Dodecatheon)
- Soldanella L.
