= Houttuyn =

Houttuyn is a surname. Notable people with the surname include:

- Petrus Houttuyn (1648–1709), Dutch botanist and medic
- Martinus Houttuyn (1720–1798), Dutch naturalist

== See also ==
- Houttuynia, a genus of plants named for Martinus Houttuyn
