= Evotrochis =

Scientific classification
- Kingdom: Plantae
- Clade: Tracheophytes
- Clade: Angiosperms
- Clade: Eudicots
- Clade: Asterids
- Order: Ericales
- Family: Primulaceae
- Subfamily: Primuloideae
- Genus: Evotrochis; Raf. (1837)

Species
- Evotrochis davisii (W.W.Sm.) Fırat; Evotrochis edelbergii (O.Schwarz) Fırat & Lidén; Evotrochis floribunda (Wall.) Fırat & Lidén; Evotrochis gaubaeana (Bornm.) Fırat & Lidén; Evotrochis involucrata Raf.; Evotrochis simensis (Hochst.) Fırat & Lidén; Evotrochis verticillata (Forssk.) Fırat & Lidén

Genus of flowering plants

Evotrochis is a genus of flowering plants in the primula family, Primulaceae. It includes seven species of perennial plants native to western Asia and northeastern Africa, ranging from southeastern Turkey to Nepal, and to the southern Sinai Peninsula, the southwestern Arabian Peninsula, and the Horn of Africa.

== Species ==
Seven species are accepted.

- Evotrochis davisii (W.W.Sm.) Fırat – southeastern Turkey
- Evotrochis edelbergii (O.Schwarz) Fırat & Lidén – northeastern Afghanistan
- Evotrochis floribunda (Wall.) Fırat & Lidén – northeastern Afghanistan to western Nepal
- Evotrochis gaubaeana (Bornm.) Fırat & Lidén – western and central Iran
- Evotrochis involucrata Raf. – Sinai Peninsula (Mount Catherine)
- Evotrochis simensis (Hochst.) Fırat & Lidén – Eritrea and Ethiopia
- Evotrochis verticillata (Forssk.) Fırat & Lidén – northern Somalia and southwestern Arabian Peninsula
