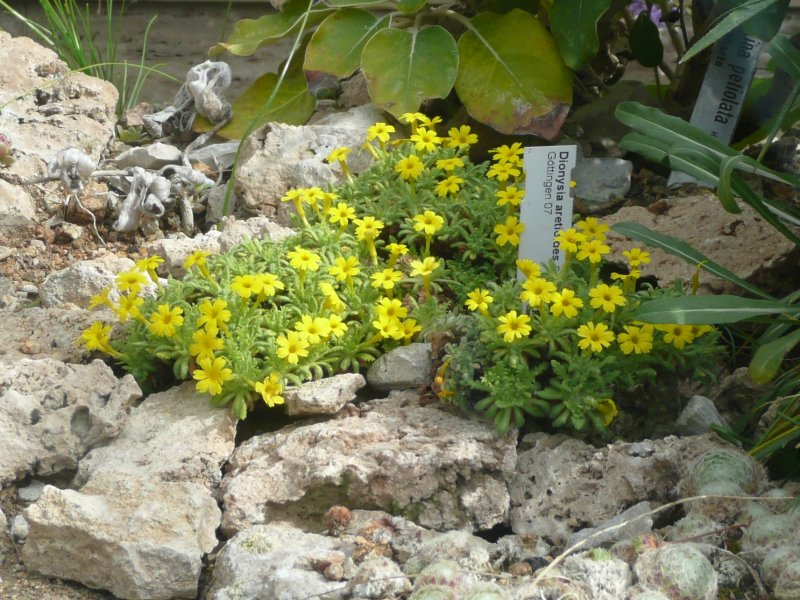

Scientific classification
- Kingdom: Plantae
- Clade: Embryophytes
- Clade: Tracheophytes
- Clade: Angiosperms
- Clade: Eudicots
- Clade: Asterids
- Order: Ericales
- Family: Primulaceae
- Genus: Dionysia
- Species: D. aretioides

Binomial name
- Dionysia aretioides (Lehm.) Boiss.

Synonyms
- Gregoria aretioides (Lehm.) Duby; Primula aretioides Lehm.; Dionysia demawendica Bornm.; Primula cespitosa Willd.

= Dionysia aretioides =

Species of flowering plant

Dionysia aretioides, the aretioid dionysia, is a species of flowering plant in the genus Dionysia within the family Primulaceae, native to the central Alborz mountains of northern Iran. It has gained the Royal Horticultural Society's Award of Garden Merit.

== Gallery ==
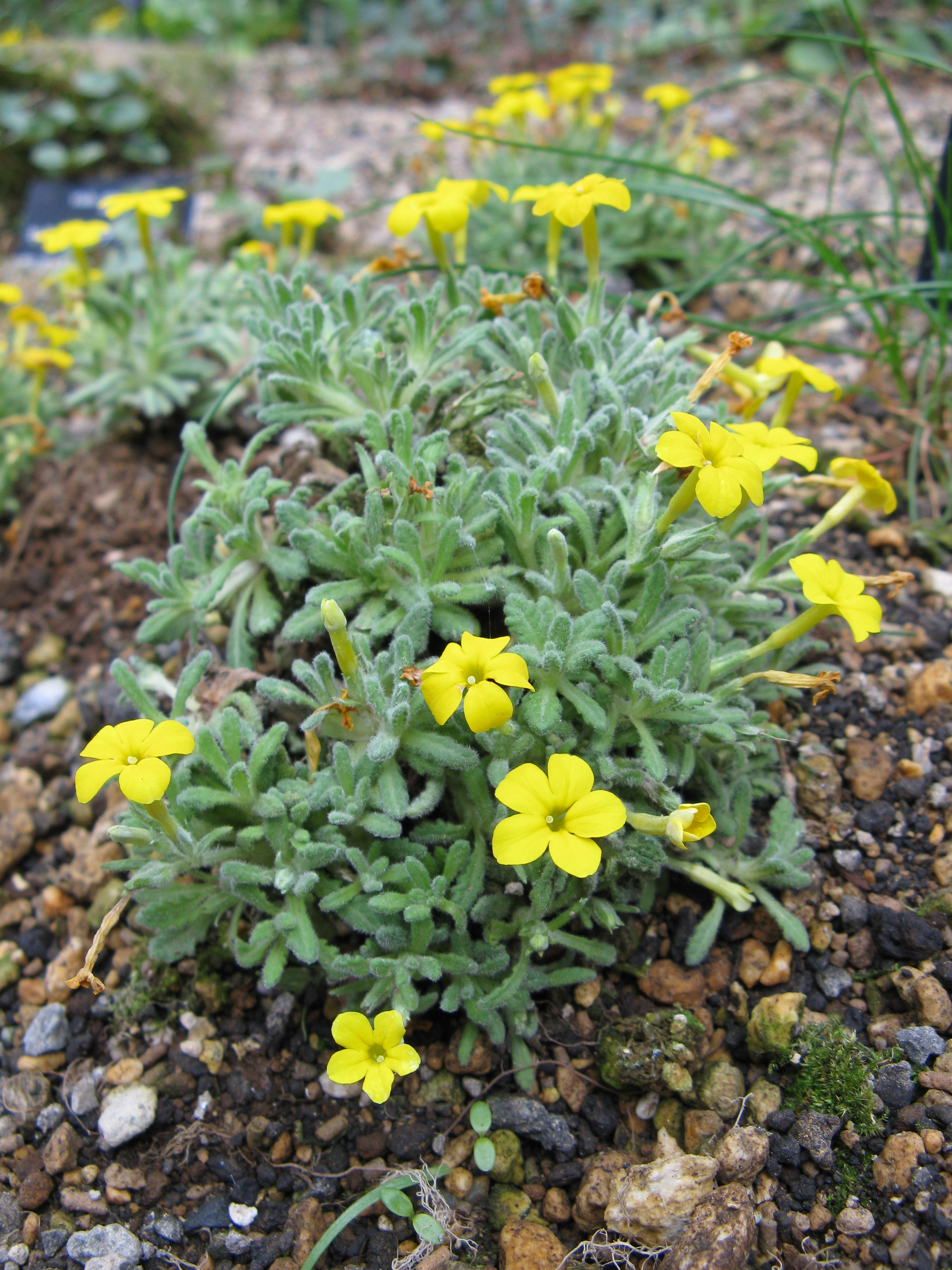

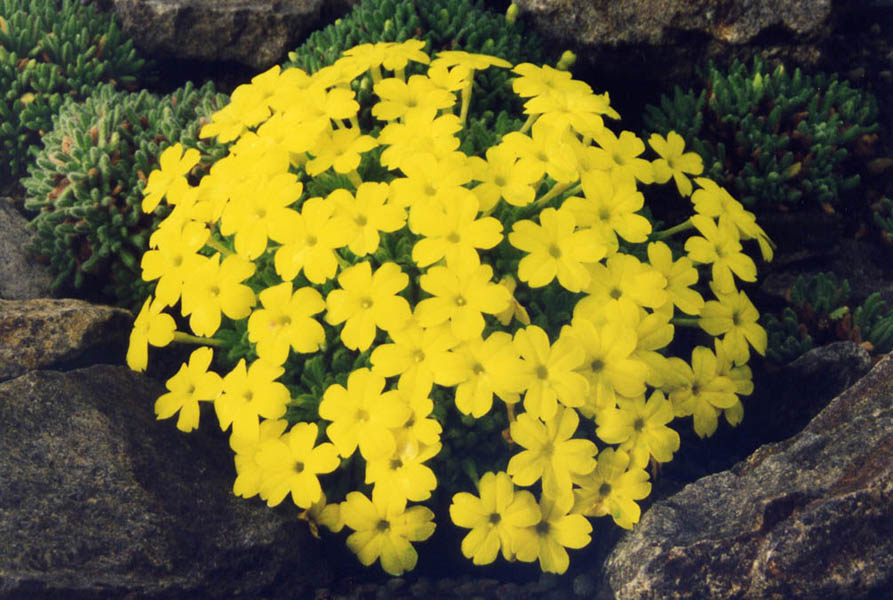

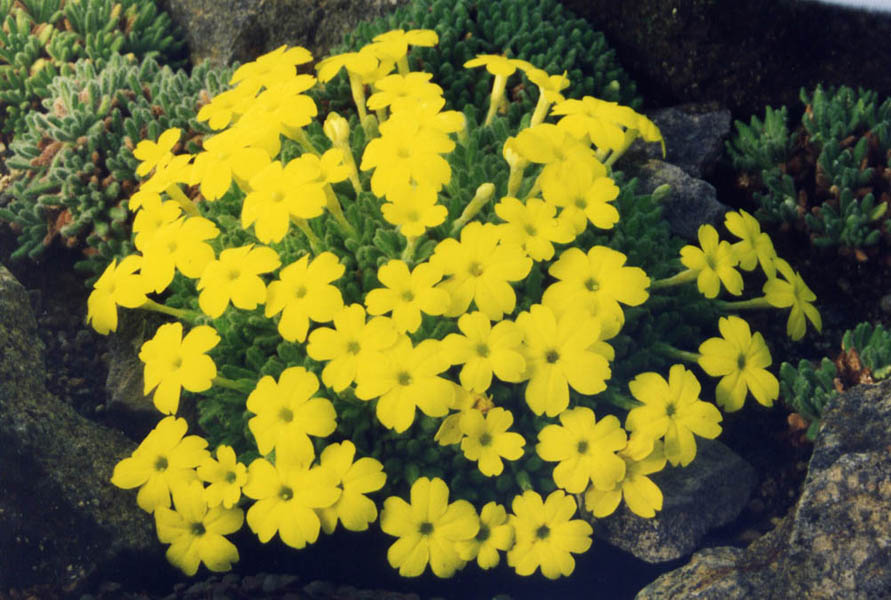

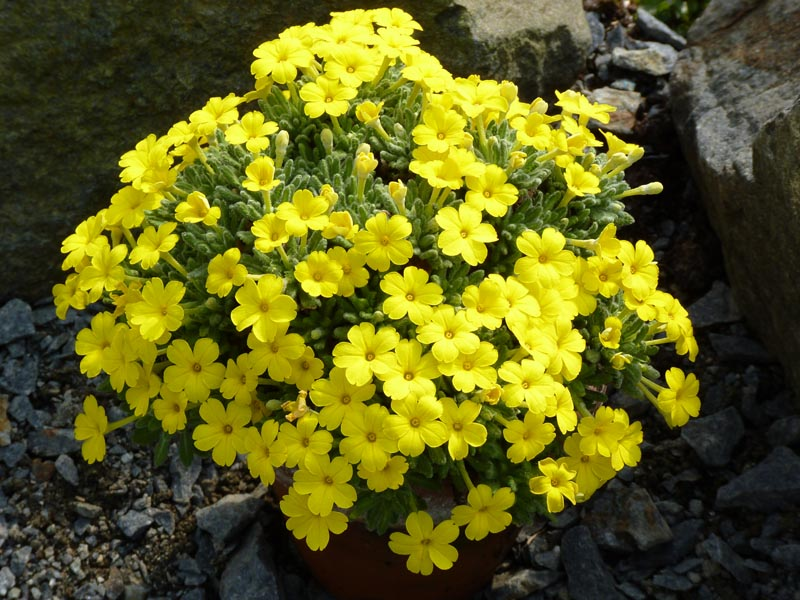

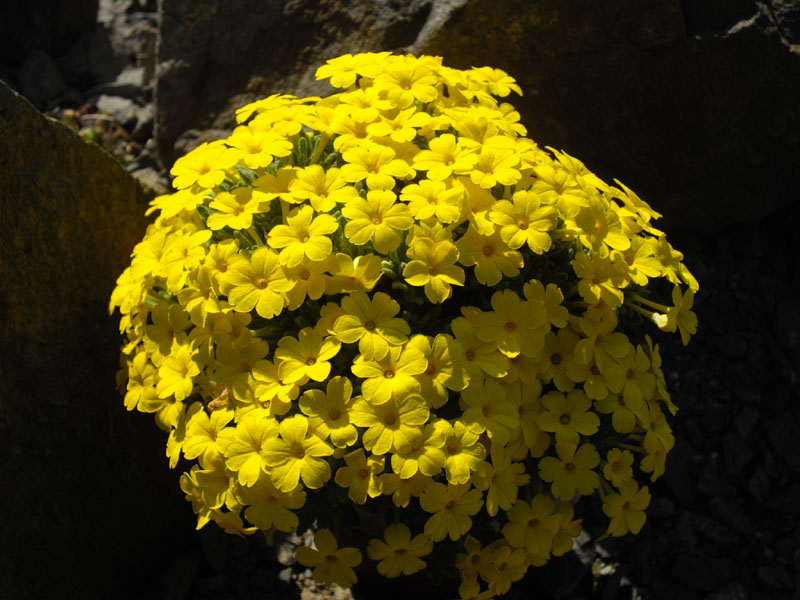

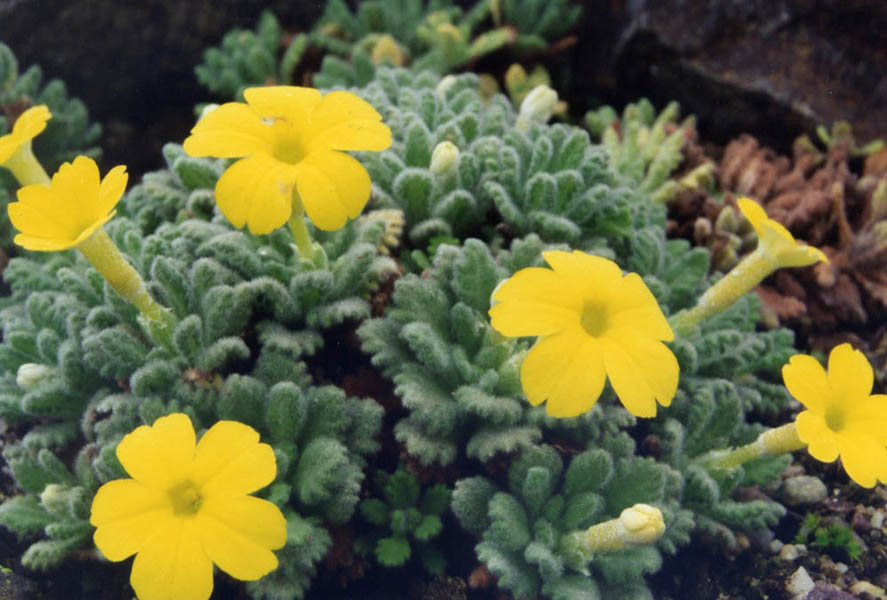

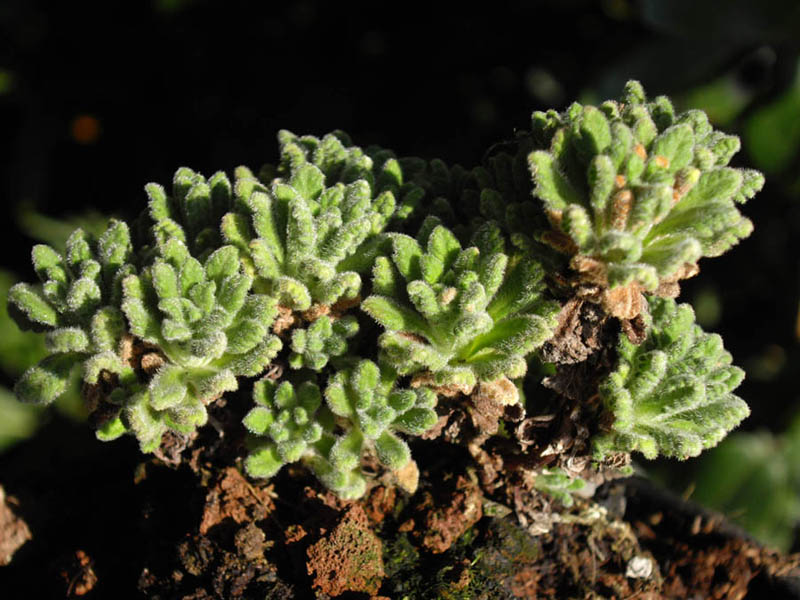
