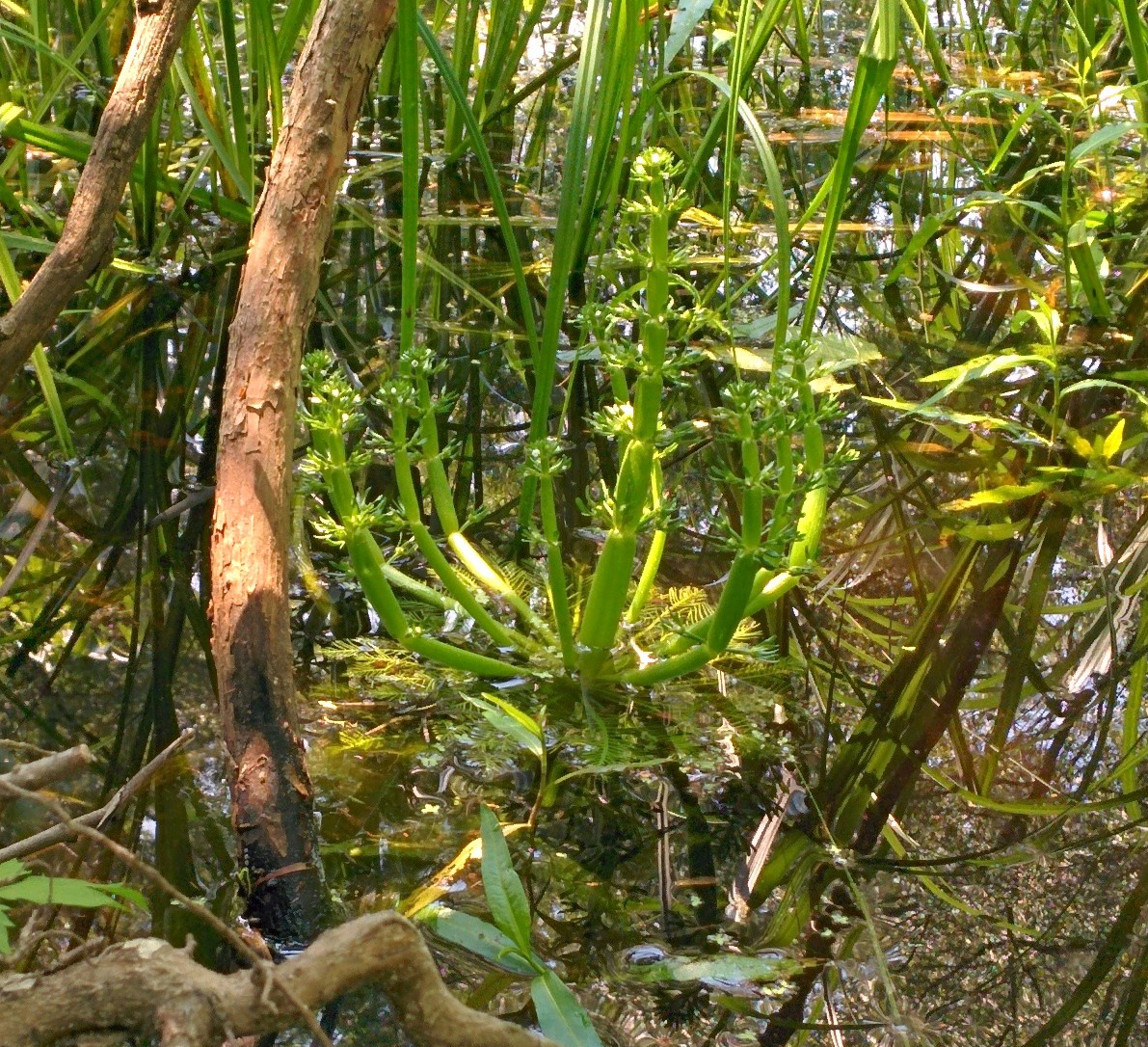
- In flower

Scientific classification
- Kingdom: Plantae
- Clade: Tracheophytes
- Clade: Angiosperms
- Clade: Eudicots
- Clade: Asterids
- Order: Ericales
- Family: Primulaceae
- Genus: Hottonia
- Species: H. inflata

Binomial name
- Hottonia inflata (Elliott)

= Hottonia inflata =

Species of aquatic plant

Hottonia inflata, the American featherfoil or featherfoil, is an aquatic plant in the family Primulaceae.

== Distribution ==
Featherfoil occurs sporadically in the eastern United States, from Texas to Maine, in the coastal plains along the Atlantic and Gulf of Mexico.

== Description ==
This aquatic wildflower has basal fibrous roots buried in the underlying mud, while thin, feather-like roots float freely in the water. The leaves are somewhat variable and can be submergent or floating. The leaves can be linear or filiform and arranged alternately, oppositely or whorled, with pinnate or bipinnate divisions. Its flowers are small and white or violet in color and are located at the end of thickly inflated flower stalks.

== Habitat ==
Featherfoil lives in swamps, ditches, and shallow ponds, including beaver ponds, with relatively stable water levels.

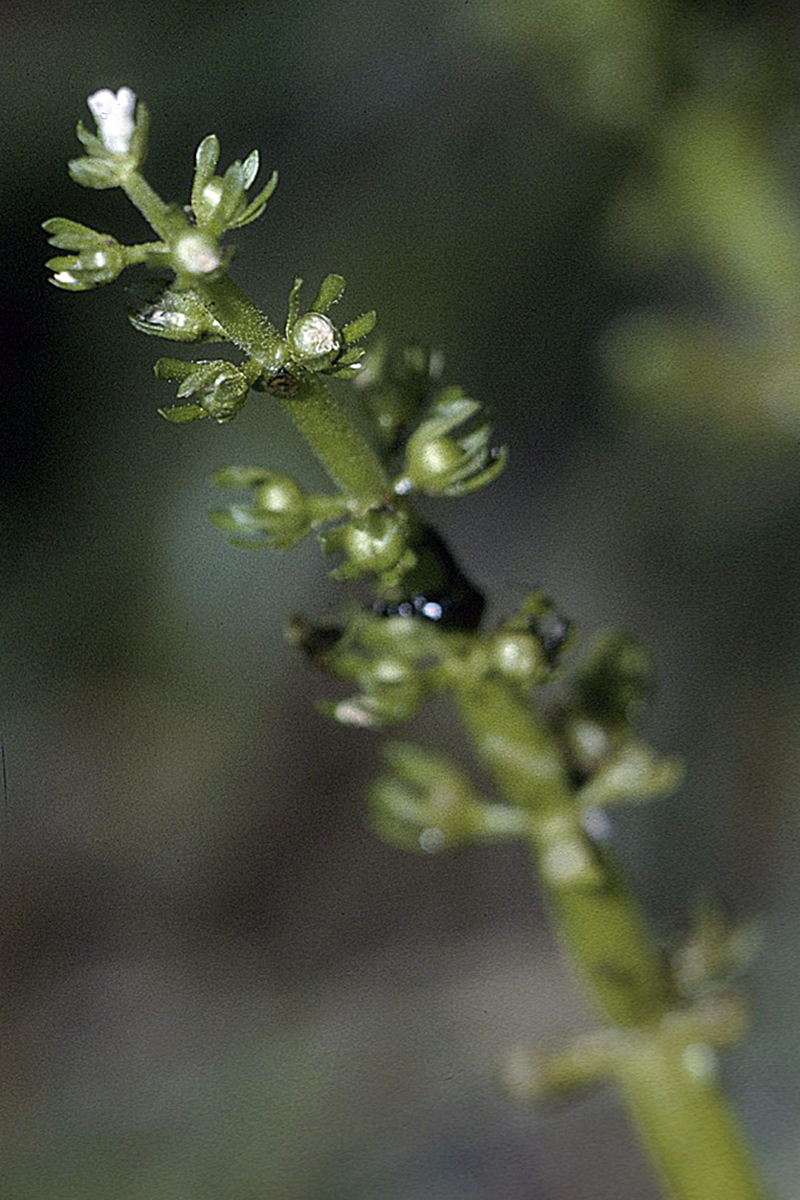
Inflorescence.
