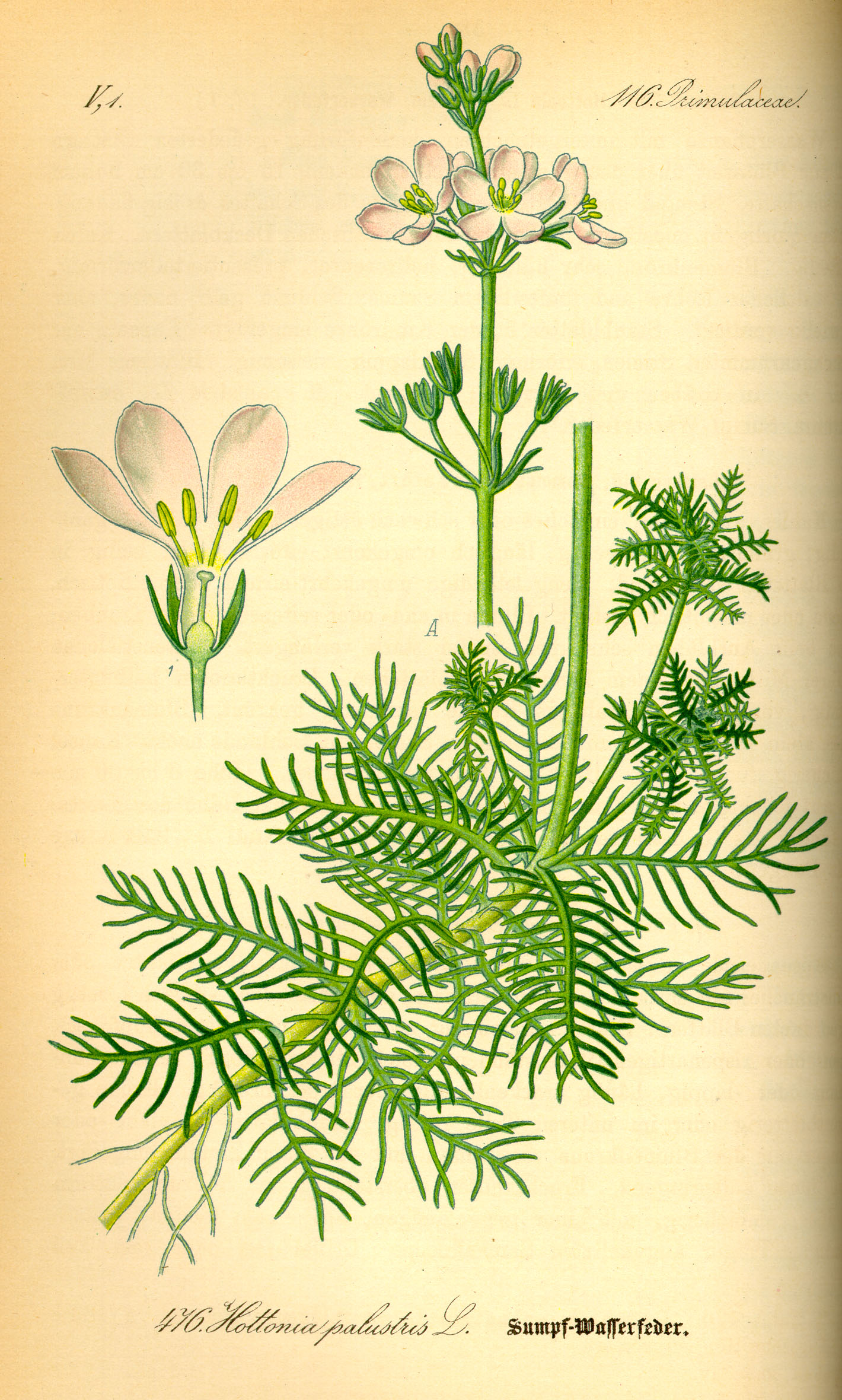

Scientific classification
- Kingdom: Plantae
- Clade: Tracheophytes
- Clade: Angiosperms
- Clade: Eudicots
- Clade: Asterids
- Order: Ericales
- Family: Primulaceae
- Genus: Hottonia
- Species: H. palustris

Binomial name
- Hottonia palustris L.

= Hottonia palustris =

Species of aquatic plant

Hottonia palustris, also water violet or featherfoil, is an aquatic plant in the family Primulaceae.

== Description ==
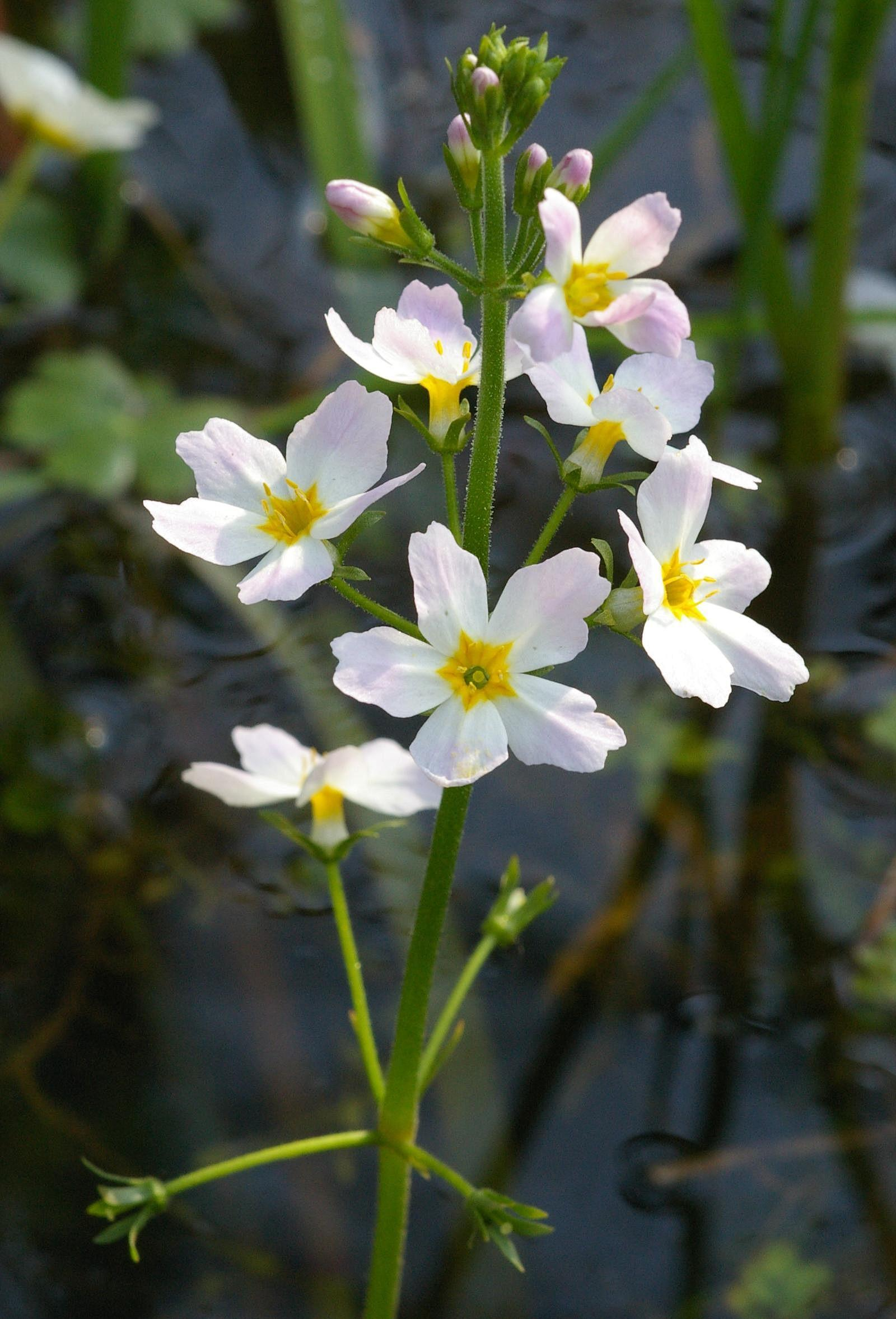
Inflorescence

The plant has a stem reaching up to 80 centimetres (30 in) in height. Its basal roots are buried in the underlying mud, while other silvery, shiny roots dangle freely in the water. The leaves are deeply divided as far as the central vein, like the teeth of a double comb, and are completely submerged, but can surface after a drastic fall in water level. The leaves are alternate or connected to the stem in more or less regular whorls. The flowers are hermaphrodite and pollinated by insects and cleistogamy; they appear from May to June. The plant is self-fertile.

== Distribution ==
Featherfoil is found in Europe and northern Asia. The species epithet palustris is Latin for "of the marsh" and indicates its common habitat.

== Cultivation ==
Naturally a bog or marsh plant, most specimens sold have been grown emersed and must be submerged in stages in the aquarium to encourage them to adapt and form submerse leaves. Featherfoil can be kept in a cool or tropical aquarium. A good substrate, light and, if possible, additional CO_{2} are beneficial. It can be grown in or around ponds, for which it is considered a good oxygenator. Its bushy leaves provide protection for fish and fry. It can grow floating as well, or exposed to sun.
