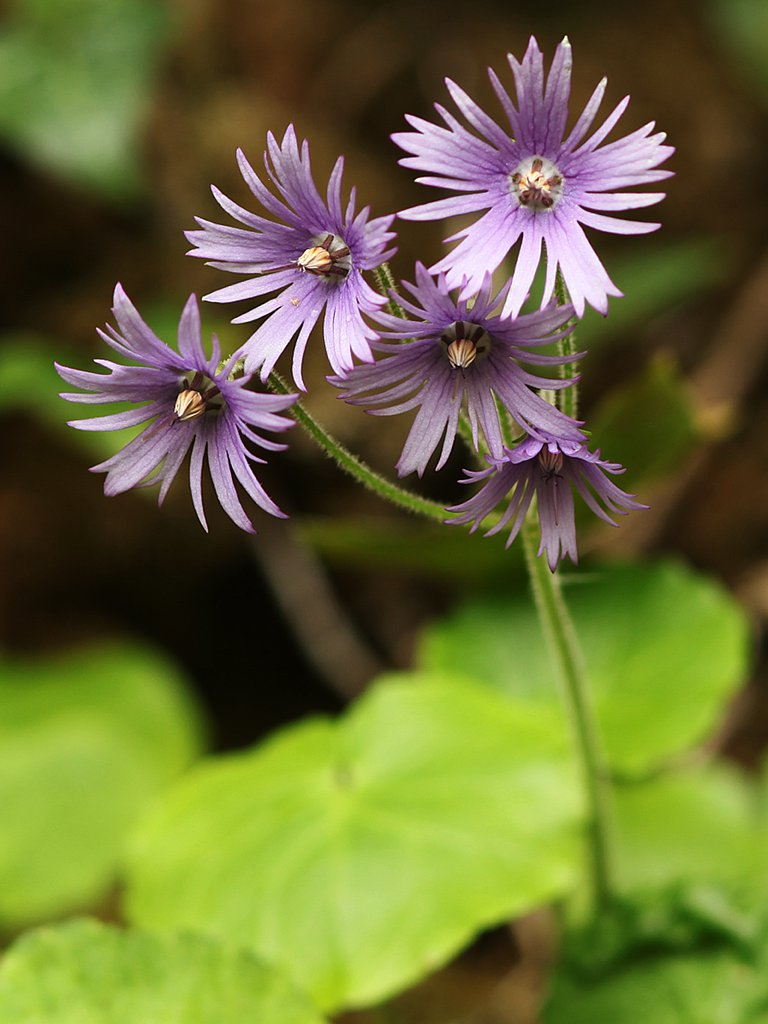
- Flowers
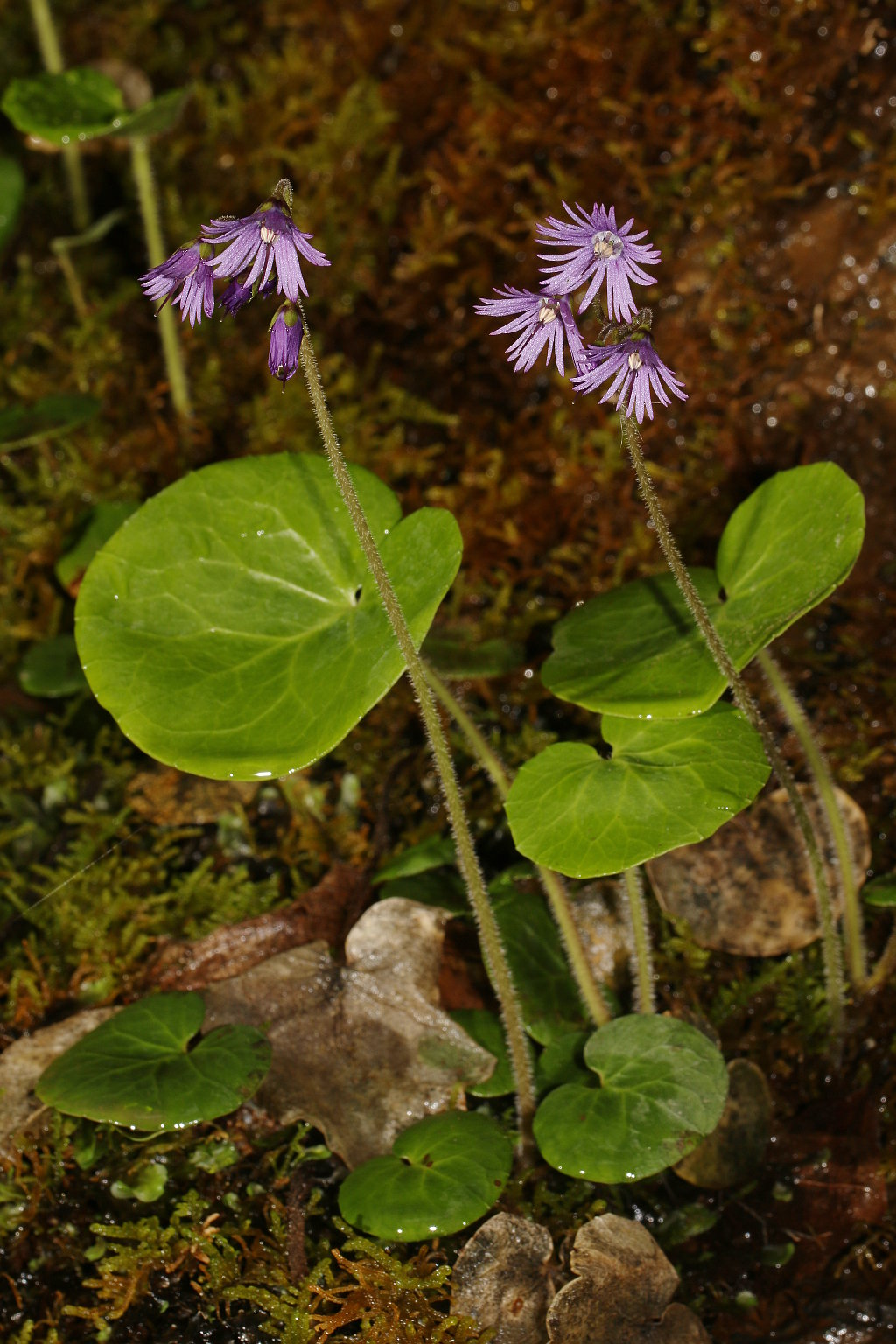
- Habit

Scientific classification
- Kingdom: Plantae
- Clade: Tracheophytes
- Clade: Angiosperms
- Clade: Eudicots
- Clade: Asterids
- Order: Ericales
- Family: Primulaceae
- Genus: Soldanella
- Species: S. villosa

Binomial name
- Soldanella villosa Darracq

= Soldanella villosa =

Species of flowering plant

Soldanella villosa is a species of flowering plant in the family Primulaceae, native to the western Pyrenees. It has gained the Royal Horticultural Society's Award of Garden Merit as an ornamental.
