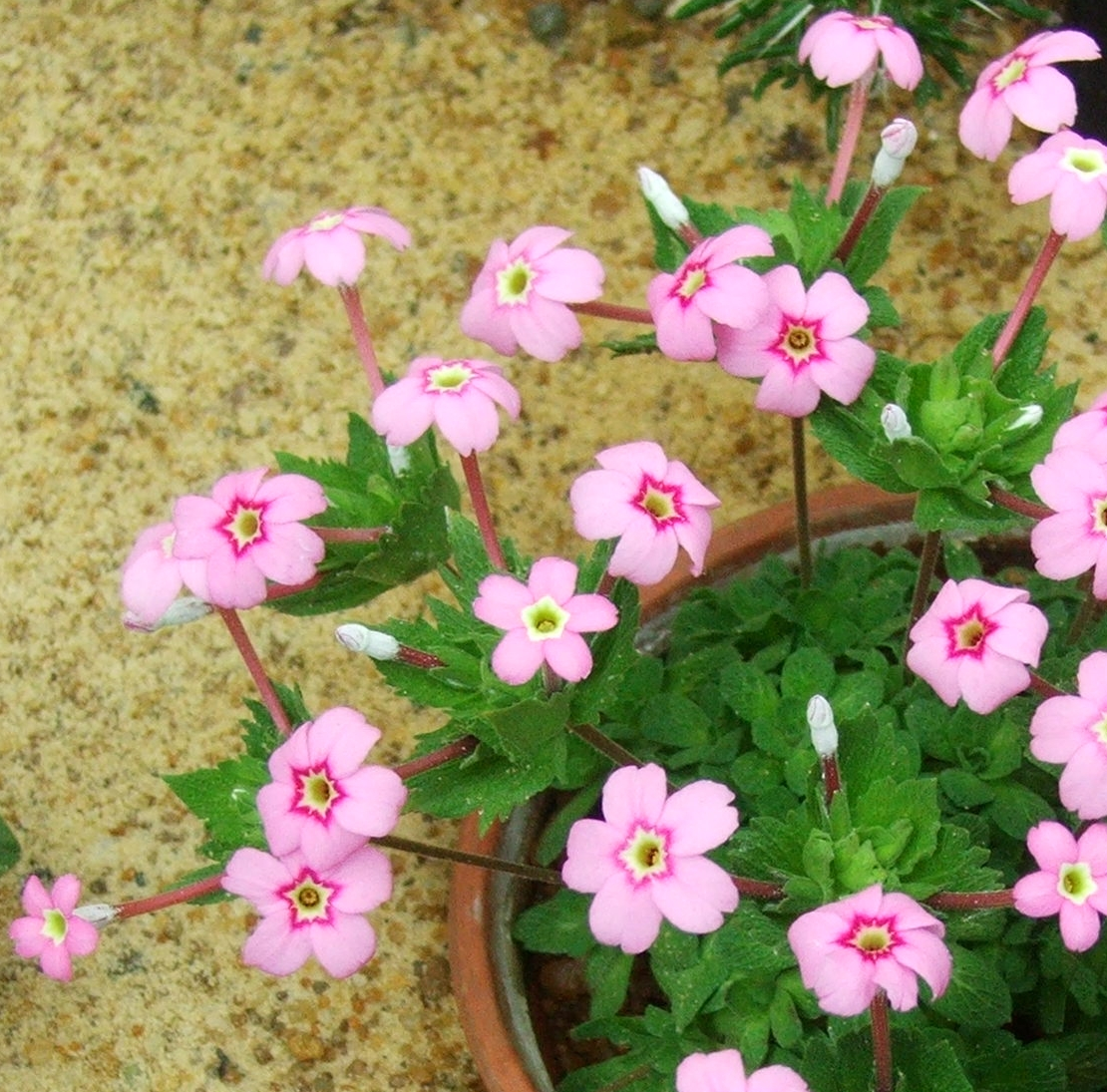
- Dionysia involucrata

Scientific classification
- Kingdom: Plantae
- Clade: Tracheophytes
- Clade: Angiosperms
- Clade: Eudicots
- Clade: Asterids
- Order: Ericales
- Family: Primulaceae
- Subfamily: Primuloideae
- Genus: Dionysia; Fenzl

Type species
- Dionysia odora
- Distribution map with Iran in the center.

Synonyms
- Macrosyphonia Duby 1844

= Dionysia (plant) =

Genus of flowering plants

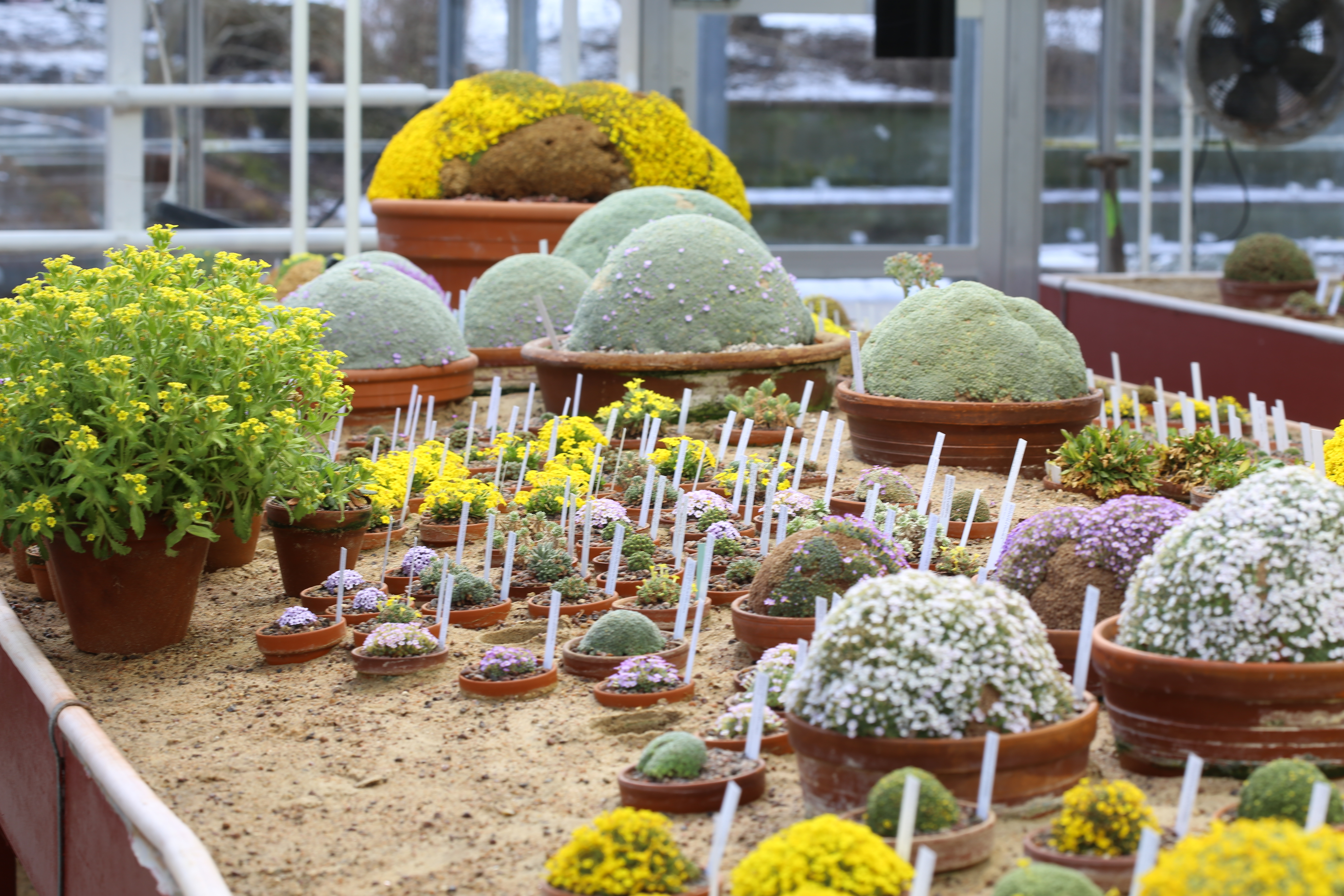
Some species of Dionysia at Gothenburg Botanical Garden.

Dionysia is a genus containing 61 species of flowering plants in the family Primulaceae. They are small, cushion-forming alpines native to mountains of Iran, Iraq, Turkey, sauth Turkmenistan, northwestern Pakistan, Tajikistan, Afghanistan and parts of Oman. They are usually evergreen perennials with felted leaves, covered with bright yellow or pink, five-petalled flowers in spring. They are often difficult to cultivate if the correct conditions are not provided.

Most species of Dionysia are cushion plants that grow in dry mountain environments, but some species are taller and prefer moist environments. In many species, the leaves are covered with an aromatic wax. The leaves are very drought resistant in some species and are reinforced with stone cells (sclerids) either around the nerves or freely in the leaf tissue. These species blooms profusely in early spring with yellow, purple, violet or pink flowers, often being completely covered by the flowers. The range of most Dionysia species is small and confined to one ridge, mountain or its slope. The disappearance of species from their habitats is associated with the construction of roads, as well as with the collection of plants by collectors for planting in alpine slides and The number of species also decreases due to grazing.

== Species ==
Species include:

Image	Scientific name	Distribution
	Dionysia afghanica Grey-Wilson	
	Dionysia archibaldii Wendelbo	
	Dionysia aretioides (Lehm.) Boiss.	
	Dionysia assadii Borjian	
	Dionysia aubrietioides Jamzad & Mozaff.	
	Dionysia avia Mehregan, Younesi & Lidén	
	Dionysia bachtiarica Bornm. & Alex.	
	Dionysia balsamea Wendelbo & Rech.f.	
	Dionysia bazoftica Jamzad	
	Dionysia bornmuelleri (Pax) Clay	
	Dionysia bryoides Boiss.	
	Dionysia cespitosa (Duby) Boiss.	
	Dionysia cristagalli Lidén	
	Dionysia curviflora Bunge	
	Dionysia denticulata Wendelbo	
	Dionysia diapensiifolia Boiss.	
	Dionysia esfandiarii Wendelbo	
	Dionysia freitagii Wendelbo	
	Dionysia gandzhinae Kamelin	
	Dionysia gaubae Bornm.	
	Dionysia haussknechtii Bornm. & Strauss	
	Dionysia hedgei Wendelbo	
	Dionysia hissarica Lipsky	
	Dionysia involucrata Zapriag.	
	Dionysia iranica Jamzad	
	Dionysia iranshahrii Wendelbo	
	Dionysia jamzadiae Lidén, M.Irvine, Alvén & Mehregan	
	Dionysia janthina Bornm.	
	Dionysia khatamii Mozaff.	
	Dionysia khuzistanica Jamzad	
	Dionysia kossinskyi Czerniak.	
	Dionysia × kowsariana Zeraatkar & Khajoei	
	Dionysia lacei (Hemsl. & G.Watt) Clay	
	Dionysia lamingtonii Stapf	
	Dionysia leucotricha Bornm.	
	Dionysia lindbergii Wendelbo	
	Dionysia lurorum Wendelbo	
	Dionysia michauxii (Duby) Boiss.	
	Dionysia microphylla Wendelbo	
	Dionysia mira (Jaub. & Spach) Wendelbo	
	Dionysia mozaffarianii Lidén	
	Dionysia odora Fenzl	
	Dionysia oreodoxa Bornm.	
	Dionysia paradoxa Wendelbo	
	Dionysia revoluta Boiss.	
	Dionysia rhaptodes Bunge	
	Dionysia robusta Younesi	
	Dionysia saponacea Wendelbo & Rech.f.	
	Dionysia sarvestanica Jamzad & Grey-Wilson	
	Dionysia splendens Alipour, Mehregan & Lidén	
	Dionysia tacamahaca Lidén	
	Dionysia tapetodes Bunge	
	Dionysia termeana Wendelbo	
	Dionysia teucrioides P.H.Davis & Wendelbo	
	Dionysia viscidula Wendelbo	
	Dionysia viva Lidén & Zetterl.	
	Dionysia wendelboi Podlech	
	Dionysia zagrica Grey-Wilson	
	Dionysia zetterlundii Lidén	
	Dionysia zeynepiae Güzel	
	Dionysia zschummelii Lidén	

Dionysia aretioides, with yellow flowers, has gained the Royal Horticultural Society's Award of Garden Merit.
