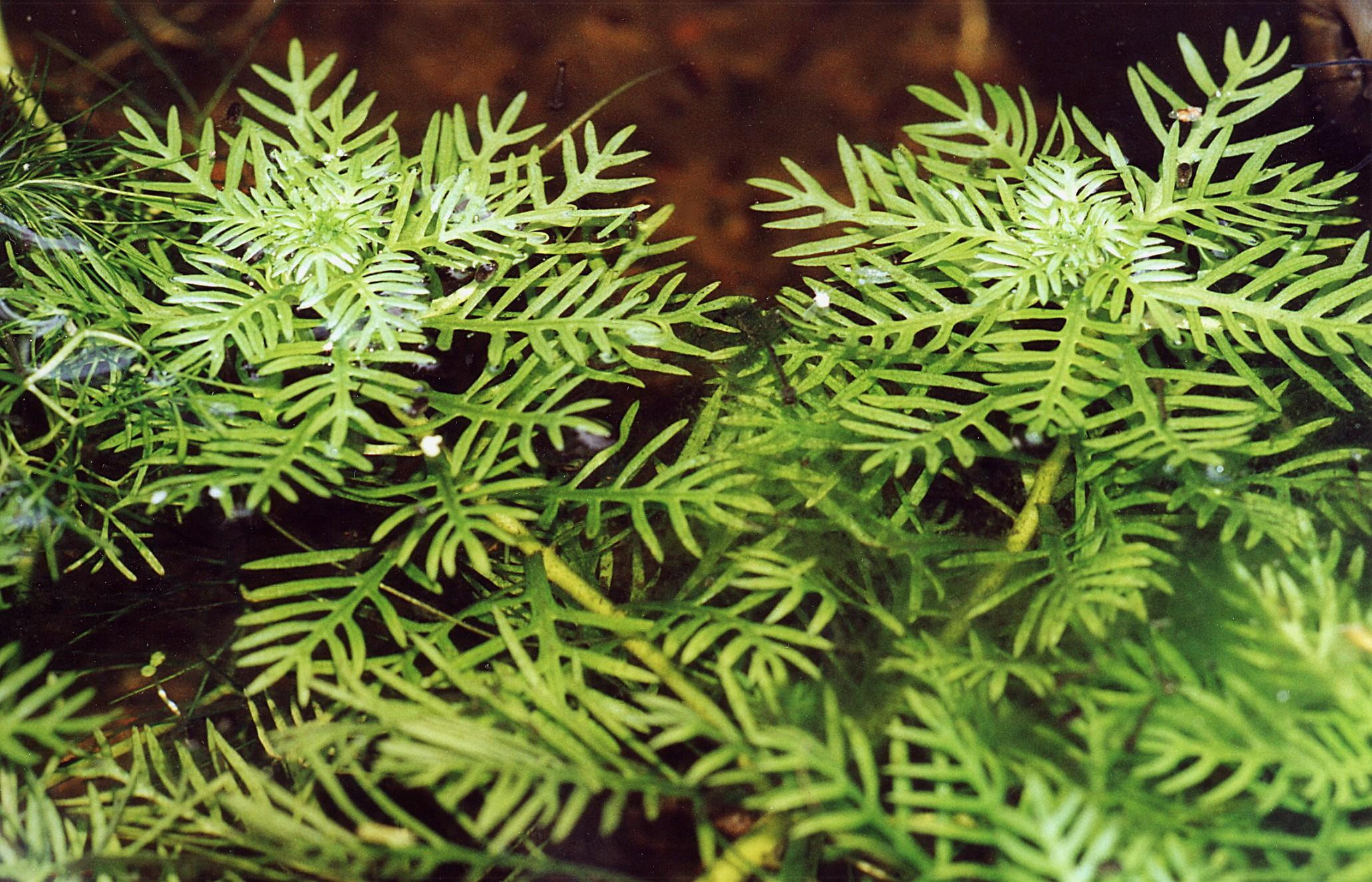
- Foliage of H. palustris

Scientific classification
- Kingdom: Plantae
- Clade: Embryophytes
- Clade: Tracheophytes
- Clade: Angiosperms
- Clade: Eudicots
- Clade: Asterids
- Order: Ericales
- Family: Primulaceae
- Subfamily: Primuloideae
- Genus: Hottonia; L.

Species
- Hottonia palustris L.; Hottonia inflata Elliott

= Hottonia =

Genus of flowering plants in the primrose family

Hottonia is a genus of aquatic flowering plant in the family Primulaceae. It comprises two species, both of which are known by the common name featherfoil:

Inflorescences of the two Hottonia species

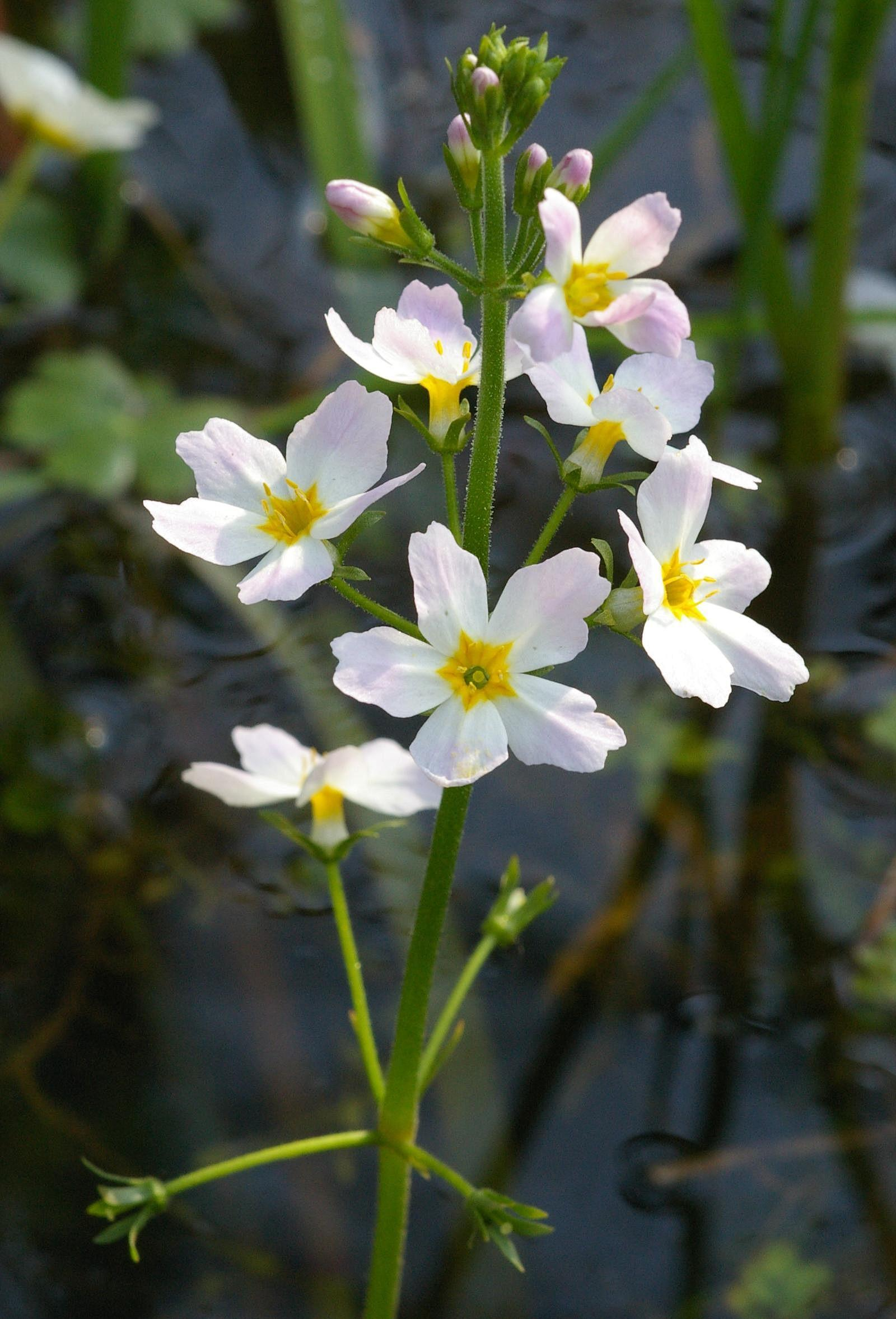
H. palustris

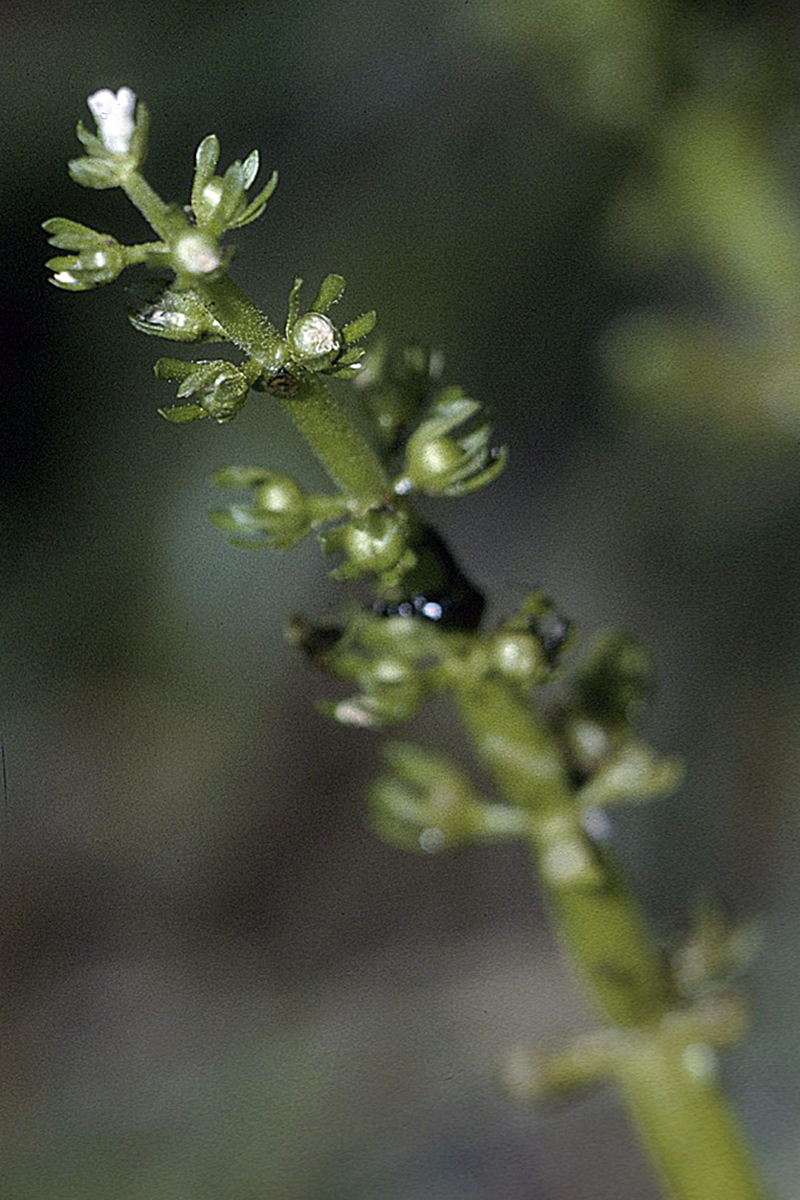
H. inflata

- Hottonia palustris, or water violet, native to Europe and western Asia
- Hottonia inflata, or American featherfoil, native to North America

The two species differ markedly in the size of the flowers, which are showy in the Eurasian H. palustris but much smaller in the North American H. inflata, and in the thickness of the stem, which is swollen in H. inflata but not in H. palustris. The two species also differ in their breeding system: H. palustris is heterostylous, whereas H. inflata is not.

Carl Linnaeus named the genus in his 1753 book Species Plantarum, commemorating the botanist Peter Hotton.
