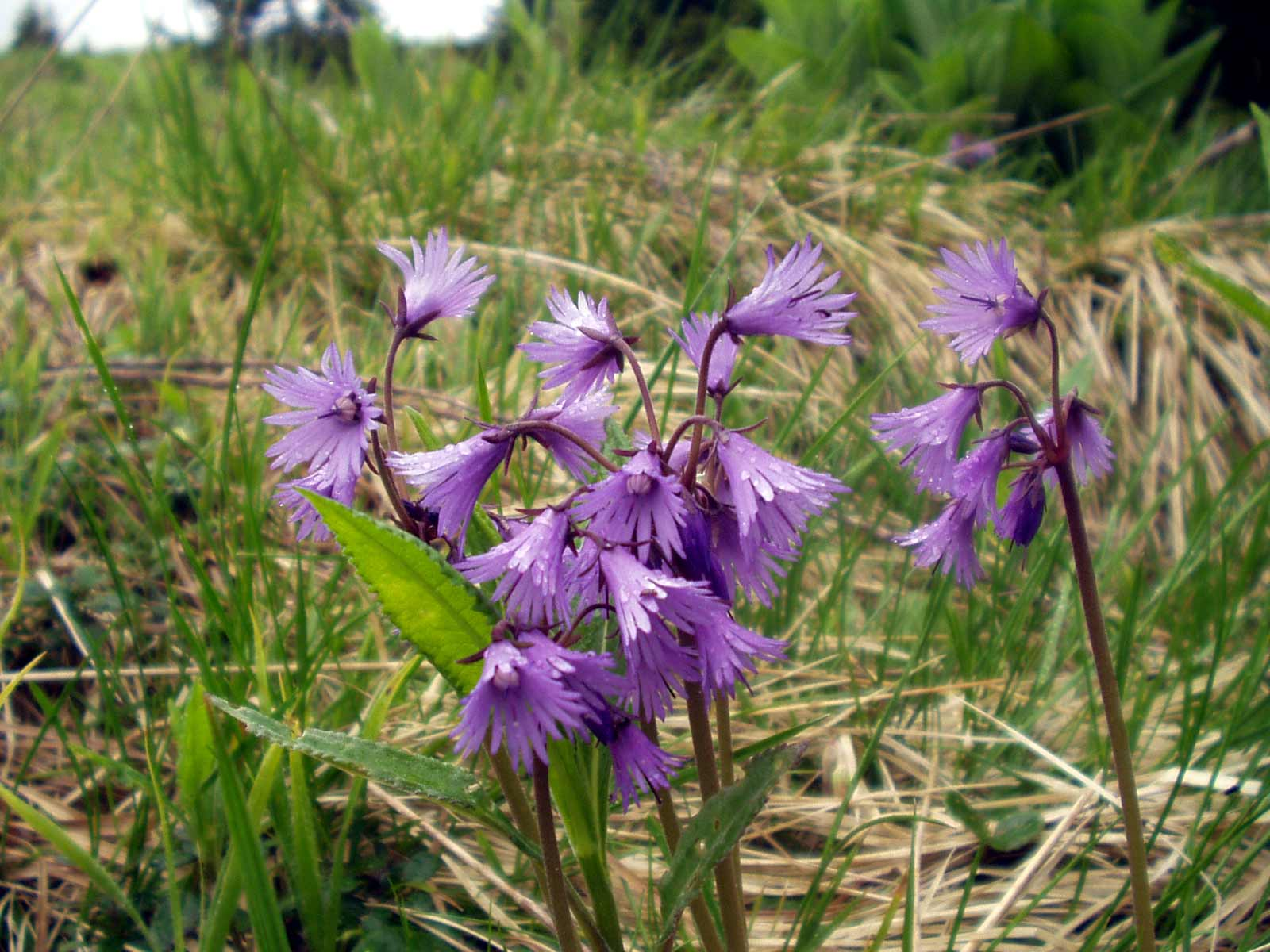
- Soldanella alpina

Scientific classification
- Kingdom: Plantae
- Clade: Embryophytes
- Clade: Tracheophytes
- Clade: Angiosperms
- Clade: Eudicots
- Clade: Asterids
- Order: Ericales
- Family: Primulaceae
- Subfamily: Primuloideae
- Genus: Soldanella; L.

Species
- Soldanella alpicola Soldanella alpina Soldanella angusta Soldanella austriaca Soldanella calabrella Soldanella carpatica Soldanella chrysosticta Soldanella hungarica Soldanella major Soldanella marmarossiensis Soldanella minima Soldanella montana Soldanella oreodoxa Soldanella pindicola Soldanella pseudomontana Soldanella pusilla Soldanella rhodopaea Soldanella tatricola Soldanella villosa

= Soldanella =

Genus of flowering plants

The genus Soldanella, commonly known in English as snowbell, includes about 15 species of flowering plants native to European mountains, from the Pyrenees, the Apennines, the Alps, the Carpathians and the Balkans. They grow in woods, damp pastures and rocky landscapes from 500–3,000 m (1,600–9,800 ft) above sea level, often in hollows which hold snow into late spring and early summer. The name Soldanella means "little coins" in Italian.

== Appearance ==
The plant typically has a basal rosette of simple, orbicular leaves 1–5 cm (0.4–2.0 in) wide, with the flower stalks arising from the centre of the rosette, each stalk bearing 1–6 white to violet flowers.

The species are similar to each other and it is nearly impossible to identify images. Subtle differences are observable using a magnifying glass.

The species can be lumped in groups of similar appearance.

Large-sized plants

1. S. villosa occurring in Basque Lands at low elevations has large papery leaves and about 1 mm glandular hairs on petioles.

Medium-sized plants

2. S. alpina including S. occidentalis and S. pyrolaefolia occurring in the Alps and Southern European mountains has sitting glands on petioles, scapes and pedicels.

3. S. carpatica occurring in the Western Carpathians in Slovakia and Poland has sitting glands on petioles but short glandular hairs on pedicels.

4. S. marmarossiensis including S. rugosa occurring in the North-Eastern Carpatians in Ukraine and Romania has short glandular hairs on petioles and pedicels and narrowly crateriform corolla.

5. S. angusta, S. calabrella, S. chrysosticta including S. cyanaster, S. hungarica, S. major, S. montana, S. oreodoxa, S. pindicola including S. dimoniei and S. macedonica, S. pseudomontana, S. rhodopaea, S. tatricola all having broadly crateriform corolla mutually differ in the length and shape of cells forming short glandular hairs on petioles and pedicels.

Small-sized plants

6. S. alpicola occurring in the Alps, S. pusilla occurring in the Southern Carpathians and S. pirinica occurring in Bulgaria are characterized by the top position of the bract and sitting glands. Often encountered hybrid S. alpina × S. alpicola has laterally positioned bract.

7. S. austriaca and S. minima occurring in the Alps and Apennines are characterized by short glandular hairs and laterally positioned bract.
