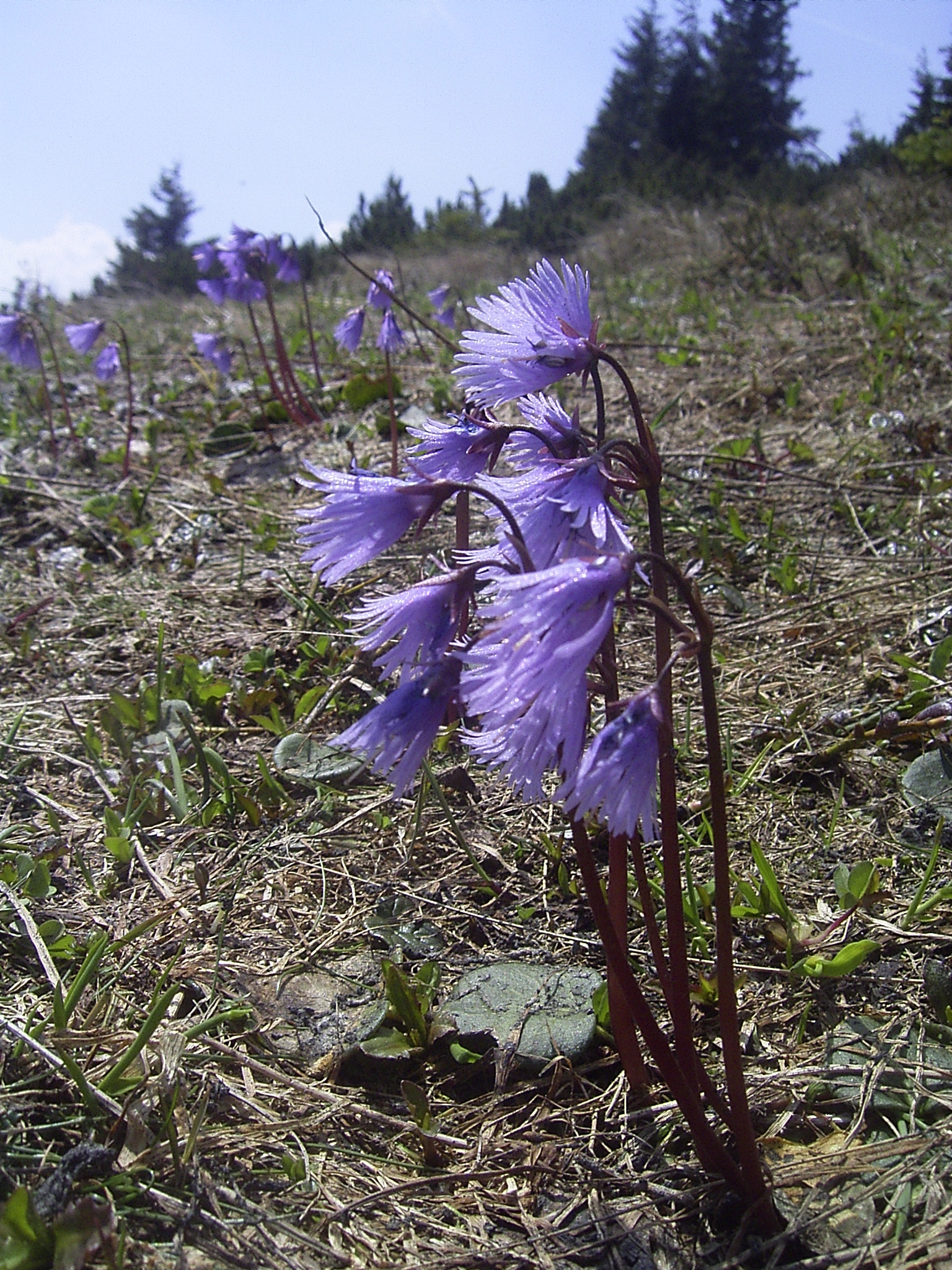

Scientific classification
- Kingdom: Plantae
- Clade: Embryophytes
- Clade: Tracheophytes
- Clade: Spermatophytes
- Clade: Angiosperms
- Clade: Eudicots
- Clade: Asterids
- Order: Ericales
- Family: Primulaceae
- Genus: Soldanella
- Species: S. alpina

Binomial name
- Soldanella alpina L.

= Soldanella alpina =

Alpine snowbell

Species of flowering plant

Soldanella alpina, the alpine snowbell or blue moonwort, is a member of the family Primulaceae native to the Alps and Pyrenees.
