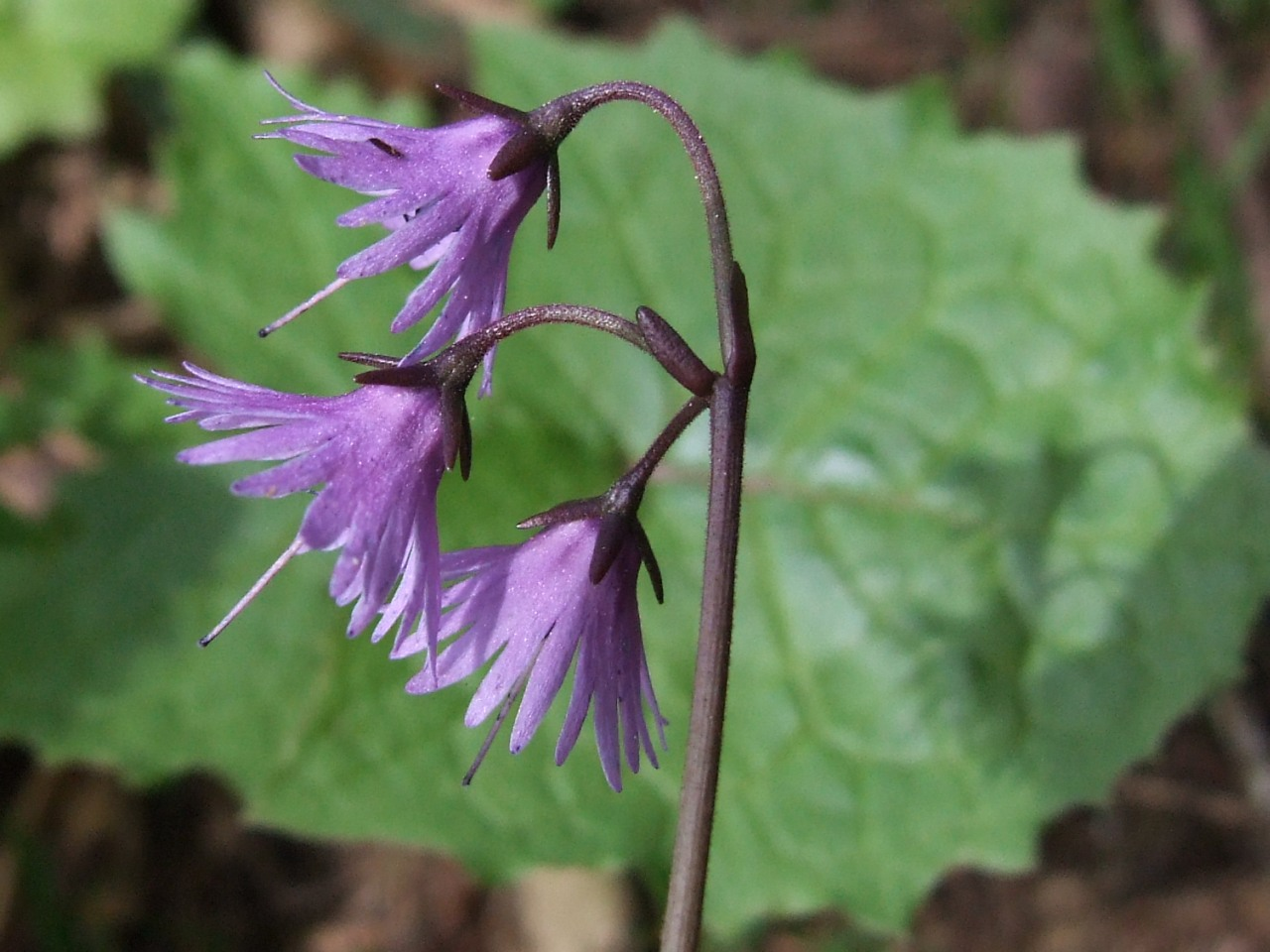

Scientific classification
- Kingdom: Plantae
- Clade: Tracheophytes
- Clade: Angiosperms
- Clade: Eudicots
- Clade: Asterids
- Order: Ericales
- Family: Primulaceae
- Genus: Soldanella
- Species: S. carpatica

Binomial name
- Soldanella carpatica Vierh.

= Soldanella carpatica =

Species of flowering plant

Soldanella carpatica is a species of flowering plant in the primrose family native to Slovakia and Poland.
