= Petrus Houttuyn =

Dutch botanist and medical professor

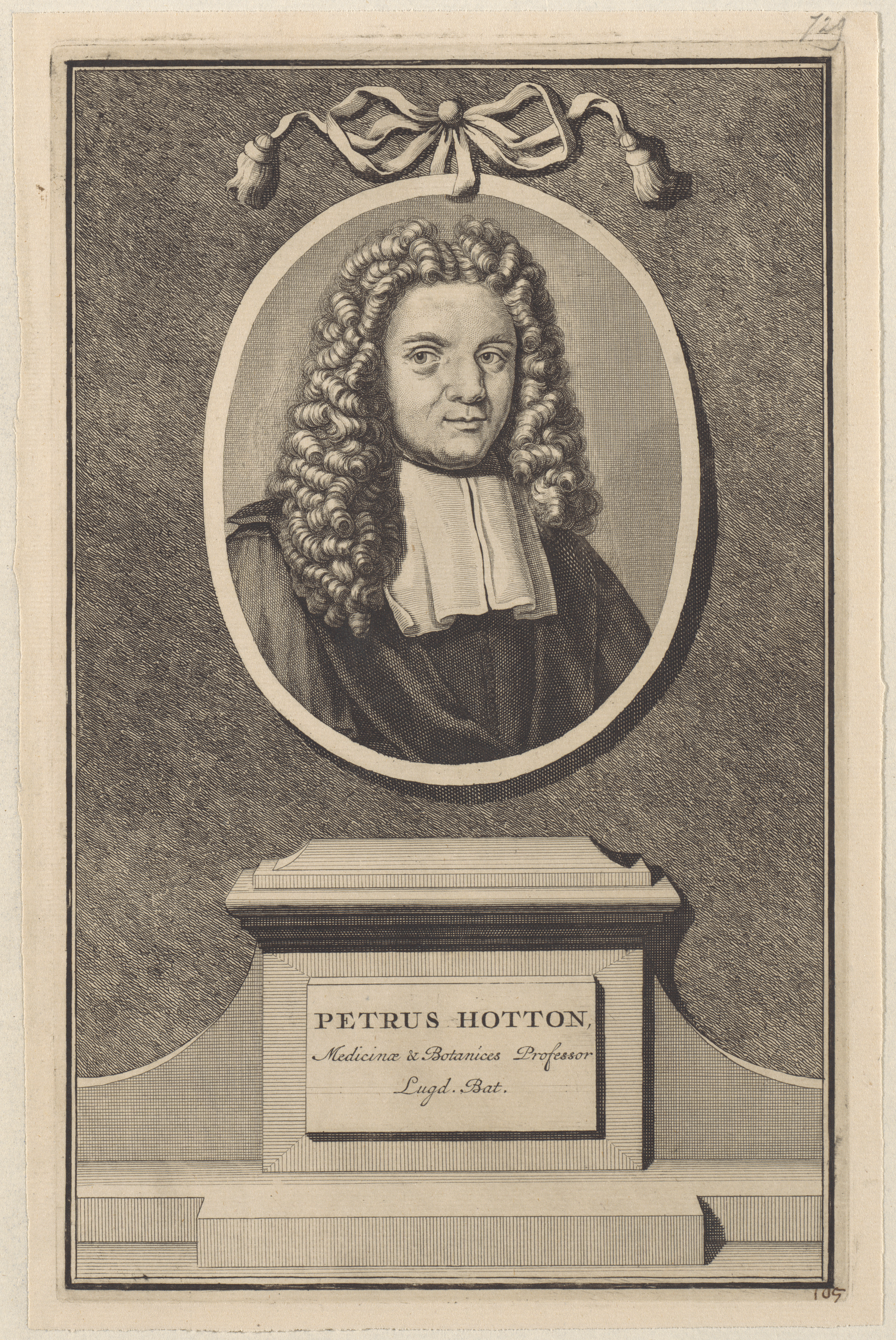
Petrus Hotton

Petrus Houttuyn (18 June 1648, Amsterdam – 10 January 1709, Leiden), often cited as Peter Hotton, was a Dutch botanist and medical professor of medicine and botany at Leiden University. As professor of botany, he was ex officio supervisor of the university's botanic garden, and was given an official residence and an allowance for foreign correspondence and the exchange of seeds and plants.

He studied medicine in Leiden, obtaining his doctor's degree in 1672. In 1695, he succeeded Paul Hermann as professor of botany at the University of Leiden. Houttuyn was a member of the Leopoldina and a fellow of the Royal Society of London. He was succeeded in turn by Herman Boerhaave.

The genus Hottonia (family Primulaceae) is named in his honor.

== Selected works ==
- Positiones quaedam medicae, 1672.
- Sermo academicus quo rei herbariae historia et fata adumbrantur, 1695.
- Letter from Petrus Hotton (1648-1709), 1704.
- Bibliotheca Hottoniana: sive Catalogus Librorum, 1709.
