= Kaufmannia =

Scientific classification
- Kingdom: Plantae
- Clade: Tracheophytes
- Clade: Angiosperms
- Clade: Eudicots
- Clade: Asterids
- Order: Ericales
- Family: Primulaceae
- Genus: Kaufmannia; Regel (1875)
- Species: K. semenovii

Binomial name
- Kaufmannia semenovii (Herder) Regel (1875)

Synonyms
- Cortusa semenovii Herder (1868); Kaufmannia brachyanthera Losinsk. (1937)

Genus of plants

Kaufmannia semenovii is a species of flowering plant belonging to the family Primulaceae. It is the sole species in genus Kaufmannia. It is native to Kazakhstan and Kyrgyzstan in Central Asia.
