= Lipaphnaeus loxura =

Scientific classification
- Kingdom: Animalia
- Phylum: Arthropoda
- Clade: Pancrustacea
- Class: Insecta
- Order: Lepidoptera
- Family: Lycaenidae
- Genus: Lipaphnaeus
- Species: L. loxura

Binomial name
- Lipaphnaeus loxura (Rebel, 1914)

Synonyms
- Spindasis loxura Rebel, 1914

Species of butterfly

Lipaphnaeus loxura is a butterfly in the family Lycaenidae. It is found in the Democratic Republic of the Congo (Uele, Kivu and Lualaba), Uganda, western Kenya, Tanzania and Zambia.

The larvae feed on Maesa species, including M. lanceolata and M. welwitschii.
