= Maesa (disambiguation) =

Maesa is a genus of flowering plants.

Maesa could also refer to:

- Iolaus maesa, a species of butterfly found in West and Central Africa
- Julia Maesa (died c. 224 AD), a Roman historical figure
- Djenar Maesa Ayu (born 1973), an Indonesian novelist, actress, and filmmaker
