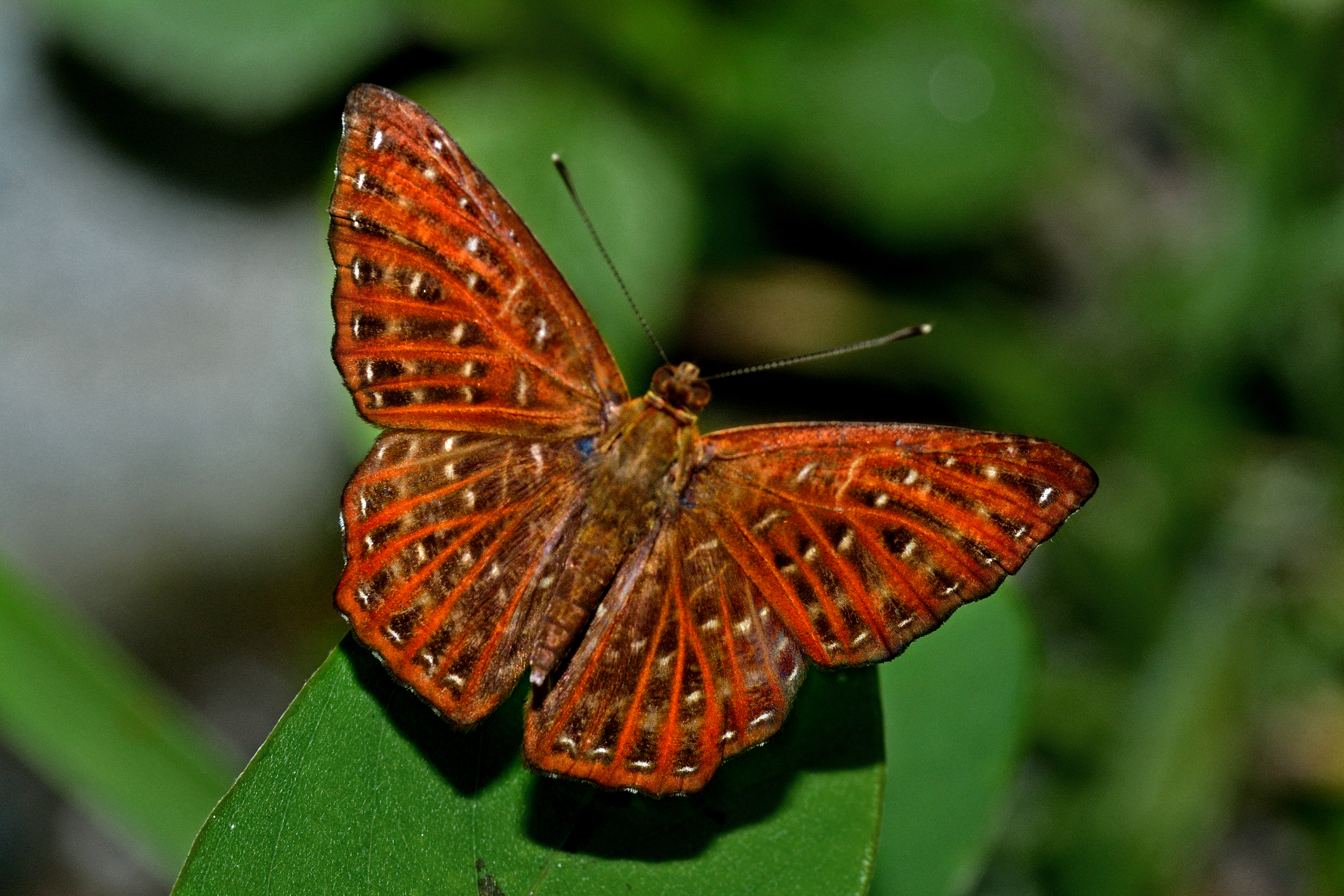

Scientific classification
- Kingdom: Animalia
- Phylum: Arthropoda
- Clade: Pancrustacea
- Class: Insecta
- Order: Lepidoptera
- Family: Riodinidae
- Genus: Zemeros
- Species: Z. flegyas

Binomial name
- Zemeros flegyas (Cramer, 1780)

= Zemeros flegyas =

Punchinello

Species of butterfly

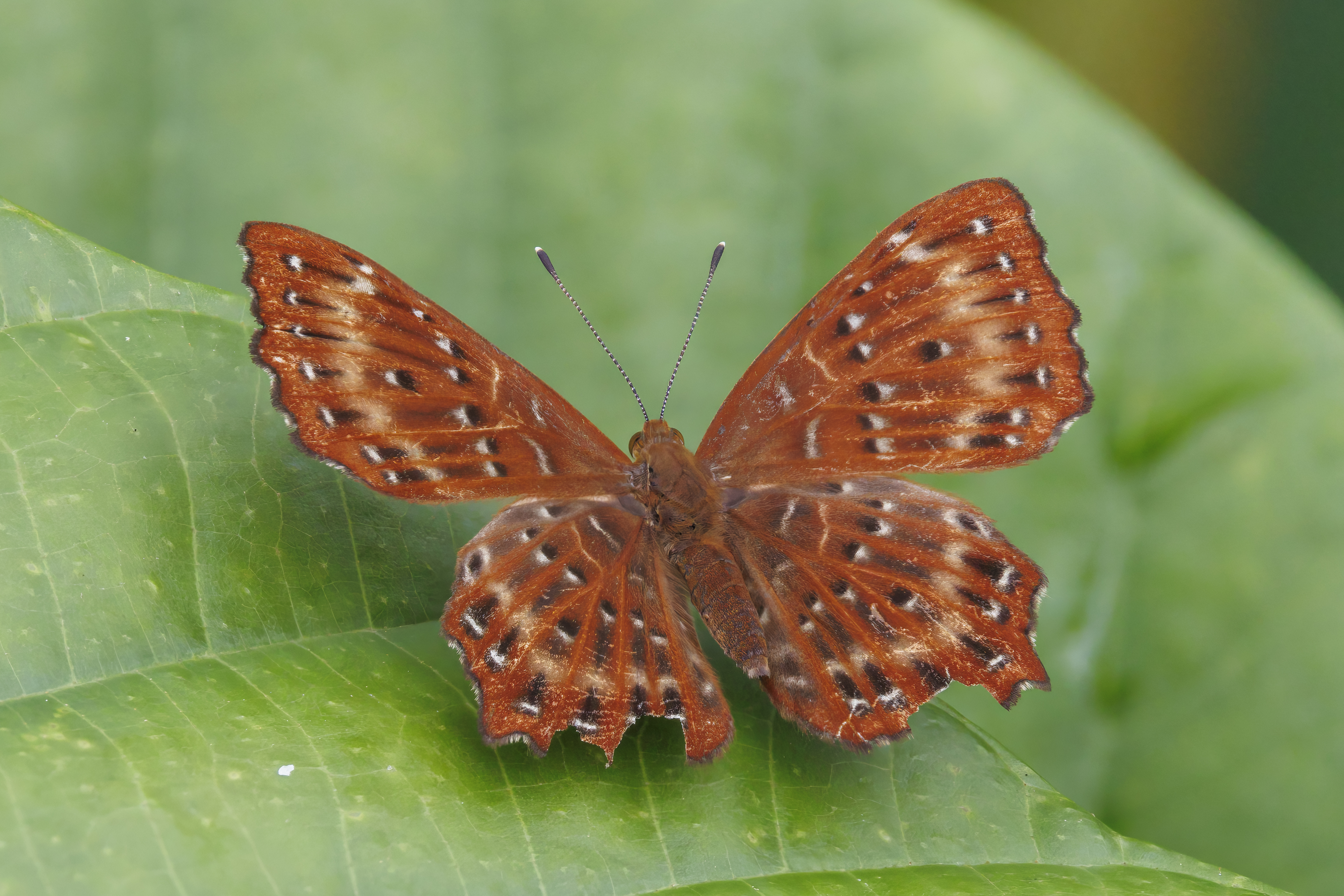
Z. f. allica, Laos

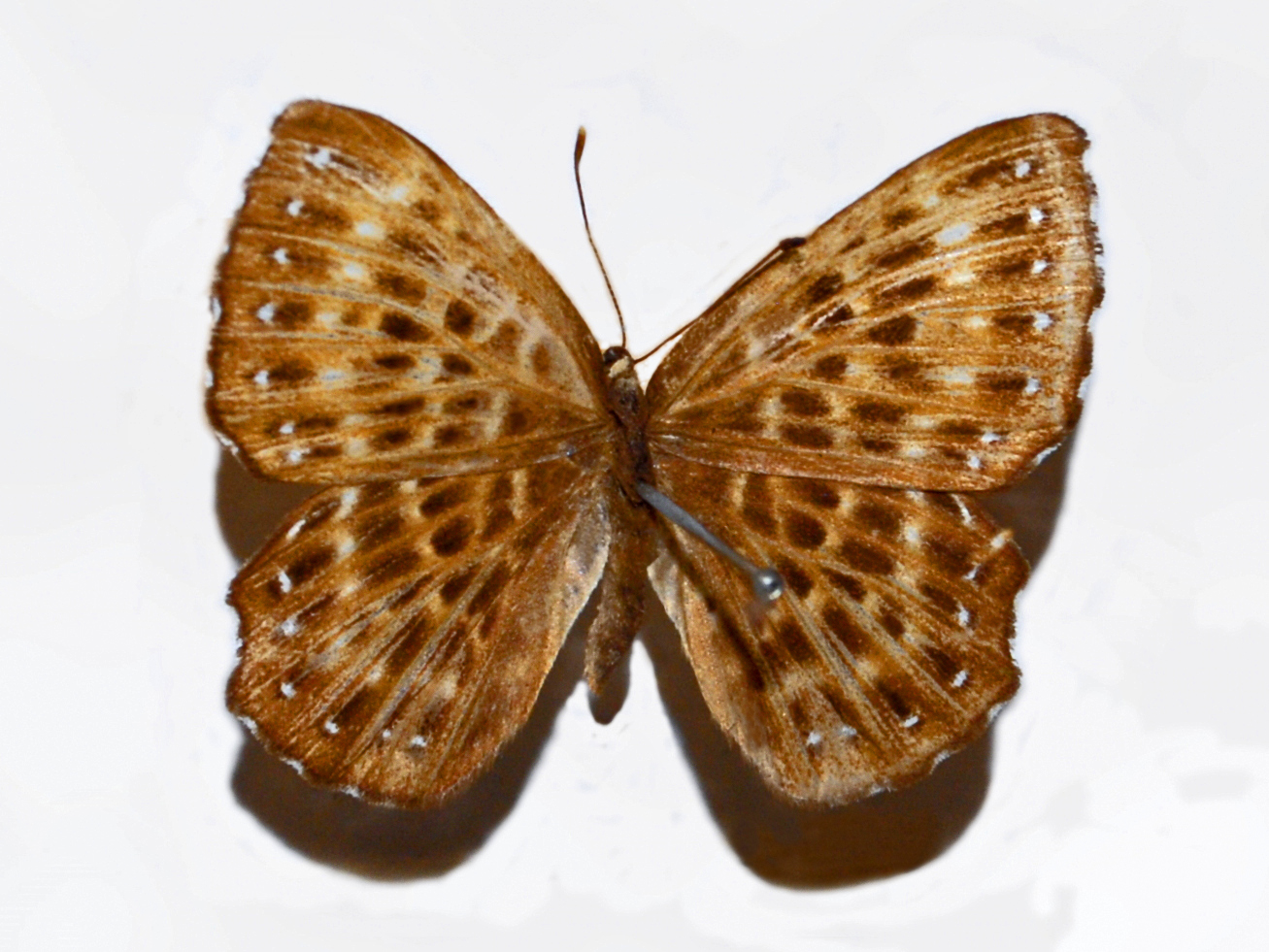
Mounted specimen of Z. f. sparsus from Nias island

Zemeros flegyas, the Punchinello, is a small butterfly found in South Asia and Southeast Asia that belongs to the family Riodinidae.

== Subspecies ==
- Z. f. flegyas Assam, northern India, southern Yunnan
- Z. f. indicus Fruhstorfer, 1898 Yunnan
- Z. f. albipunctatus Butler, 1874 Peninsular Malaya, Singapore
- Z. f. allica (Fabricius, 1787) Burma, Thailand, Langkawi, Indo China
- Z. f. annamensis Fruhstorfer, 1912 Annam
- Z. f. sipora Riley Mentawai
- Z. f. arimazes Fruhstorfer, 1912 Lombok
- Z. f. balinus Fruhstorfer, 1912 Bali
- Z. f. celebensis Fruhstorfer, 1899 central Sulawesi
- Z. f. confucius (Moore, 1878) Hainan
- Z. f. hostius Fruhstorfer, 1912 northern Borneo
- Z. f. javanus Moore, 1902 Java
- Z. f. phyliscus Fruhstorfer, 1912 Sumatra
- Z. f. retiarius Grose-Smith, 1895 Sumbawa
- Z. f. sosiphanes Fruhstorfer, 1912 southern Sulawesi
- Z. f. sparsus Fruhstorfer, 1898 Nias island
- Z. f. strigatus Pagenstecher Sumba
- Z. f. hondai Hayashi, 1976 Palawan

== Description ==
Like many tropical butterflies they show different wet- and dry-season forms.

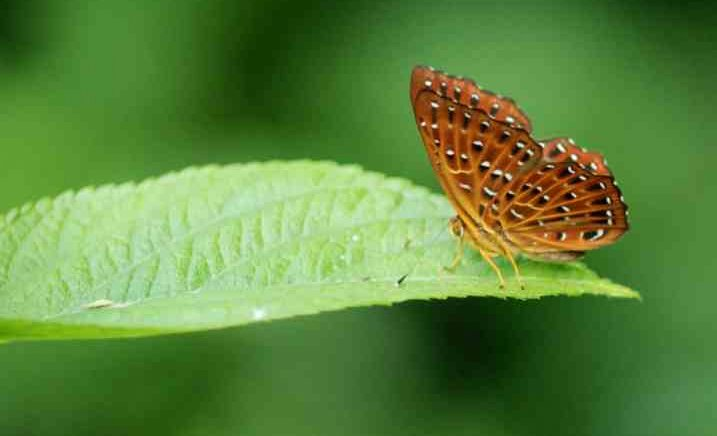
Punchinello, Kolkata, West Bengal, India

=== Wet-season form ===
Male upperside is vinaceous (colour of red wine) brown, the veins ochraceous brown. Forewings and hindwings crossed by four series of minute white spots, the postdiscal series very often obscure, each spot bordered inwardly by a more or less elongate black spot; a terminal very slender black line; cilia alternately black and white. Underside is bright ochraceous brown, the veins conspicuously paler, the white black-bordered spots as on the upperside but larger, more clearly defined and prominent. Antennae brown ringed with white; club black, ochraceous at apex; head, thorax and abdomen concolorous with the wings; beneath, the palpi, thorax and abdomen slightly paler than the wings.

=== Dry-season form ===
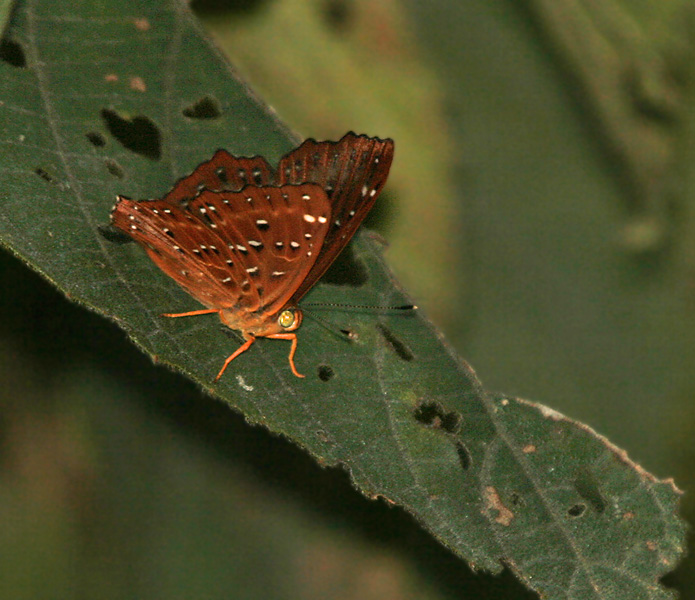
Dry-season form at Samsing in Darjeeling district of West Bengal, India

Male upperside has the ground colour darker than in the wet-season form; the spots are smaller and duller in colour. On the forewing the postdiscal series of spots often obsolescent except the spots in interspaces 3, 6 and 8, the latter two very large and prominent; sub-terminal series of spots also often obsolescent. The veins on both forewings and hindwings not paler than the ground colour. Underside is similar to the underside in the wet-season form, but the ground colour a shade darker; the veins not conspicuously paler; the white spots as in the wet-season form, except the postdiscal and subterminal series on the forewing, which are as on the upperside, the anterior large white spots of the postdiscal series being very prominent; the inner black bordering to the white spots much smaller than in the wet-season form. Antennae, head, thorax and abdomen as in the wet-season form.

Females have the upper and undersides similar to those of the wet-season form, but the ground colour brighter and paler; markings also similar, but the black bordering to the white spots less prominent.

== Larva ==
Adult: length .75 of an inch. Ovate, extremely flattened, inconspicuous. Colour pale green, head and anal segment slightly lighter; all the segments laterally rounded, covered with a whitish down, especially at the sides; an indistinct double longitudinal dorsal darker-green line throughout, enclosing a minute orange spot on seventh and eleventh segments; middle segments more than twice as broad as they are long; legs pale green, set well beneath the animal and rather close together. Full-grown at the end of March. Larva when about to change into the pupal state attaches itself to a patch of silky web, by the last segment, to the underside of a leaf of the food-plant, with the head towards the apex, and is girt about the middle with another web.

Larva feeds on Maesa species (Maesa chisia, Maesa montana and Maesa indica).

== Pupa ==
Length .55 to .70 of an inch. Fusiform, broadest in the middle . . . . anterior end truncate-rounded, distinctly broader than the posterior; the whole pupa flattened and of very slight depth even in the thickest part; the divisions hotween the segments well-marked; posterior segment bluntly rounded; head also rounded and divided in the middle at the apex into two lobes by a shallow notch........colour bright yellowish green throughout, marked above with rich emerald-green narrow lines arranged in an arabesque-like pattern on the two outer-thirds; a series of round spots along the middle of the back on the abdomen only, and a subdorsal line on either side interrupted at the segmental constrictions. Under surface pale yellowish green throughout, entirely unmarked..... The whole surface of the pupa smooth, without any hairs or shagreening whatever.

== Other references ==
- Evans, W.H. (1932). The Identification of Indian Butterflies (2nd ed.). Mumbai, India: Bombay Natural History Society.
- Wynter-Blyth, Mark Alexander (1957). Butterflies of the Indian Region. Bombay, India: Bombay Natural History Society. ISBN 978-8170192329.

Media related to Zemeros flegyas at Wikimedia Commons
