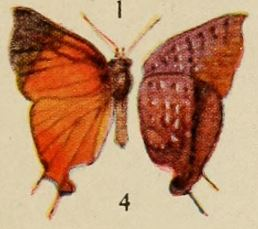

Scientific classification
- Kingdom: Animalia
- Phylum: Arthropoda
- Clade: Pancrustacea
- Class: Insecta
- Order: Lepidoptera
- Family: Lycaenidae
- Genus: Lipaphnaeus
- Species: L. aderna

Binomial name
- Lipaphnaeus aderna (Plötz, 1880)

Synonyms
- Zeritis aderna Plötz, 1880; Zeritis fallax Sharpe, 1890; Zeritis latifimbriata Sharpe, 1890; Aphnaeus ruficaudis Strand, 1918; Spindasis aderna pan Talbot, 1935; Aphnaeus spindasoides Aurivillius, 1916

= Lipaphnaeus aderna =

Species of butterfly

Lipaphnaeus aderna, the bramble false hairstreak or blue silver speckle, is a butterfly in the family Lycaenidae. It is found in Sierra Leone, Liberia, Ivory Coast, Ghana, Nigeria, Cameroon, the Democratic Republic of the Congo, Uganda, Kenya, Tanzania, Malawi, Mozambique and Zimbabwe. The habitat consists of forests and dense savanna.

Both sexes have been recorded on flowering shrubs in sunny glades. Adult males mud puddle. Adults are probably on wing year-round, with peaks from August to October and again from March to May.

The larvae feed on Maesa lanceolata. They are associated with ants of the genus Crematogaster.

== Subspecies ==
- Lipaphnaeus aderna aderna (Sierra Leone, Liberia, Ivory Coast, Ghana, Nigeria, Cameroon)
- Lipaphnaeus aderna pan (Talbot, 1935) (Uganda, western Kenya, north-western Tanzania, Democratic Republic of the Congo: Ituri and Kivu)
- Lipaphnaeus aderna spindasoides (Aurivillius, 1916) (south-eastern Kenya, Malawi, western Mozambique, eastern Zimbabwe, Tanzania: north-east to the Usambara Mountains)

Torben Larsen developed a species numbering system for his 2005 publication Butterflies of West Africa. The nominate subspecies is #379. The 'Larsen' numbers have since been used with permission in A Sharp Eye on Butterflies of Ghana.
