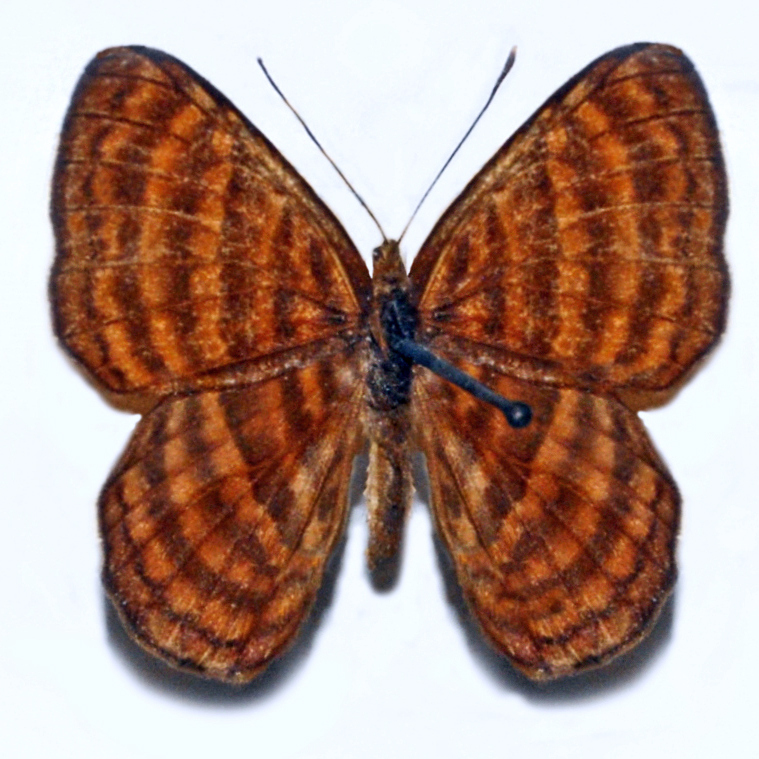
- Zemeros emesoides. Mounted specimen

Scientific classification
- Kingdom: Animalia
- Phylum: Arthropoda
- Clade: Pancrustacea
- Class: Insecta
- Order: Lepidoptera
- Family: Riodinidae
- Genus: Zemeros
- Species: Z. emesoides

Binomial name
- Zemeros emesoides C. & R. Felder, 1860

= Zemeros emesoides =

Species of butterfly

Zemeros emesoides is a small butterfly that belongs to the family Riodinidae.

== Subspecies ==
- Zemeros emesoides emesoides - Peninsular Malaya
- Zemeros emesoides zynias Fruhstorfer, 1914- Sumatra
- Zemeros emesoides bangueyanus Fruhstorfer, 1912 - Banggi
- Zemeros emesoides eso Fruhstorfer, 1904 – Borneo

== Description ==
Zemeros emesoides is a midsized butterfly with coppery orange wings, characterized by orange and brown copper lines parallel to the margins. The underside wings have the same pattern.

Larvae feed on Maesa sp. (Primulaceae).

== Distribution ==
This species can be found in Sumatra, Borneo, Peninsular Malaya and Singapore.
