= Maesa velutina =

Conservation status
- Endangered (IUCN 2.3)

Scientific classification
- Kingdom: Plantae
- Clade: Embryophytes
- Clade: Tracheophytes
- Clade: Angiosperms
- Clade: Eudicots
- Clade: Asterids
- Order: Ericales
- Family: Primulaceae
- Genus: Maesa
- Species: M. velutina

Binomial name
- Maesa velutina Mez

Species of flowering plant

Maesa velutina is a species of flowering plant in the family Primulaceae. It is a tree native to Karnataka and Kerala in southwestern India.
