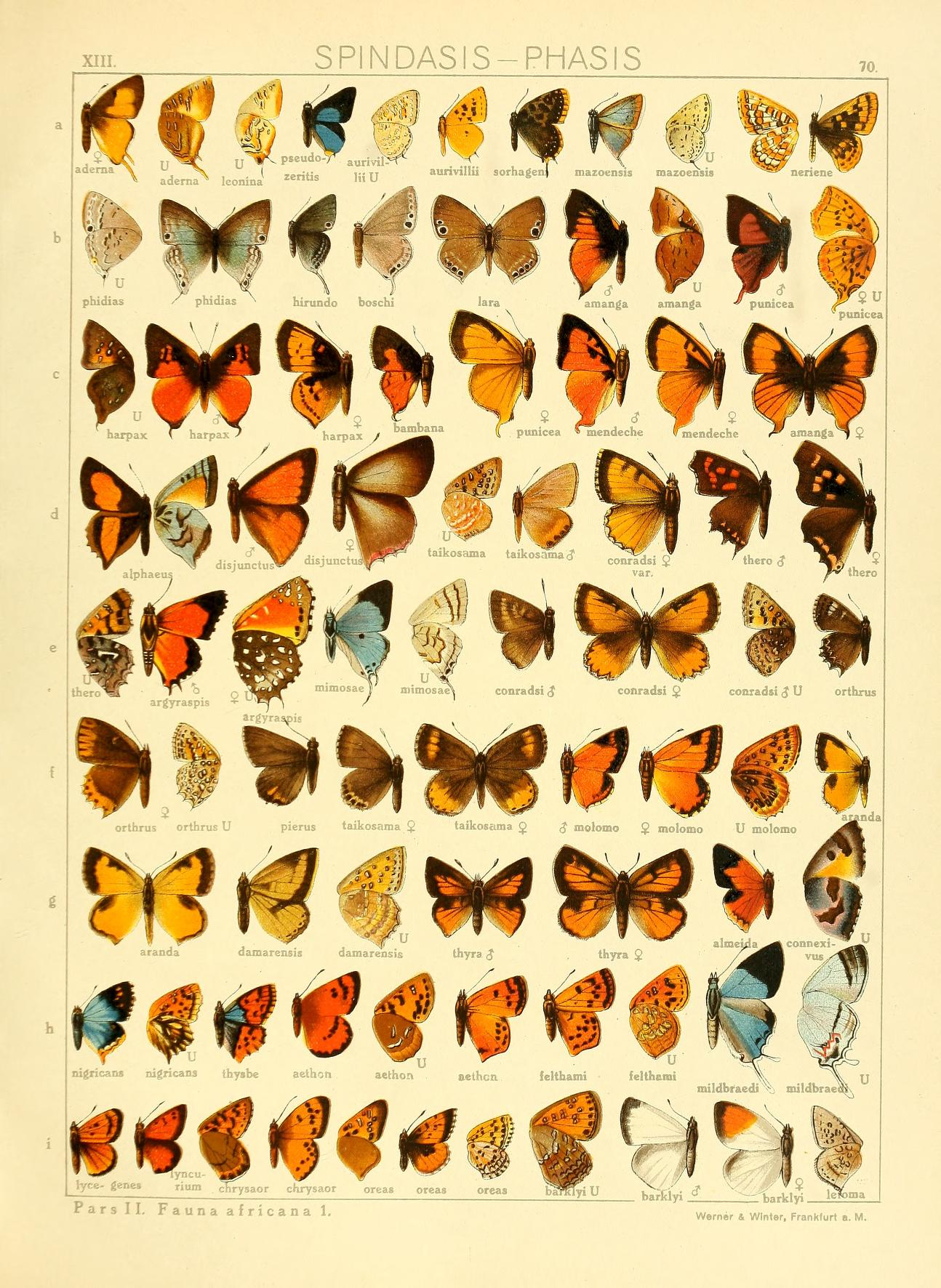

Scientific classification
- Domain: Eukaryota
- Kingdom: Animalia
- Phylum: Arthropoda
- Class: Insecta
- Order: Lepidoptera
- Family: Lycaenidae
- Genus: Lipaphnaeus
- Species: L. leonina

Binomial name
- Lipaphnaeus leonina (Sharpe, 1890)

Synonyms
- Zeritis leonina Sharpe, 1890; Zeritis bicolor Sharpe, 1891; Spindasis leonina bitje Druce, 1910; Spindasis paradoxa Schultze, 1908

= Lipaphnaeus leonina =

Species of butterfly

Lipaphnaeus leonina, the orange silver speckle, is a butterfly in the family Lycaenidae. It is found in Guinea, Sierra Leone, Liberia, Ivory Coast, Ghana, Togo, Benin, Nigeria, Cameroon, the Republic of the Congo, the Democratic Republic of the Congo, Uganda, Tanzania and Zambia. The habitat consists of forests.

== Subspecies ==
- L. l. leonina (Guinea, Sierra Leone, Liberia)
- L. l. bitje (Druce, 1910) (eastern Nigeria, southern Cameroon, Congo, Zambia, Democratic Republic of the Congo: Equateur, Uele, Sankuru and Lualaba)
- L. l. ivoirensis Stempffer, 1966 (eastern Liberia, Ivory Coast, Ghana, Benin, Togo, western Nigeria)
- L. l. paradoxa (Schultze, 1908) (north-western Cameroon, Uganda, north-western Tanzania)
