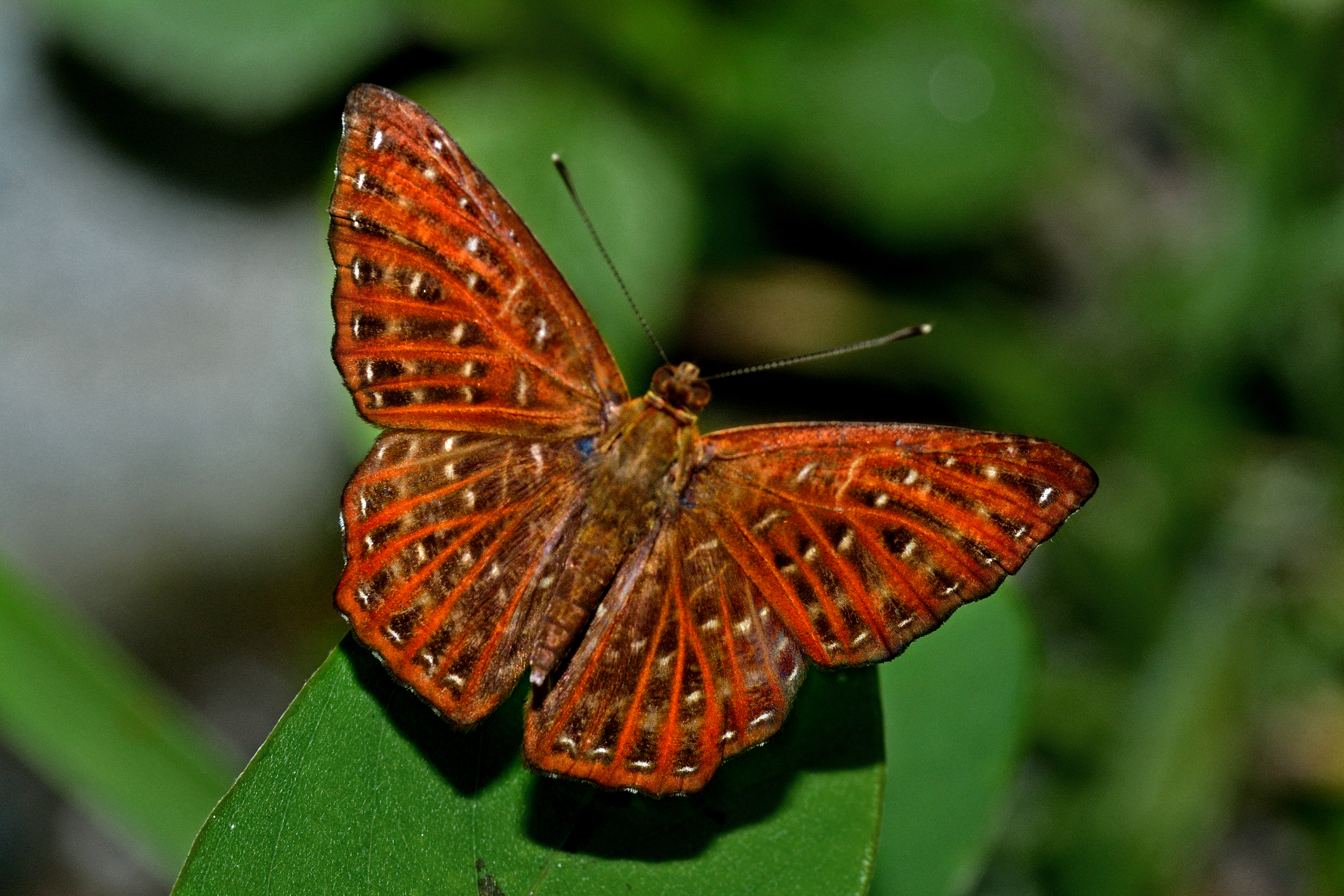
- Zemeros flegyas

Scientific classification
- Domain: Eukaryota
- Kingdom: Animalia
- Phylum: Arthropoda
- Class: Insecta
- Order: Lepidoptera
- Family: Riodinidae
- Subfamily: Nemeobiinae
- Tribe: Zemerini
- Genus: Zemeros; Boisduval, [1836]

= Zemeros =

Genus of butterflies

Zemeros is a genus of butterflies that belongs to the family Riodinidae.

== Species ==
- Zemeros flegyas
- Zemeros emesoides
