= Lipaphnaeus eustorgia =

Scientific classification
- Domain: Eukaryota
- Kingdom: Animalia
- Phylum: Arthropoda
- Class: Insecta
- Order: Lepidoptera
- Family: Lycaenidae
- Genus: Lipaphnaeus
- Species: L. eustorgia

Binomial name
- Lipaphnaeus eustorgia (Hulstaert, 1924)

Synonyms
- Axiocerses eustorgia Hulstaert, 1924

Species of butterfly

Lipaphnaeus eustorgia is a butterfly in the family Lycaenidae. It is found in the Democratic Republic of the Congo, Tanzania and Zambia.
