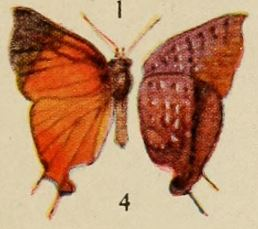
- Lipaphnaeus aderna

Scientific classification
- Domain: Eukaryota
- Kingdom: Animalia
- Phylum: Arthropoda
- Class: Insecta
- Order: Lepidoptera
- Family: Lycaenidae
- Subfamily: Aphnaeinae
- Genus: Lipaphnaeus; Aurivillius, 1916

= Lipaphnaeus =

Butterfly genus in family Lycaenidae

Lipaphnaeus is an Afrotropical genus of butterflies in the family Lycaenidae. The genus was erected by Per Olof Christopher Aurivillius in 1916.

== Species ==
- Lipaphnaeus aderna (Plötz, 1880)
- Lipaphnaeus eustorgia (Hulstaert, 1924)
- Lipaphnaeus leonina (Sharpe, 1890)
- Lipaphnaeus loxura (Rebel, 1914)
