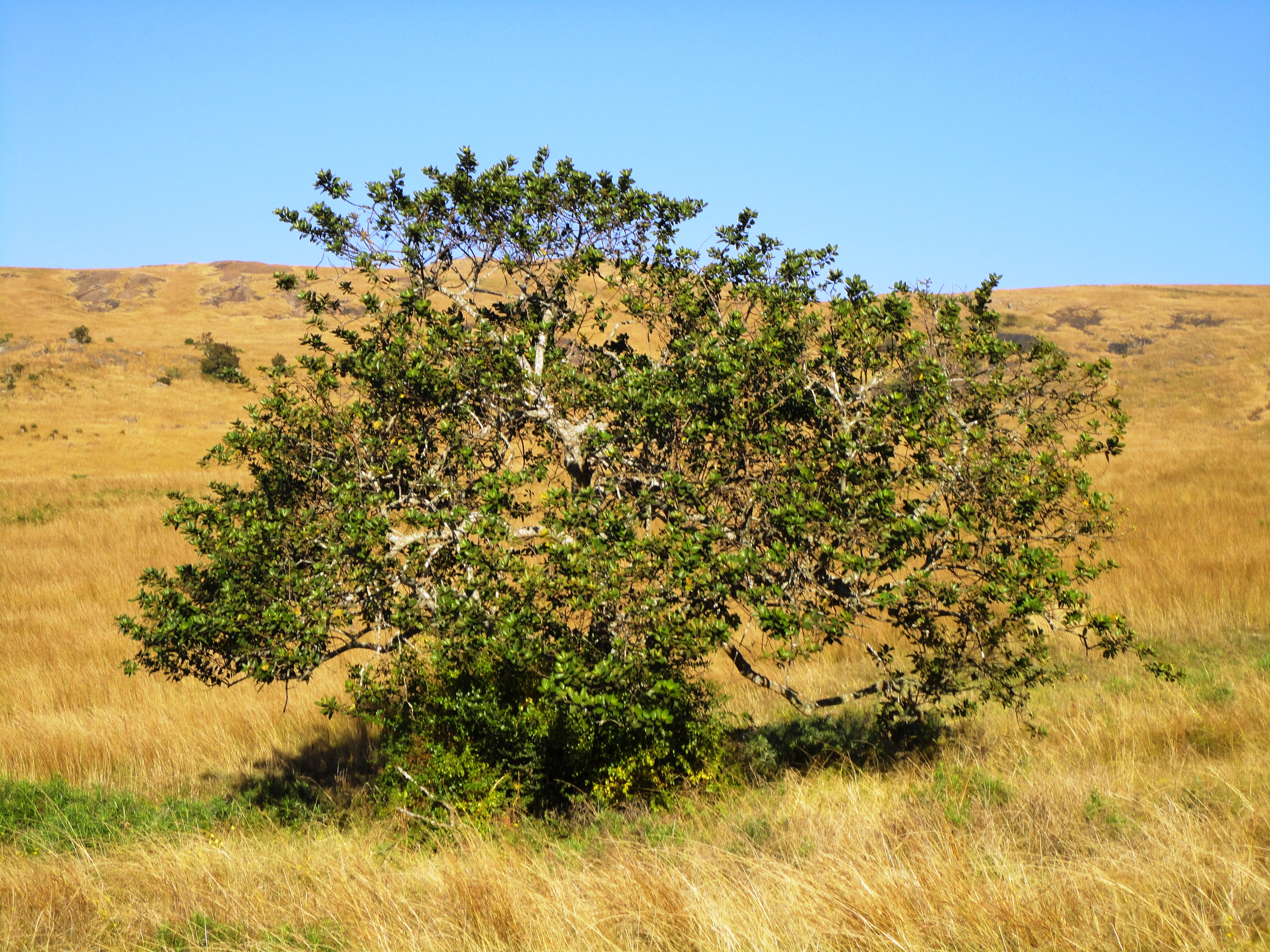

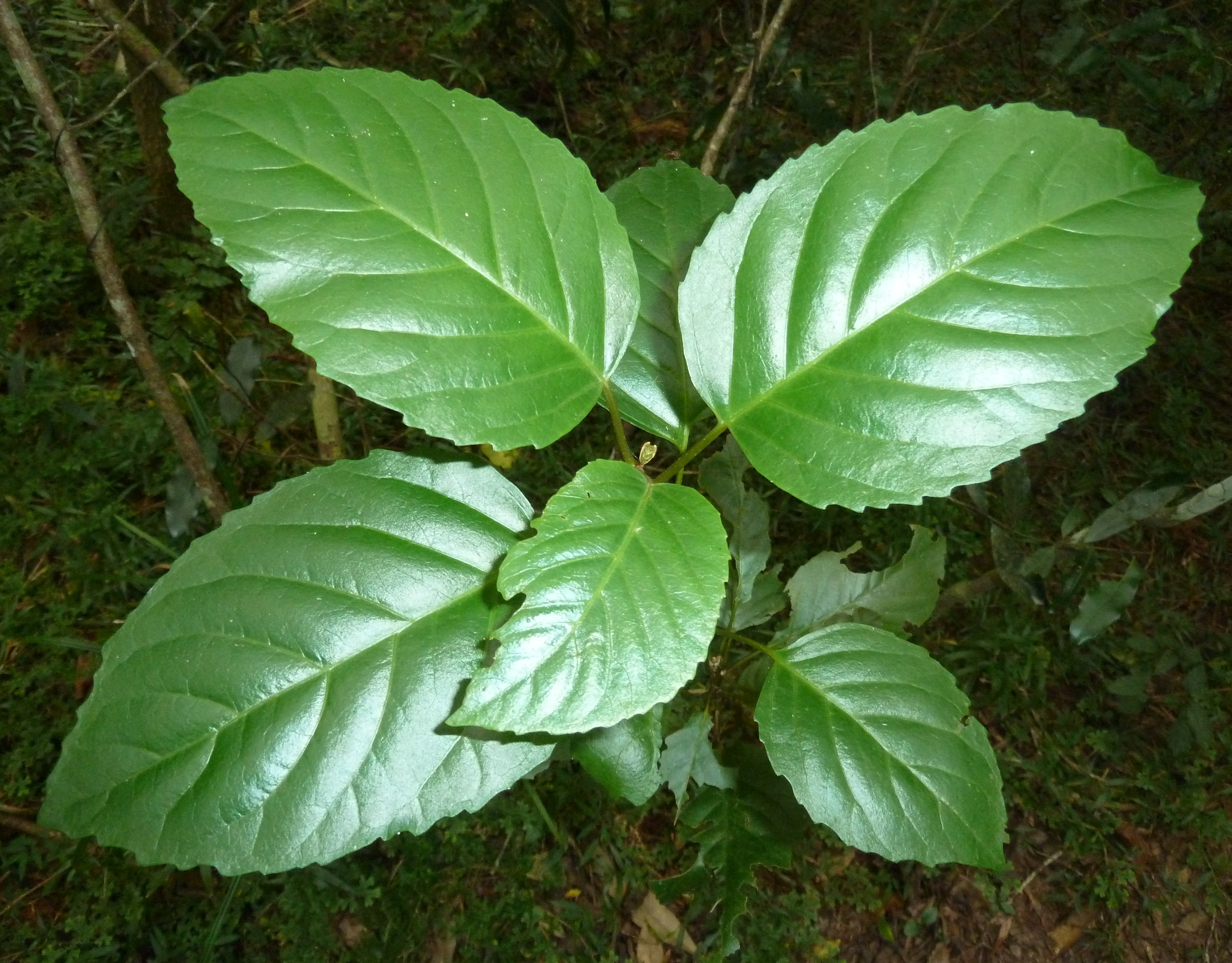

Scientific classification
- Kingdom: Plantae
- Clade: Tracheophytes
- Clade: Angiosperms
- Clade: Eudicots
- Clade: Asterids
- Order: Ericales
- Family: Primulaceae
- Genus: Maesa
- Species: M. lanceolata

Binomial name
- Maesa lanceolata Forssk.

= Maesa lanceolata =

False assegai

Species of tree

Maesa lanceolata, or the false assegai, is a tree species that is widespread in the Afrotropics, including Madagascar. It occurs from the southern Arabian Peninsula to the Eastern Cape of South Africa. It grows on stream verges, river banks and forest verges, where it is often a pioneer plant.

== Description ==
Maesa lanceolata grows either as a shrub or tree, when growing as a tree, it is capable of reaching 10 m tall, but it has been observed to reach 20 m. It has a grey, brown to reddish brown bark that is vertically fissured, the slash is pink turning brown with a dark reddish exudate. Leaves are petiolate, with the petiole capable of reaching 4 cm long. Leaflets are elliptical to lanceolate in outline, they can reach 16 cm in length and 7 cm in width with a margin that tends to be either serrate to crenate; the apex is acute and base is rounded to obsute. Flowers are arranged in shortly pedunculate axillary panicles, they are numerous and white to yellowish in color.

The fruits are yellow in color and globose in shape, they contain up to 20 seeds.

== Ecology ==
The yellow fruits of the species are consumed by the Yellow-whiskered greenbul and the olive-breasted mountain greenbul but can be toxic to humans.

== Distribution ==
Occurs in Tropical Africa and the Arabian Peninsula. They are commonly found in montane forest and gallery forest environments.

== Chemistry ==
Oleane type pentacyclic triterpenoid saponins have been isolated from the leaves of the species, also isolated from the leaves and fruits of the species is the bioactive benzoquinone, Maesanin.

== Uses ==
Though considered toxic to human the extracts of Maesa lanceolata have been used in different communities to treat various ailments. In East Africa root and fruit extracts are used by native healers in decoctions to treat cholera disease, tapeworm and sore throat.

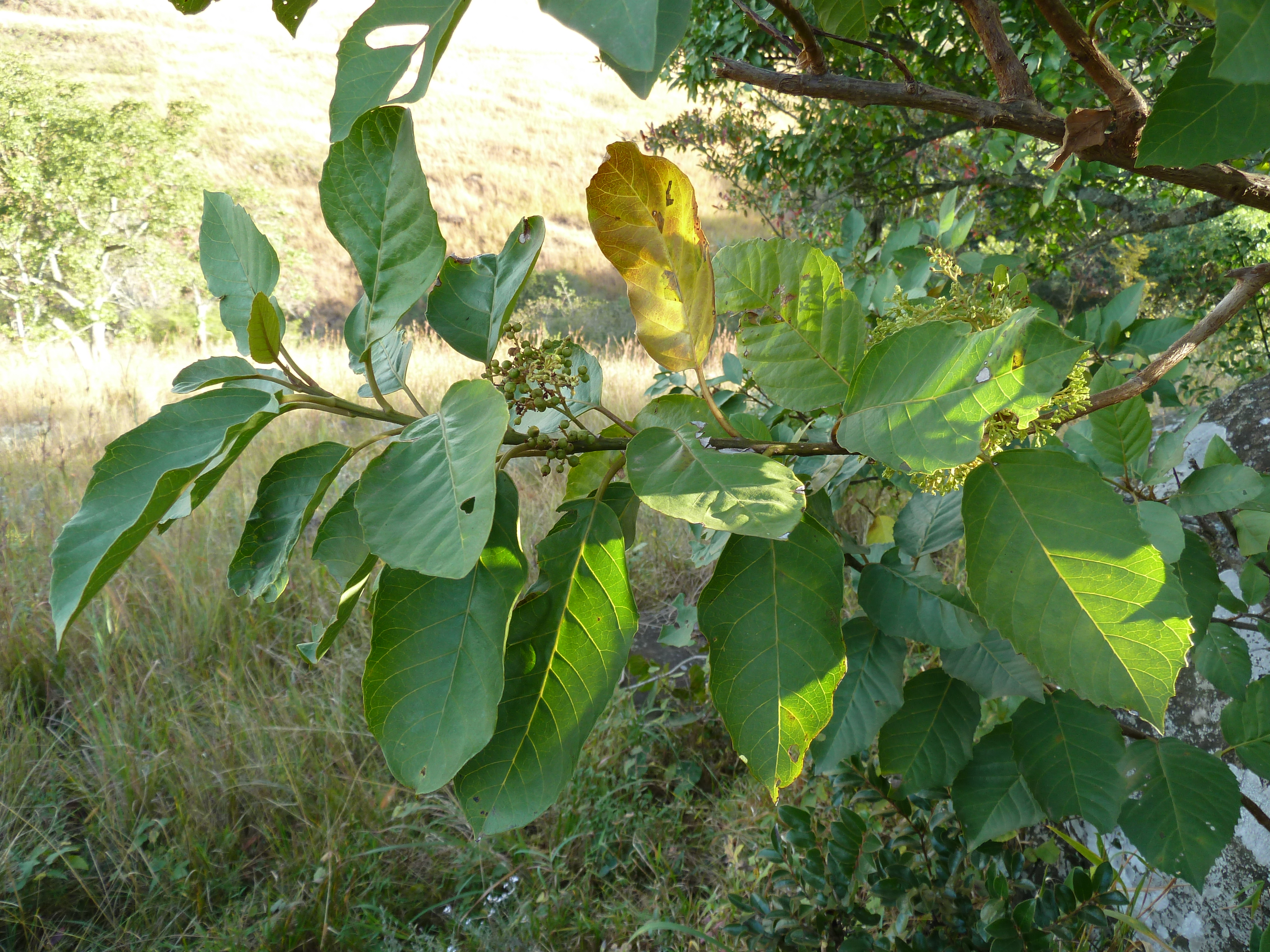
Spirally arranged leaves

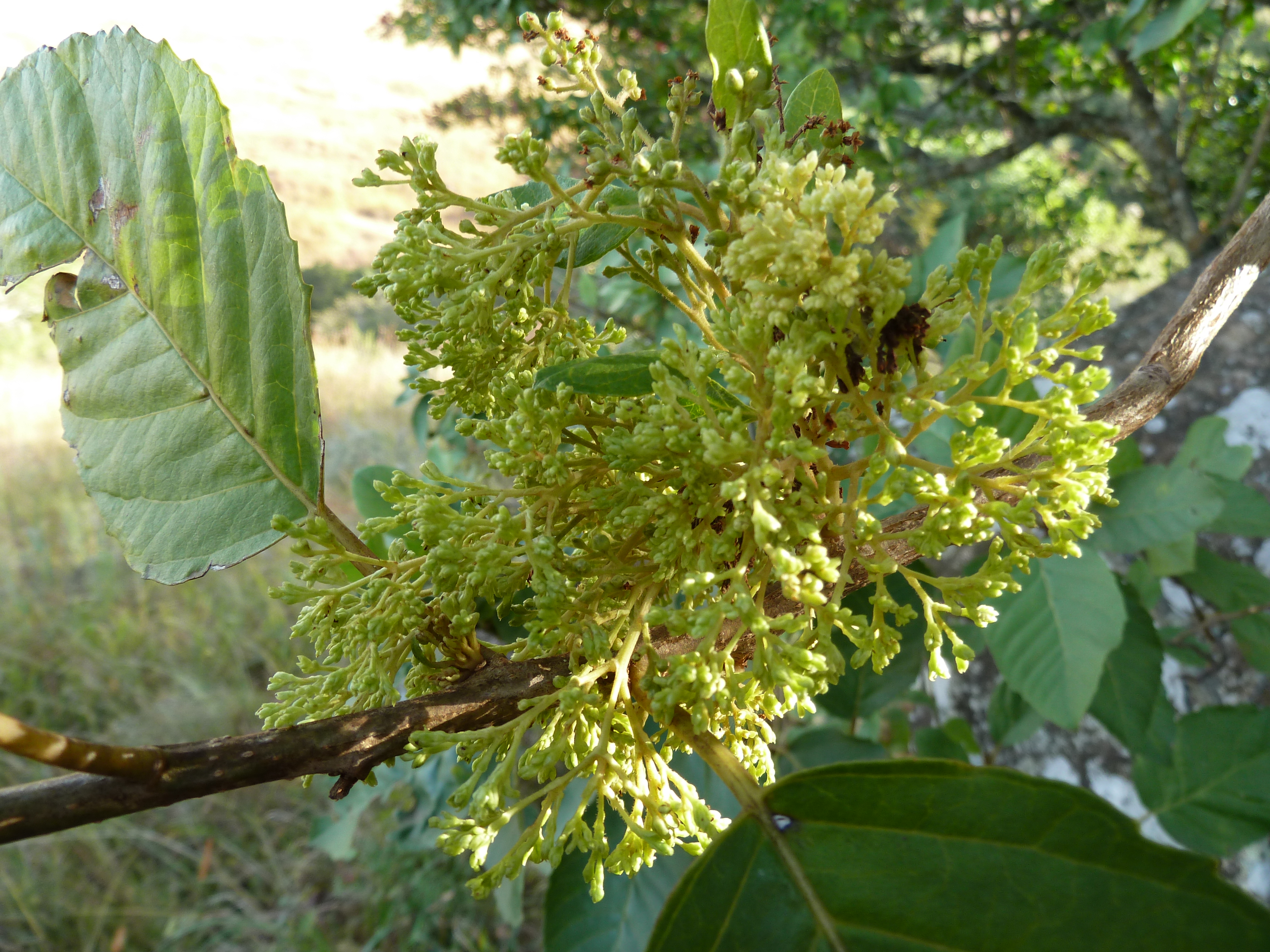
Inflorescence

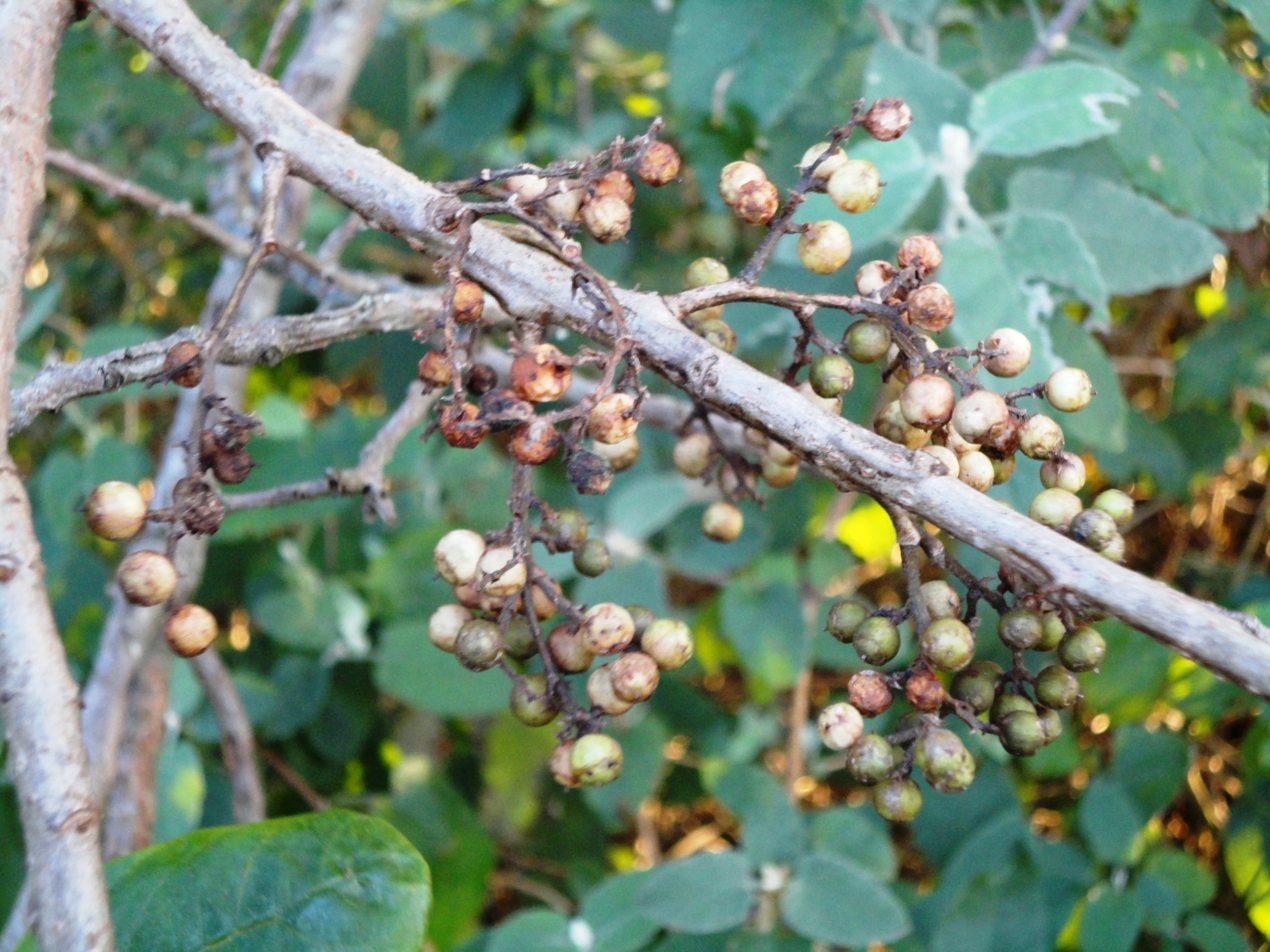
Fruit
