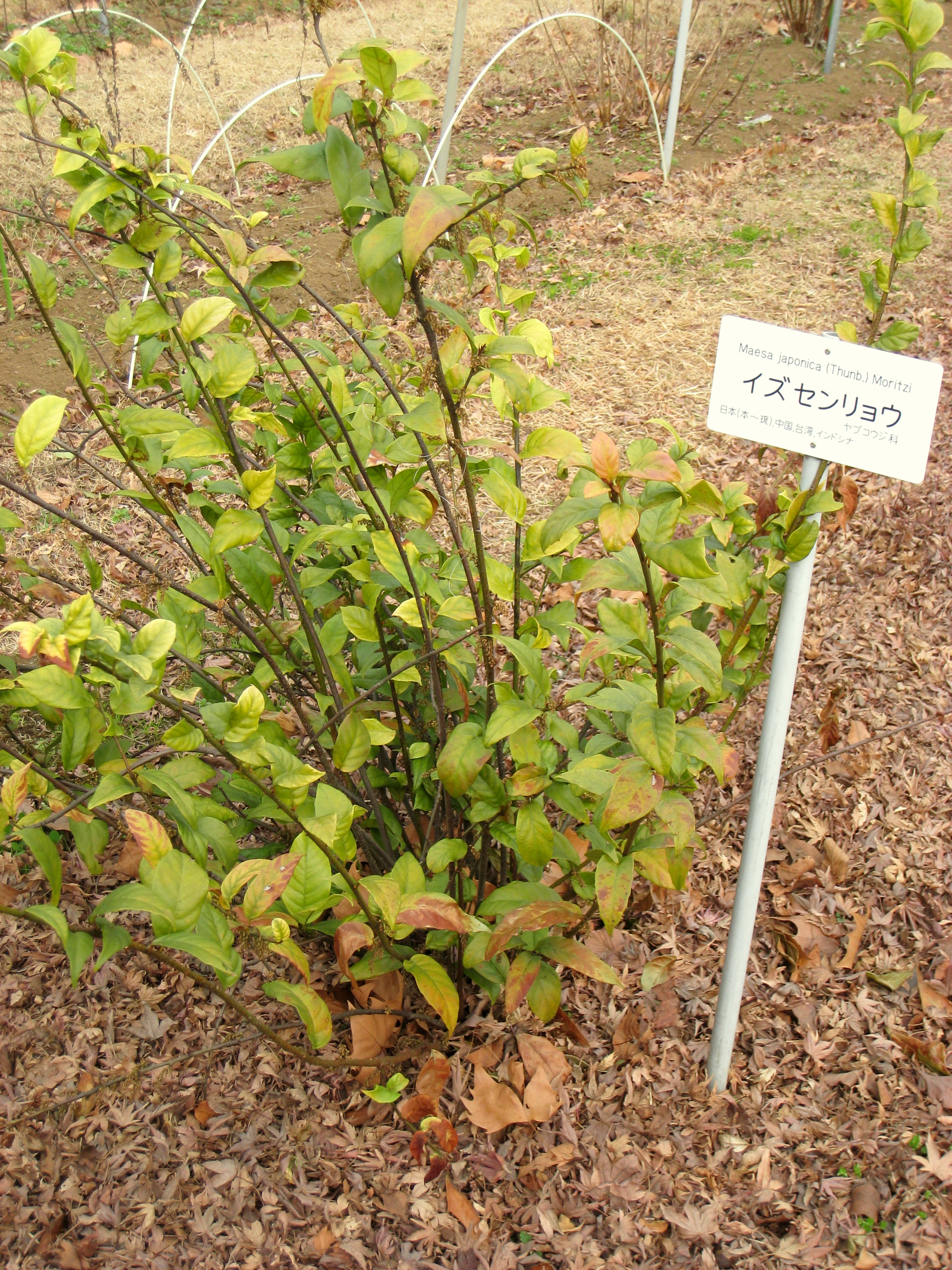
- Maesa japonica

Scientific classification
- Kingdom: Plantae
- Clade: Embryophytes
- Clade: Tracheophytes
- Clade: Angiosperms
- Clade: Eudicots
- Clade: Asterids
- Order: Ericales
- Family: Primulaceae
- Subfamily: Maesoideae; A.DC.
- Genus: Maesa; Forssk. (1775)

Type species
- Maesa lanceolata Forrsk.

Species
- 184, see text

Synonyms
- Baeobotrys J.R.Forst. & G.Forst. (1776); Cistula Noronha (1790), nom. nud.; Dartus Lour. (1790); Doraena Thunb. (1783); Siburatia Thouars (1806)

= Maesa =

Genus of flowering plants in the primrose family

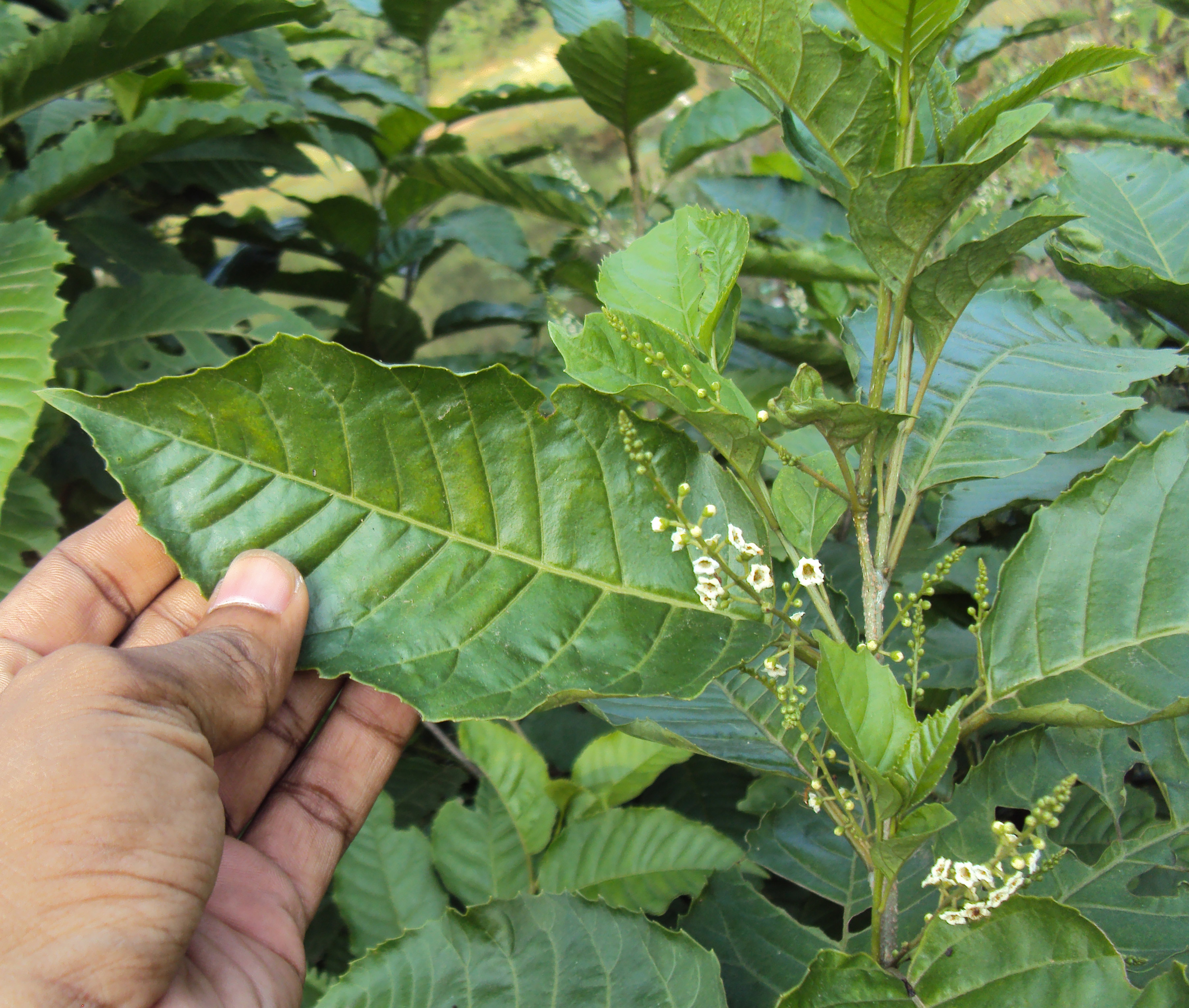
Maesa indica

Maesa is a genus of flowering plants. It is placed in the family Primulaceae, subfamily Maesoideae, for which it is the sole genus (monotypic). Previously it was placed in Myrsinaceae, or in a family of its own, Maesaceae. The species in the genus are native to tropical and subtropical Africa, Asia, and the Pacific, the majority of which occur in Malesia, New Guinea, western Asia, and the Pacific Islands.

These plants are vines, shrubs, and trees up to 12 meters (39 ft) tall.

== Selected species ==
Accepted species include: They include:

- Maesa acuminatissima Merr.
- Maesa alnifolia Harv.
- Maesa ambigua C.Y.Wu & C.Chen
- Maesa ambrymensis Guillaumin
- Maesa amplexicaulis Utteridge
- Maesa andamanica Kurz
- Maesa aneiteensis Mez
- Maesa angustibracteolata Sumanon & Utteridge
- Maesa arborea Ridl.
- Maesa argentea (Wall.) A.DC.
- Maesa argyrophylla K.Larsen & C.M.Hu
- Maesa arunachalensis G.S.Giri, S.K.Das & M.P.Nayar
- Maesa aubertii Guillaumin
- Maesa augustini (Nakai) Tuyama
- Maesa aurulenta Sumanon & Utteridge
- Maesa balansae Mez
- Maesa banksiana Guillaumin
- Maesa beamanii Utteridge
- Maesa begoniifolia Sumanon & Utteridge
- Maesa bengalensis Mez
- Maesa bennettii Mez
- Maesa bismarckiana Mez
- Maesa blumei D.Don
- Maesa brachybotrya Miq.
- Maesa brassii Sumanon & Utteridge
- Maesa brevipaniculata (C.Y.Wu & C.Chen) Pipoly & C.Chen
- Maesa brevipedicellata Sumanon & Utteridge
- Maesa calcarea Sleumer
- Maesa calophylla Pit.
- Maesa cambodiana C.M.Hu & J.E.Vidal
- Maesa carolinensis Mez
- Maesa cauliflora Kaneh. & Hatus.
- Maesa cavinervis C.Chen
- Maesa chisia Buch.-Ham. ex D.Don
- Maesa clementis Merr.
- Maesa conferta Merr.
- Maesa confusa (C.M.Hu) Pipoly & C.Chen
- Maesa consanguinea Merr.
- Maesa cordifolia Miq.
- Maesa corneri Sleumer
- Maesa corylifolia A.Gray
- Maesa costulata Miq.
- Maesa cumingii Mez
- Maesa davaensis Quisumb.
- Maesa decidua Philipson
- Maesa decipiens Utteridge
- Maesa densistriata C.Chen & C.M.Hu
- Maesa denticulata Mez
- Maesa dependens F.Muell.
- Maesa dubia (Wall.) A.DC.
- Maesa edulis C.T.White
- Maesa eramangensis Mez
- Maesa ferruginea Merr.
- Maesa flabellifera D.Wei, G.Hao & Utteridge
- Maesa forbesii Mez
- Maesa fraseriana Utteridge
- Maesa fruticosa Gibbs
- Maesa gaudichaudii A.DC.
- Maesa glomerata K.Larsen & C.M.Hu
- Maesa gracilis Utteridge
- Maesa grandiflora Mez
- Maesa grandifolia Miq.
- Maesa haenkeana Mez
- Maesa haplobotrys F.Muell.
- Maesa hengchunensis S.S.Ying
- Maesa hirtella Miq.
- Maesa hooglandii Sleumer
- Maesa hotungensis S.S.Ying
- Maesa hupehensis Rehder
- Maesa ilicifolia Ridl.
- Maesa impressinervis King & Gamble
- Maesa inculticola Utteridge
- Maesa indica (Roxb.) Sweet
- Maesa insignis Chun
- Maesa insularis Gillespie
- Maesa integrifolia Ridl.
- Maesa jaffrei M.Schmid
- Maesa japonica (Thunb.) Moritzi ex Zoll.
- Maesa junghuhniana Scheff.
- Maesa kamerunensis Mez
- Maesa kanjilalii Majumdar & G.S.Giri
- Maesa kerrii C.M.Hu & J.E.Vidal
- Maesa kivuensis Taton
- Maesa kurzii Mez
- Maesa laevis C.M.Hu & J.E.Vidal
- Maesa lanceolata Forssk.
- Maesa lancifolia Ridl.
- Maesa lanyuensis Yuen P.Yang
- Maesa latifolia A.DC.
- Maesa laxiflora Pit.
- Maesa leptobotrya Hance
- Maesa leucocarpa Blume ex Scheff.
- Maesa lineolata H.R.Fletcher
- Maesa lobuligera Mez
- Maesa loloruensis Sleumer
- Maesa longilanceolata C.Chen
- Maesa loranthifolia Mez
- Maesa lorentziana Mez
- Maesa macilenta E.Walker
- Maesa macilentoides C.Chen
- Maesa macrocarpa Scheff.
- Maesa macrophylla (Wall.) A.DC.
- Maesa macrosepala Pit.
- Maesa macrothyrsa Miq.
- Maesa malayana Utteridge
- Maesa manillensis Mez
- Maesa manipurensis Mez
- Maesa marioniae Merr.
- Maesa martiana Mez
- Maesa maxima (C.B.Clarke) Mez
- Maesa megalobotrya Merr.
- Maesa megaphylla Merr.
- Maesa megistophylla Utteridge
- Maesa membranacea A.DC.
- Maesa membranifolia Mez
- Maesa mollis (Blume) A.DC.
- Maesa montana A.DC.
- Maesa montis-wilhelmi P.Royen
- Maesa muscosa Kurz
- Maesa naumanniana Mez
- Maesa nayarii G.S.Giri & S.K.Das
- Maesa nemoralis (J.R.Forst. & G.Forst.) A.DC.
- Maesa novocaledonica Mez
- Maesa novoguineensis Scheff.
- Maesa nuda Hutch. & Dalziel
- Maesa oblanceolatifolia Sumanon & Utteridge
- Maesa oligotricha Merr.
- Maesa ovocarpa Ridl.
- Maesa pahangiana King & Gamble
- Maesa palauensis Mez
- Maesa paniculata A.DC.
- Maesa papuana Warb.
- Maesa parviflora Scheff.
- Maesa parvifolia Aug.DC.
- Maesa perlarius (Lour.) Merr.
- Maesa permollis Kurz
- Maesa persicifolia A.Gray
- Maesa pickeringii A.Gray
- Maesa pilosa Utteridge
- Maesa pilosopapuana Sumanon & Utteridge
- Maesa pipericarpa Mez
- Maesa pisocarpa Blume ex Scheff.
- Maesa platyphylla Elmer
- Maesa populifolia Mez
- Maesa procera B.C.Stone
- Maesa procumbens Utteridge
- Maesa prolatifructa Sumanon & Utteridge
- Maesa protracta F.Muell.
- Maesa pulchella Fawc.
- Maesa purpureohirsuta Kaneh. & Hatus.
- Maesa pusilliflora Sumanon & Utteridge
- Maesa racemosa (K.Schum.) Mez
- Maesa ramentacea (Roxb.) A.DC.
- Maesa reflexa Utteridge & R.M.K.Saunders
- Maesa regia Sleumer
- Maesa reinwardtii Blume ex Scheff.
- Maesa reticulata C.Y.Wu
- Maesa rheophytica Sleumer
- Maesa robinsonii Merr.
- Maesa rubiginosa Blume ex Scheff.
- Maesa ruficaulis S.Moore
- Maesa rufovillosa Mez
- Maesa rugosa C.B.Clarke
- Maesa salicifolia E.Walker
- Maesa sarasinii Mez
- Maesa sayersii Sleumer
- Maesa serratifolia Sumanon & Utteridge
- Maesa shengmushanensis S.S.Ying
- Maesa sleumeri Dhatchan. & Devanath.
- Maesa spectabilis Sleumer
- Maesa stonei Utteridge & R.M.K.Saunders
- Maesa striata Mez
- Maesa striatocarpa C.Chen
- Maesa subdendata A.DC.
- Maesa sumatrana Scheff.
- Maesa tabacifolia Mez
- Maesa tagulensis Sumanon & Utteridge
- Maesa tairukouensis S.S.Ying
- Maesa tenera Mez
- Maesa tenuifolia Mez
- Maesa tetrandra (Roxb.) A.DC.
- Maesa tomentella Mez
- Maesa truncata Sastry
- Maesa velutina Mez
- Maesa vestita Jacq.-Fél.
- Maesa villosa Mez
- Maesa virgata (Blume) A.DC.
- Maesa vitiensis Seem.
- Maesa walkeri Fosberg & Sachet
- Maesa warburgii Mez
- Maesa wardii M.P.Nayar & G.S.Giri
- Maesa welwitschii Gilg
- Maesa ziroensis G.S.Giri & G.D.Pal
