= List of Primula species =

The following species in the flowering plant genus Primula, often called primroses and cowslips, are accepted by Plants of the World Online. Over 25 books have been written on the genus.

- Primula × admontensis Gusmus ex G.C.Churchill
- Primula advena W.W.Sm.
- Primula aemula Balf.f. & Forrest
- Primula aerinantha Balf.f. & Purdom
- Primula afghanica Wendelbo
- Primula agleniana Balf.f. & Forrest
- Primula albenensis Banfi & Ferl.
- Primula alcalina Cholewa & D.M.Hend.
- Primula algida Adams
- Primula aliciae G.Taylor ex W.W.Sm.
- Primula allionii Loisel.
- Primula alpicola (W.W.Sm.) Stapf
- Primula alsophila Balf.f. & Farrer
- Primula ambita Balf.f.
- Primula amethystina Franch.
- Primula amoena M.Bieb.
- Primula angustifolia Torr.
- Primula anisodora Balf.f. & Forrest
- Primula annulata Balf.f. & Kingdon-Ward
- Primula anthemifolia G.Hao, C.M.Hu & Yuan Xu
- Primula anvilensis S.Kelso
- Primula apennina Widmer
- Primula apicicallosa D.Fang
- Primula aromatica W.W.Sm. & Forrest
- Primula arunachalensis S.K.Basak & Maiti
- Primula asarifolia H.R.Fletcher
- Primula assamica H.R.Fletcher
- Primula atrodentata W.W.Sm.
- Primula aurantiaca W.W.Sm. & Forrest
- Primula aureata H.R.Fletcher
- Primula auricula L.
- Primula auriculata Lam.
- Primula austrofrigida (K.L.Chambers) A.R.Mast & Reveal
- Primula baileyana Kingdon-Ward
- Primula baldshuanica B.Fedtsch.
- Primula barbatula W.W.Sm.
- Primula barbicalyx C.H.Wright
- Primula bathangensis Petitm.
- Primula bella Franch.
- Primula bellidifolia King ex Hook.f.
- Primula bergenioides C.M.Hu & Y.Y.Geng
- Primula × berninae A.Kern.
- Primula bhutanica H.R.Fletcher
- Primula biserrata Forrest
- Primula blandula W.W.Sm.
- Primula blattariformis Franch.
- Primula blinii H.Lév.
- Primula bomiensis F.H.Chen & C.M.Hu
- Primula × boni-auxilii Kress
- Primula boothii Craib
- Primula borealis Duby
- Primula boreiocalliantha Balf.f. & Forrest
- Primula botschantzevii Czukav. & Kovalevsk.
- Primula × bowlesii Farrer
- Primula brachystoma W.W.Sm.
- Primula bracteosa Craib
- Primula bukukunica Kovt.
- Primula bullata Franch.
- Primula bulleyana Forrest
- Primula buryana Balf.f.
- Primula caldaria W.W.Sm. & Forrest
- Primula calderiana Balf.f. & R.E.Cooper
- Primula calliantha Franch.
- Primula calthifolia W.W.Sm.
- Primula calyptrata X.Gong & R.C.Fang
- Primula candicans W.W.Sm.
- Primula capillaris N.H.Holmgren & A.H.Holmgren
- Primula capitata Hook.
- Primula capitellata Boiss.
- Primula cardioeides W.W.Sm. & H.R.Fletcher
- Primula carniolica Jacq.
- Primula carolinehenryae S.O'Brien
- Primula × caruelii Porta
- Primula caulifera C.M.Hu
- Primula cavaleriei Petitm.
- Primula caveana W.W.Sm.
- Primula cawdoriana Kingdon-Ward
- Primula celsiiformis Balf.f.
- Primula centellifolia G.Hao, C.M.Hu & Y.Xu
- Primula cerina H.R.Fletcher
- Primula cernua Franch.
- Primula chamaedoron W.W.Sm.
- Primula chamaethauma W.W.Sm.
- Primula chapaensis Gagnep.
- Primula chartacea Franch.
- Primula chasmophila (Balf.f. ex Hutch.) Balf.f. ex Hutch.
- Primula chienii W.P.Fang
- Primula chimingiana G.Hao, S.Yuan & D.X.Zhang
- Primula chionantha Balf.f. & Forrest
- Primula chionata W.W.Sm.
- Primula chionogenes H.R.Fletcher
- Primula chrysochlora Balf.f. & Kingdon-Ward
- Primula chrysostoma O.Schwarz
- Primula chumbiensis W.W.Sm.
- Primula chungensis Balf.f. & Kingdon-Ward
- Primula cicutariifolia Pax
- Primula cinerascens Franch.
- Primula clarkei G.Watt
- Primula clevelandii (Greene) A.R.Mast & Reveal
- Primula clusiana Tausch
- Primula clutterbuckii Kingdon-Ward
- Primula cockburniana Hemsl.
- Primula coelata Stapf
- Primula coerulea Forrest
- Primula comata H.R.Fletcher
- Primula comberi W.W.Sm.
- Primula concholoba Stapf & Sealy
- Primula concinna G.Watt
- Primula conjugens (Greene) A.R.Mast & Reveal
- Primula conspersa Balf.f. & Purdom
- Primula cooperi Balf.f.
- Primula cordifolia Rupr.
- Primula × coronata Porta
- Primula cortusoides L.
- Primula coryphaea Balf.f. & Kingdon-Ward
- Primula cottia Widmer
- Primula crassa Hand.-Mazz.
- Primula crassifolia Lehm.
- Primula crispata Balf.f. & W.W.Sm.
- Primula crocifolia Pax & K.Hoffm.
- Primula cuneifolia Ledeb.
- Primula cunninghamii King ex Craib
- Primula cusickiana (A.Gray) A.Gray
- Primula daonensis (Leyb.) Leyb.
- Primula darialica Rupr.
- Primula davidii Franch.
- Primula davisii W.W.Sm.
- Primula deflexa Duthie
- Primula dejuniana G.Hao, C.M.Hu & Yuan Xu
- Primula densa Balf.f.
- Primula denticulata Sm.
- Primula denticuloides Y.J.Nasir
- Primula deorum Velen.
- Primula × deschmannii Ingw.
- Primula deuteronana Craib
- Primula diantha Bureau & Franch.
- Primula dickieana G.Watt
- Primula dictyophylla W.W.Sm.
- Primula × digenea A.Kern.
- Primula × discolor Leyb.
- Primula divaricata F.H.Chen & C.M.Hu
- Primula dongchuanensis Z.K.Wu & Yuan Huang
- Primula drummondiana Craib
- Primula dryadifolia Franch.
- Primula × dschungdienensis Hand.-Mazz.
- Primula duclouxii Petitm.
- Primula dueckelmannii Gilli
- Primula dumicola W.W.Sm. & Forrest
- Primula × dumoulinii Stein
- Primula duthieana Balf.f. & W.W.Sm.
- Primula eburnea Balf.f. & R.E.Cooper
- Primula edelbergii O.Schwarz
- Primula efarinosa Pax
- Primula effusa W.W.Sm. & Forrest
- Primula egaliksensis Wormsk.
- Primula elatior (L.) Hill
- Primula × elisabethae Sünd.
- Primula elizabethiae Ludlow ex W.W.Sm.
- Primula elliptica Royle
- Primula elongata G.Watt
- Primula epilithica F.H.Chen & C.M.Hu
- Primula epilosa Craib
- Primula erosa (Wall. ex Duby) Regel
- Primula erratica W.W.Sm.
- Primula erythrocarpa Craib
- Primula × escheri Brügger
- Primula esquirolii Petitm.
- Primula euchaites W.W.Sm.
- Primula eugeniae Fed.
- Primula euosma Craib
- Primula euprepes (W.W.Sm.) A.J.Richards
- Primula eximia Greene
- Primula faberi Oliv.
- Primula × facchinii Schott
- Primula fagosa Balf.f. & Craib
- Primula falcifolia Kingdon-Ward
- Primula fangii F.H.Chen & C.M.Hu
- Primula fangingensis F.H.Chen & C.M.Hu
- Primula farinifolia Rupr.
- Primula farinosa L.
- Primula farreriana Balf.f.
- Primula fasciculata Balf.f. & Kingdon-Ward
- Primula fassettii A.R.Mast & Reveal
- Primula fea Kingdon-Ward
- Primula fedtschenkoi Regel
- Primula fenghwaiana C.M.Hu & G.Hao
- Primula fernaldiana W.W.Sm.
- Primula filchnerae R.Knuth
- Primula filipes G.Watt
- Primula fimbriata Wall. ex Duby
- Primula firmipes Balf.f. & Forrest
- Primula fistulosa Turkev.
- Primula flabellifera W.W.Sm.
- Primula flaccida N.P.Balakr.
- Primula flagellaris W.W.Sm.
- Primula flava Maxim.
- Primula flexuosa Turkev.
- Primula × floerkeana Schrad.
- Primula floribunda Wall.
- Primula florindae Kingdon-Ward
- Primula fragrans A.R.Mast & Reveal
- Primula frenchii (Vasey) A.R.Mast & Reveal
- Primula frigida (Cham. & Schltdl.) A.R.Mast & Reveal
- Primula frondosa Janka
- Primula gambeliana G.Watt
- Primula garhwalica (Balodi & S.Singh) K.K.Khanna & An.Kumar
- Primula gaubaeana Bornm.
- Primula gemmifera Batalin
- Primula geraniifolia Hook.f.
- Primula geranophylla Kovalevsk.
- Primula giraldiana Pax
- Primula glabra Klatt
- Primula glandulifera Balf.f. & W.W.Sm.
- Primula glaucescens Moretti
- Primula glomerata Pax
- Primula glutinosa Wulfen
- Primula × goebelii A.Kern.
- Primula gracilenta Dunn
- Primula gracilipes Craib
- Primula graminifolia Pax & K.Hoffm.
- Primula grandis Trautv.
- Primula griffithii (Watt) Pax
- Primula halleri J.F.Gmel.
- Primula handeliana W.W.Sm. & Forrest
- Primula hazarica Duthie
- Primula × heeri Brügger
- Primula helodoxa Balf.f.
- Primula hendersonii (A.Gray) A.R.Mast & Reveal
- Primula henrici Bureau & Franch.
- Primula heterochroma Stapf
- Primula heucherifolia Franch.
- Primula hidakana Miyabe & Kudô
- Primula hilaris W.W.Sm.
- Primula hirsuta All.
- Primula hoffmanniana W.W.Sm.
- Primula hoi W.P.Fang
- Primula homogama F.H.Chen & C.M.Hu
- Primula hongshanensis D.W.H.Rankin, Z.D.Fang & H.Sun
- Primula hookeri G.Watt
- Primula huashanensis F.H.Chen & C.M.Hu
- Primula hubeiensis Xin W.Li
- Primula × hugueninii Brügger
- Primula hunanensis G.Hao, C.M.Hu & X.L.Yu
- Primula hydrocotylifolia G.Hao, C.M.Hu & Yuan Xu
- Primula hylobia W.W.Sm.
- Primula hypoleuca Hand.-Mazz.
- Primula ianthina Balf.f. & Cave
- Primula iljinskii Fed.
- Primula inayatii Duthie
- Primula incana M.E.Jones
- Primula inopinata H.R.Fletcher
- Primula intanoensis T.Yamaz.
- Primula integrifolia L.
- Primula interjacens F.H.Chen
- Primula intricata Gren. & Godr.
- Primula involucrata (Raf.) Link & Otto ex Sweet
- Primula ioessa W.W.Sm.
- Primula irregularis Craib
- Primula jaffreyana King
- Primula japonica A.Gray
- Primula jeffreyi (Van Houtte) A.R.Mast & Reveal
- Primula jesoana Miq.
- Primula jigmediana W.W.Sm.
- Primula jiugongshanensis J.W.Shao
- Primula jucunda W.W.Sm.
- Primula × judicariensis Beyer
- Primula juliae Kusn.
- Primula × juribella Sünd.
- Primula kaufmanniana Regel
- Primula kawasimae H.Hara
- Primula khasiana Balf.f. & W.W.Sm.
- Primula kialensis Franch.
- Primula kingii G.Watt
- Primula kisoana Miq.
- Primula kitaibeliana Schott
- Primula klattii N.P.Balakr.
- Primula klaveriana Forrest
- Primula knorringiana Fed.
- Primula knuthiana Pax
- Primula × kolbeana Stein
- Primula × kraettliana Brügger
- Primula kwangtungensis W.W.Sm.
- Primula kweichouensis W.W.Sm.
- Primula lacerata W.W.Sm.
- Primula laciniata Pax & K.Hoffm.
- Primula lactucoides F.H.Chen & C.M.Hu
- Primula latifolia Lapeyr.
- Primula latiloba (A.Gray) A.R.Mast & Reveal
- Primula latisecta W.W.Sm.
- Primula laurentiana Fernald
- Primula laxiuscula W.W.Sm.
- Primula × lebliana Gusmus ex Kolb
- Primula leptophylla Craib
- Primula levicalyx C.M.Hu & Z.R.Xu
- Primula lihengiana C.M.Hu & R.Li
- Primula lilacina A.J.Richards
- Primula limbata Balf.f. & Forrest
- Primula listeri King ex Hook.f.
- Primula lithophila F.H.Chen & C.M.Hu
- Primula littledalei Balf.f. & G.Watt
- Primula × loiseleurii Sünd.
- Primula longipes Freyn & Sint.
- Primula longiscapa Ledeb.
- Primula lungchiensis W.P.Fang
- Primula lutea Vill.
- Primula luteoflora X.F.Gao & W.B.Ju
- Primula luteola Rupr.
- Primula macrocarpa Maxim.
- Primula macrophylla D.Don
- Primula magellanica Lehm.
- Primula malacoides Franch.
- Primula mallophylla Balf.f.
- Primula malvacea Franch.
- Primula marginata Curtis
- Primula matthioli (L.) V.A.Richt.
- Primula maximowiczii Regel
- Primula mazurenkoae A.P.Khokhr.
- Primula meadia (L.) A.R.Mast & Reveal
- Primula × media Peterm.
- Primula megalocarpa H.Hara
- Primula megaseifolia Boiss. & Balansa
- Primula meiantha Balf.f. & W.W.Sm.
- Primula meiotera (W.W.Sm. & H.R.Fletcher) C.M.Hu
- Primula melanantha (Franch.) C.M.Hu
- Primula melanodonta W.W.Sm.
- Primula merrilliana Schltr.
- Primula meyeri Rupr.
- Primula mianyangensis G.Hao & C.M.Hu
- Primula minima L.
- Primula minkwitziae W.W.Sm.
- Primula minor Balf.f. & Kingdon-Ward
- Primula minutissima Jacquem. ex Duby
- Primula mishmiensis Kingdon-Ward
- Primula mistassinica Michx.
- Primula miyabeana T.Itô & Kawak.
- Primula modesta Bisset & S.Moore
- Primula mollis Nutt. ex Hook.
- Primula monticola (Hand.-Mazz.) F.H.Chen & C.M.Hu
- Primula × morissetii Lepage
- Primula morsheadiana Kingdon-Ward
- Primula moupinensis Franch.
- Primula munroi Lindl.
- Primula × murbeckii Lindq.
- Primula × muretiana Moritzi
- Primula muscarioides Hemsl.
- Primula muscoides Hook.f. ex G.Watt
- Primula nana Wall.
- Primula nanocapitata Balf.f. & W.W.Sm. ex S.K.Basak & Maiti
- Primula neurocalyx Franch.
- Primula nghialoensis D.W.H.Rankin
- Primula ninguida W.W.Sm.
- Primula nipponica Yatabe
- Primula nivalis Pall.
- Primula normaniana Kingdon-Ward
- Primula nutans Georgi
- Primula nutantiflora Hemsl.
- Primula obconica Hance
- Primula obliqua W.W.Sm.
- Primula × obovata Huter
- Primula obtusifolia Royle
- Primula occlusa W.W.Sm.
- Primula odontica W.W.Sm.
- Primula odontocalyx (Franch.) Pax
- Primula olgae Regel
- Primula optata Farrer ex Balf.f.
- Primula orbicularis Hemsl.
- Primula oreodoxa Franch.
- Primula ovalifolia Franch.
- Primula oxygraphidifolia W.W.Sm. & Kingdon-Ward
- Primula palinuri Petagna
- Primula palmata Hand.-Mazz.
- Primula pamirica Fed.
- Primula parryi A.Gray
- Primula partschiana Pax
- Primula pauciflora (Durand) A.R.Mast & Reveal
- Primula pauliana W.W.Sm. & Forrest
- Primula pedemontana E.Thomas ex Gaudin
- Primula pelargoniifolia G.Hao, C.M.Hu & Z.Y.Liu
- Primula pellucida Franch.
- Primula pengzhouensis C.M.Hu, G.Hao & Y.Xu
- Primula persimilis G.Hao, C.M.Hu & Y.Xu
- Primula petelotii W.W.Sm.
- Primula petiolaris Wall.
- Primula petrocallis F.H.Chen & C.M.Hu
- Primula pinnata Popov & Fed.
- Primula pinnatifida Franch.
- Primula poetica (L.F.Hend.) A.R.Mast & Reveal
- Primula poissonii Franch.
- Primula polonensis Kingdon-Ward
- Primula poluninii H.R.Fletcher
- Primula × polyantha Mill.
- Primula polyneura Franch.
- Primula praeflorens F.H.Chen & C.M.Hu
- Primula praenitens Ker Gawl.
- Primula praetermissa W.W.Sm.
- Primula prenantha Balf.f. & W.W.Sm.
- Primula prevernalis F.H.Chen & C.M.Hu
- Primula primulina (Spreng.) H.Hara
- Primula prolifera Wall.
- Primula pseudodenticulata Pax
- Primula pseudoelatior Kusn.
- Primula pskemensis Lazkov
- Primula × pubescens Jacq.
- Primula pulchella Franch.
- Primula pulchra G.Watt
- Primula pullulatrix O.Schwarz
- Primula pulverulenta Duthie
- Primula pumilio Maxim.
- Primula purdomii Craib
- Primula pycnoloba Bureau & Franch.
- Primula qiupuensis J.W.Shao
- Primula ramzanae W.W.Sm. & H.R.Fletcher
- Primula ranunculoides F.H.Chen
- Primula rebeccae A.J.Richards
- Primula recubariensis Prosser & Scorteg.
- Primula reflexa Petitm.
- Primula reidii Duthie
- Primula reinii Franch. & Sav.
- Primula renifolia Volgunov
- Primula repentina O.Schwarz
- Primula reptans Hook.f. ex G.Watt
- Primula reticulata Wall.
- Primula rhodochroa W.W.Sm.
- Primula rimicola W.W.Sm.
- Primula rockii W.W.Sm.
- Primula rosea Royle
- Primula rotundifolia Wall.
- Primula rubicunda H.R.Fletcher
- Primula rubifolia C.M.Hu
- Primula rugosa N.P.Balakr.
- Primula runcinata W.W.Sm. & H.R.Fletcher ex C.M.Hu
- Primula rupestris Balf.f. & Farrer
- Primula rupicola Balf.f. & Forrest
- Primula ruprechtii Kusn.
- Primula rusbyi Greene
- Primula russeola Balf.f. & Forrest
- Primula × salomonii Sünd.
- Primula sandemaniana W.W.Sm.
- Primula × santii Gola
- Primula sapphirina Hook.f. & Thomson ex G.Watt
- Primula saturata W.W.Sm. & H.R.Fletcher
- Primula saxatilis Kom.
- Primula scandinavica Bruun
- Primula scapigera (Hook.f.) Craib
- Primula schlagintweitiana Pax
- Primula × schottii Sünd.
- Primula sciophila Balf.f. & Kingdon-Ward
- Primula scopulicola G.Hao, C.M.Hu & Y.Xu
- Primula scotica Hook.
- Primula secundiflora Franch.
- Primula septemloba Franch.
- Primula serrata Georgi
- Primula sertulum Franch.
- Primula sessilis Royle ex Craib
- Primula sharmae H.R.Fletcher
- Primula sherriffiae W.W.Sm.
- Primula siamensis Craib
- Primula sieboldii É.Morren
- Primula sikkimensis Hook.
- Primula silaensis Petitm.
- Primula sinoexscapa C.M.Hu
- Primula sinolisteri Balf.f.
- Primula sinomollis Balf.f.
- Primula sinoplantaginea Balf.f.
- Primula sinuata Franch.
- Primula siphonantha W.W.Sm.
- Primula smithiana Craib
- Primula soldanelloides G.Watt
- Primula sonchifolia Franch.
- Primula soongii F.H.Chen & C.M.Hu
- Primula sorachiana Miyabe & Tatew.
- Primula souliei Franch.
- Primula spathulifolia Craib
- Primula spectabilis Tratt.
- Primula specuicola Rydb.
- Primula spicata Franch.
- Primula standleyana A.R.Mast & Reveal
- Primula × steinii Obrist ex Stein
- Primula stenocalyx Maxim.
- Primula stenodonta Balf.f. ex W.W.Sm. & H.R.Fletcher
- Primula stirtoniana G.Watt
- Primula stricta Hornem.
- Primula strumosa Balf.f. & R.E.Cooper
- Primula stuartii Wall.
- Primula × sturii Schott ex Kolb
- Primula subalpina (Eastw.) A.R.Mast & Reveal
- Primula subpyrenaica Aymerich, L.Sáez & López-Alvarado
- Primula subularia W.W.Sm.
- Primula suffrutescens A.Gray
- Primula sunhangii T.Deng, D.G.Zhang & Jiao Sun
- Primula szechuanica Pax
- Primula takedana Tatew.
- Primula taliensis Forrest
- Primula tangutica Duthie
- Primula tanneri King
- Primula tanupoda Balf.f. & W.W.Sm.
- Primula tardiflora (C.M.Hu) C.M.Hu
- Primula tayloriana H.R.Fletcher
- Primula tenella King ex G.Watt
- Primula tenuiloba (G.Watt) Pax
- Primula tenuipes F.H.Chen & C.M.Hu
- Primula tenuituba C.M.Hu & Y.Y.Geng
- Primula tetrandra (Suksd.) A.R.Mast & Reveal
- Primula thearosa Kingdon-Ward
- Primula tibetica G.Watt
- Primula tongolensis Franch.
- Primula tosaensis Yatabe
- Primula tournefortii Rupr.
- Primula tridentifera F.H.Chen & C.M.Hu
- Primula triloba Balf.f. & Forrest
- Primula tsariensis W.W.Sm.
- Primula tschuktschorum Kjellm.
- Primula tsiangii W.W.Sm.
- Primula tsongpenii H.R.Fletcher
- Primula turkeviczii V.V.Byalt
- Primula tyrolensis Schott
- Primula tzetsouensis Petitm.
- Primula umbratilis Balf.f. & R.E.Cooper
- Primula undulifolia G.Hao, C.M.Hu & Y.Xu
- Primula urticifolia Maxim.
- Primula utahensis (N.H.Holmgren) A.R.Mast & Reveal
- Primula vaginata G.Watt
- Primula valentinae Fed.
- Primula valentiniana Hand.-Mazz.
- Primula × vallarsae Prosser & Scorteg.
- Primula vallicola Y.Xu, G.Hao & C.M.Hu
- Primula × varians Sünd.
- Primula veitchiana Petitm.
- Primula × venusta Host
- Primula × venzoides Huter ex Venzo
- Primula veris L.
- Primula verticillata Forssk.
- Primula vialii Delavay ex Franch.
- Primula villosa Wulfen
- Primula vilmoriniana Petitm.
- Primula violacea W.W.Sm. & Kingdon-Ward
- Primula violaris W.W.Sm. & H.R.Fletcher
- Primula virginis H.Lév.
- Primula vulgaris Huds.
- Primula waddellii Balf.f. & W.W.Sm.
- Primula walshii Craib
- Primula waltonii G.Watt ex Balf.f.
- Primula wangii F.H.Chen & C.M.Hu
- Primula warshenewskiana B.Fedtsch.
- Primula watsonii Dunn
- Primula wattii King ex G.Watt
- Primula wawushanica G.Hao, C.M.Hu & Yuan Xu
- Primula × weldeniana (A.Kern.) Dalla Torre & Sarnth.
- Primula wenshanensis F.H.Chen & C.M.Hu
- Primula × wettsteinii Wiedem.
- Primula whitei W.W.Sm.
- Primula wigramiana W.W.Sm.
- Primula wilsonii Dunn
- Primula wollastonii Balf.f.
- Primula woodwardii Balf.f.
- Primula woonyoungiana W.P.Fang
- Primula wulfeniana Schott
- Primula xanthopa Balf.f. & R.E.Cooper
- Primula youngeriana W.W.Sm.
- Primula yunnanensis Franch.
- Primula yuparensis Takeda
- Primula zhui Y.H.Tan & B.Yang
