= Viola frank-smithii =

Conservation status
- Critically Imperiled (NatureServe)

Scientific classification
- Kingdom: Plantae
- Clade: Tracheophytes
- Clade: Angiosperms
- Clade: Eudicots
- Clade: Rosids
- Order: Malpighiales
- Family: Violaceae
- Genus: Viola
- Species: V. frank-smithii

Binomial name
- Viola frank-smithii N.H.Holmgren

Species of flowering plant

Viola frank-smithii is a rare species of Violet known by the common name Frank Smith's violet. It is endemic to Utah in the United States, where it is known only from Logan Canyon in the Bear River Range in Cache County.

This perennial herb produces a stem few centimeters long, which is surrounded by the withered leaves of previous seasons and new leaves, which are heart-shaped. The flower is pale purple except for the lowest petal, which is greenish. Blooming occurs in May and June.

This plant grows on vertical limestone cliffs, often in spots shaded by Douglas-fir (Pseudotsuga menziesii), Rocky Mountain maple (Acer glabrum), and bigtooth maple (A. grandidentatum). Other plants in the habitat include pink alumroot (Heuchera rubescens), mat rock spiraea (Petrophyton caespitosum), narrowleaf wildparsley (Musineon lineare), Maguire's primrose (Primula cusickiana var. maguirei), Cronquist's fleabane (Erigeron cronquistii), cutleaf mountain mahogany (Cercocarpus ledifolius), Watson's prickly phlox (Leptodactylon watsonii), bluebells (Mertensia oblongifolia), and various mosses.
