= Coleophora nubivagella =

Scientific classification
- Kingdom: Animalia
- Phylum: Arthropoda
- Clade: Pancrustacea
- Class: Insecta
- Order: Lepidoptera
- Family: Coleophoridae
- Genus: Coleophora
- Species: C. nubivagella

Binomial name
- Coleophora nubivagella Zeller, 1849

Synonyms
- Coleophora lineariella Zeller, 1849; Coleophora fulvosquamella Herrich-Schäffer, 1855; Coleophora prinziella Krone, 1913; Coleophora sociella Müller-Rutz, 1920

Species of moth

Coleophora nubivagella is a moth of the family Coleophoridae. It is found from Germany and Poland to the Pyrenees, Italy, North Macedonia and Romania.

The larvae feed on Anthyllis vulneraria, Anthyllis vulneraria alpestris, Arenaria ciliata, Cerastium alpinum lanatum, Cerastium arvense, Cerastium arvense, Cerastium glandulosum, Dianthus myrtinervius, Dianthus plumarius, Dianthus pyrenaicus, Dryas octopetala, Gypsophila repens, Minuartia austriaca, Minuartia setacea, Primula auricula, Primula minima, Saponaria ocymoides, Silene acaulis, Silene pusilla, Silene saxifraga and Silene vulgaris. Larvae can be found from autumn to June.
