= Primula ciliata =

Primula ciliata can refer to:

- Primula ciliata Moretti, a synonym of Primula auricula L.
- Primula ciliata Schrank, a synonym of Primula hirsuta All. subsp. hirsuta
