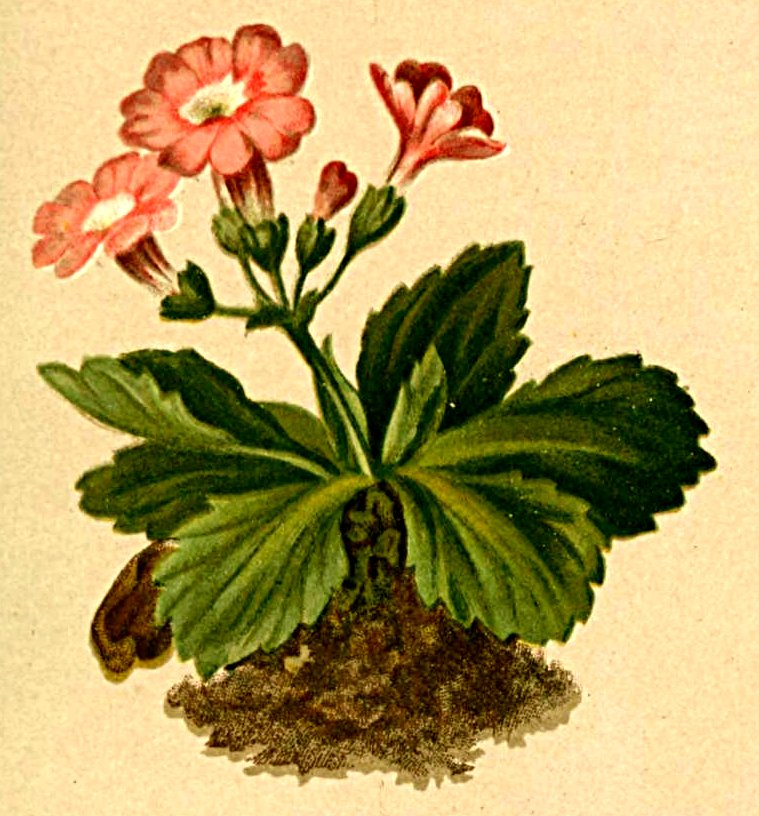

Scientific classification
- Kingdom: Plantae
- Clade: Embryophytes
- Clade: Tracheophytes
- Clade: Angiosperms
- Clade: Eudicots
- Clade: Asterids
- Order: Ericales
- Family: Primulaceae
- Genus: Primula
- Species: P. daonensis

Binomial name
- Primula daonensis (Leyb.) Leyb.

= Primula daonensis =

Species of flowering plant

Primula daonensis is a species of Primula within the family Primulaceae.

== Description ==
Primula daonensis can grow up to 9 cm tall when in flower. Flowers possess notched petal lobes, which are reddish pink or lilac in colour and stand upon a stem. Flowers usually possess a white stellate eye. The leaves of are olive green in colour with reddish edges. They are narrow and oblanceolate and form a basal rosette at the base of the plant. Leaves are also toothed towards the tip and are somewhat sticky due to the presence of glandular hairs.

== Distribution ==
This species is found within the Alps mountain range, where populations exist in both the east-central and eastern part of the region. P. daonensis is native to the countries of Austria, Italy and Switzerland.

== Habitat ==
Primula daonensis grows in alpine pastures in acidic soils. Usually found in areas with a lot of granite rock. P. daonensis will grow in rock crevices and on rocky slopes. It inhabits mountainous habitat at elevations ranging from 1500 to 3000 meters above sea level.

== Ecology ==
Primula daonensis and Primula hirsuta both grow within the Alps mountain range, however P. hirsuta grows in areas of calcareous, alkaline rock, while P. daonensis replaces it in areas of acidic rock such as granite.

Hybrids are known to occur naturally in the wild between P. daonensis and: Primula auricula, Primula latifolia, Primula hirsuta and Primula minima.
