= Primula × admontensis =

Scientific classification
- Kingdom: Plantae
- Clade: Tracheophytes
- Clade: Angiosperms
- Clade: Eudicots
- Clade: Asterids
- Order: Ericales
- Family: Primulaceae
- Genus: Primula
- Species: P. × admontensis

Binomial name
- Primula × admontensis Gusmus ex G.C.Churchill

Synonyms
- Primula × lempergii Buxb. 1937

Hybrid species of flowering plant

Primula × admontensis is a hybrid species of flowering plant within the genus Primula and family Primulaceae. This species originates from the hybridisation of Primula auricula and Primula clusiana. This plant is native to Austria, where it can be found inhabiting subalpine habitat within the Northeastern Alps mountain range.

== Description ==
Primula × admontensis can be differentiated from the parent species Primula clusiana by the fact that the hybrid possesses clearly visible toothed leaf margins above the middle of the leaf.
