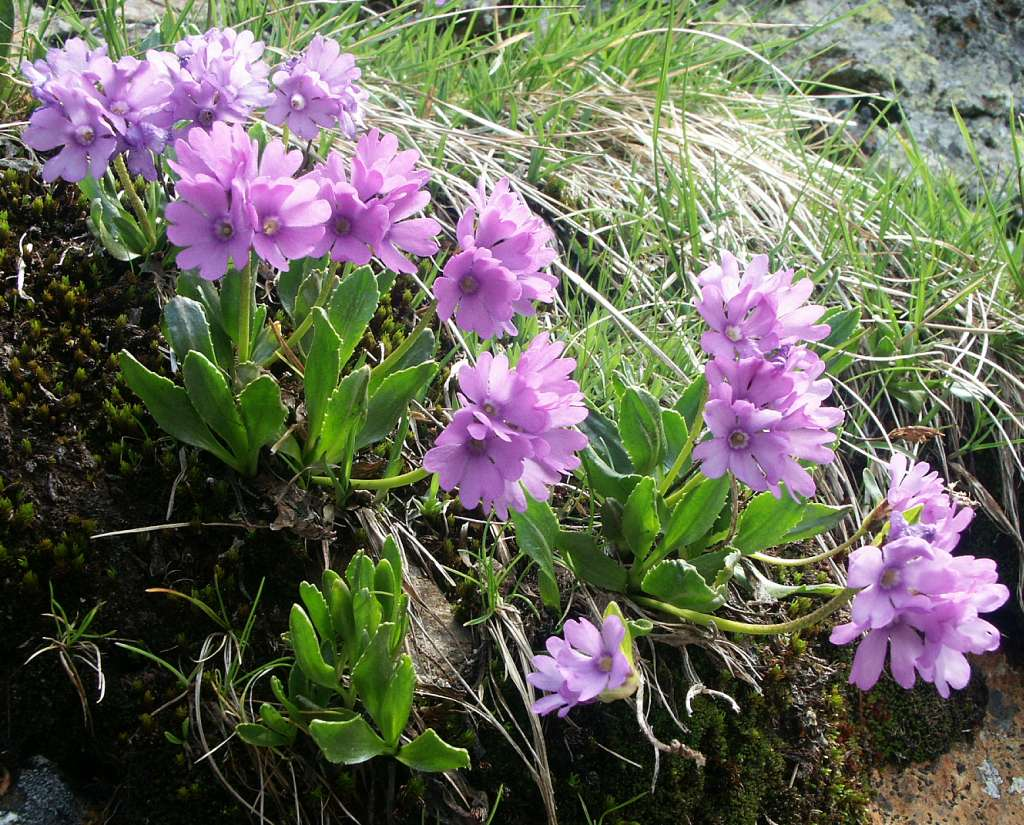

Scientific classification
- Kingdom: Plantae
- Clade: Tracheophytes
- Clade: Angiosperms
- Clade: Eudicots
- Clade: Asterids
- Order: Ericales
- Family: Primulaceae
- Genus: Primula
- Species: P. glutinosa

Binomial name
- Primula glutinosa Wulfen

Synonyms
- Aretia glutinosa (Wulfen) Link; Auricula glutinosa (Wulfen) Spach; Auricula-ursi glutinosa (Wulfen) Soják

= Primula glutinosa =

Species of flowering plant

Primula glutinosa, also known as the sticky primrose, is a species of flowering plant within the family Primulaceae.

== Description ==
Primula glutinosa is a deciduous, herbaceous perennial. Growing around 10 cm tall. Plants flower in early summer, with clusters of purplish-blue flowers. Leaves are smooth, lanceolate to wedge shaped and possess a serrated margin. Plants possess many glandular hairs, which lead to its common name as the "sticky" primrose.

== Distribution and habitat ==
Primula glutinosa can be found growing in the Central and Eastern Alps mountain range. It is native to the countries of Austria, Bosnia, Italy, Switzerland and Slovenia.

P. glutinosa has a preference for heavy acidic soils and can be often found growing on colder north facing mountain slopes where snow remains later into the season. The species occurs often in species poor habitat at altitudes ranging from 2000 to 3100 meters above sea level.

== Cultivation ==
Primula glutinosa can be a difficult species to grow due to the fact it seldom flowers in cultivation. The species requires cool, damp conditions in acidic soils. The species cannot tolerate waterlogged soil or lime. Propagation through division is possible, however the species is prone to pests such as aphids.

== Hybridization ==
Primula glutinosa and P. minima commonly hybridize in the wild to produce fully fertile offspring. Due to this hybridization it can be difficult in some areas to find individuals typical of either species. In some localities of the Timmelsjoch, Otztaler Alps large populations of hybrids occur, with very little P. glutinosa.

The hybrid offspring Primula × floerkiana is much easier to raise in cultivation, however many possess dull coloured flowers compared to P. glutinosa.
