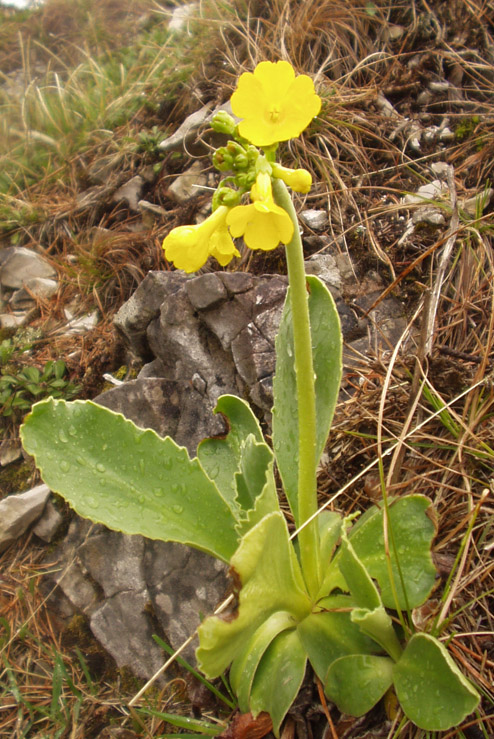

Scientific classification
- Kingdom: Plantae
- Clade: Tracheophytes
- Clade: Angiosperms
- Clade: Eudicots
- Clade: Asterids
- Order: Ericales
- Family: Primulaceae
- Genus: Primula
- Species: P. lutea

Binomial name
- Primula lutea Vill.

= Primula lutea =

Species of flowering plant

Primula lutea is a species of primrose that grows on basic rocks in the mountain ranges of western Alps, Jura, Vosges, Black Forest and Tatra mountains. The leaves are obovate and stalkless, with a cartilaginous edge, all growing in a basal rosette. The yellow flowers grow in clusters on 5–20 cm long stalks.

In the past it was considered synonymous with the very similar Primula auricula, but a recent study split this species off from P. auricula, with the latter being found in the more southerly areas (southern and eastern Alps, southern Carpathians, Apennines, and the Balkans).
