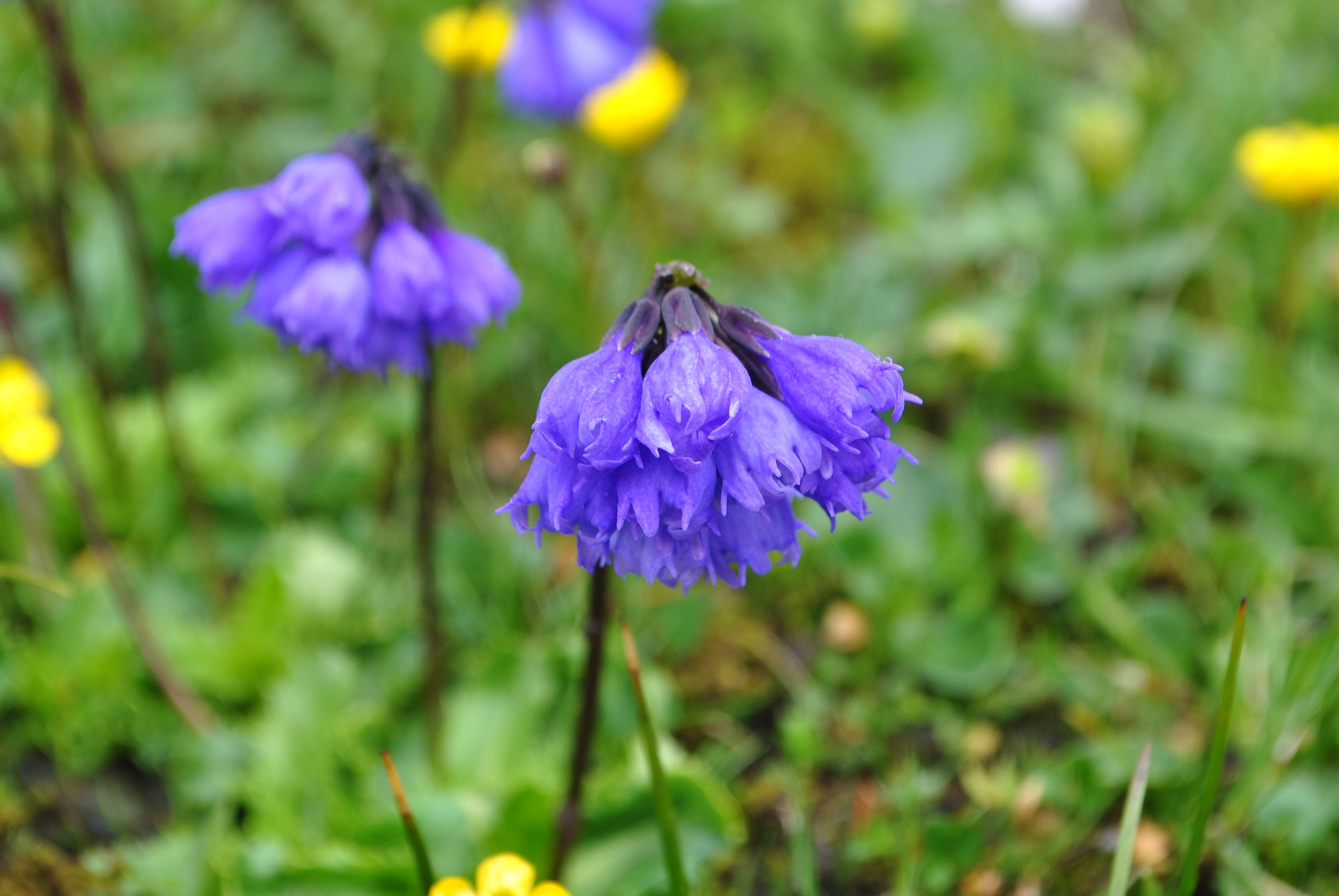

Scientific classification
- Kingdom: Plantae
- Clade: Tracheophytes
- Clade: Angiosperms
- Clade: Eudicots
- Clade: Asterids
- Order: Ericales
- Family: Primulaceae
- Genus: Primula
- Species: P. amethystina

Binomial name
- Primula amethystina (Franch)

= Primula amethystina =

Species of flowering plant

Primula amethystina is a species of flowering plant in the family Primulaceae, native to China. The plant is commonly found in west and northwest Yunnan and southwest Sichuan, and across the border in Tibet. It typically grows best in wet, boggy soil.

== Description ==
It has up to 20 bell-shaped flowers on very short stalks. Petals are 1.5 cm (1 in) across, carried in umbels of two to six, on 5–15 cm (2–6 in) tall stems. The flowers are fragrant. The leaves are smooth with denticulate or dentate margins and indistinct petioles. The plant was named for its pink flowers when dried, although the flowers are deep violet-blue on living plants.

There are three varieties:

- Primula amethystina var. amethystina: distribution is restricted to Cang Shan. It has flower lobes with notched edges.
- Primula amethystina var. argutidens: a small delicate plant with deeply toothed leaves and fewer flowers than the other subspecies. The plant is generally seen in the northern areas of distribution
- Primula amethystina var. brevifolia: taller and more robust, and more widely distributed. It carries flowers (3-20) on stems up to 25 cm (9.8 in).

== Distribution and habitat ==
Primula amethystina was first collected on Cangshan Mountain in China. It is widespread in west and northwest Yunnan, southwest Sichuan, and across the border in Tibet. It is commonly found on the Zhongdian plateau and is generally seen in wet turfy soil where the ground has become too wet for cassiopes and rhododendrons.
