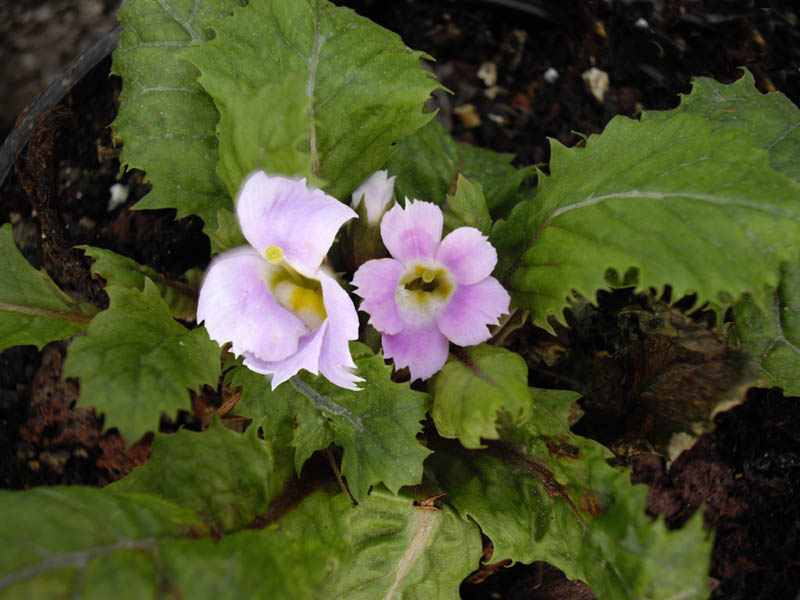

Scientific classification
- Kingdom: Plantae
- Clade: Tracheophytes
- Clade: Angiosperms
- Clade: Eudicots
- Clade: Asterids
- Order: Ericales
- Family: Primulaceae
- Genus: Primula
- Species: P. bracteosa

Binomial name
- Primula bracteosa Craib

Synonyms
- Primula boothii Craib

= Primula bracteosa =

Species of flowering plant

Primula bracteosa, the orange throated primrose, is a perennial species of primrose which is found on rocky crevices and of ravines at the altitudes of 2,300–2,700 metres (7,500–8,900 ft) in southern Xizhang, Bhutan, northeast India, Sikkim and Nepal.

== History ==
The first specimen was collected in the 19th-century in Bhutan by William Cooper and William Griffith. The species was not studied back then, and was rediscovered again by Frank Ludlow and Sherriff in 1950s in Nepal.

== Description ==
Primula bracteosa have dimorphic leaves, the outer of which are 2–6 centimetres (0.79–2.36 in) long and are spoon-shaped to obovate-spoon-shaped. It has a tapering, flat to heart-shaped base which goes into a short winged stalk which have a rounded tip and carries 3–6 centimetres (1.2–2.4 in) long inner leaves. Leaf blades are ovate to oblong-ovate and are 3–6 by 2–5 centimetres (1.18 in–2.36 in × 0.79 in–1.97 in) long. The species' margin is irregularly toothed and have rounded tip just like its winged stalk. Flowering stem is 0.5–2 centimetres (0.20–0.79 in) long, is white powdered at the top and can elongate up to 25 centimetres (9.8 in) when fruits appear. Flowers are 2.5–3 centimetres (0.98–1.18 in) wide, are pinkish lilac in color with orange-yellow throat, appear out of solitary umbel in a few or many and grow on a 1.2–1.3 centimetres (0.47–0.51 in) long tube. Bracts, while producing 0.6–2.5 centimetres (0.24–0.98 in) wide stalked leaves, are linear to lance-shaped, glandular, hairy and are 3–10 millimetres (0.12–0.39 in) long. The pedicel of a flower is 1.5–4.5 centimetres (0.59–1.77 in) long while the species' sepal is ovate to ovate-oblong, bell-shaped, 7–10 millimetres (0.28–0.39 in) long and is as white powdered as the flowering stem. Petals are broadly obovate and prominently toothed tips. They bloom from March to April.
