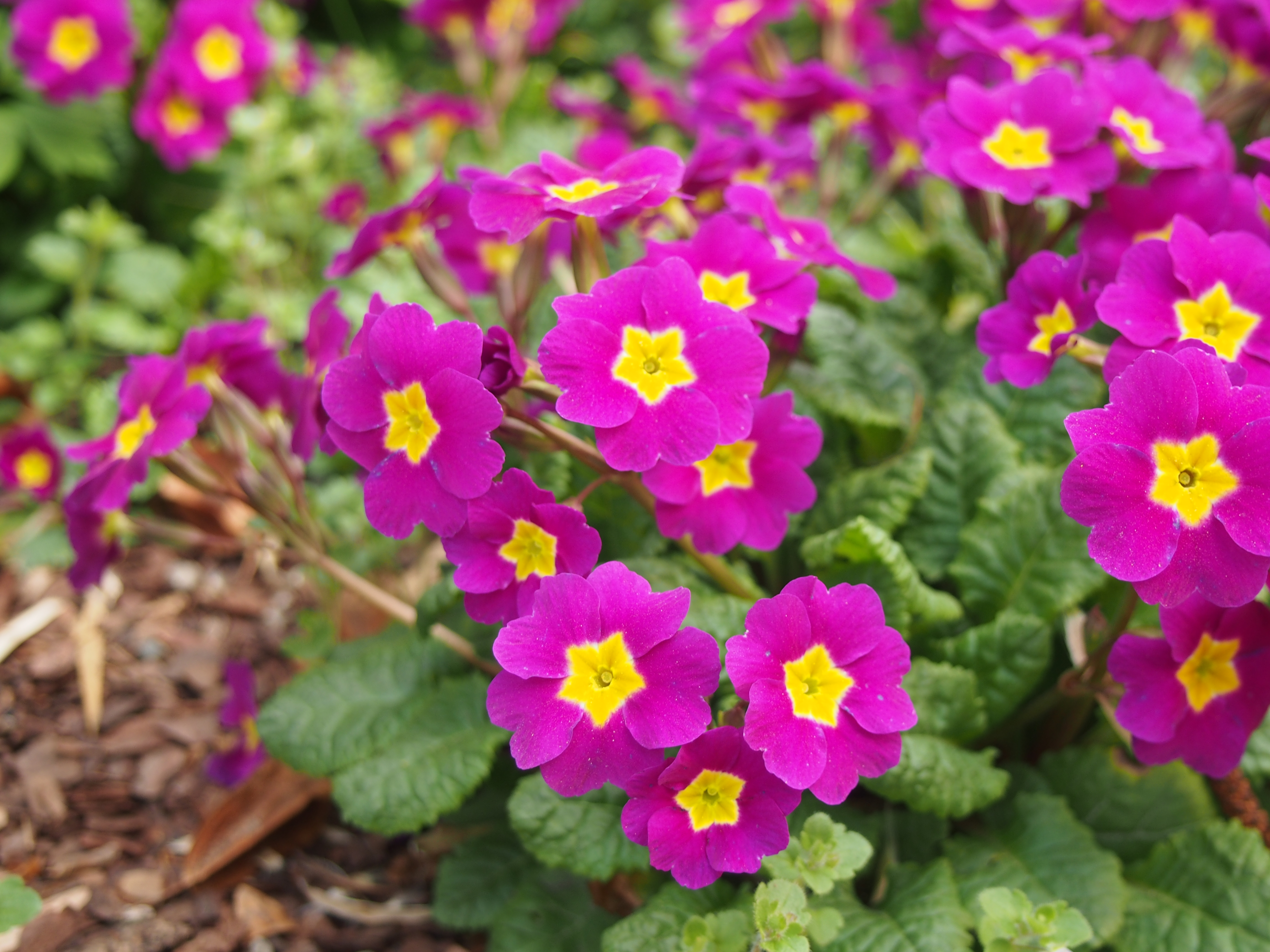
- At the University of Wrocław Botanical Garden
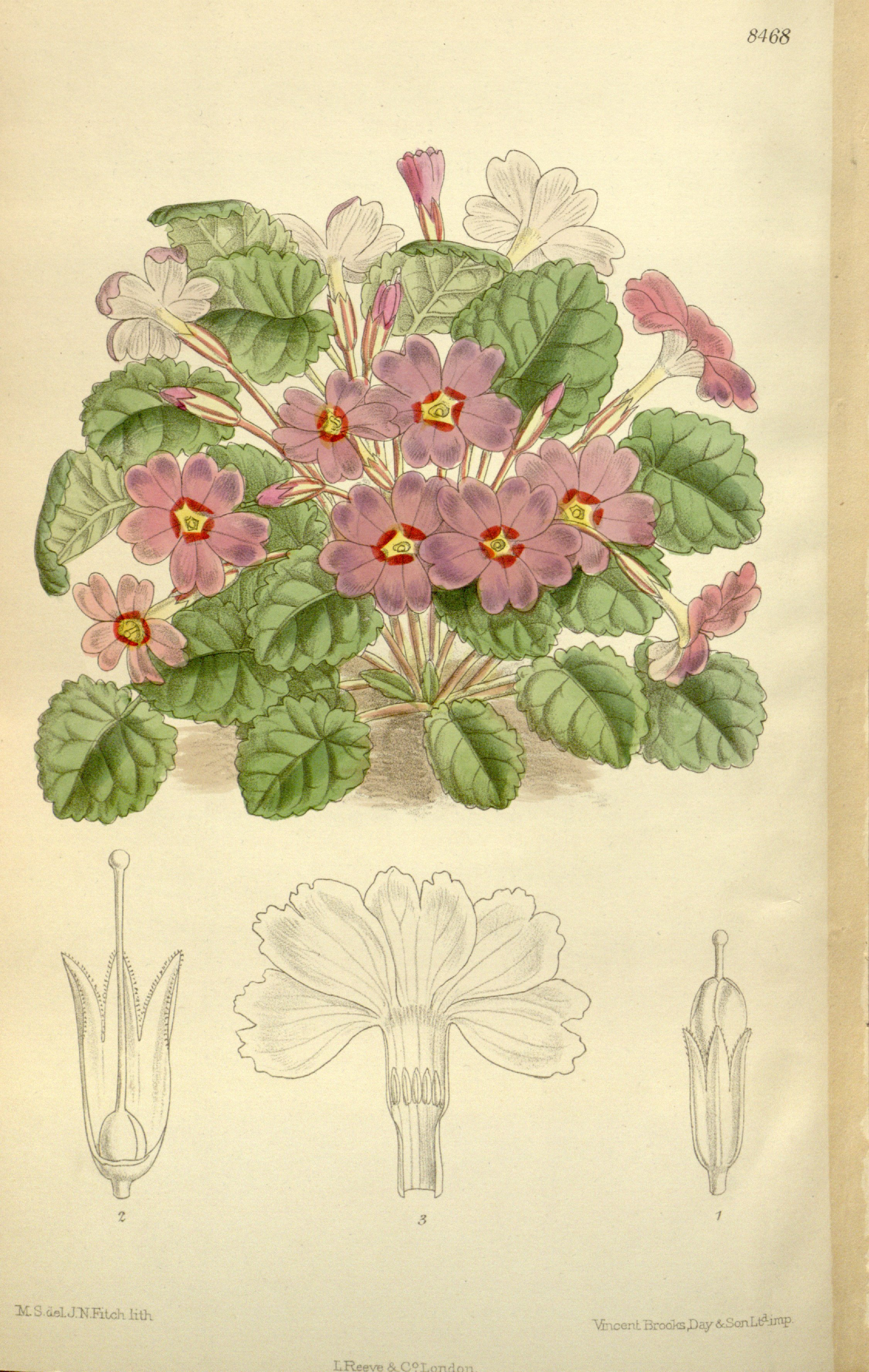
- Botanical illustration

Scientific classification
- Kingdom: Plantae
- Clade: Tracheophytes
- Clade: Angiosperms
- Clade: Eudicots
- Clade: Asterids
- Order: Ericales
- Family: Primulaceae
- Genus: Primula
- Species: P. juliae

Binomial name
- Primula juliae Kusn.

= Primula juliae =

Species of plant

Primula juliae, Julia's primrose, is a species of flowering plant in the family Primulaceae. It is native to the eastern Caucasus, and it has been introduced to the United Kingdom. A clump-forming semi-evergreen perennial reaching 10 cm (4 in), it is available from commercial nurseries.

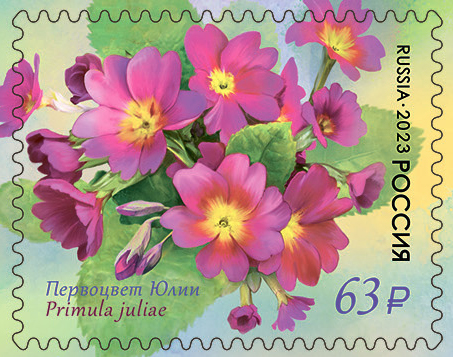
On a Russian postage stamp
