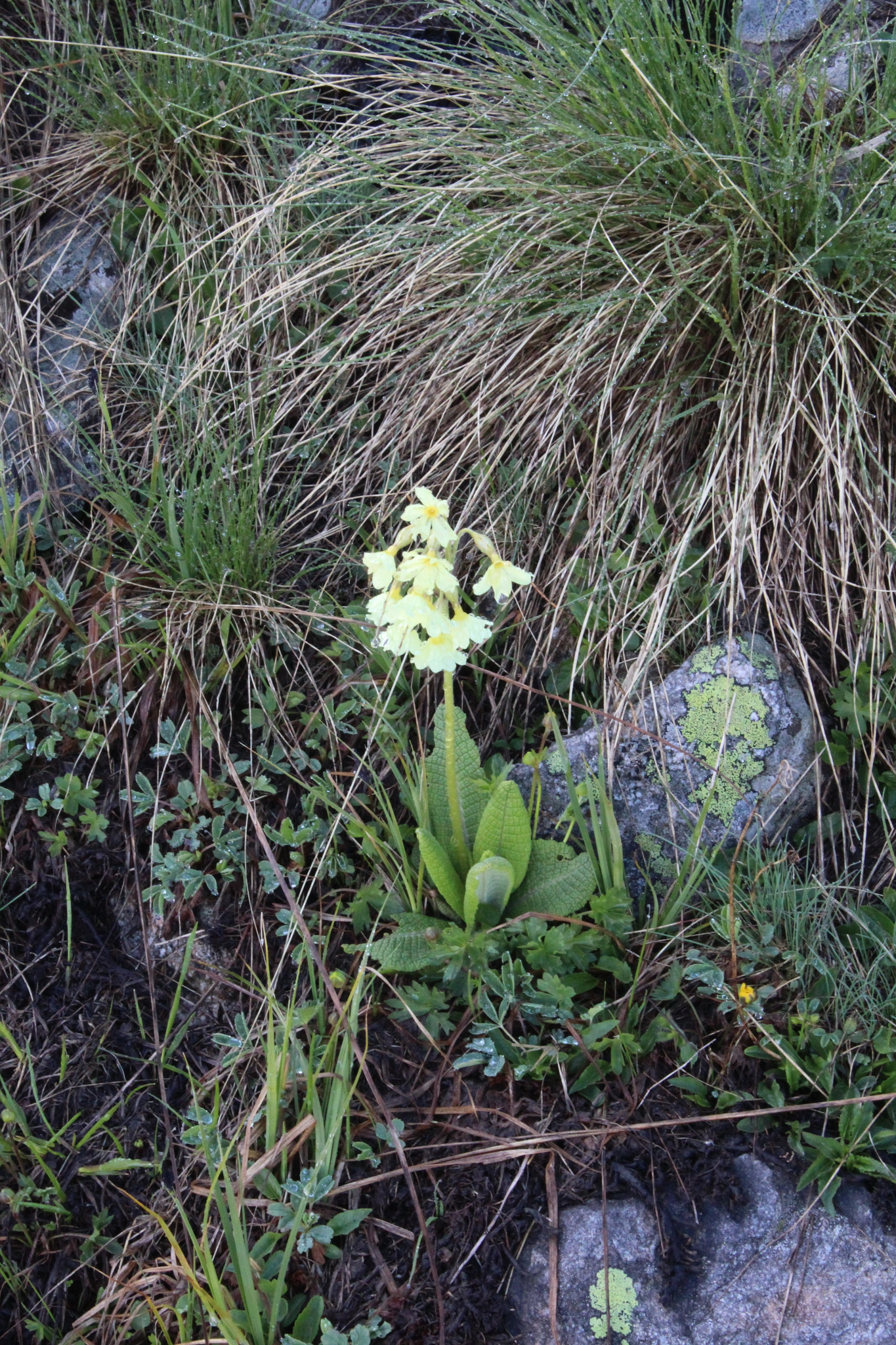
- In the Teberda Nature Reserve

Scientific classification
- Kingdom: Plantae
- Clade: Tracheophytes
- Clade: Angiosperms
- Clade: Eudicots
- Clade: Asterids
- Order: Ericales
- Family: Primulaceae
- Genus: Primula
- Species: P. ruprechtii

Binomial name
- Primula ruprechtii Kusn.

Synonyms
- Primula amoena var. flava Rupr.; Primula elatior subsp. ruprechtii (Kusn.) Hesl.-Harr.; Primula leucophylla subsp. ruprechtii (Kusn.) W.W.Sm. & Forrest

= Primula ruprechtii =

Species of plant

Primula ruprechtii is a species of flowering plant in the family Primulaceae. It is native to the Caucasus mountains. A perennial with pale yellow or cream-colored petals, it prefers to grow on the margins of thawing snowdrifts.
