= Primula zhui =

Scientific classification
- Kingdom: Plantae
- Clade: Tracheophytes
- Clade: Angiosperms
- Clade: Eudicots
- Clade: Asterids
- Order: Ericales
- Family: Primulaceae
- Genus: Primula
- Species: P. zhui

Binomial name
- Primula zhui Y.H.Tan & B.Yang

Species of flowering plant

Primula zhui is a species of flowering plant within the family Primulaceae. The species was named in honour of Professor Zhu Hua of the Xishuangbanna Tropical Botanical Garden. As of 2017 there were fewer than 50 individuals of the species recorded to exist, which lead to the IUCN to consider classifying it as a critically endangered species.

== Description ==
Primula zhui is a perennial plant, which ranges in height from 12 to 20 cm tall. This species has a basal rosette of leaves that are ovate to ovate-elliptic. The petiole of the leaf ranges from 3–10 cm long. Flowers stand on stems, which possess sparse short glandular hairs. Each plant can host 8-15 distylous flowers per stem.

== Distribution and habitat ==
Primula zhui is native to South-Central China. It is endemic to the province of Yunnan where the species has three different localities. The three populations are located in Yixiang, Simao, Pu’er.

P. zhui grows on the subtropical forest floors of evergreen broadleaf forests.
