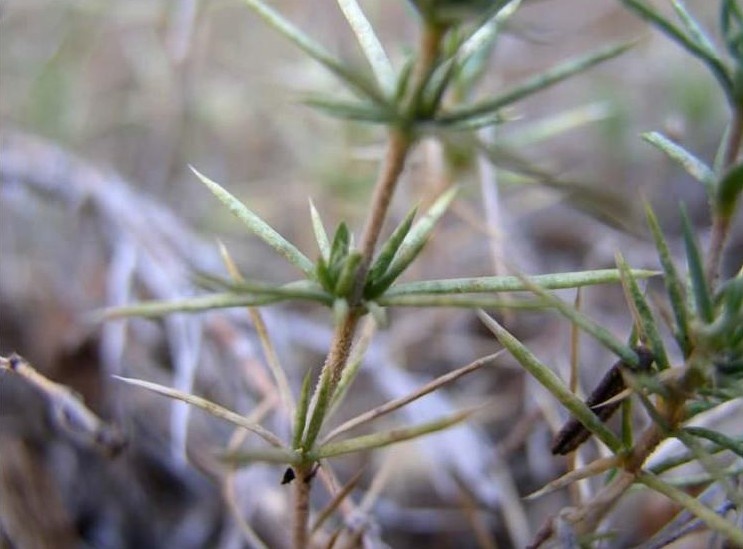
- leaves

Conservation status
- Apparently Secure (NatureServe)

Scientific classification
- Kingdom: Plantae
- Clade: Embryophytes
- Clade: Tracheophytes
- Clade: Spermatophytes
- Clade: Angiosperms
- Clade: Eudicots
- Clade: Asterids
- Order: Ericales
- Family: Polemoniaceae
- Genus: Linanthus
- Species: L. watsonii

Binomial name
- Linanthus watsonii (A.Gray) Wherry

Subspecies
- L. w. subsp. dolomiticus; L. w. subsp. laccolithicus; L. w. subsp. watsonii

Synonyms
- Gilia watsonii; Leptodactylon watsonii; Navarretia watsonii

= Linanthus watsonii =

Plant species in the phlox family

Linanthus watsonii (syn. Leptodactylon watsonii) is a species of flowering plant in the phlox family known by the common name Watson's prickly phlox. It is native to the western United States, mainly in the Intermountain region.

This perennial subshrub forms a mat up to 10 centimeters high. The leaves are usually oppositely arranged. Each is divided into a number of needlelike parts and they measure up to 2 centimeters in length. The flowers are white or yellowish with six lobes on a corolla up to 2.8 centimeters long.

This plant grows in mountains, foothills, and canyons. It grows in rock cracks and cliffsides in a number of habitat types. The soils are calcareous.

The plant is vulnerable to threats because it has a small and limited population size, but it grows in mostly inaccessible locations on the walls of cliffs and canyons, so it is often protected from most threats.

== Taxonomy ==
In 1870 Asa Gray scientifically described a new species in the Gilia genus which he named Gilia watsonii. It was moved Navarretia by 1891 by Otto Kuntze, but the accepted classification was published in 1961 by Edgar T. Wherry, placing it in Linanthus. Along with its genus it is part of the Polemoniaceae family and the species has three accepted subspecies.

- Linanthus watsonii subsp. dolomiticus – Native to Nevada and Arizona
- Linanthus watsonii subsp. laccolithicus – Native to Arizona
- Linanthus watsonii subsp. watsonii – Native to Colorado, Wyoming, Idaho, Utah, and Nevada

Linanthus watsonii has six synonyms of the species or two of it three subspecies.

Table of Synonyms
Name	Year	Rank	Synonym of:	Notes
Gilia floribunda var. arida M.E.Jones	1895	variety	subsp. watsonii	= het.
Gilia watsonii A.Gray	1870	species	L. watsonii	≡ hom.
Leptodactylon watsonii Rydb.	1906	species	subsp. watsonii	= het.
Leptodactylon watsonii f. aridum (M.E.Jones) Wherry	1945	form	subsp. watsonii	= het.
Linanthus watsonii var. dolomiticus (J.M.Porter & R.Patt.) Tiehm	2023	variety	subsp. dolomiticus	≡ hom.
Navarretia watsonii (A.Gray) Kuntze	1891	species	L. watsonii	≡ hom.
Notes: ≡ homotypic synonym; = heterotypic synonym

== Range ==
According to Plants of the World Online Linanthus watsonii is native to six states in the western United States, Nevada, Arizona, Utah, Idaho, Wyoming and Colorado. In Nevada it grows in Nye and Lander counties, but the Natural Resources Conservation Service does not record the species in Arizona. The species is widespread in Utah and mainly found in southern Idaho, with a highly disjunct population to the north in Bonner County. It grows in three western Wyoming counties, Hot Springs, Fremont, and Sweetwater, and also in three western Colorado counties, Moffat, Mesa, and Montrose.
