= Primula capillaris =

Conservation status
- Critically Imperiled (NatureServe)

Scientific classification
- Kingdom: Plantae
- Clade: Tracheophytes
- Clade: Angiosperms
- Clade: Eudicots
- Clade: Asterids
- Order: Ericales
- Family: Primulaceae
- Genus: Primula
- Species: P. capillaris

Binomial name
- Primula capillaris N.H. Holmgren & A.H. Holmgren

Species of flowering plant

Primula capillaris is a rare species of flowering plant in the primrose family known by the common name Ruby Mountains primrose, or Ruby Mountain primrose. It is endemic to Nevada in the United States, where it is limited to the Ruby Mountains of Elko County.

This small plant is a few centimeters tall, growing from a short rhizome. The thick, hairless leaves are linear or somewhat lance-shaped, 1 to 6 centimeters long and no more than half a centimeter wide with rounded tips. The delicate, showy flower has a bell-shaped calyx of green sepals. The corolla is reddish or bluish purple with a yellow center. Blooming occurs in July and August.

This plant occurs in subalpine climates at elevations between 2710 and 3160 meters, in meadows and coniferous forest and woodland habitat. It grows on soils derived from glacial till, sometimes in mats of Selaginella, such as Watson's spikemoss (Selaginella watsonii). Other plants in the habitat include fewseed draba (Draba oligosperma), alpine avens (Geum rossii), shrubby cinquefoil (Potentilla fruticosa), orpine stonecrop, mountain sorrel (Oxyria digyna), smooth prairie star (Lithophragma glabra), Pacific woodrush (Luzula comosa), bluebells (Mertensia ciliata), and whitebark pine (Pinus albicaulis).

Threats to this attractive plant include poaching.
