= Primula pinnata =

Scientific classification
- Kingdom: Plantae
- Clade: Tracheophytes
- Clade: Angiosperms
- Clade: Eudicots
- Clade: Asterids
- Order: Ericales
- Family: Primulaceae
- Genus: Primula
- Species: P. pinnata

Binomial name
- Primula pinnata Popov & Fed.

Synonyms
- Aleuritia pinnata (Popov & Fed.) Soják; Primula farinosa var. pinnata (Popov & Fed.) M.M.Ivanova

Species of flowering plant

Primula pinnata is a species of flowering plant in the family Primulaceae, native to Irkutsk Oblast in Russia. It is a narrow endemic restricted to the Lake Baikal area.
