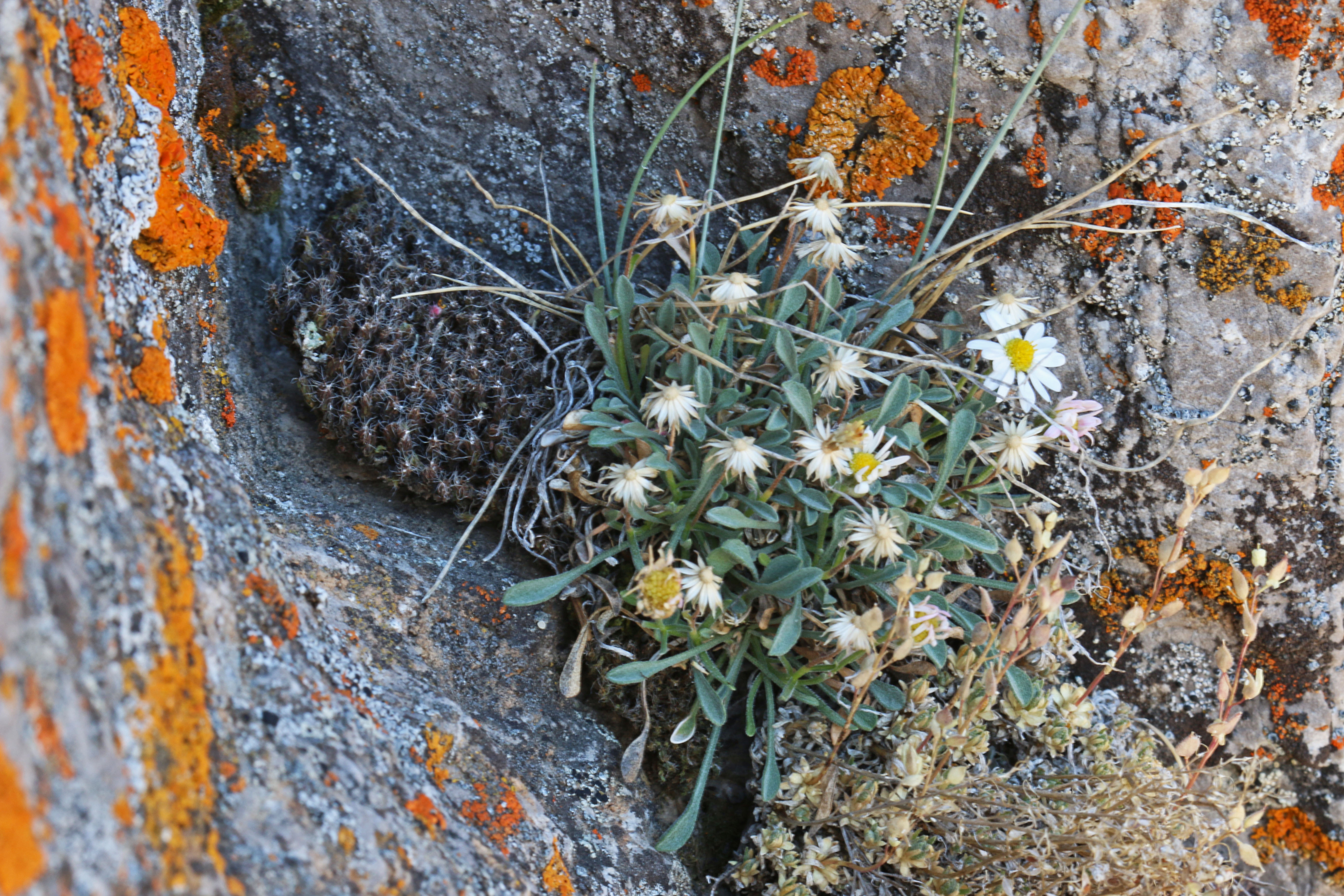
- In Utah

Scientific classification
- Kingdom: Plantae
- Clade: Tracheophytes
- Clade: Angiosperms
- Clade: Eudicots
- Clade: Asterids
- Order: Asterales
- Family: Asteraceae
- Genus: Erigeron
- Species: E. cronquistii

Binomial name
- Erigeron cronquistii Maguire

= Erigeron cronquistii =

Species of flowering plant

Erigeron cronquistii is a rare North American species of flowering plants in the family Asteraceae known by the common name Cronquist's fleabane. It has been found only in the Bear River Range in Cache County in the northern part of the state of Utah in the United States.

Erigeron cronquistii grows on ledges, cracks in cliff faces, and erosion pockets at high elevations in the mountains. It is a very small perennial herb rarely more than 7 cm (2.8 inches) tall, forming a taproot and sending up many shoots so that it forms a dense clump of stems. Each stem generally produces 1 or 2 flower heads, each head with 10-25 white or pale pink ray florets plus numerous yellow disc florets.
