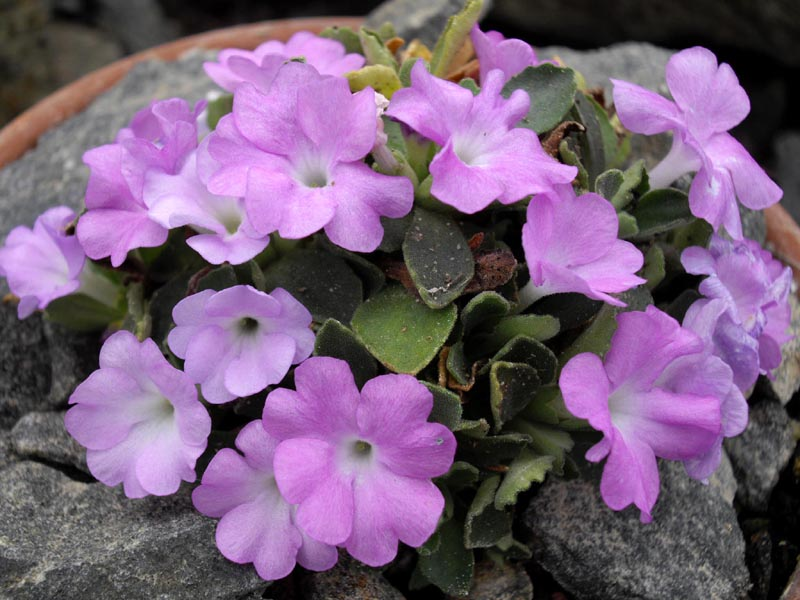

Scientific classification
- Kingdom: Plantae
- Clade: Tracheophytes
- Clade: Angiosperms
- Clade: Eudicots
- Clade: Asterids
- Order: Ericales
- Family: Primulaceae
- Genus: Primula
- Species: P. allionii

Binomial name
- Primula allionii Hausm.

= Primula allionii =

Species of flowering plant

Primula allionii is a species of flowering plant in the family Primulaceae, native to southern France and northern Italy where it is found on cliffs at an altitude of 700–1,900 metres (2,300–6,200 ft). It is a small, spreading, evergreen perennial growing to 10 centimetres (3.9 in) tall by 20 centimetres (7.9 in) wide, with leathery, hairy leaves and pink flowers in late winter and early spring.

The specific epithet allionii honours the Italian botanist Carlo Allioni.

It requires well-drained alkaline soil and dry conditions, and is usually cultivated in an alpine house.
