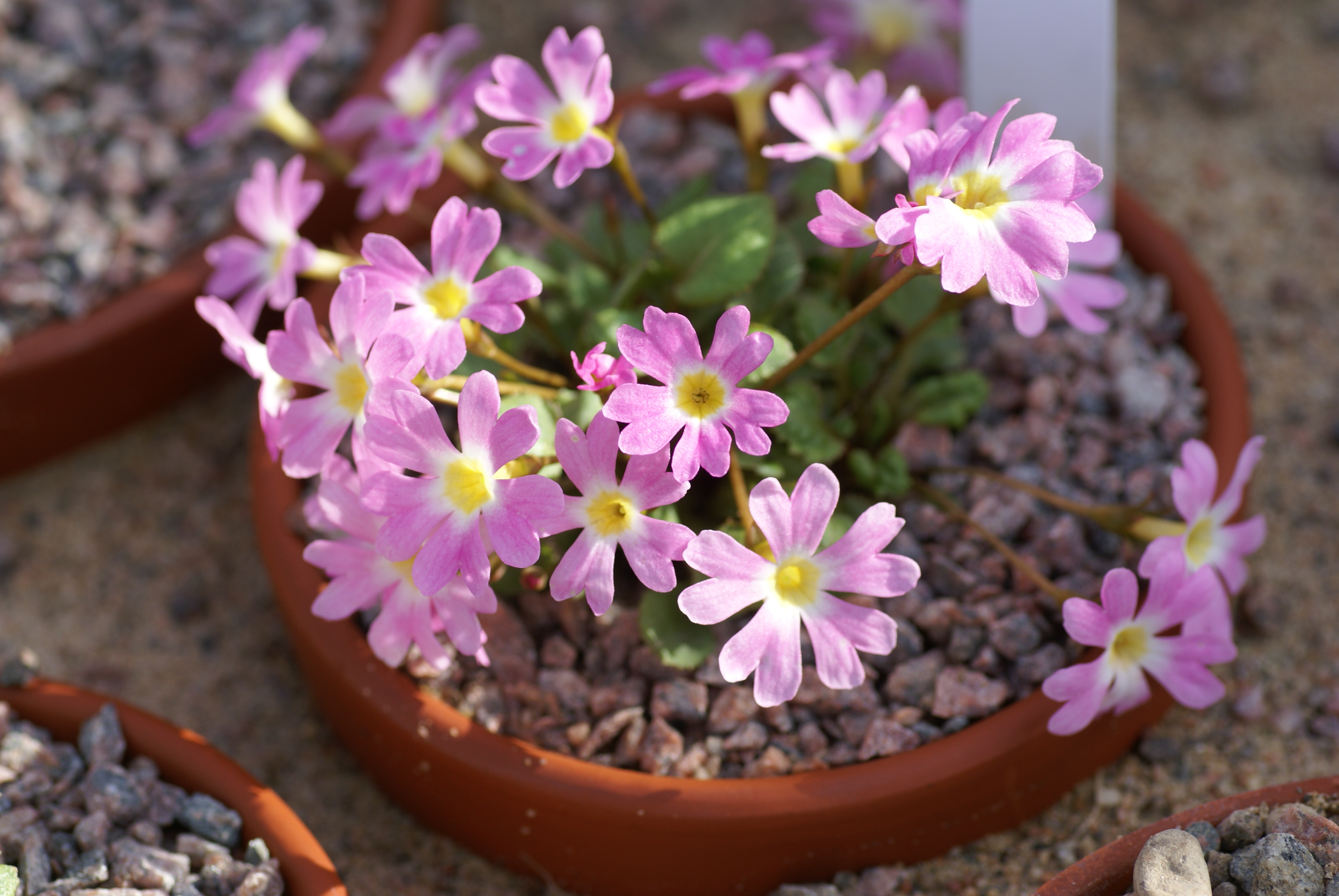

Scientific classification
- Kingdom: Plantae
- Clade: Tracheophytes
- Clade: Angiosperms
- Clade: Eudicots
- Clade: Asterids
- Order: Ericales
- Family: Primulaceae
- Genus: Primula
- Species: P. clarkei

Binomial name
- Primula clarkei G.Watt

Synonyms
- Auganthus clarkei (Watt) Soják

= Primula clarkei =

Species of flowering plant

Primula clarkei is a species of flowering plant within the genus Primula and family Primulaceae. The species is endemic to the Western Himalayas, where it can be found in Poshiana of the Pir Panjal mountain range.

== Description ==
Primula clarkei is a glabrous perennial plant, which grows from a slender rootstock. The species possesses a creeping growth habit. The leaves of Primula clarkei have a distinct petiole. The lamina, measuring between 12 and 40 mm in length and 22 to 40 mm in width, displays a subreniform to subcordate or orbicular-oblong shape. The leaves are membranous in texture and may have a crenate-dentate or finely crenate margin. The leaf blades taper to an attenuate point, and the faintly visible nerves traverse the lamina. The slender petiole, which can grow up to 9.5 cm long, is typically more or less sheathing.

Primula clarkei produces rose-pink flowers, typically numbering between two and four per plant. The flowers are heteromorphic. The pedicels, which bear the flowers, are 2.5 to 6.5 cm long and do not exceed the foliage. The calyx of the flower measures approximately 6 to 7 mm in length, displaying a broad campanulate shape. It is glabrous and around half-cleft, with triangular-ovate lobes that reach about 3 mm in length. The corolla tube is 8 to 8.5 mm long, while the limb has a breadth of 1.1 to 1.6 cm. The lobes of the corolla are obtuse and obcordate, measuring about 7 to 7.5 mm in length and 6 to 6.5 mm in width. The style of Primula clarkei is slender. The fruiting capsule, which is subglobose in shape, is included within the calyx. The seeds are small, measuring less than 1 mm, and possess a minutely reticulate-vesiculose texture.

== Distribution and habitat ==
Primula clarkei is an endemic species located in Poshiana area of the Pir Panjal mountain range in Kashmir. Poshiana is part of the Western Himalayas and the only location the species can be found. P. clarkei primarily grows in the temperate biome, which is characterized by moderate climatic conditions. P. clarkei grows on wet rock-faces situated at elevations of around 2,100 meters above sea level.
