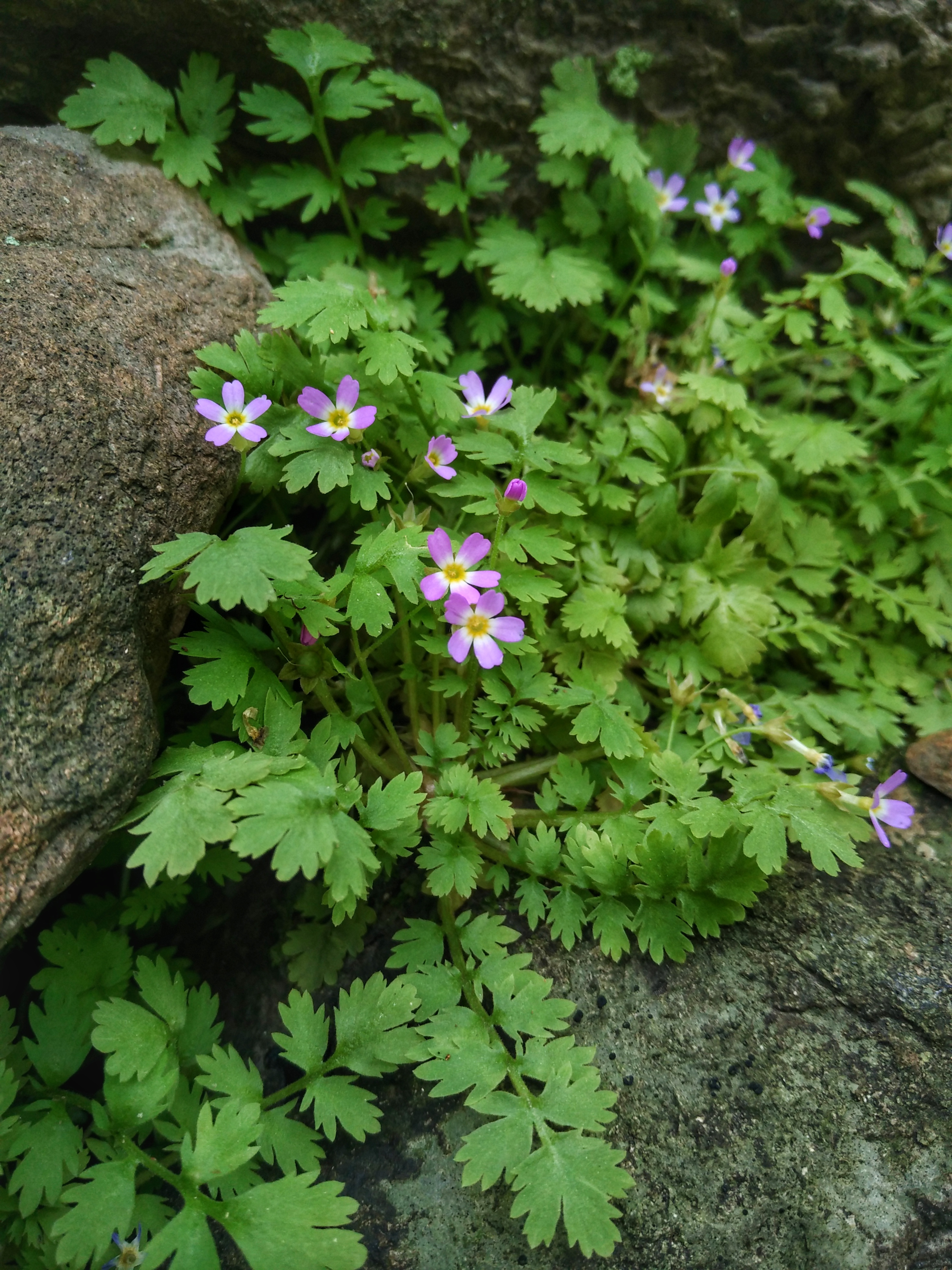

Scientific classification
- Kingdom: Plantae
- Clade: Tracheophytes
- Clade: Angiosperms
- Clade: Eudicots
- Clade: Asterids
- Order: Ericales
- Family: Primulaceae
- Genus: Primula
- Species: P. cicutariifolia

Binomial name
- Primula cicutariifolia Pax

Synonyms
- List: Primula erodioides Schltr.; Primula ranunculoides var. minor F.H.Chen

= Primula cicutariifolia =

Species of flowering plant

Primula cicutariifolia, is a species of flowering plant within the genus Primula and family Primulaceae.

== Description ==
=== Leaves ===
Primula cicutariifolia is a perennial plant species. The leaves of this P. cicutariifolia exhibit a dimorphic nature. The outer leaves wither during the flowering phase, displaying a long petiolate structure. They are ovate in shape, measuring approximately 3 to 8 mm in width and length. The margin of these outer leaves can vary from being entirely smooth to dentate, having small indentations. In contrast, the inner leaves showcase a different structure. They possess a petiole measuring 0.6 to 2 cm, with an elliptic to oblong leaf blade that spans from 1.5 to 10 cm in length. The inner leaves are pinnatisect, meaning they have lobes or pinnae. They typically consist of 1 or 2 to 6 pairs of pinnae. The proximal pair, located at the bottom, is usually very small and gradually increases in size towards the upper pairs. These pinnae measure around 3 to 13 mm in length and 2.5 to 12 mm in width, with 2 to 4 teeth on each side. The terminal pair, situated at the top, is larger and elliptic to broadly ovate, often having three lobes.

=== Flowers ===
Primula cicutariifolia produces scapes that range from 1 to 5 cm in length. These scapes bear solitary umbels, which consist of 1 or 2 to 4 flowers. The bracts associated with the umbels are linear and measure approximately 1.5 to 3 mm. The pedicel, which connects the flower to the scape, is 0.7 to 3 cm long and sparingly glandular. The flowers of P. cicutariifolia can either be homostylous or heterostylous. In the case of homostylous flowers, both the stamens and style are located near the apex of the corolla tube. However, the specific details regarding the number of pin flowers remain unknown. Thrums, on the other hand, possess stamens near the apex of the corolla tube, while the style is about half the length of the tube. The calyx of the flowers is campanulate, measuring 3 to 4.5 mm and is glandular, with lanceolate lobes splitting below the middle. The corolla of the flowers ranges in colour from pink to pale lilac. Its tube measures 4.5 to 6.5 mm, while the limb, referring to the wider part of the corolla, spans 4 to 8 mm. The lobes of the corolla are cuneate-oblong, with a subtruncate or slightly emarginate apex. Following fertilization, the plant develops subglobose capsules, which are approximately 2.5 mm in diameter. The flowering period occurs from March to April, while the fruiting phase takes place from April to May.

== Distribution and habitat ==
Primula cicutariifolia is endemic to China, where it can be found in the Southeast portion of the country. The species has been discovered within the Chinese provinces of South Anhui, East Hubei, Hunan, North Jiangxi and North Zhejiang. P. cicutariifolia can be found in damp habitats within woodlands and near to streams where it inhabits wet moss covered rocks. The species has been recorded at elevations ranging from 500 - 1000 meters above sea level.
