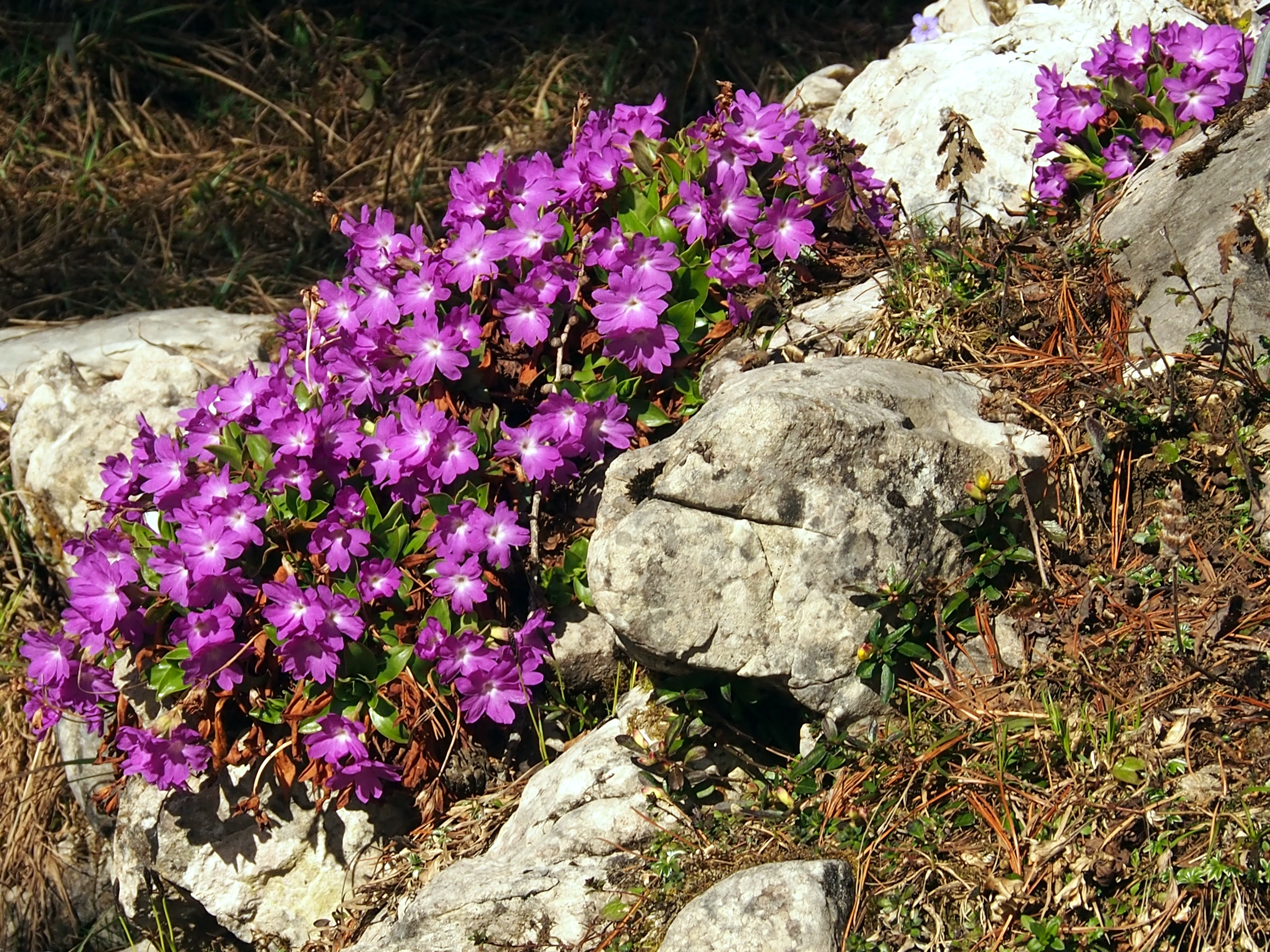
- Amid limestone rocks
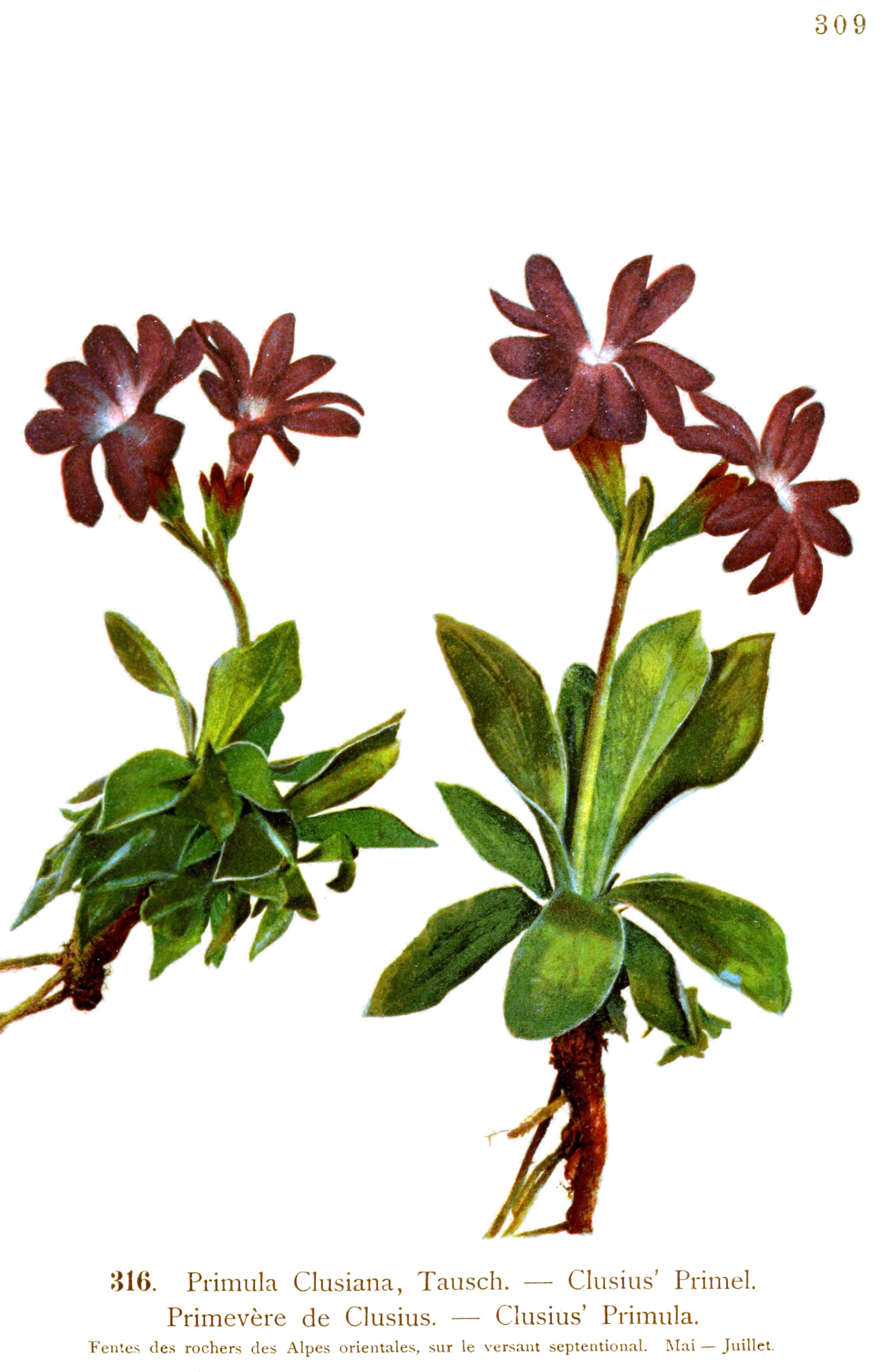
- Botanical illustration

Scientific classification
- Kingdom: Plantae
- Clade: Tracheophytes
- Clade: Angiosperms
- Clade: Eudicots
- Clade: Asterids
- Order: Ericales
- Family: Primulaceae
- Genus: Primula
- Species: P. clusiana

Binomial name
- Primula clusiana Tausch

Synonyms
- List: Auricula-ursi clusiana (Tausch) Soják; Primula churchilii Gusmus ex Kolb; Primula clusiana var. acaulis Roth; Primula clusiana var. crenigera Beck; Primula clusii Wiest ex Gaud.; Primula spectabilis Mart. & W.D.J.Koch; Primula spectabilis var. ciliata W.D.J.Koch

= Primula clusiana =

Species of plant

Primula clusiana is a species of flowering plant in the primrose family Primulaceae, native to the northeastern Alps; Germany and Austria. A perennial, it is occasionally available from commercial suppliers.

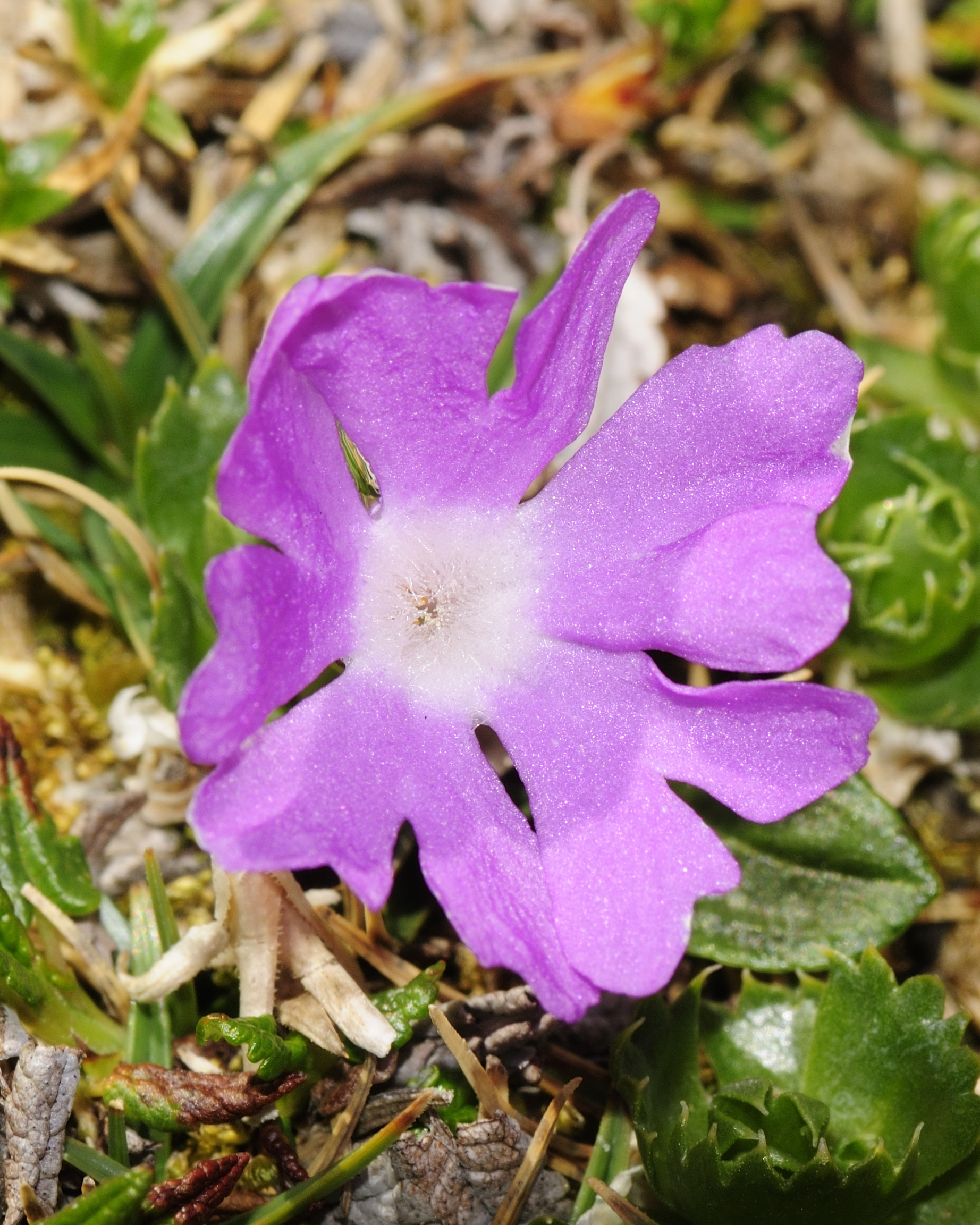
Close-up of flower

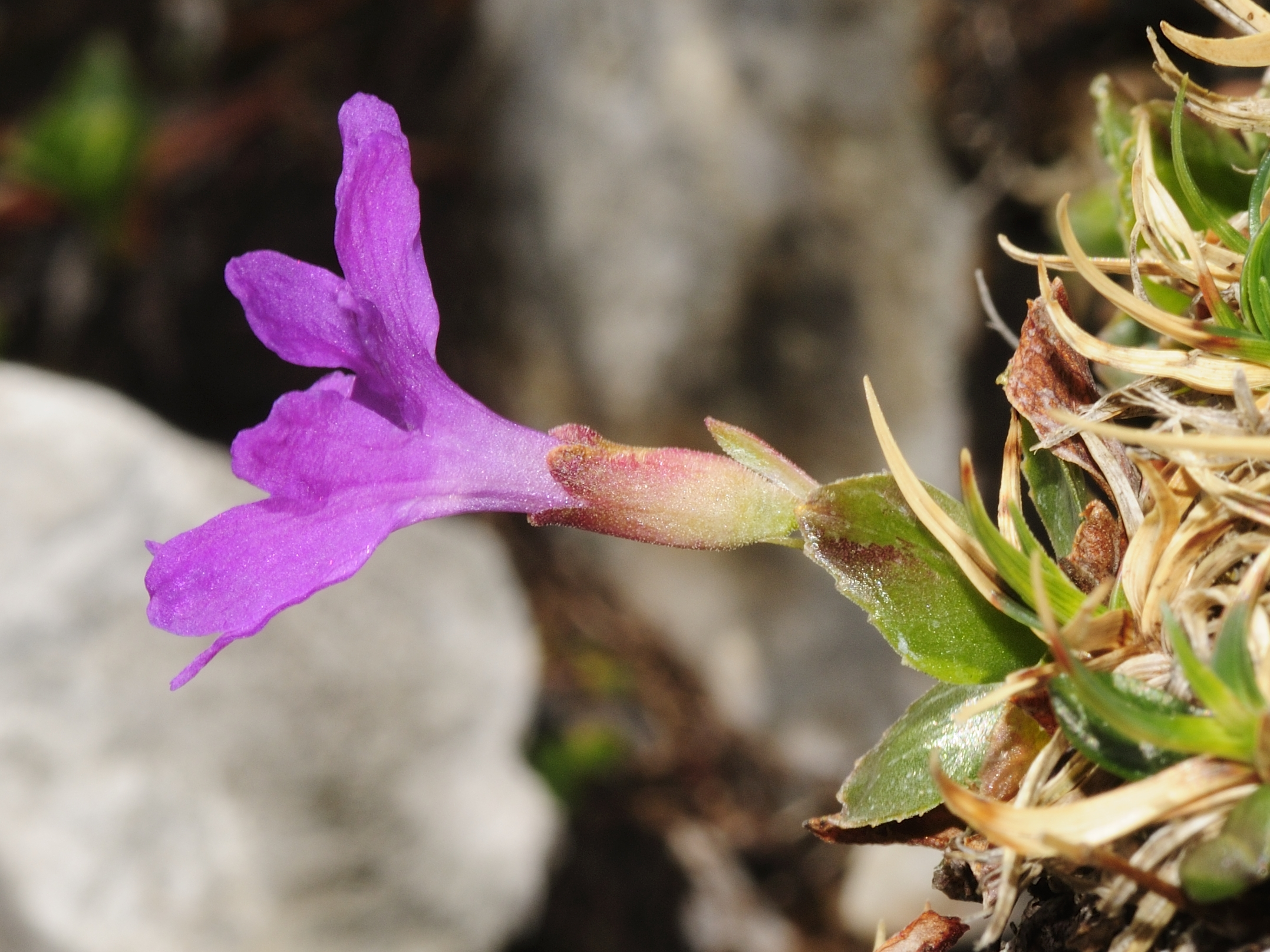
Side view of flower

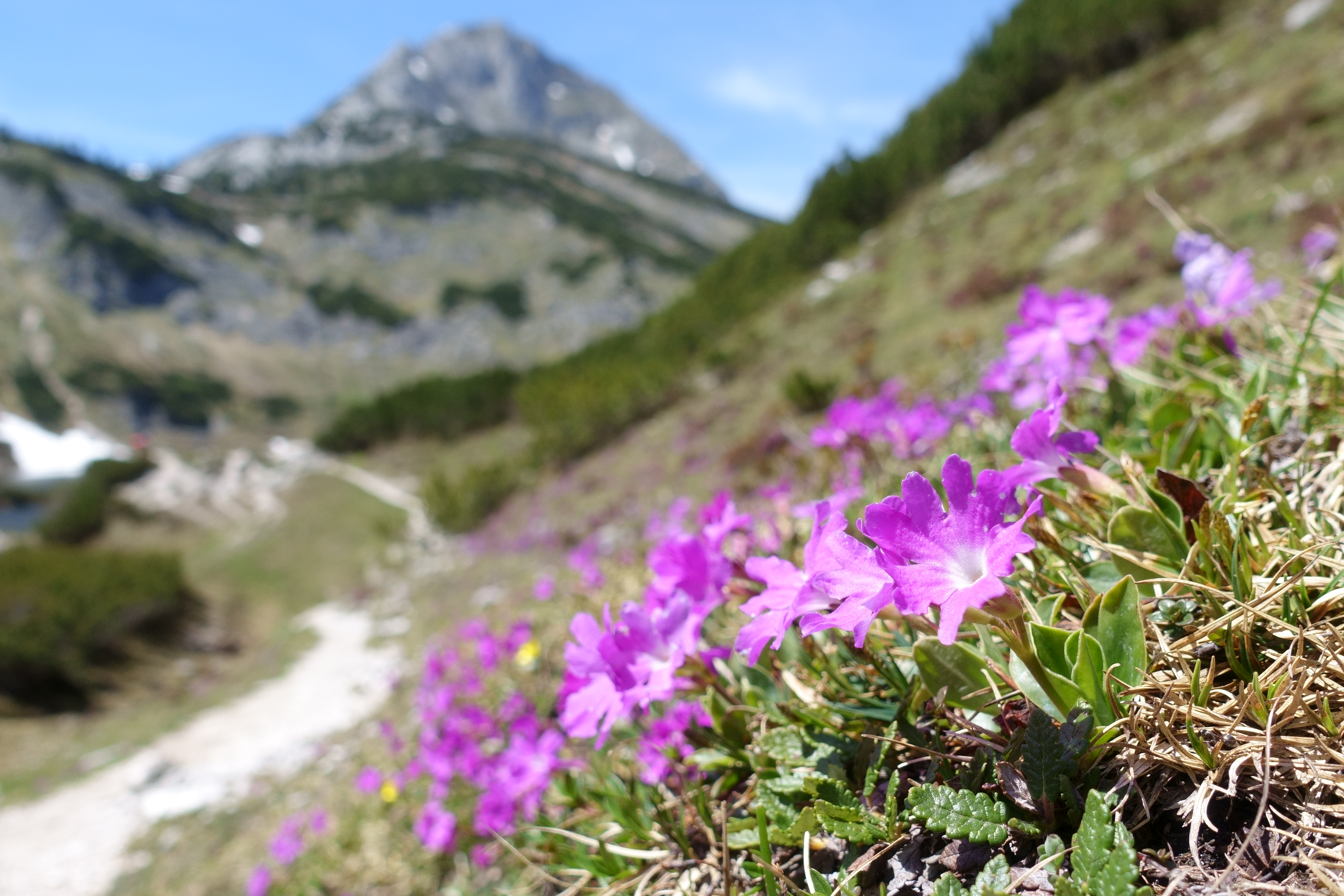
In the Totes Gebirge

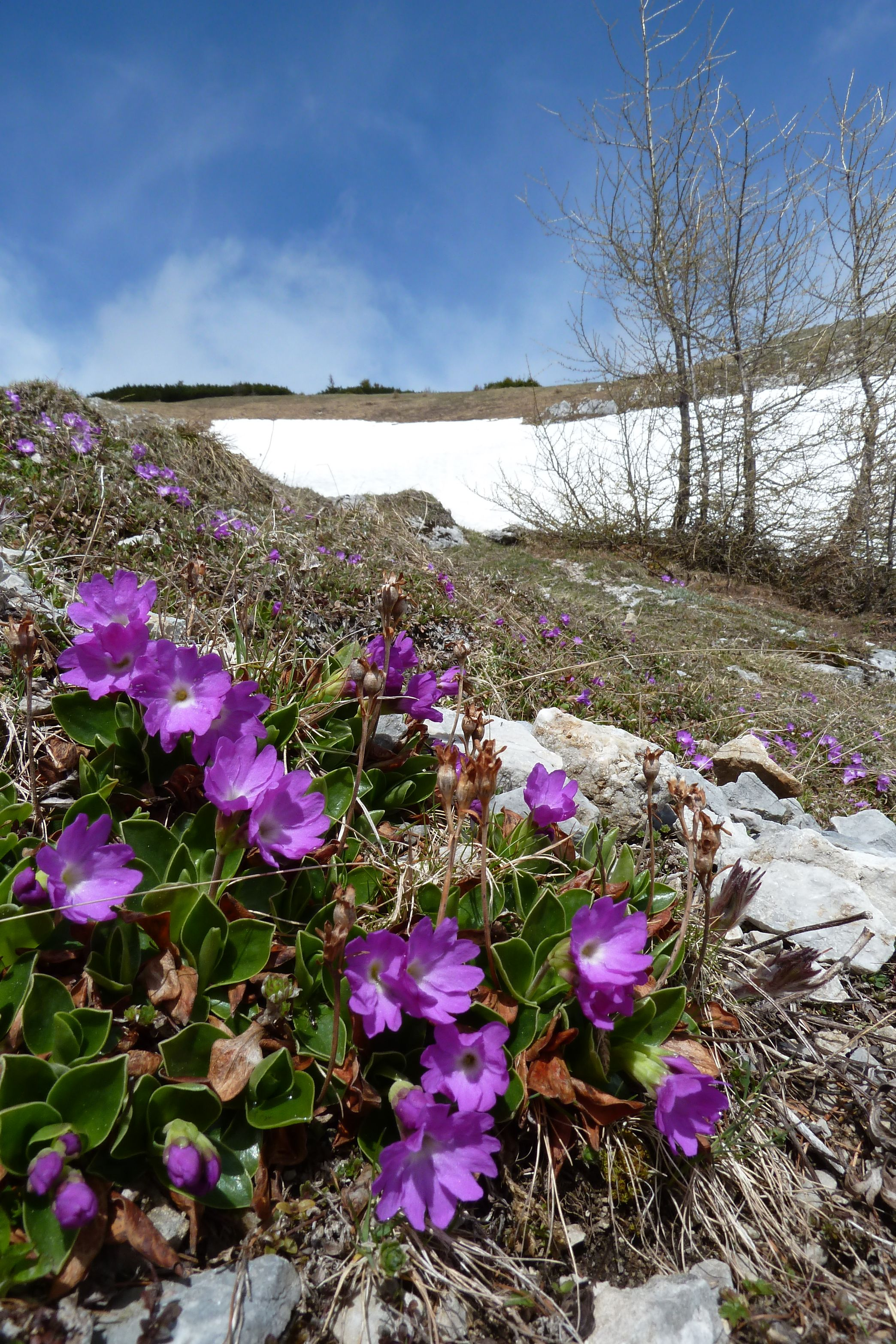
In bloom in May, snow still present nearby

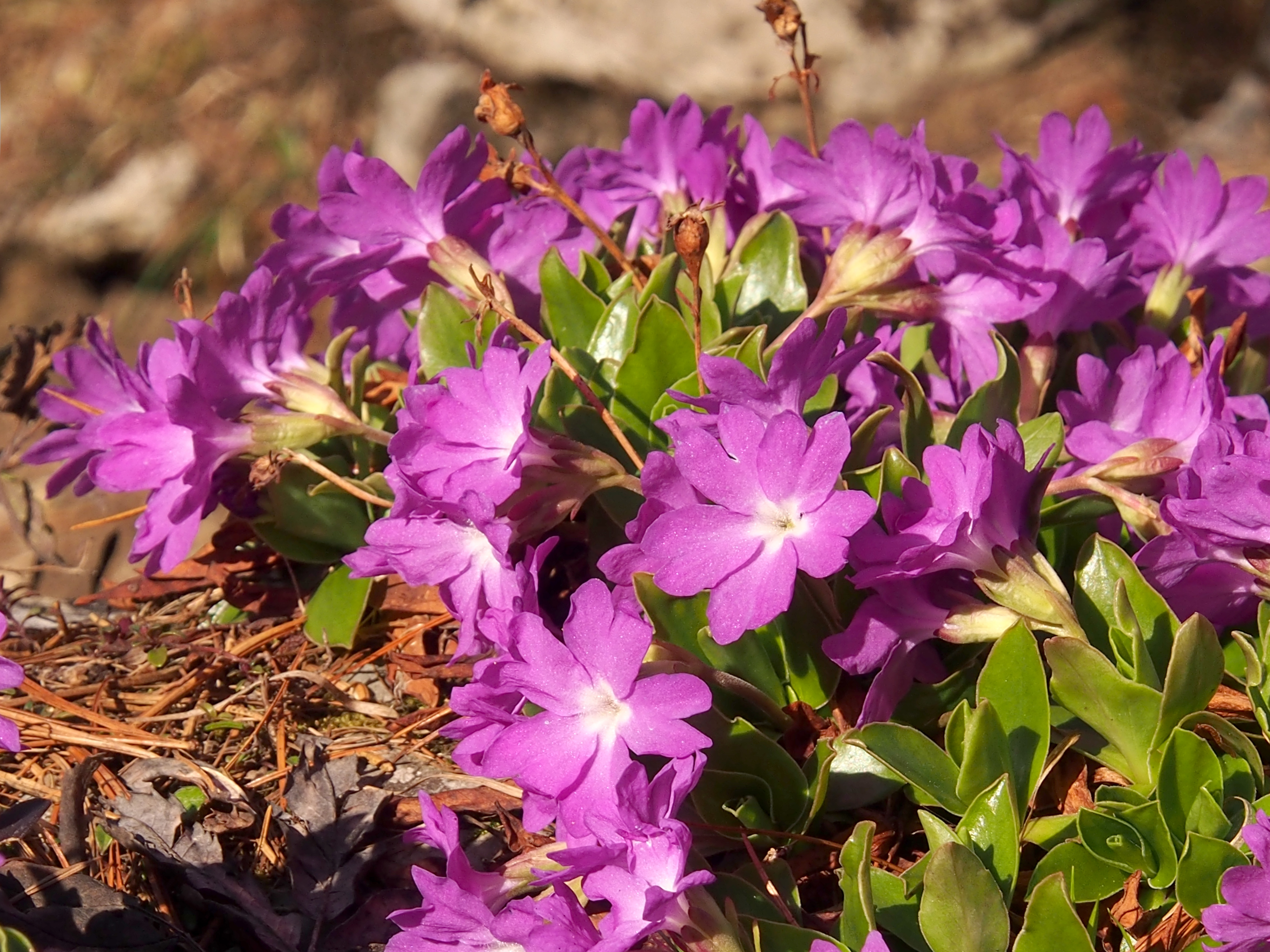
Flowers

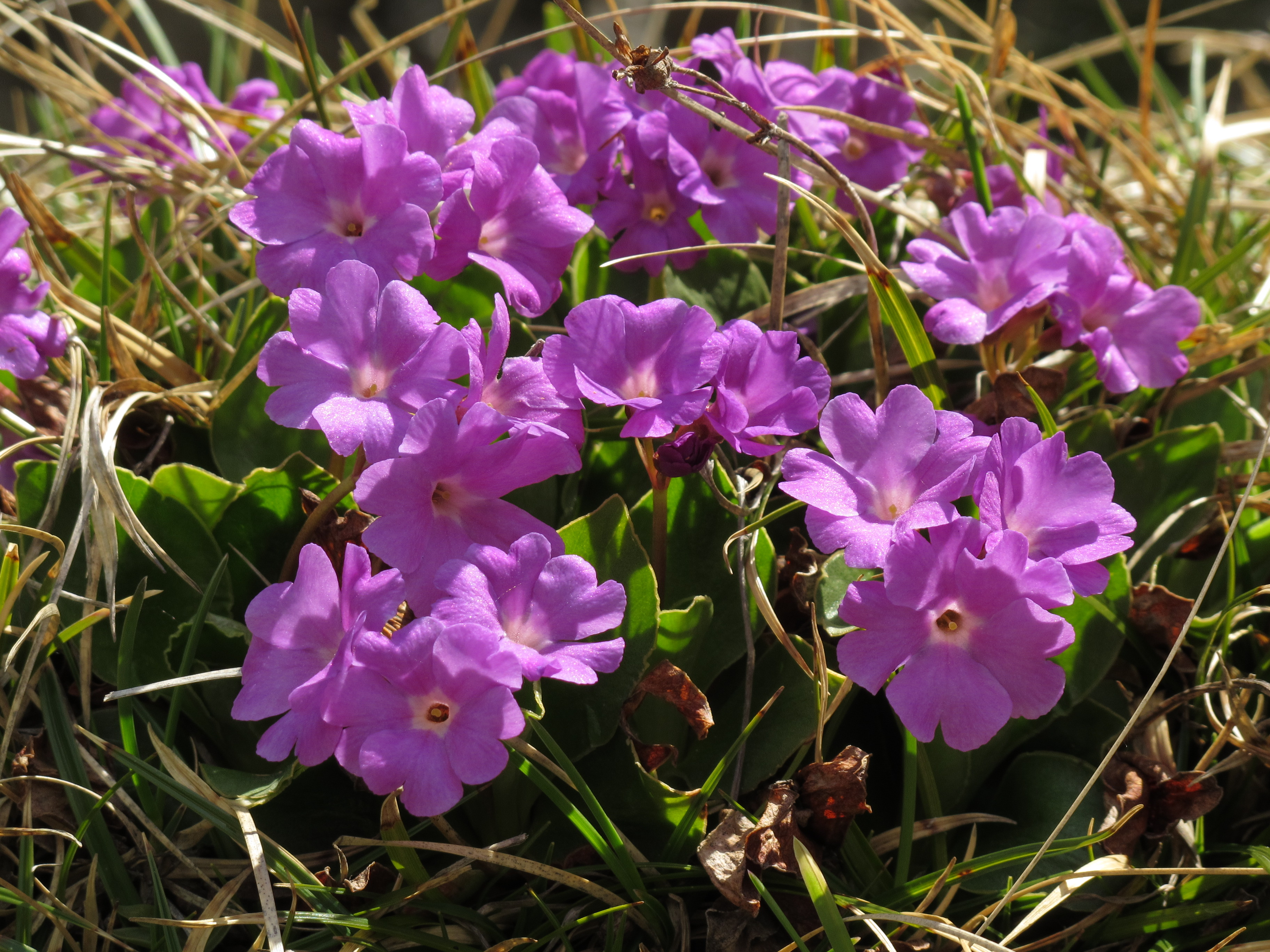
Primula spectabilis
