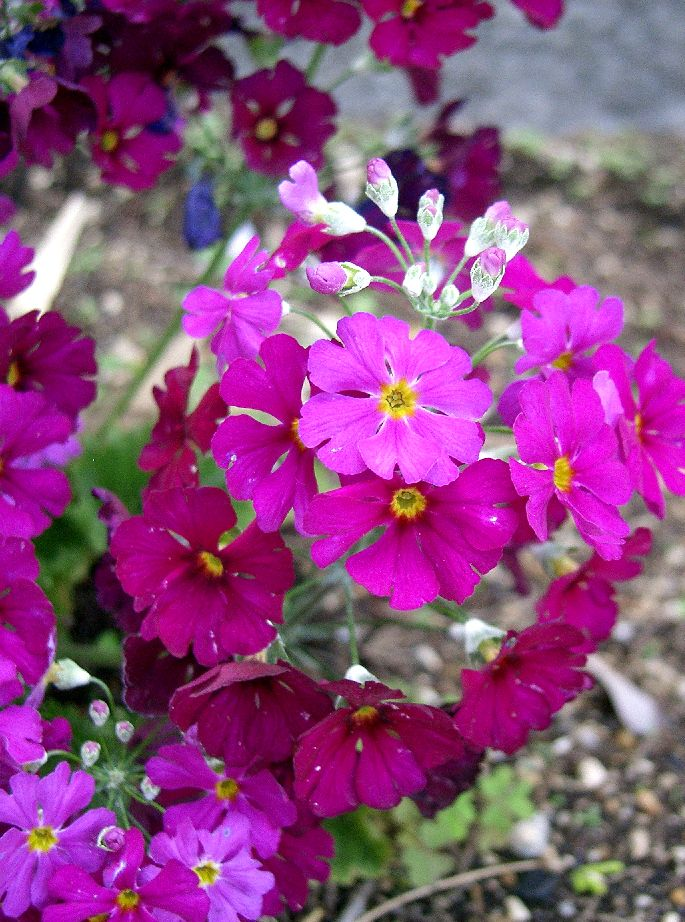

Scientific classification
- Kingdom: Plantae
- Clade: Tracheophytes
- Clade: Angiosperms
- Clade: Eudicots
- Clade: Asterids
- Order: Ericales
- Family: Primulaceae
- Genus: Primula
- Species: P. malacoides

Binomial name
- Primula malacoides Franch.

Synonyms
- Auganthus malacoides (Franch.) Soják; Primula delicata Petitm.

= Primula malacoides =

Species of flowering plant

Primula malacoides, called the fairy primrose or baby primrose, is a perennial species of Primula native to the Himalayas, Assam in India, Myanmar, and south-central and south east China. It has gained the Royal Horticultural Society's Award of Garden Merit.

== Description ==
This plant usually has purple flowers, although some may have red, white or bright-pink flowers.

Their hairy leaves measure at 4–8cm and are a pale-green colour. They usually grow to 30cm across and 20–40cm tall.

== History ==
This species was considered a weed as it would grow on the rice fields of Chinese farmers. This plant was cultivated from a seed by George Forrest in 1908. This species started to gain popularity among commercial growers in England. Within a decade, a new strain which was colourful and fragrant was sold commercially in greenhouses in the USA and throughout Europe.

== Cultivation ==
This plant can be propagated by seed or by division in late summer.

This species is a popular ornamental place and can be used as a houseplant or as a greenhouse plant.

It should be grown in fertile, well-drained soil with regular waterings.

== Pests and disease ==
This plant is prone to infestation by aphids. Signs of infestation may include: honeydew secretion, galls, and distortion of leaves.

== Toxicity ==
The leaves may cause irritation. It is advised to wear gloves when handling this plant.

This species may also have allergenic properties with symptoms including rashes and headaches.

== See also ==
- Flora of India
- Flora of China
- List of primula diseases
