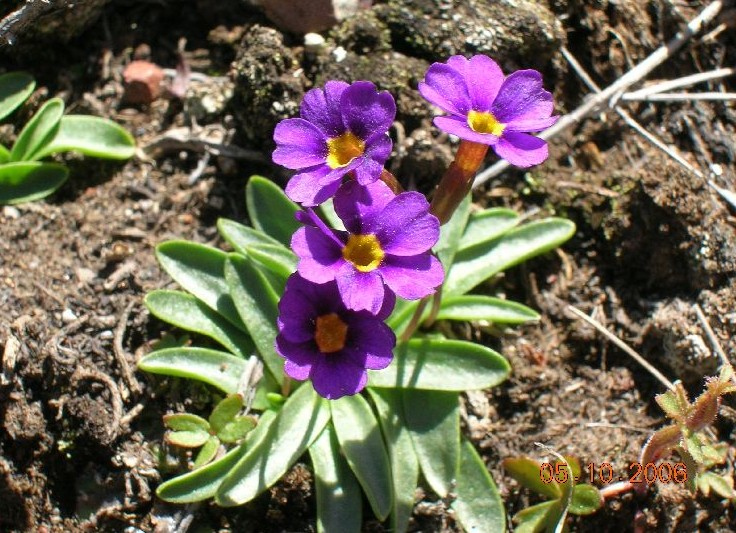
- var. cusickiana

Conservation status
- Apparently Secure (NatureServe)

Scientific classification
- Kingdom: Plantae
- Clade: Tracheophytes
- Clade: Angiosperms
- Clade: Eudicots
- Clade: Asterids
- Order: Ericales
- Family: Primulaceae
- Genus: Primula
- Species: P. cusickiana

Binomial name
- Primula cusickiana A.Gray

= Primula cusickiana =

Species of flowering plant

Primula cusickiana is a species of flowering plant in the primrose family known by the common name Cusick's primrose. It is native to the western United States in and around the Great Basin. Its distribution extends into Oregon, Idaho, Nevada, and Utah.

There are four varieties of this species:

- P. c. var. cusickiana occurs in Oregon, Idaho, and Nevada
- P. c. var. domensis, House Range primrose, is endemic to Utah.
- P. c. var. maguirei (syn. Primula maguirei), Maguire's primrose, is a federally listed threatened species known only from one canyon in Cache County, Utah.
- P. c. var. nevadensis, Nevada primrose, is endemic to Nevada.
