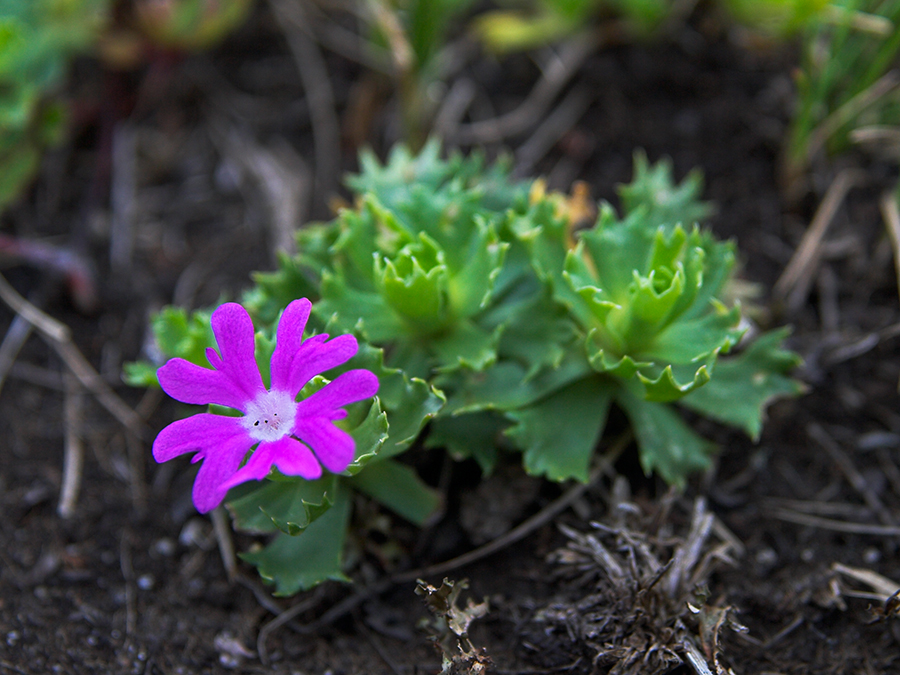
- Flower
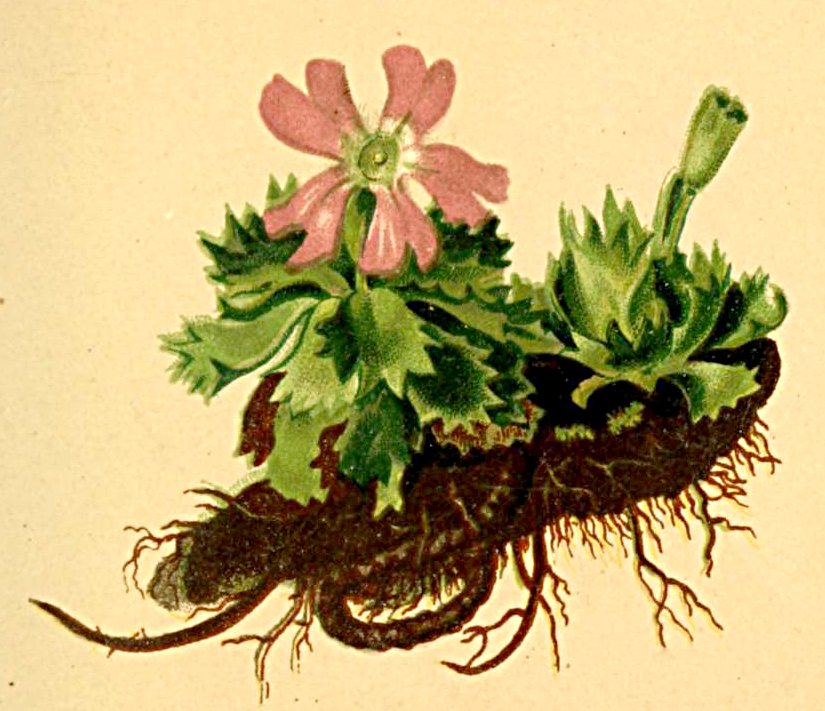
- Botanical illustration

Scientific classification
- Kingdom: Plantae
- Clade: Tracheophytes
- Clade: Angiosperms
- Clade: Eudicots
- Clade: Asterids
- Order: Ericales
- Family: Primulaceae
- Genus: Primula
- Species: P. minima

Binomial name
- Primula minima L.

Synonyms
- List: Aretia minima (L.) Link; Aretia truncata Link; Auricula minima (L.) Spach; Auricula villosa Spach; Auricula-ursi minima (L.) Soják; Kablikia minima (L.) Opiz; Kablikia truncata (Lehm.) Opiz; Primula minima f. alba Bercht. & J.Presl; Primula minima f. caulescens Wimm. & Grab.; Primula minima var. caulescens Wimm. & Grab.; Primula minima f. fimbriata Tausch; Primula minima var. multidentata Sünd.; Primula minima f. subacaulis Wimm. & Grab.; Primula minima var. subacaulis Wimm. & Grab.; Primula pseudoforsteri Dalla Torre & Sarnth.; Primula sauteri Schultz; Primula truncata Lehm.

= Primula minima =

Species of plant

Primula minima, the fairy primrose (a name it shares with Primula malacoides), is a species of flowering plant in the family Primulaceae, native to the eastern Alps, Carpathians, and Balkan mountain ranges. Although it is a high-elevation species, it relies more than expected on seed dispersal than clonal propagation. It is occasionally available from commercial suppliers.

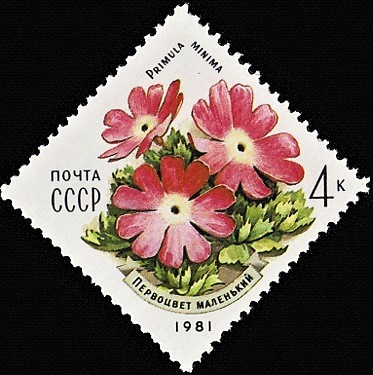
On a Soviet postage stamp

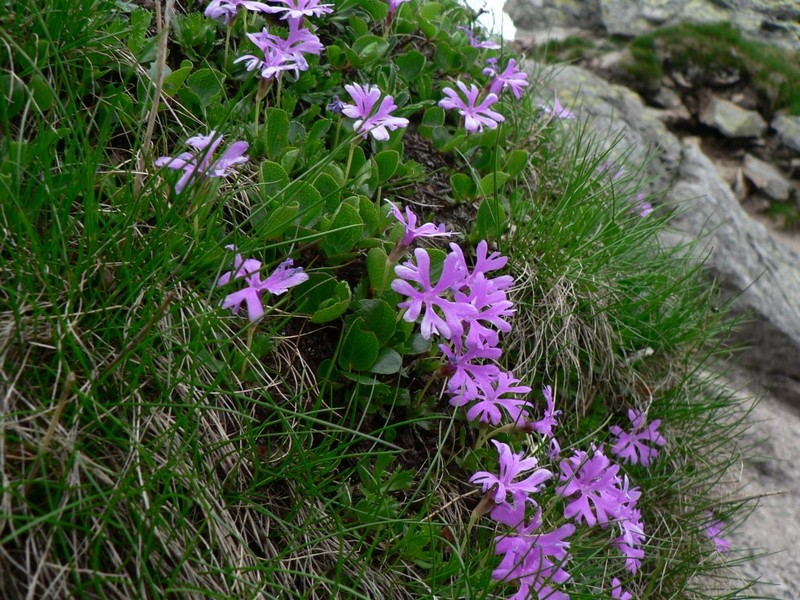
Grouping

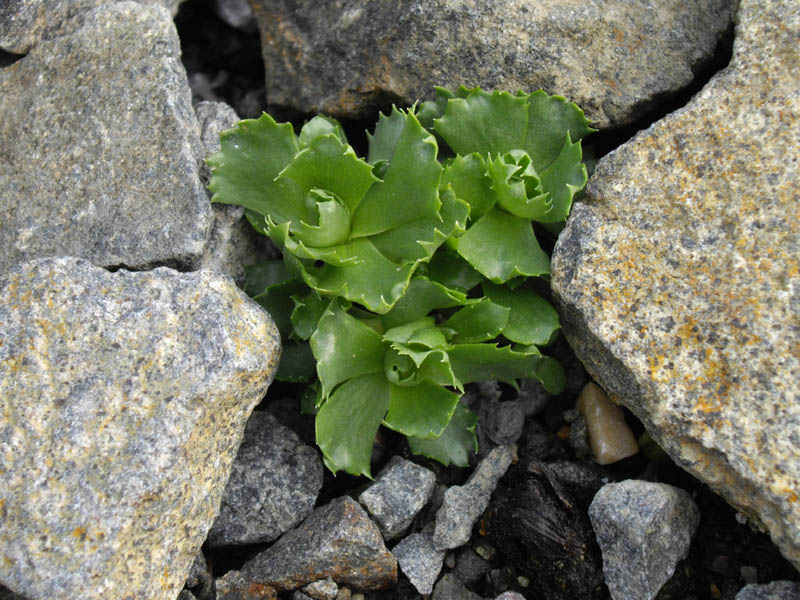
Leaves
