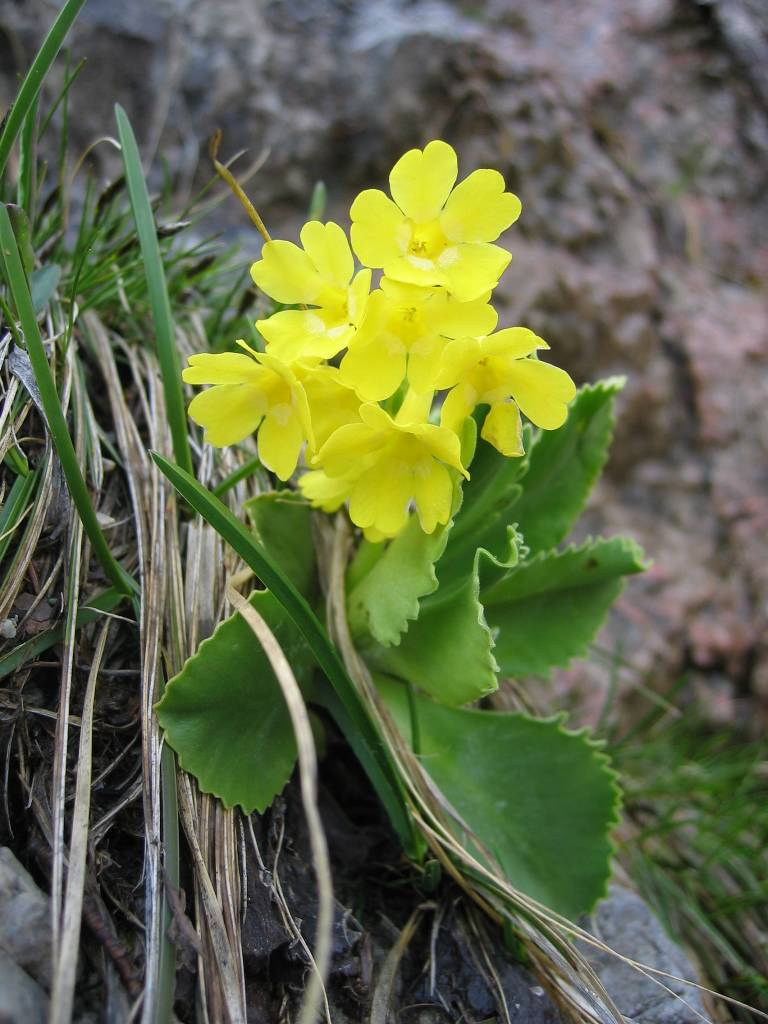

Scientific classification
- Kingdom: Plantae
- Clade: Embryophytes
- Clade: Tracheophytes
- Clade: Spermatophytes
- Clade: Angiosperms
- Clade: Eudicots
- Clade: Asterids
- Order: Ericales
- Family: Primulaceae
- Genus: Primula
- Species: P. auricula

Binomial name
- Primula auricula L.

= Primula auricula =

Species of flowering plant

Primula auricula, often known as auricula, mountain cowslip or bear's ear (from the shape of its leaves), is a species of flowering plant in the family Primulaceae, that grows on basic rocks in the mountain ranges of central Europe, including the western Alps, Jura Mountains, the Vosges, the Black Forest and the Tatra Mountains.

== Description ==
It is an evergreen perennial growing to 20 cm (8 in) tall by 25 cm (10 in) wide. The leaves are obovate and stalkless, with a cartilaginous edge, all growing in a basal rosette, and sometimes covered in a mealy white bloom. The yellow flowers grow in clusters on 5–20 cm (2–8 in) long stalks.

The specific epithet auricula means "ear-shaped", and refers to the shape of the leaves.

== Taxonomy ==
A recent study split the species into two, Primula lutea and P. auricula, with the former being found further south and east (Apennines, Carpathians, Balkans, and the southern and eastern Alps). Prior to this study, P. lutea had been considered synonymous with P. auricula. Other synonyms of P. auricula include P. balbisii and P. ciliata.

== Cultivation ==
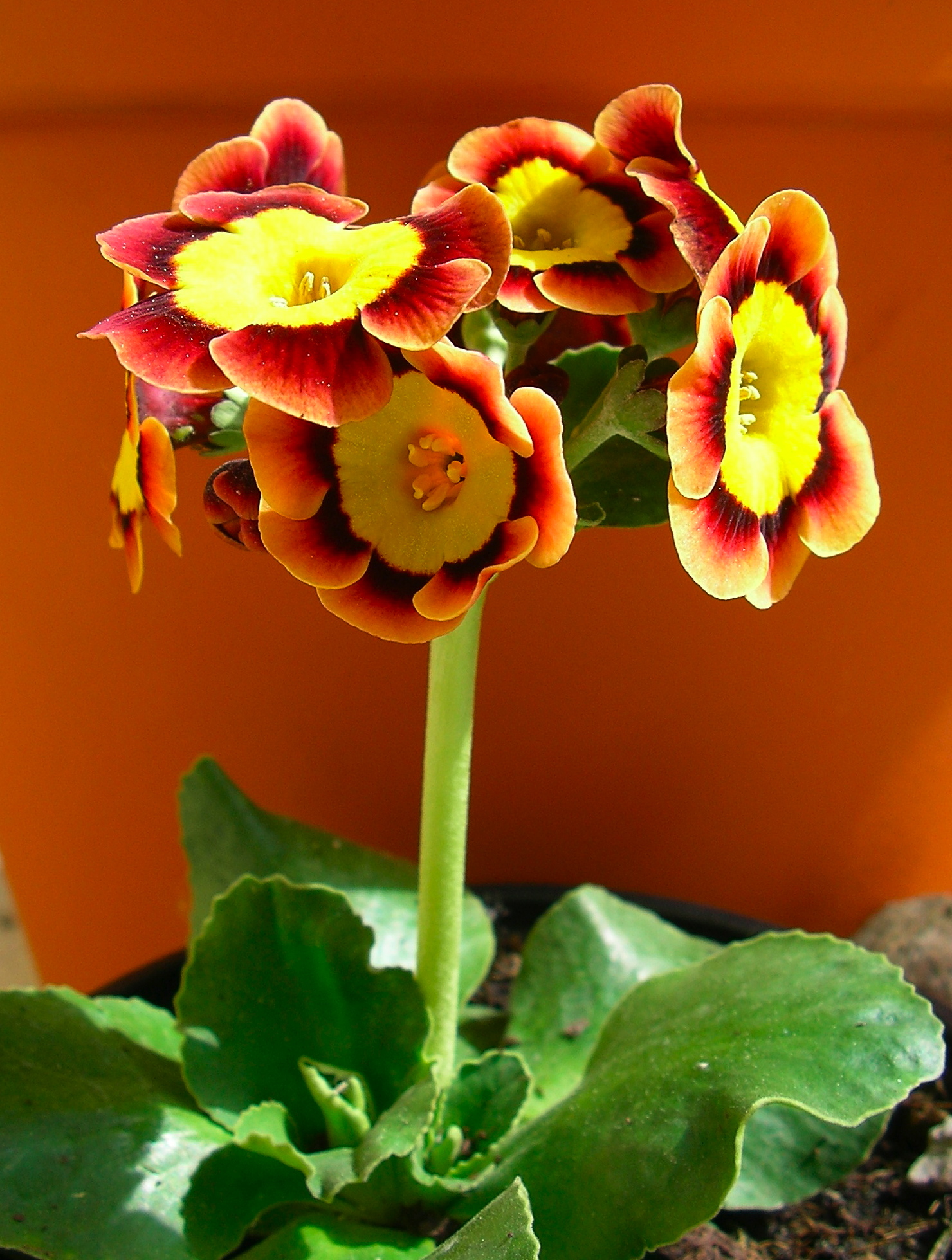
An auricula cultivar

This plant has gained the Royal Horticultural Society's Award of Garden Merit. In the UK two National Collections of auriculas are held by Hillview Hardy Plants nursery, on a 1 acre (0.4 ha) plot in Worfield, Shropshire.

=== Auriculas ===
The term auricula is also used collectively for plants which have been developed from a hybrid between P. auricula and P. hirsuta. Thousands of cultivars are available in a wide range of colours, and several societies are devoted to their cultivation and display.

Primula auricula is depicted on the obverse side of the Austrian €0.05 euro coins.

== Sources ==
- Zhang, L-B., & J. W. Kadereit (2004): Classification of Primula sect. Auricula (Primulaceae) based on two molecular data sets (ITS, AFLPs), morphology and geographical distribution. Botanical Journal of the Linnean Society 146: 1–26.
- Zhang, L-B. & J. W. Kadereit (2005): Typification and synonymization in Primula sect. Auricula (Primulaceae). Taxon 54 (3): 775–788.
