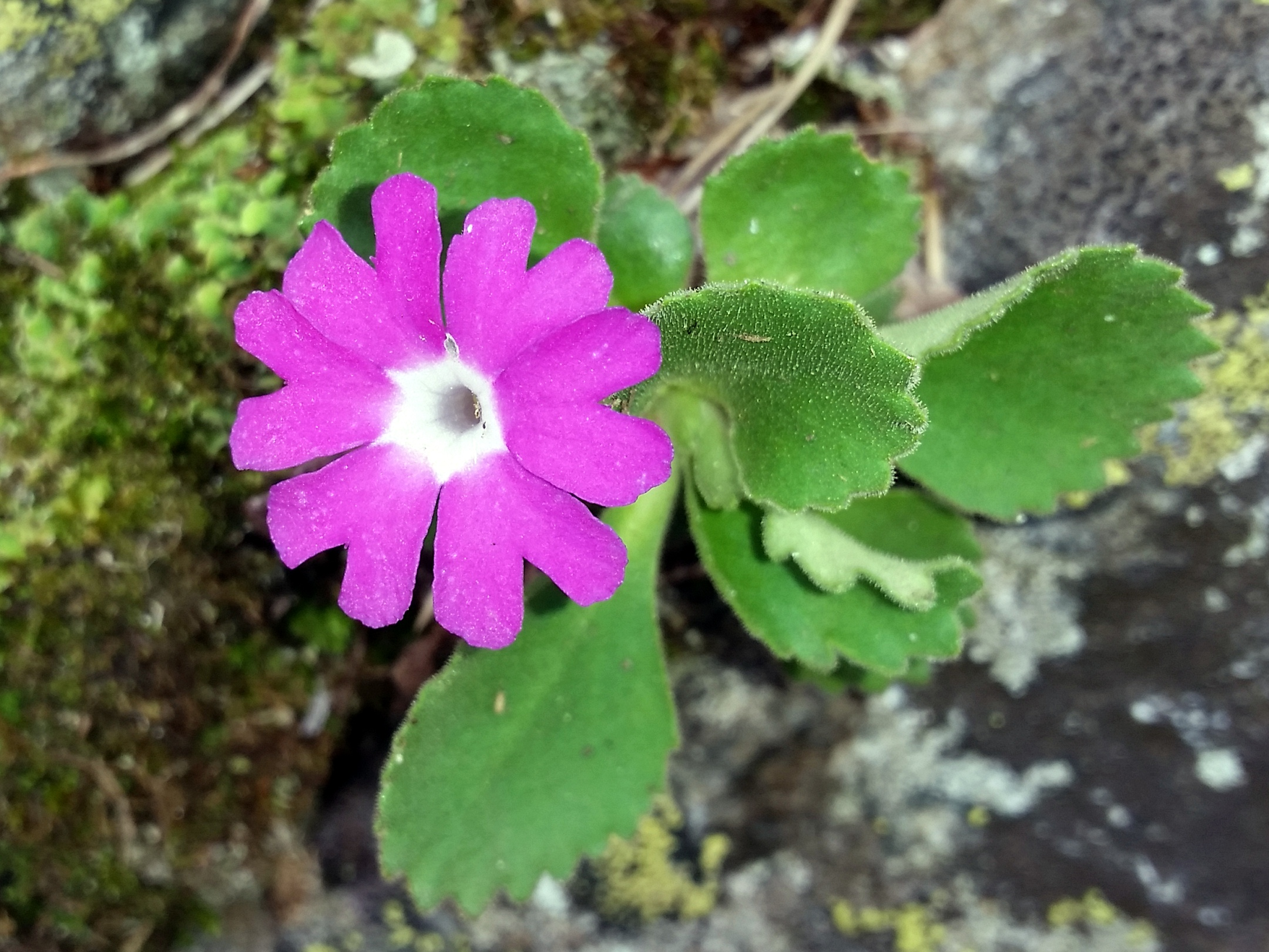
- Close-up of flower
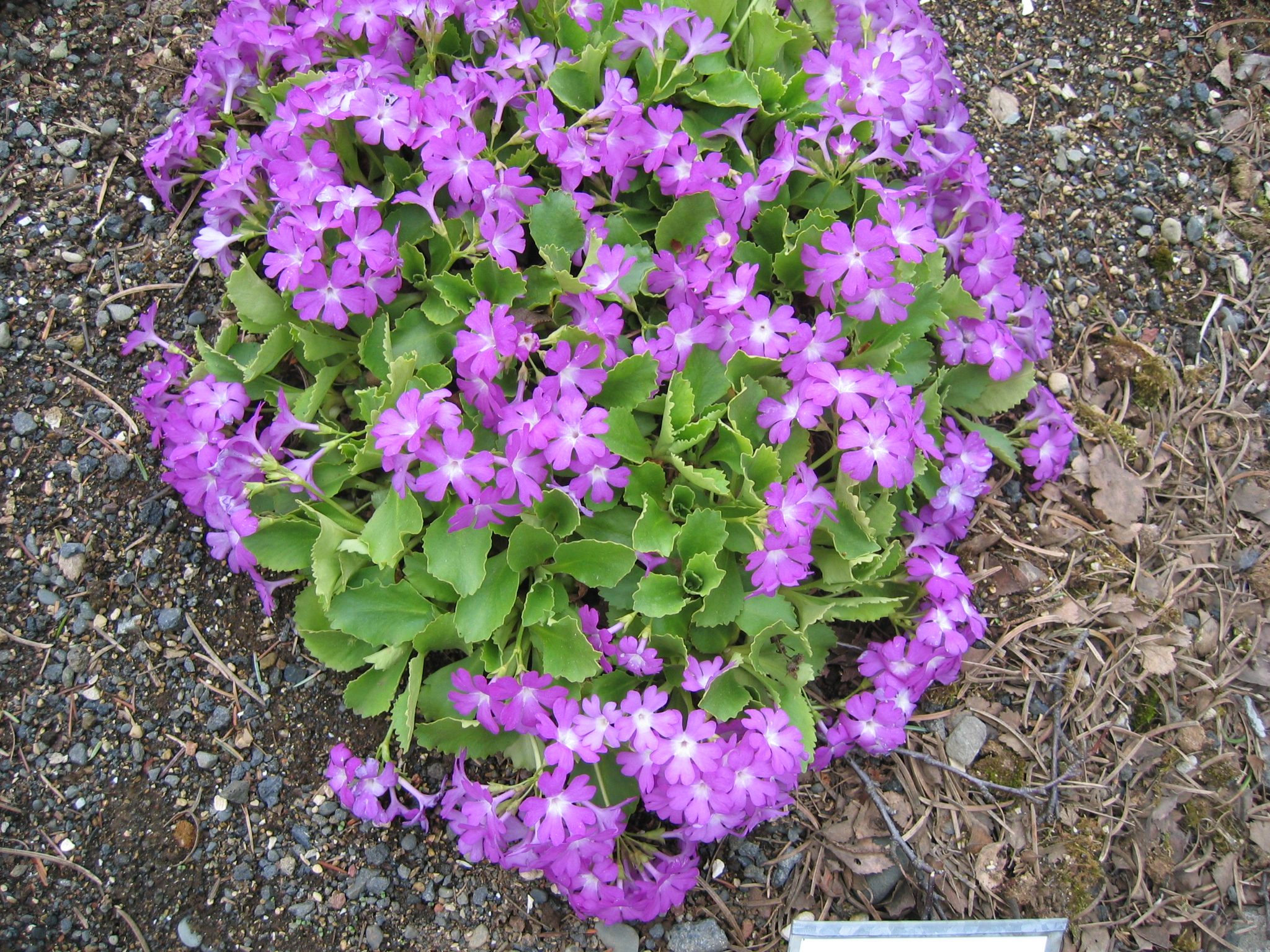
- At the Reykjavík Botanic Garden

Scientific classification
- Kingdom: Plantae
- Clade: Tracheophytes
- Clade: Angiosperms
- Clade: Eudicots
- Clade: Asterids
- Order: Ericales
- Family: Primulaceae
- Genus: Primula
- Species: P. hirsuta

Binomial name
- Primula hirsuta All.

Synonyms
- List: Aretia ciliata Link; Auricula-ursi hirsuta (All.) Soják; Primula ciliata Schrank; Primula confinis Schott ex Rchb.; Primula decipiens Stein ex Kolb; Primula decora Sims; Primula exscapa Hegetschw.; Primula glutinosa All.; Primula grignensis D.M.Moser; Primula hirsuta var. alpina (Rouy) Rouy; Primula hirsuta var. angustata (Widmer) Pax; Primula hirsuta f. angustata (Widmer) Lüdi; Primula hirsuta var. ciliata (Schrank) Arcang.; Primula hirsuta f. confinis (Schott ex Rchb.) Lüdi; Primula hirsuta f. exscapa (Hegetschw.) Lüdi; Primula hirsuta var. exscapa (Hegetschw.) Pax; Primula hirsuta subf. nivea (Sims) Lüdi; Primula hirsuta f. nivea Sims; Primula hirsuta var. pallida (Schott) Pax; Primula hirsuta f. pallida (Schott) Lüdi; Primula hirsuta var. pyrenaica (Rouy) Rouy; Primula hirsuta var. serrulata Beauverd; Primula latifolia W.D.J.Koch; Primula nelsonii Stein; Primula nivalis Farrer; Primula pallida Schott; Primula rubra J.F.Gmel.; Primula valcuvianensis (S.Jess. & L.Lehm.) Cristof. & Crema; Primula villosa var. viscosa (Vill.) Fiori; Primula viscosa Vill.; Primula viscosa var. alpina Rouy; Primula viscosa var. angustata Widmer; Primula viscosa f. frigida Widmer; Primula viscosa var. major Gaudin; Primula viscosa var. minor Gaudin; Primula viscosa var. pyrenaica Rouy

= Primula hirsuta =

Species of plant

Primula hirsuta, the hairy primrose, is a species of flowering plant in the family Primulaceae. It is native to the central Pyrenees and the Alps, and it has been introduced to Germany. A clump-forming evergreen perennial reaching 10 cm (4 in) (sometimes larger), it is found in the subalpine biome from 220 to 3,600 m (700 to 11,800 ft). It is available from commercial suppliers.

== Subtaxa ==
The following subspecies are accepted:

- Primula hirsuta subsp. brevipilosa Kress – Italy
- Primula hirsuta subsp. hirsuta – entire range
- Primula hirsuta subsp. longipilosa Kress – Italy
- Primula hirsuta subsp. valcuvianensis S.Jess. & L.Lehm. – southern Alps
