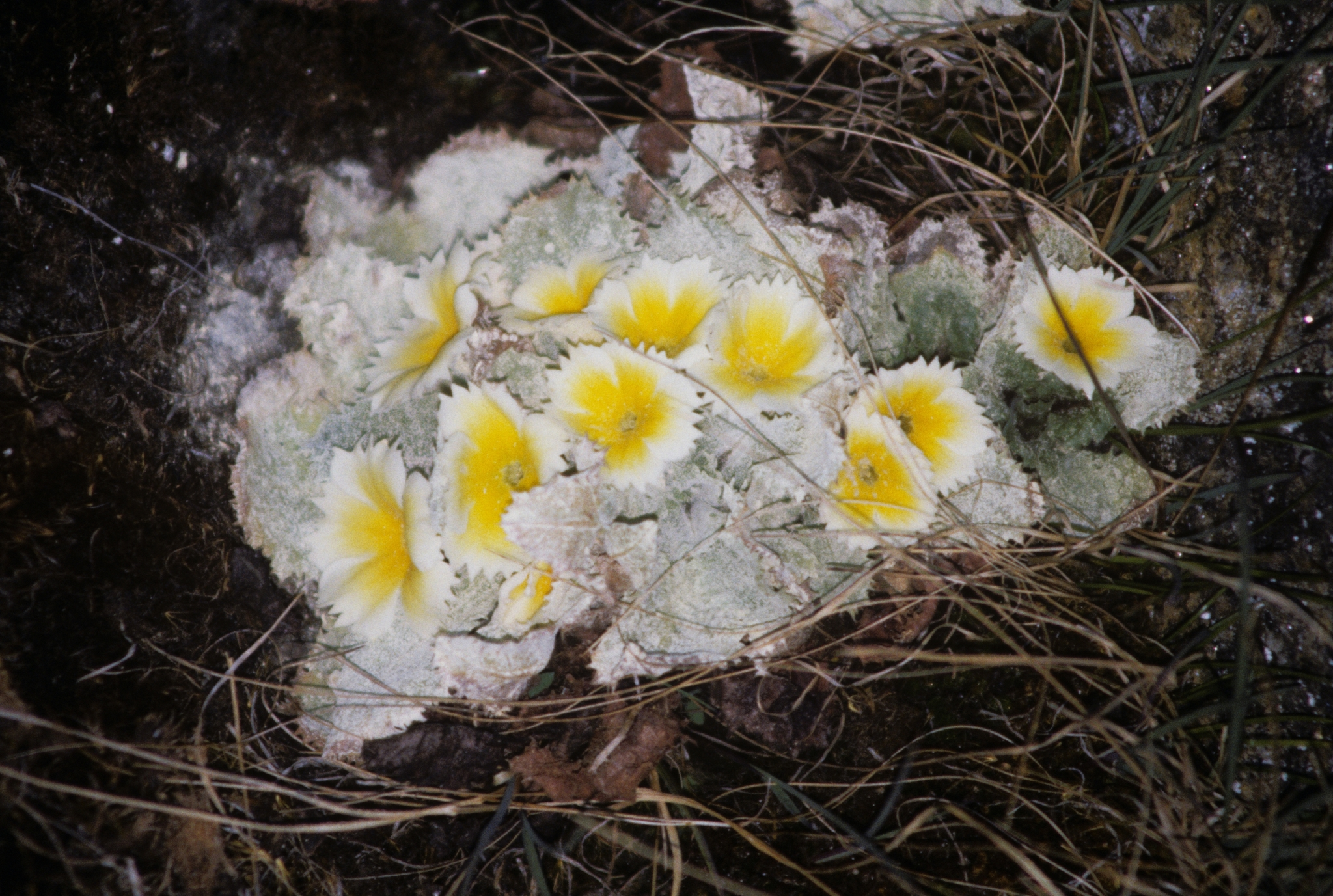

Scientific classification
- Kingdom: Plantae
- Clade: Tracheophytes
- Clade: Angiosperms
- Clade: Eudicots
- Clade: Asterids
- Order: Ericales
- Family: Primulaceae
- Genus: Primula
- Species: P. aureata

Binomial name
- Primula aureata H.R.Fletcher

= Primula aureata =

Species of flowering plant

Primula aureata is a species of flowering plant from the family Primulaceae.

== Description ==
Primula aureata is a perennial plant growing up to 5cm tall. The leaves are broad with rounded tips, they form a rosette around the base of the plant. They are also irregularly toothed to give a sharp appearance. Leaves are coated in a silvery white farina. Flowers are white around the rim and yellow towards the centre. Each petal is also toothed.

Primula aureata also has a subspecies known as Primula aureata fimbriata, which possess much smaller flowers.

== Distribution and habitat ==
This species is native to Nepal and the Eastern Himalayas. In Nepal it can be found growing in both Langtang and Gosainkund. Primula aureata grows in rocky habitats, on steep, sometimes vertical mountain faces at altitudes between 3600 and 4300m. P. aureata can also be found living nearby to water sources such as rivers and lakes. It can even occasionally be found growing under waterfalls.
