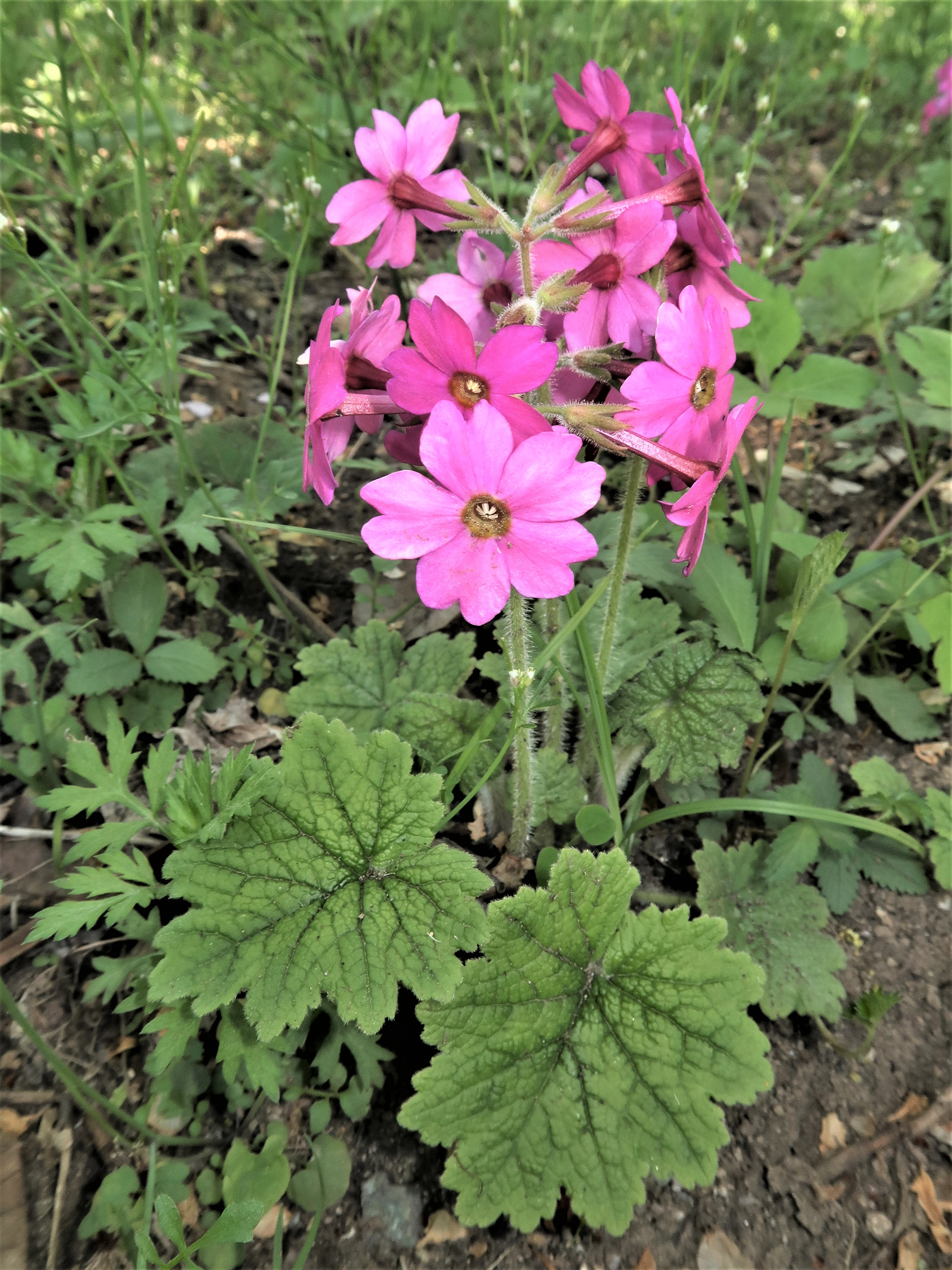
- In bloom

Scientific classification
- Kingdom: Plantae
- Clade: Tracheophytes
- Clade: Angiosperms
- Clade: Eudicots
- Clade: Asterids
- Order: Ericales
- Family: Primulaceae
- Genus: Primula
- Species: P. kisoana

Binomial name
- Primula kisoana Miq.

Synonyms
- Auganthus kisoanus (Miq.) Soják; Primula shikokiana (Makino) Nakai

= Primula kisoana =

Species of flowering plant

Primula kisoana, the hardy primrose or Mount Kiso primrose, is a species of flowering plant in the family Primulaceae, native to the Honshu and Shikoku islands of Japan. Hardy to USDA zone 4, it does well in partly shady situations under trees and along paths. A number of cultivars with flowers of different shades of pink are available.
