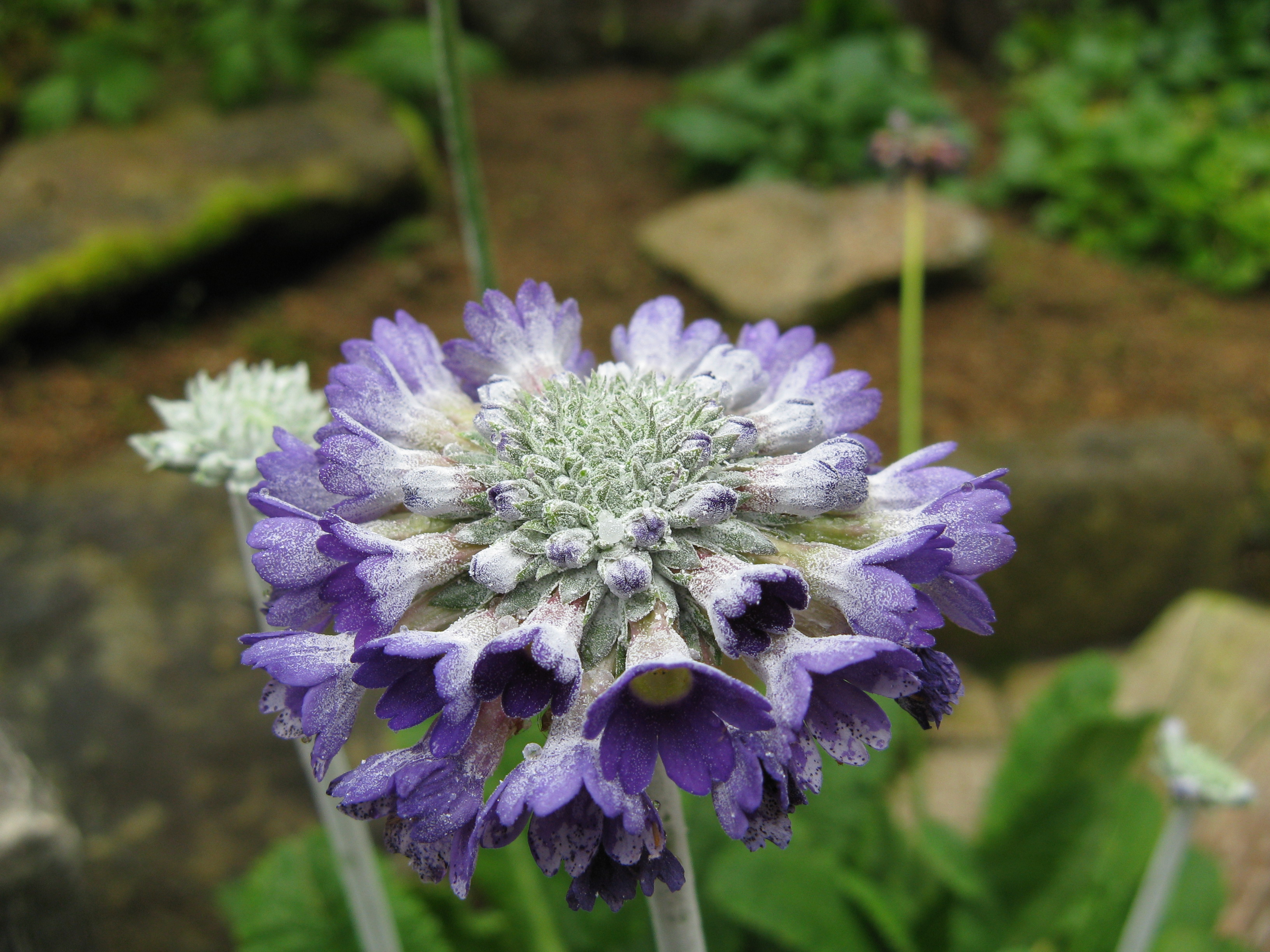

Scientific classification
- Kingdom: Plantae
- Clade: Tracheophytes
- Clade: Angiosperms
- Clade: Eudicots
- Clade: Asterids
- Order: Ericales
- Family: Primulaceae
- Genus: Primula
- Species: P. capitata

Binomial name
- Primula capitata Hook.

= Primula capitata =

Species of flowering plant

Primula capitata, commonly known as the round-headed Himalayan primrose or Asiatic primrose is a species of flowering plant in the family Primulaceae. It is a short-lived perennial, forming semi-evergreen rosettes of 15 cm (5.9 in) pale green, mealy leaves that are finely toothed, oblong-lance-shaped or inversely lance-shaped, with white-mealy undersides. Its flowers are up to 1 cm (0.39 in) long, dark purple and tubular, with shallowly lobed petals; they are borne in racemes that form flattened spheres, held on white-mealy stems about 40 cm (16 in) high.

Primula capitata is found in moist habitats in alpine areas of Bhutan, Tibet, and Sikkim state in India. Its putative subspecies Primula capitata subsp. sphaerocephala has gained the Royal Horticultural Society's Award of Garden Merit.
