= Primula hookeri =

Scientific classification
- Kingdom: Plantae
- Clade: Tracheophytes
- Clade: Angiosperms
- Clade: Eudicots
- Clade: Asterids
- Order: Ericales
- Family: Primulaceae
- Genus: Primula
- Species: P. hookeri

Binomial name
- Primula hookeri Watt.

Synonyms
- Primula vernicosa Ward. (1916)

Species of flowering plant

Primula hookeri (commonly known as Hooker's primrose) is a perennial species of primrose which is found at the altitudes of 3,900–5,000 metres (12,800–16,400 ft) in Eastern Himalayas as well as in Bhutan, Myanmar, Nepal, Northeast India and southeastern Tibet and northwestern Yunnan provinces of China.

== Description ==
The species' leaves are subsessile, are 1.5–4 centimetres (0.59–1.57 in) by 0.6–1.5 centimetres (0.24–0.59 in) and are slightly emergent from basal scales at anthesis. The scales themselves are 0.5–2 centimetres (0.20–0.79 in) long, reddish in color, and are oblong and ovate. The scapes' length is less than 3 millimetres (0.12 in) which includes the leaves which become elongated near the fruit part. Corolla is with a stamen and is white or bluish-violet in color with 7–8 millimetres (0.28–0.31 in) long tube and 7–10 millimetres (0.28–0.39 in) wide limb. P. hookeri have an oblong and nearly erect lobes which are subtruncate and a little bit emarginated at the apex. The bracts are linear and subulate and are 5–7 millimetres (0.20–0.28 in). The pedicel is glandular and is 1–2 millimetres (0.039–0.079 in). Flowers homostylous. Calyx is broadly bell-shaped, is minutely glandular and is 5–8 millimetres (0.20–0.31 in) long, but parted near the middle. Flowers are of yellow color.
