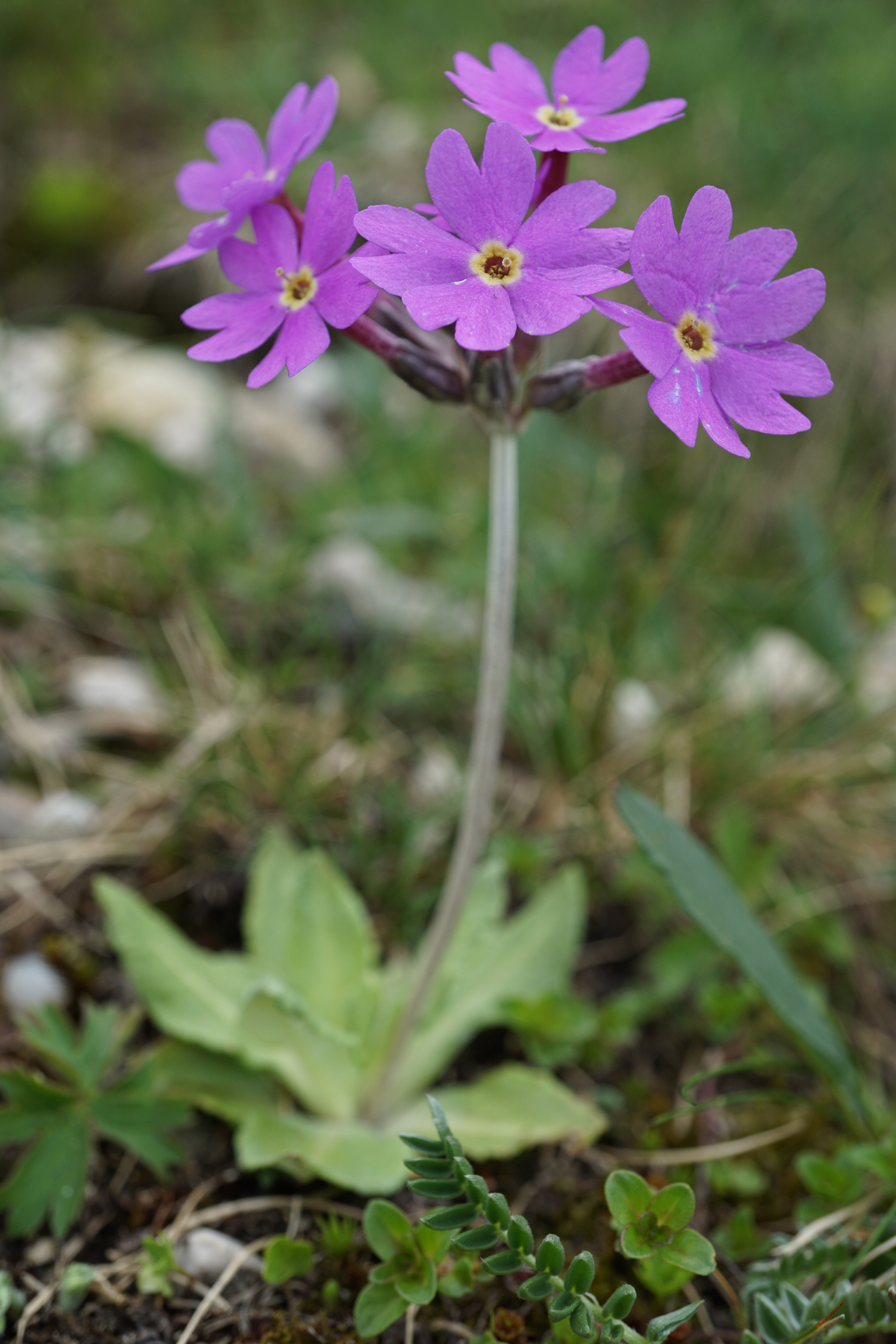
- Habit
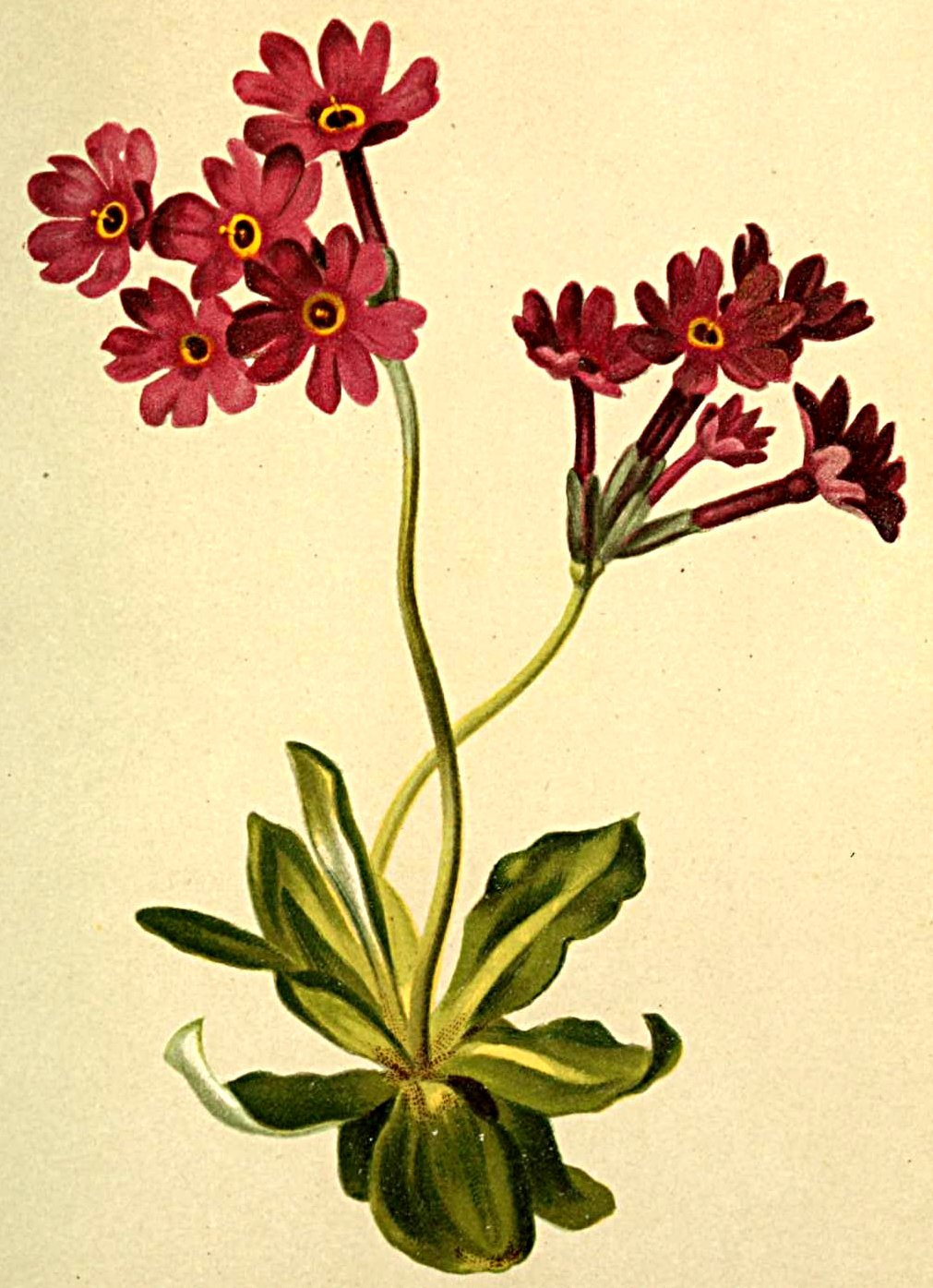
- Botanical illustration

Scientific classification
- Kingdom: Plantae
- Clade: Tracheophytes
- Clade: Angiosperms
- Clade: Eudicots
- Clade: Asterids
- Order: Ericales
- Family: Primulaceae
- Genus: Primula
- Species: P. halleri

Binomial name
- Primula halleri J.F.Gmel.

Synonyms
- List: Aleuritia farinosa subsp. platyphylla (O.Schwarz) Soják; Aleuritia halleri (J.F.Gmel.) Soják; Aleuritia longiflora (All.) Spach; Primula farinosa subsp. longiflora (All.) Bonnier & Layens; Primula halleri subsp. platyphylla O.Schwarz; Primula longiflora All.

= Primula halleri =

Species of plant

Primula halleri, the long-flowered primrose, is a species of flowering plant in the family Primulaceae, native to the Alps, Carpathians, and some of the mountain ranges of the Balkan Peninsula. A perennial, it is found at elevations of 1,500 to 2,700 m (4,900 to 8,900 ft). Its main pollinator is the hummingbird hawk-moth Macroglossum stellatarum.

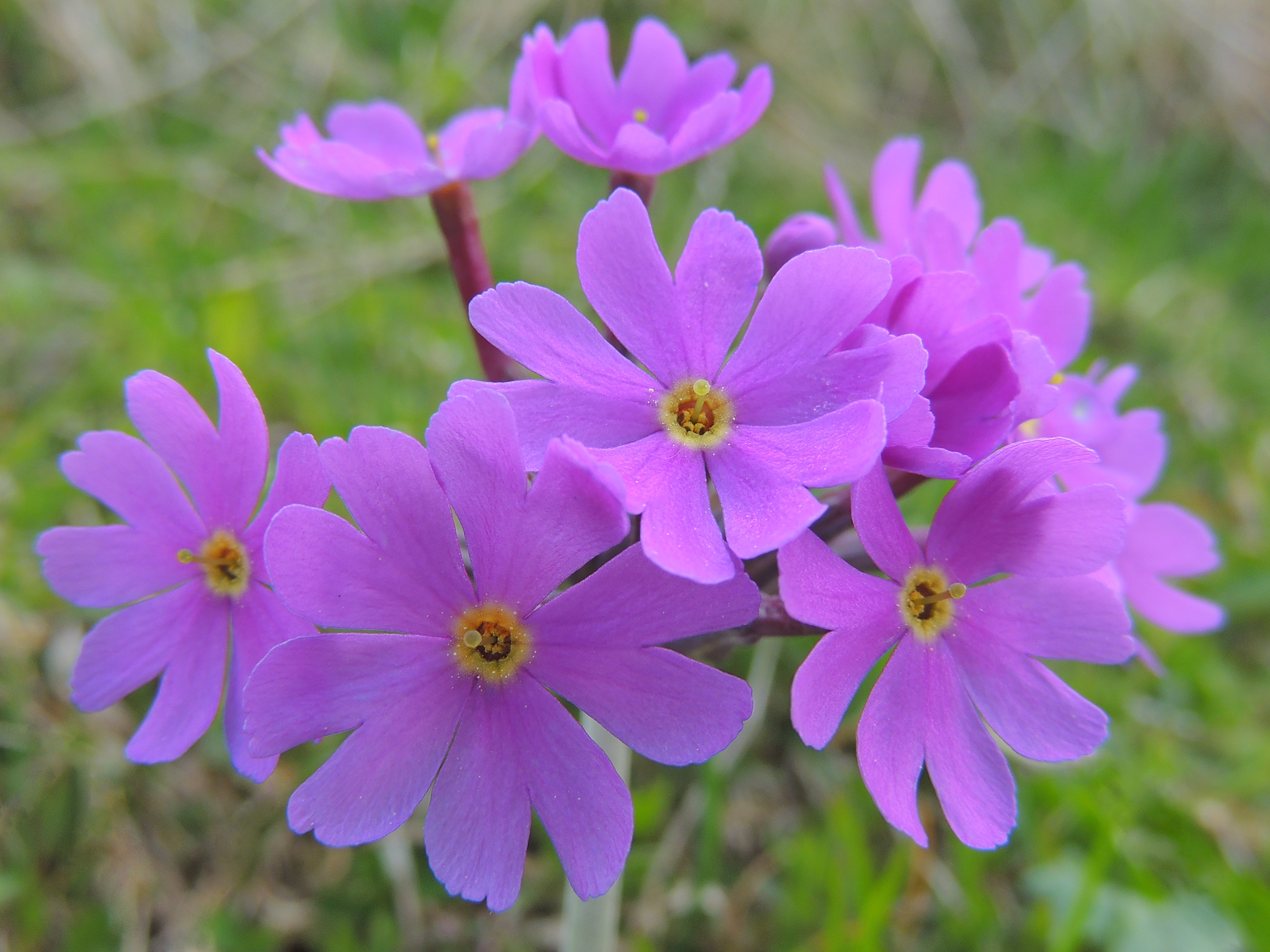
Flowers

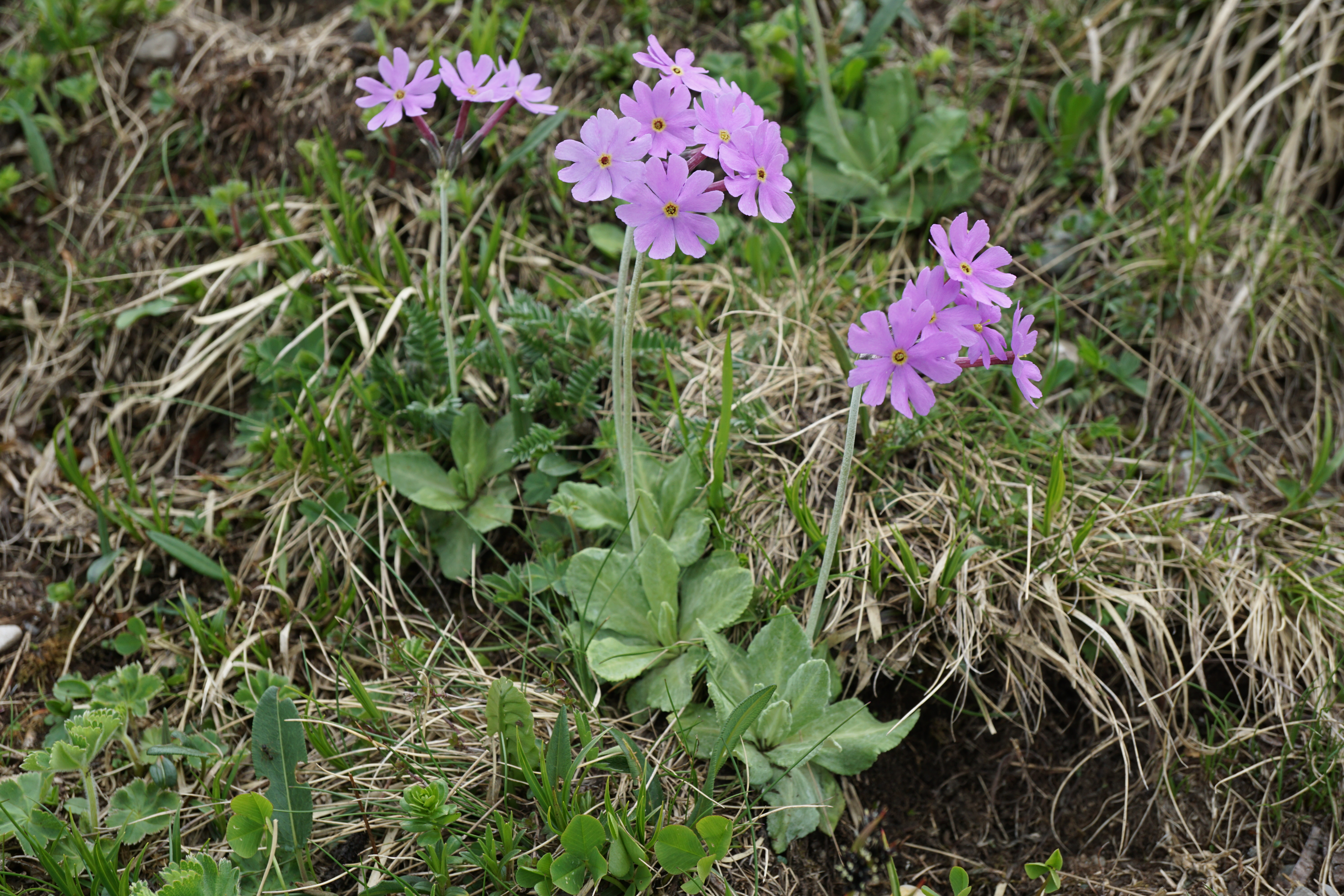
Group
