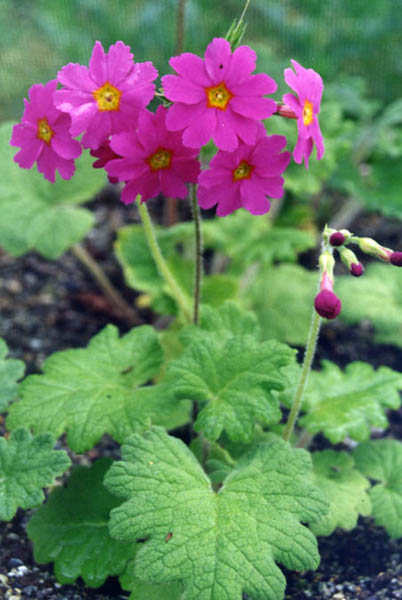

Scientific classification
- Kingdom: Plantae
- Clade: Tracheophytes
- Clade: Angiosperms
- Clade: Eudicots
- Clade: Asterids
- Order: Ericales
- Family: Primulaceae
- Genus: Primula
- Species: P. heucherifolia

Binomial name
- Primula heucherifolia Franch.

Synonyms
- Auganthus heucherifolius (Franch.) Soják; Primula gagnepainii Petitm.; Primula lanata Pax & K.Hoffm.; Primula oculata Duthie ex Balf.f.

= Primula heucherifolia =

Species of flowering plant

Primula heucherifolia is a species of flowering plant in the family Primulaceae.

== Description ==
Primula heucherifolia is a stoloniferous species with creeping rhizomes. Stems sprout from the base of the plant and are 15–30 cm in height. Plants bloom between May and June. Each stem can possess three to ten nodding flowers. Flowers can range from a lilac-mauve to a deep purple in colour. The leaves are sparsely hairy and possess an orbicular blade. Leaves range in length from 6–15 cm and width by 3–6 cm.

== Distribution and habitat ==
Primula heucherifolia is native to South-central China, where it can be found on the western side of the Sichuan province. It has been recorded growing at ranges of 2000–3200 metres above sea level. P. heucherifolia grows in shaded, cool and damp habitats. It is often found growing under the shelter of rocks, cliffs, trees and grasses. It can also be found growing within bamboo forests.
