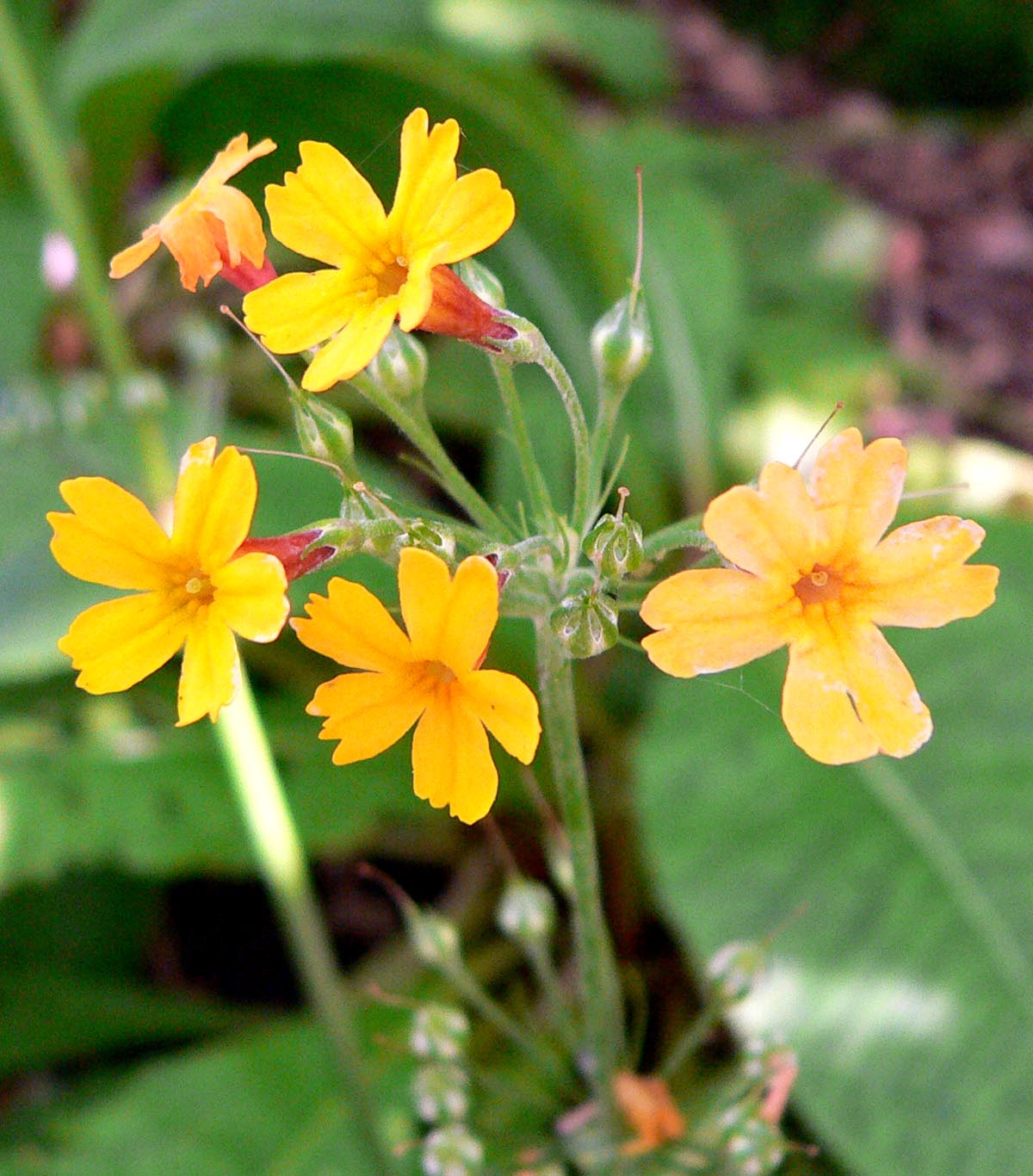

Scientific classification
- Kingdom: Plantae
- Clade: Tracheophytes
- Clade: Angiosperms
- Clade: Eudicots
- Clade: Asterids
- Order: Ericales
- Family: Primulaceae
- Genus: Primula
- Species: P. prolifera

Binomial name
- Primula prolifera Wall.

Synonyms
- Aleuritia prolifera; Primula helodoxa; Primula ianthina

= Primula prolifera =

Species of flowering plant

Primula prolifera, the candelabra primrose or glory of the bog, is a flowering plant in the family Primulaceae. Its botanical name is currently unresolved.

In cultivation it has won the Royal Horticultural Society's Award of Garden Merit.

== Description ==
It is an evergreen perennial with flowering stalks reaching up to 75 cm (30 in). The spoon-shaped, simple leaves are arranged in a basal rosette. The golden yellow, fragrant flowers are borne in whorls, measuring 2.5 cm across.

== Range ==
Primula prolifera is found in a range from the eastern Himalayas to Indonesia.
