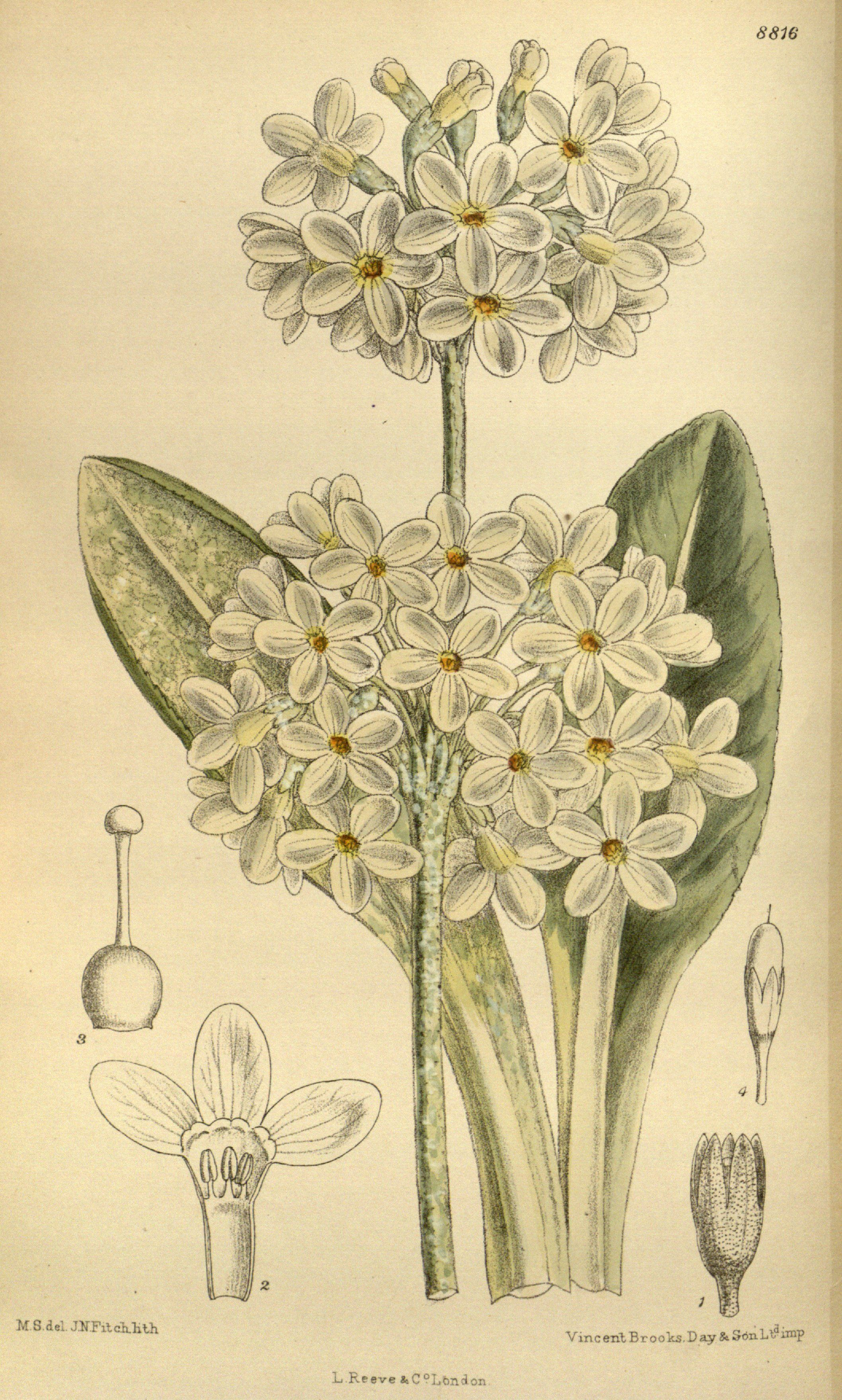
- Botanical illustration

Scientific classification
- Kingdom: Plantae
- Clade: Tracheophytes
- Clade: Angiosperms
- Clade: Eudicots
- Clade: Asterids
- Order: Ericales
- Family: Primulaceae
- Genus: Primula
- Species: P. chionantha

Binomial name
- Primula chionantha Balf.f. & Forrest

Synonyms
- List: Primula brevicula Balf.f. & Forrest; Primula chionantha subsp. sinopurpurea (Irving) A.J.Richards; Primula ingens W.W.Sm. & Forrest; Primula leucochnoa Hand.-Mazz.; Primula melanops W.W.Sm. & Kingdon-Ward

= Primula chionantha =

Species of flowering plant

Primula chionantha, the snow-white primrose, is a species of flowering plant in the family Primulaceae, native to Tibet, Sichuan and Yunnan in China. It has gained the Royal Horticultural Society's Award of Garden Merit.

== Subtaxa ==
The following subspecies are accepted:

- Primula chionantha subsp. brevicula (Balf.f. & Forrest) A.J.Richards – Yunnan
- Primula chionantha subsp. chionantha
- Primula chionantha subsp. melanops (W.W.Sm. & Kingdon-Ward) A.J.Richards – Sichuan
