= Primula tanneri =

Scientific classification
- Kingdom: Plantae
- Clade: Tracheophytes
- Clade: Angiosperms
- Clade: Eudicots
- Clade: Asterids
- Order: Ericales
- Family: Primulaceae
- Genus: Primula
- Species: P. tanneri

Binomial name
- Primula tanneri King

Species of flowering plant

Primula tanneri is a species of flowering plant in the family Primulaceae.

== Description ==
The species' bud scales are efarinose, ovate to oblong and are 2–5 centimetres (0.79–1.97 in) long. The leaves form a rosette which have winged petiole that is 1–3 centimetres (0.39–1.18 in) long. It have even longer leaf blade, measuring 2–10 by 2–7 centimetres (0.79 in–3.94 in × 0.79 in–2.76 in), efarinose, puberulous and is ovate to deltoid. The base itself is cordate and subsagittate with irregular margins, coarse dentate and acute apex. P. tanneri have 10–20 centimetres (3.9–7.9 in) long scapes which elongate, 45 centimetres (18 in) long near the fruit part and are farinose toward the apex. Umbels have 1-2 flowers with bracts that are acuminate to subulate and are 5–10 millimetres (0.20–0.39 in) long from the broad base. Pedicel is as farinose as the apex and is 1–3 centimetres (0.39–1.18 in) long. The flowers are heterostylous with tubular to campanulate sepals which are 7–10 millimetres (0.28–0.39 in) long. P. tanneri have an emarginated and lanceolated lobes which are obovate to oblong with a light to deep purple coloured corolla which can also be blue or white. Tubes of these species can be 1–3 centimetres (0.39–1.18 in) long while the limb is 2–2.5 centimetres (0.79–0.98 in) wide. Flowers are heterostyly with stamens toward the apex and bloom in May.

== Distribution and habitat ==
It is found in woodlands and grassy slopes at altitudes of around 3,600 metres (11,800 ft) in Bhutan, Nepal, Northeast India and southern Tibet.

== Subspecies and varieties ==
Subspecies and varieties of P. tanneri include:

- Primula tanneri subsp. nepalensis
- Primula tanneri subsp. tsariensis
- Primula tanneri var. porrecta
