= Primula minor =

Scientific classification
- Kingdom: Plantae
- Clade: Tracheophytes
- Clade: Angiosperms
- Clade: Eudicots
- Clade: Asterids
- Order: Ericales
- Family: Primulaceae
- Genus: Primula
- Species: P. minor

Binomial name
- Primula minor Balf.f. & Kingdon-Ward

Synonyms
- Primula atuntzuensis Balf.f. & Forrest; Primula helvenacea Balf.f. & Kingdon-Ward; Primula petraea Balf.f. & Forrest

Species of flowering plant

Primula minor is a species of flowering plant within the family Primulaceae. It was first described by Isaac Bayley Balfour and Frank Kingdon-Ward in 1915. It is a close relative of the species Primula graminifolia.

== Description ==
Primula minor is a dwarf perennial plant. Its leaves are green, elliptical and narrow, growing from 3-8 cm long. The leaf is cream on the underside. Each flower has five petals, which are purple in colour. The eye of the flower is white. The flower stalks are narrow and can grow up to 17 cm. The stalk can hold up to eight flowers on its tip.

== Distribution and habitat ==
Primula minor is endemic to western China. It is found in Northwest Yunnan at altitudes of 400 m or higher in both Bai Ma Shan and Da Xue Shan, growing on damp cliff faces and near waterfalls.
