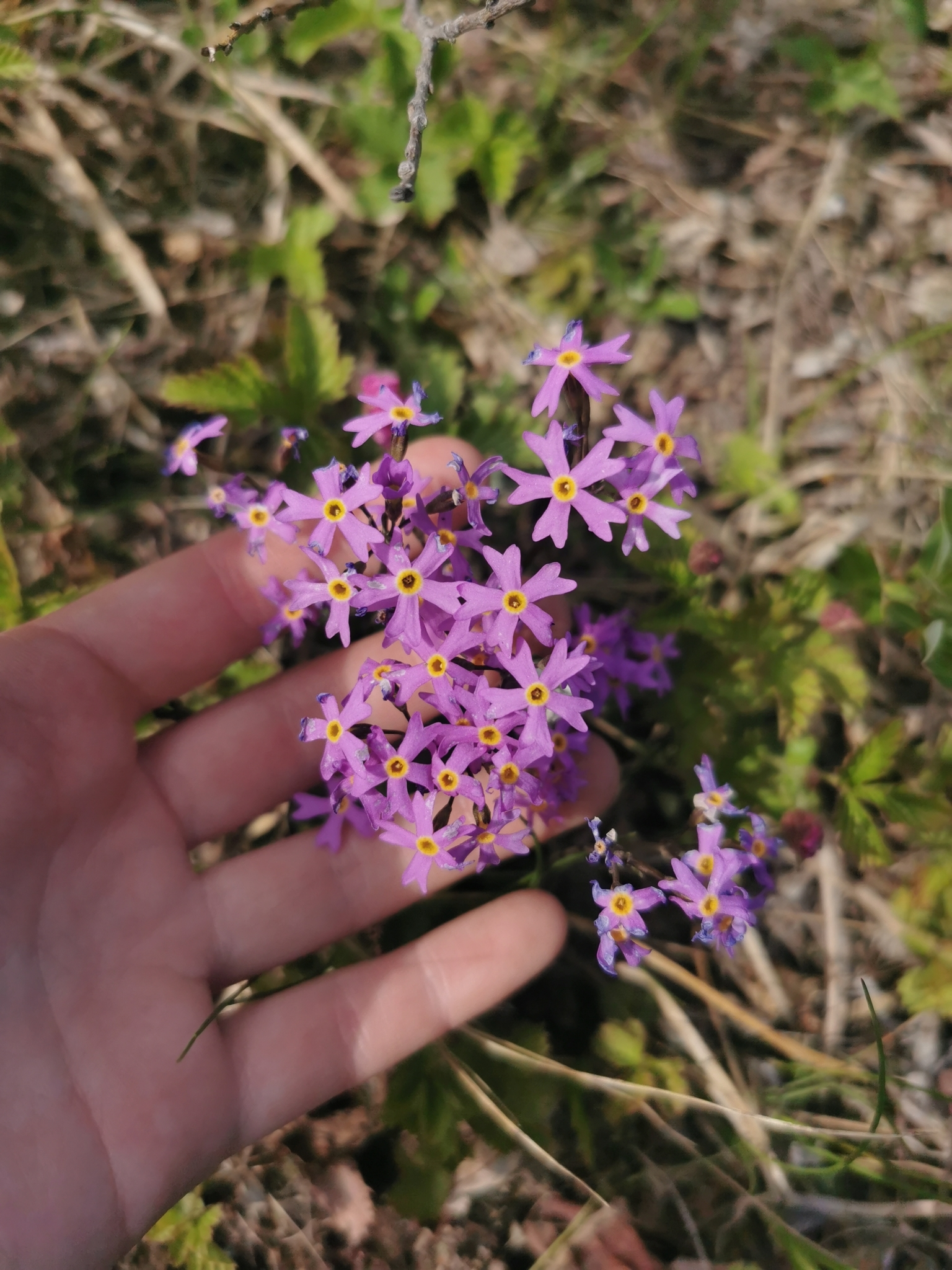
- The flowers of P. borealis
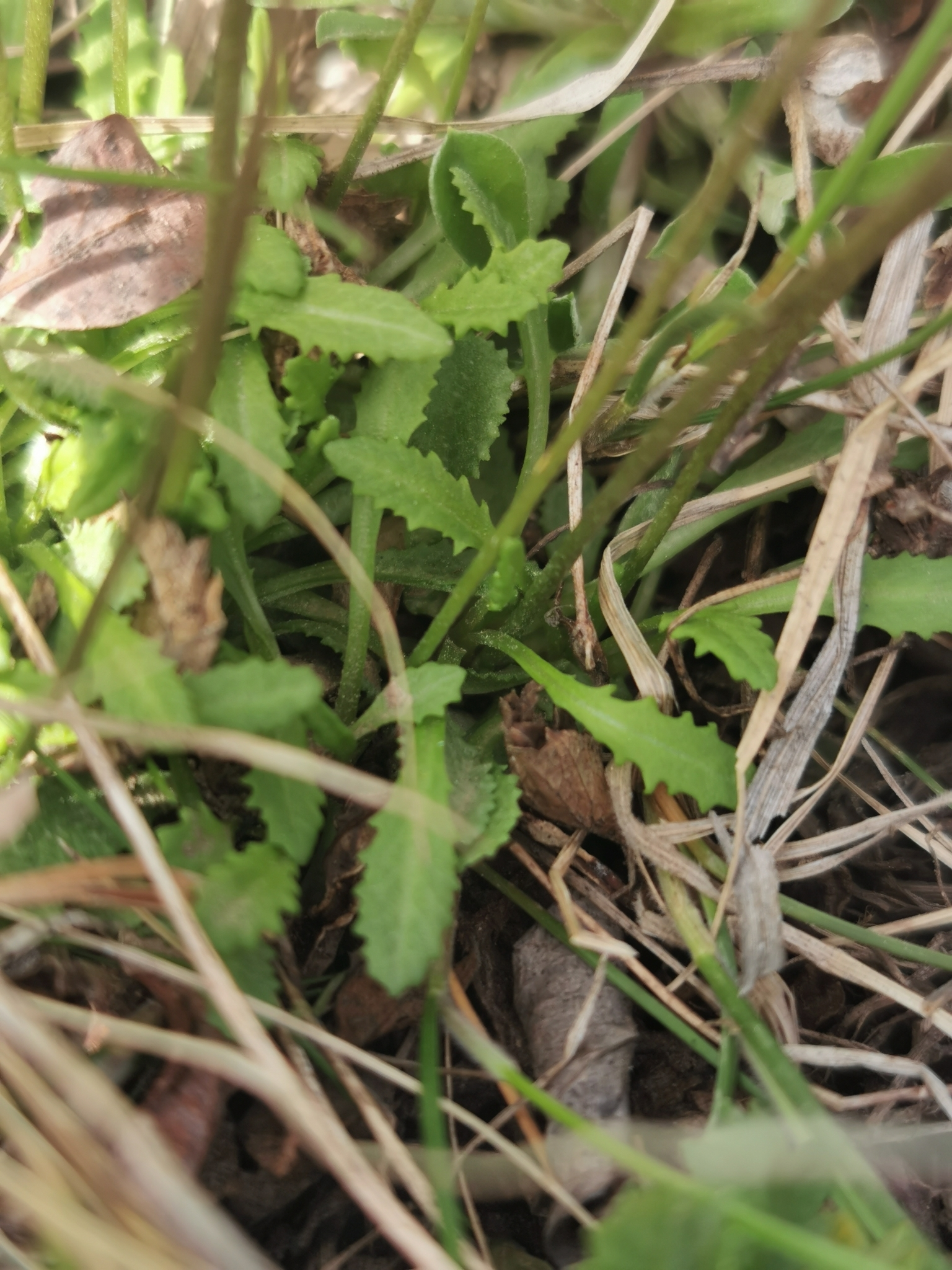
- The leaves of P. borealis

Scientific classification
- Kingdom: Plantae
- Clade: Tracheophytes
- Clade: Angiosperms
- Clade: Eudicots
- Clade: Asterids
- Order: Ericales
- Family: Primulaceae
- Genus: Primula
- Species: P. borealis

Binomial name
- Primula borealis Duby

Synonyms
- List: Aleuritia borealis (Duby) Soják; Primula sibirica var. borealis (Duby) Kurtz; Primula ajanensis E.A.Busch; Primula borealis var. ajanensis; Primula chamissonis E.A.Busch; Primula parvifolia Duby; Primula tenuis Small

= Primula borealis =

Species of flowering plant

Primula borealis, also known as the Northern primrose or slender primrose, is a species of flowering plant within the genus Primula and family Primulaceae. The species is a halophyte, inhabiting coastal saline habitats within subalpine and subarctic regions.

== Description ==
Primula borealis is a small herbaceous perennial plant, typically measuring between 1 and 12 centimetres in height. It possesses thin and short rhizomes, that give rise to shoots. Due to the rhizomes P. borealis possesses a clumping growth habit. P. borealis possesses both diploid and polyploid individuals, with a chromosome count of 2n = 18 and 36.

=== Leaves ===
The leaves of Primula borealis are not aromatic and have indistinct petioles, which are narrowly winged. The leaf blade is variable in shape, ranging from spatulate to rhombic. It typically measures between 1 and 3.5 cm in length and 0.1 to 0.7 cm in width. The leaves are thin in texture and have smooth surfaces devoid of deep reticulate veins on the underside. The margins of the leaves are crenate to remotely denticulate, exhibiting small rounded or tooth-like projections. The apex of the leaves is either obtuse or acute, depending on the individual plant. Overall, the leaves of P. borealis contribute to the plant's attractive foliage.

=== Flowers ===
Inflorescences of Primula borealis typically have 1 to 10 flowers, rising from the central rosette of leaves. The flowers can range in colour from the common lavender to a less common rosy violet or white. The involucral bracts, which surround the flowers, are notable for their saccate or gibbous shape at the base. These bracts are generally similar in size, contributing to the overall symmetry of the inflorescence. The pedicels are erect, measuring 2 to 8 mm in length. The pedicels are often more than twice the length of the bracts and exhibit a somewhat stiff texture.

The flowers of Primula borealis are heterostylous, indicating the presence of two different flower forms with varying styles and stamens. The calyx, which constitutes the outer whorl of the flower, can be green or have purple stripes. It is campanulate in shape, measuring 3 to 5 mm in length. The corolla, the inner whorl of the flower, is usually lavender in colour and exhibits notable characteristics. The corolla tube measures 6 to 8 mm in length, approximately 1.5 times the length of the calyx. The corolla lacks glands and has a limb with a diameter of 8 to 16 mm. The lobes of the corolla measure 0.4 to 0.8 mm and have emarginate apices, displaying small notches.

=== Fruit and seeds ===
Following successful pollination, Primula borealis produces capsules that are cylindric to somewhat ellipsoid in shape. The length of the capsules is approximately 1.5 times that of the calyx. Inside the capsules, the species produces seeds that lack flanged edges and possess a reticulate surface pattern.

== Distribution and habitat ==
Primula borealis is distributed within the Northern Hemisphere, occurring in specific regions of North America and Eastern Asia. In North America, P. borealis is found in the Northwest Territories and Yukon, both located in Canada. It is also known to occur in the state of Alaska in the United States. In eastern Asia, P. borealis is distributed across several areas. It is found in Beringia within the Kamchatka Peninsula located in the Far East of Russia. The species is also present in Khabarovsk, a region in the South-eastern Russia. Additionally, P. borealis can be found in Krasnoyarsk, a large territory in Siberia. P. borealis also extends its distribution to Magadan, a region in North-eastern Russia that experiences a subarctic climate.

Primula borealis is a halophyte, which inhabits subalpine and subarctic biomes. It is known to grow in coastal saline habitat such as estuaries, sand dunes and salt marshes. These areas are characterized by high salt concentrations in the soil and water. The species may also be found growing on floodplain meadows or in proximity to freshwater hot springs, often growing in damp clay deposits. Populations of the species possesses variation in characteristics depending on their habitat, with exposed sand dune habitats hosting depauperate individuals, while populations inhabiting sheltered and nutrient rich sites possess more flowers and a taller flowering stalk.
