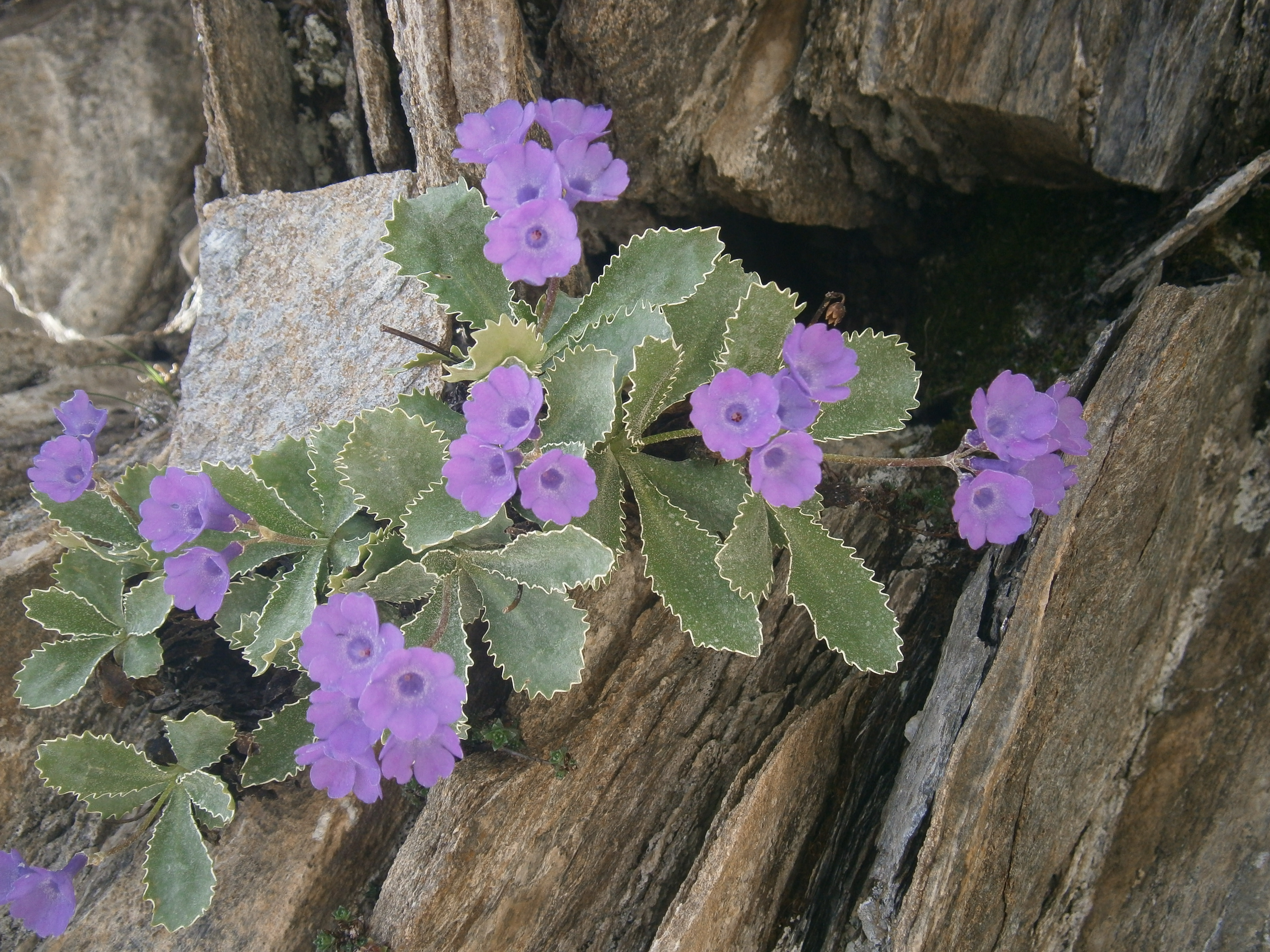

Scientific classification
- Kingdom: Plantae
- Clade: Tracheophytes
- Clade: Angiosperms
- Clade: Eudicots
- Clade: Asterids
- Order: Ericales
- Family: Primulaceae
- Genus: Primula
- Species: P. marginata

Binomial name
- Primula marginata Curtis

Synonyms
- Aretia crenata (Lam.) Link; Auricula crenata (Lam.) Spach; Auricula-ursi marginata (Curtis) Soják; Primula crenata Lam.; Primula microcalyx Lehm.; Primula rheiniana Ingw.

= Primula marginata =

Species of flowering plant

Primula marginata, the silver-edged primrose, is a species of flowering plant in the family Primulaceae, native to the south western Alps of France and Italy.

== Description ==
Primula marginata is an evergreen or semi-evergreen herbaceous perennial growing to 15 cm (5.9 in) tall by 30 cm (12 in) wide. The toothed, obovate to lancelet shaped leaves are leathery with mealy-white edges. Umbels with up to 20 slightly scented lavender or occasionally pink flowers with white mealy eye zones are produced in late spring to early summer. The mealy-white bloom of the leaves give rise to the common names.

== Cultivation ==
The earliest cultivation of this species dates to 1700s.

Numerous cultivars have been developed for garden use, of which the following have gained the Royal Horticultural Society's Award of Garden Merit:

- Primula marginata
- Primula marginata 'Beamish'
- Primula marginata 'Linda Pope'
- Primula marginata 'Prichard's Variety'
- Primula marginata 'Tony' ('Toni')
