= Primula alcalina =

Conservation status
- Imperiled (NatureServe)

Scientific classification
- Kingdom: Plantae
- Clade: Tracheophytes
- Clade: Angiosperms
- Clade: Eudicots
- Clade: Asterids
- Order: Ericales
- Family: Primulaceae
- Genus: Primula
- Species: P. alcalina

Binomial name
- Primula alcalina Cholewa & Douglass M.Hend

Species of flowering plant

Primula alcalina, the alkali or bluedome primrose, is a species of primrose found in central-east Idaho and Montana.

== Appearance and identification ==
=== Related species ===
Primula alcalina is closely related, and was once believed to be conspecific to, P. incana, the hoary primrose, but can be distinguished from that species by the size and color of its flowers (smaller and white, as opposed to pale purple), and by cellular-level differences, having a significantly lower chromosome number.

It is believed to be a sister taxon to Primula modesta of Japan.

=== Physical description ===
Primula alcalina has leaves measuring 1–4 cm in length with glabrous (hairless) surfaces. It roots are fibrous and its rhizomes are thin and relatively short. Its flowers grow on unbranched umbels at the top of a flower stem which can vary between 6.5 and 24 cm in height. There can be as many as 10 flowers, which grow on purplish-green pedicels.
