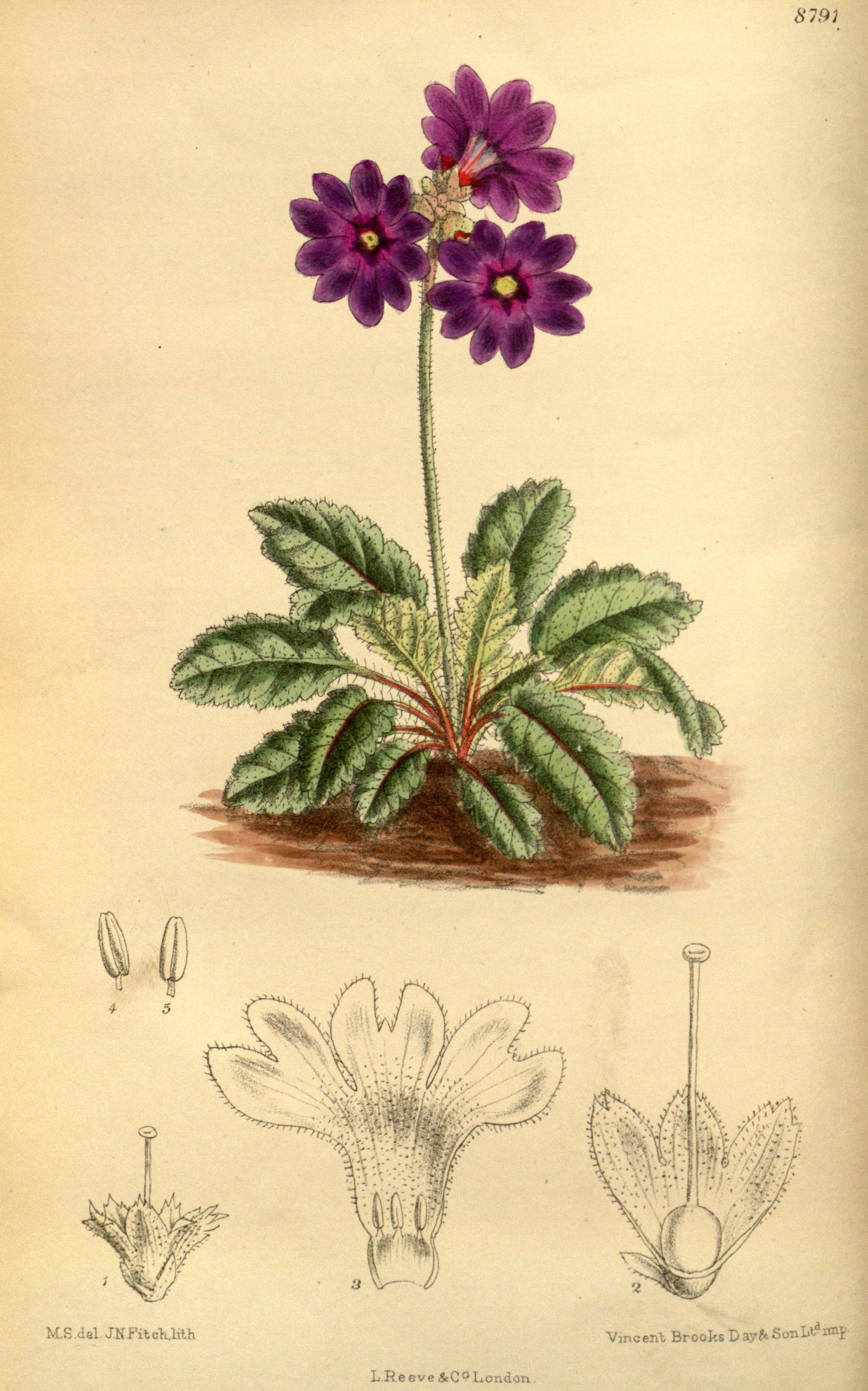

Conservation status
- Least Concern (IUCN 3.1)

Scientific classification
- Kingdom: Plantae
- Clade: Tracheophytes
- Clade: Angiosperms
- Clade: Eudicots
- Clade: Asterids
- Order: Ericales
- Family: Primulaceae
- Genus: Primula
- Species: P. chasmophila

Binomial name
- Primula chasmophila (Balf.f. ex Hutch.) Balf.f. ex Hutch.

= Primula chasmophila =

Species of flowering plant

Primula chasmophila is a species of flowering plant in the Primulaceae family. It is endemic to Bhutan.
