= Primula filipes =

Scientific classification
- Kingdom: Plantae
- Clade: Tracheophytes
- Clade: Angiosperms
- Clade: Eudicots
- Clade: Asterids
- Order: Ericales
- Family: Primulaceae
- Genus: Primula
- Species: P. filipes

Binomial name
- Primula filipes G.Watt

Synonyms
- Androsace cordifolia Wall.; Auganthus forbesii (Franch.) Soják; Primula androsacea Pax; Primula barbeyana Petitm.; Primula forbesii Franch.; Primula multicaulis Petitm.; Primula wallichiana Kuntze; Primula willmottiae Petitm.

Species of flowering plant

Primula filipes is a species of flowering plant within the genus Primula and family Primulaceae.

== Description ==
Primula filipes is an annual species. Plants possess a basal rosette of leaves, which range in length from 2 – 5cm long. Leaves are green, long, toothed and spoon shaped. Leaf blades can be orbicular to ovate or cordate. Stems can range from 10 – 30cm tall and can host up to eight flowers. Flowers are bell shaped and pale pink in colour.

== Distribution ==
Primula filipes is native to the continent of Asia, where it can be found in: South-Central China (South-West Sichuan, North-East and Central Yunnan), the Eastern Himalayas, Myanmar, Nepal and Assam.

== Habitat ==
Primula filipes is an adaptable species that can grow in a variety of habitats. P. filipes can be found in temperate deciduous woodlands where it grows in shade. It will also grow in marshes near to canals and rice fields. It is also been found growing in alpine habitat such as in rocky cliffs and mountain slopes. The species is also sometimes cultivated inside of temple and village gardens within its natural range. Plants can be found at elevations ranging from 2000–2700 metres above sea level.
