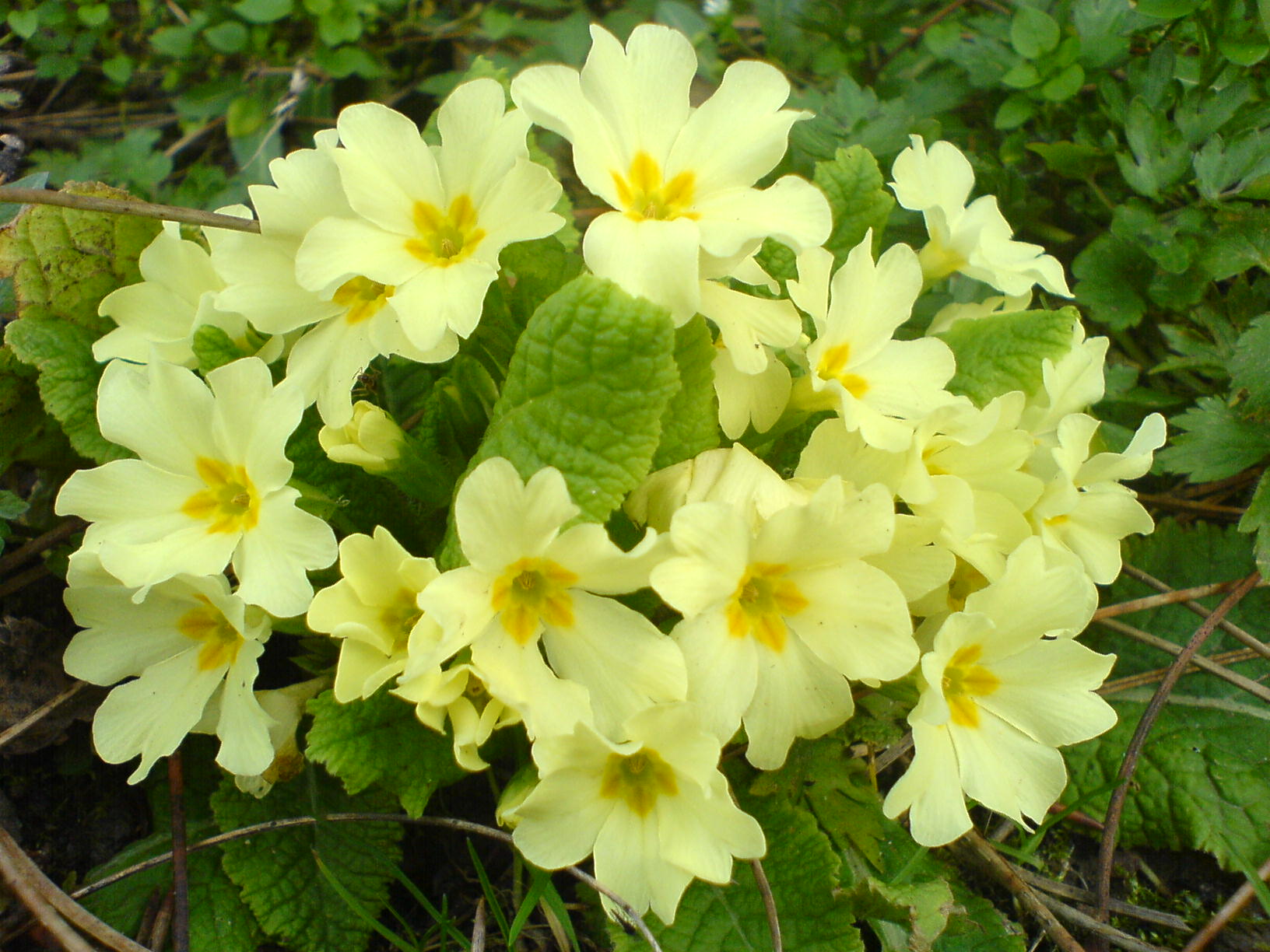
- Primula vulgaris

Scientific classification
- Kingdom: Plantae
- Clade: Embryophytes
- Clade: Tracheophytes
- Clade: Angiosperms
- Clade: Eudicots
- Clade: Asterids
- Order: Ericales
- Family: Primulaceae
- Subfamily: Primuloideae
- Genus: Primula; L. (1753)

Type species
- Primula veris L.

Species
- 528; see text

Synonyms
- Aleuritia (Duby) Opiz; Aretia Link; Auganthus Link; Auricula Hill; Auricula-ursi Ség.; Cankrienia de Vriese; Carolinella Hemsl.; × Cortoprimula Zeman; Cortusa L.; Dodecatheon L.; Evotrochis Raf.; Exinia Raf.; Kablikia Opiz; Meadia Mill.; Oscaria Lilja; Paralysis Hill; Primulidium Spach; Sredinskya (Stein) Fed.

= Primula =

Genus of flowering plants

Primula (/ˈprɪmjʊlə/) is a genus of herbaceous flowering plants in the family Primulaceae. They include the primrose (P. vulgaris), a familiar wildflower of banks and verges. Other common species are P. auricula (auricula), P. veris (cowslip), and P. elatior (oxlip). These species and many others are valued for their ornamental flowers. They have been extensively cultivated and hybridised (in the case of the primrose, for many hundreds of years). Primula are native to the temperate Northern Hemisphere, south into tropical mountains in Ethiopia, Indonesia, and New Guinea, and in temperate southern South America. Almost half of the known species are from the Himalayas.

Primula has over 500 species in traditional treatments, and more if certain related genera are included within its circumscription.

== Description ==
Primula is a complex and varied genus, with a range of habitats from alpine slopes to boggy meadows. Plants bloom mostly during the spring, with flowers often appearing in spherical umbels on stout stems arising from basal rosettes of leaves; their flowers can be purple, yellow, red, pink, blue, or white. Some species show a white mealy bloom (farina) on various parts of the plant. Many species are adapted to alpine climates.

== Taxonomy ==
Primula was known at least as early as the mediaeval herbalists, although first formally described as a genus by Linnaeus in 1753, and later in 1754 in his Flora Anglica. Linnaeus described seven species of Primula. One of its earliest scientific treatments was that of Charles Darwin study of heterostyly in 1877 (The different forms of flowers on plants of the same species). Since then, heterostyly (and homostyly) have remained important considerations in the taxonomic classification of Primula. Primula is a member of the Primulaceae family. The most complete treatment of the family, with nearly 1000 species arranged into 22 genera, was by Pax and Knuth in 1905.

=== Phylogeny ===
Primula is the largest genus in the family Primulaceae, within which it is placed in the subfamily Primuloideae, being the nominative genus.

The position of Primula within the family and its relationship to other genera is shown in this cladogram:

- Primulaceae s.l.
  - Maesoideae
    Maesa
  - Theophrastaceae
    - Clavija
    - Samolus
  - Primulaceae
    - Primula
    - Myrsinaceae
      - Lysimachia
      - Myrsine

==== Classification ====
The genus Dodecatheon originated from within Primula, its species are now included in Primula.

===== Sections of genus Primula =====
The classification of the genus Primula has been investigated by botanists for over a century. As the genus is both large and diverse (with about 430–500 species), botanists have organized the species in various sub-generic groups. The most common is division into a series of thirty sections. Some of these sections (e.g. Vernales, Auricula) contain many species; others contain only one.

- Amethystina
- Auricula
- Bullatae
- Candelabra
- Capitatae
- Carolinella
- Cortusoides
- Cuneifolia
- Denticulata
- Dryadifolia
- Farinosae
- Floribundae
- Grandis
- Malacoidea
- Malvacea
- Minutissimae
- Muscaroides
- Nivales
- Obconica
- Parryi
- Petiolares
- Pinnatae
- Pycnoloba
- Reinii
- Rotundifolia
- Sikkimensis
- Sinenses
- Soldanelloideae
- Souliei
- Vernales

=== Selected species ===
Species include:

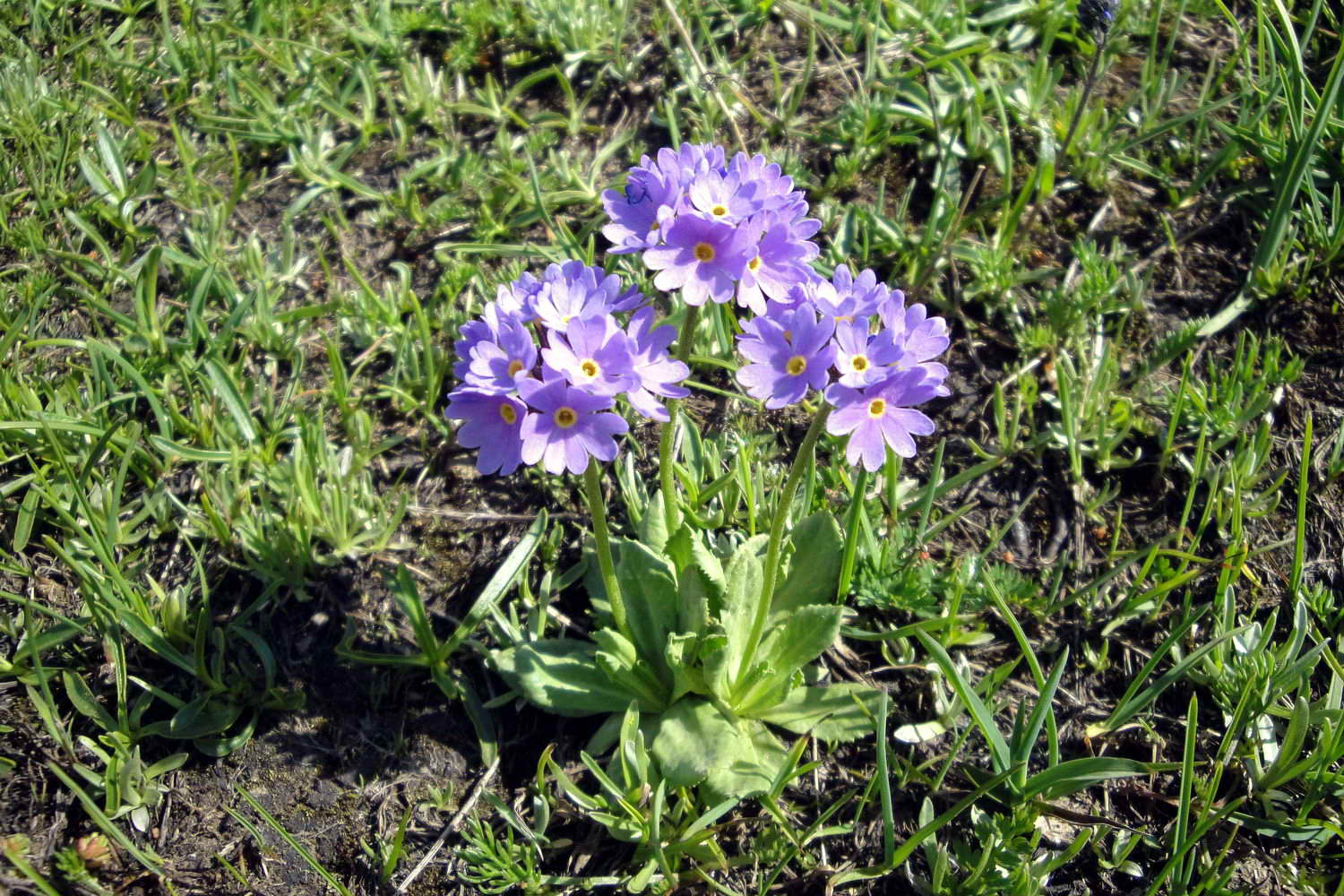
Primula algida

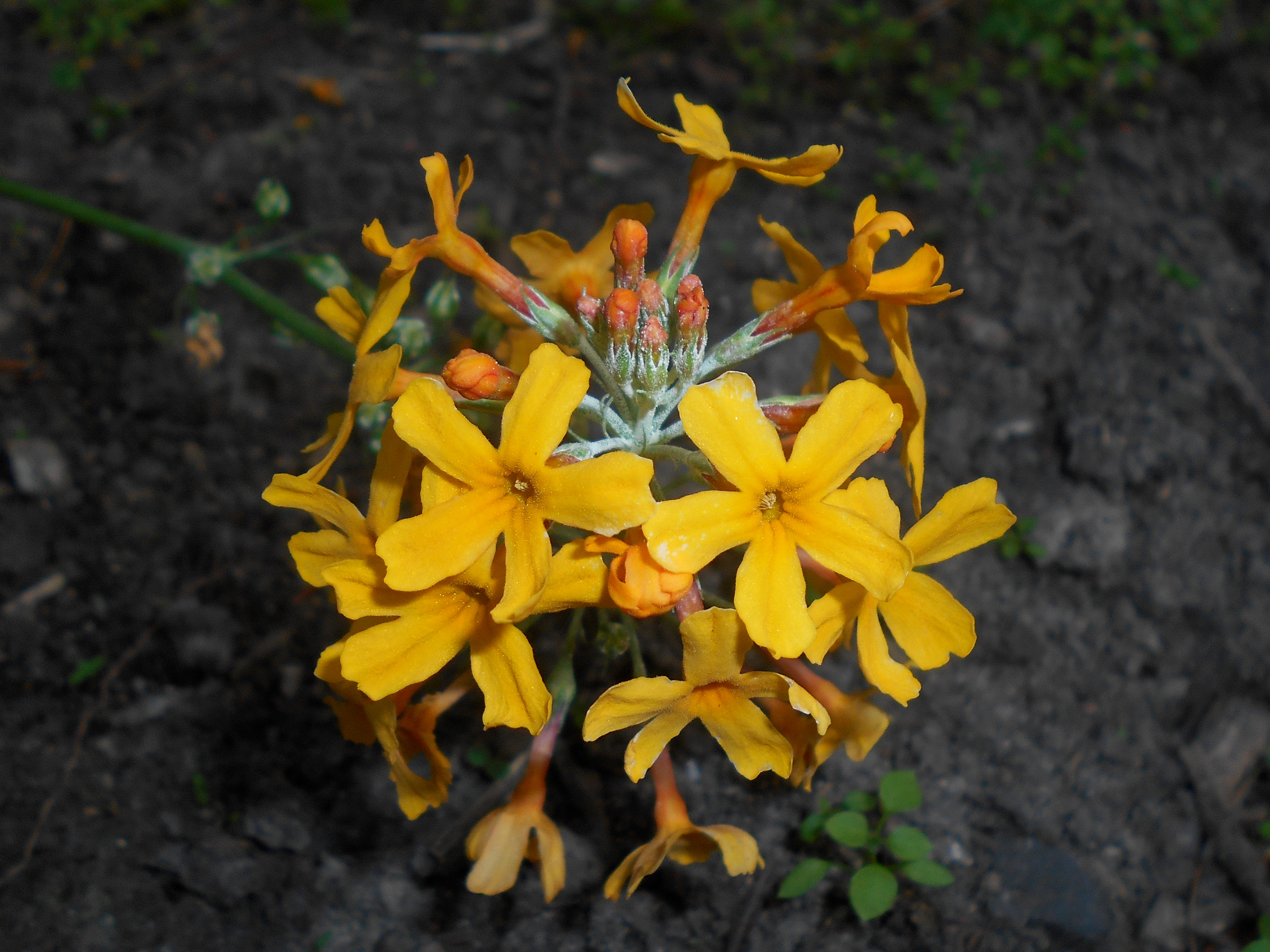
Primula auriantaca

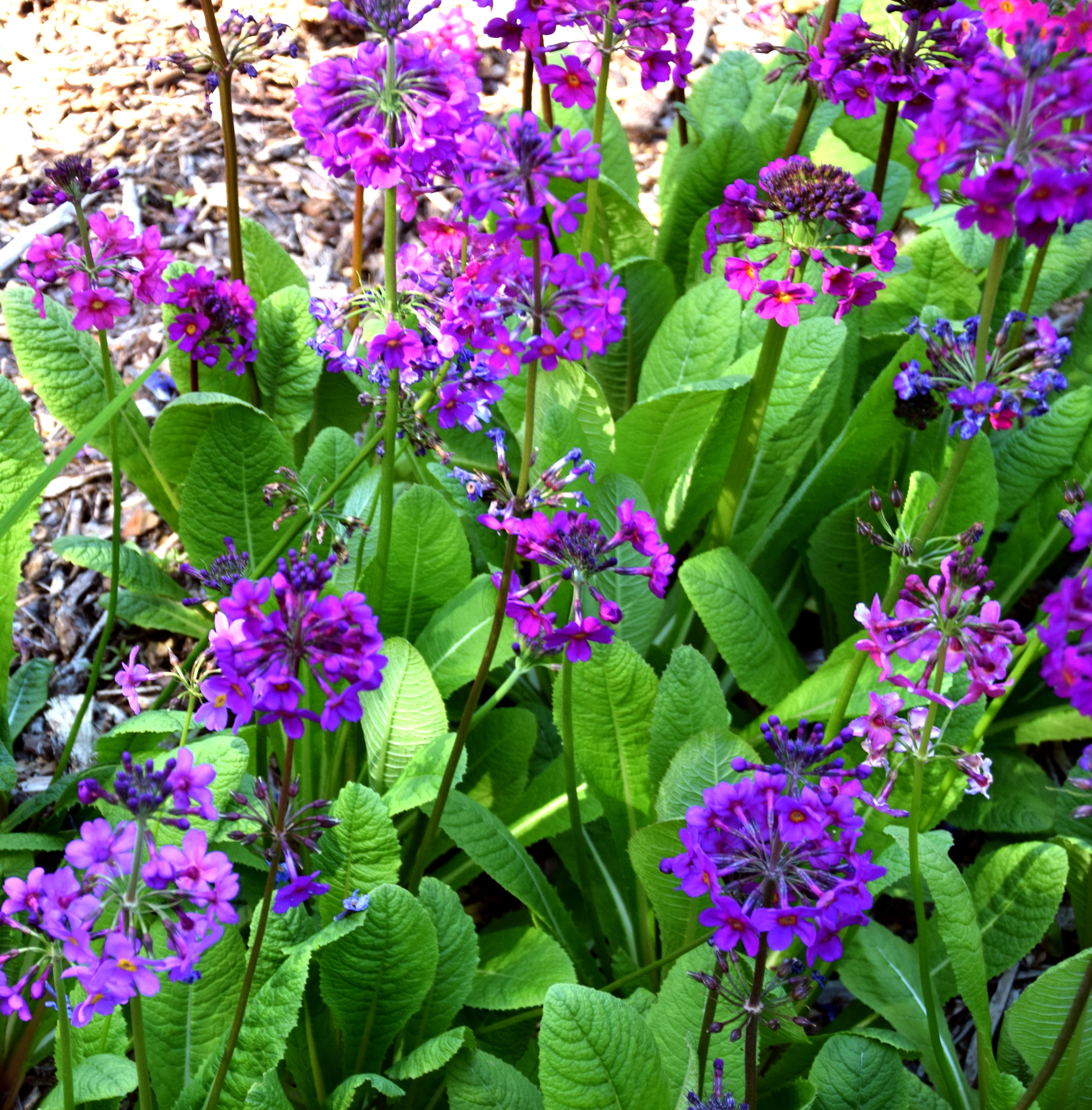
Primula beesiana

- Primula alcalina (bluedome primrose)
- Primula algida
- Primula aliciae
- Primula allionii (Allioni's primrose)
- Primula alpicola (moonlight primrose)
- Primula amethystina
- Primula angustifolia (alpine primrose)
- Primula anisodora (anise primrose)
- Primula anvilensis (boreal primrose)
- Primula appenina
- Primula arunachalensis
- Primula atrodentata
- Primula aurantiaca (primevère à fleurs oranges)
- Primula aureata
- Primula auricula (auricula, bear's ear)
- Primula auriculata
- Primula bathangensis
- Primula beesiana (candelabra primrose)
- Primula bella
- Primula bellidifolia
- Primula bergenioides
- Primula bhutanica
- Primula blattariformis
- Primula boothii
- Primula borealis (northern primrose)
- Primula bracteosa
- Primula bulleyana (candelabra primrose)

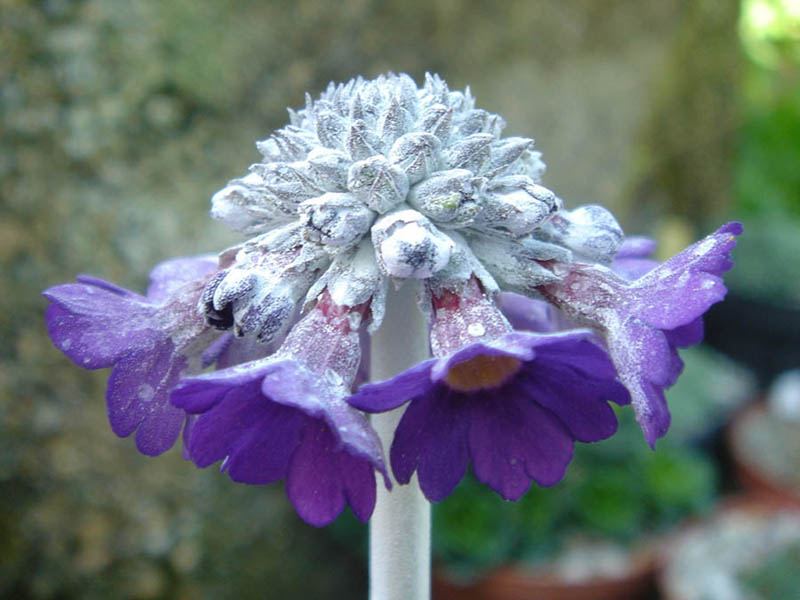
Primula capitata ssp. mooreana

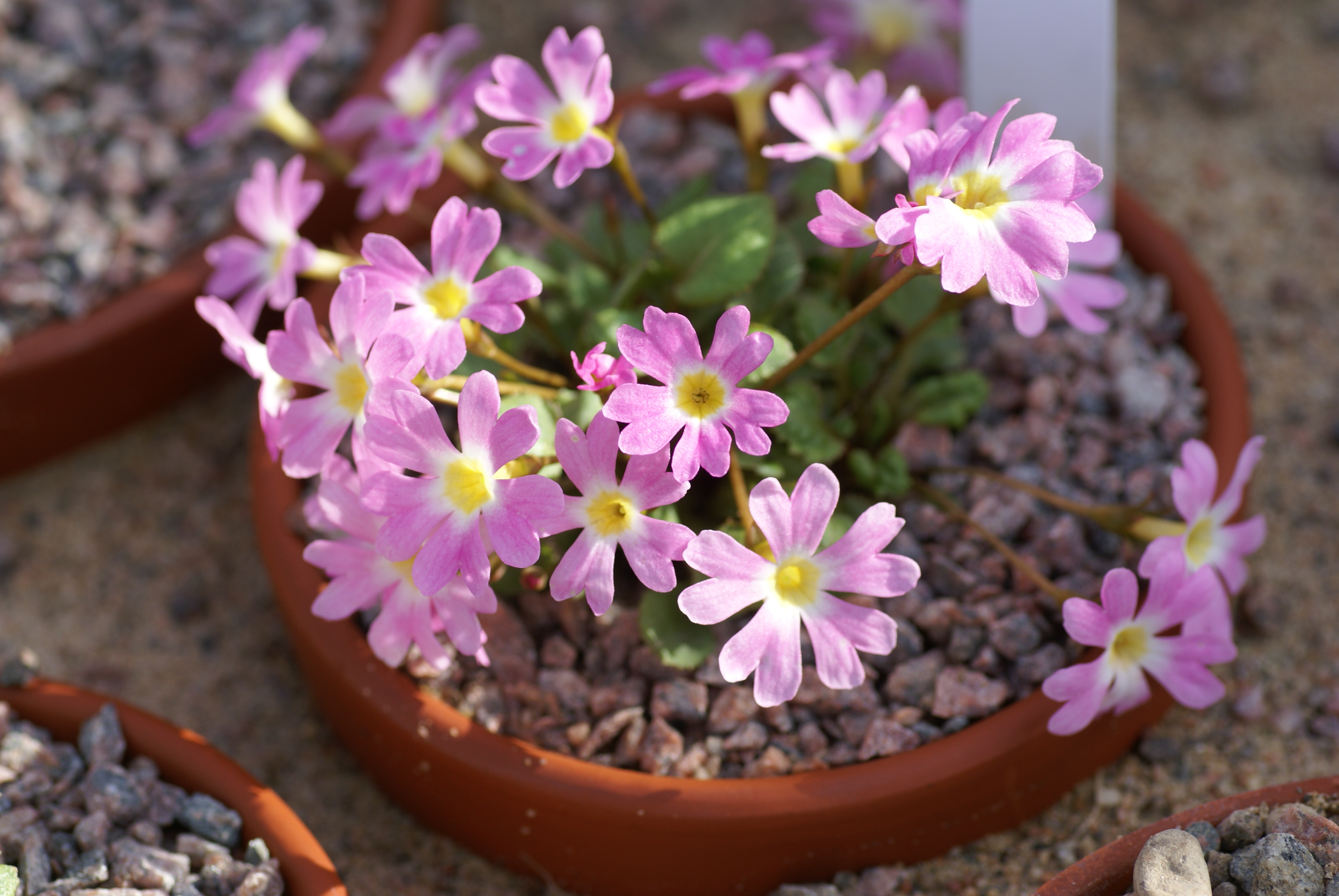
Primula clarkei

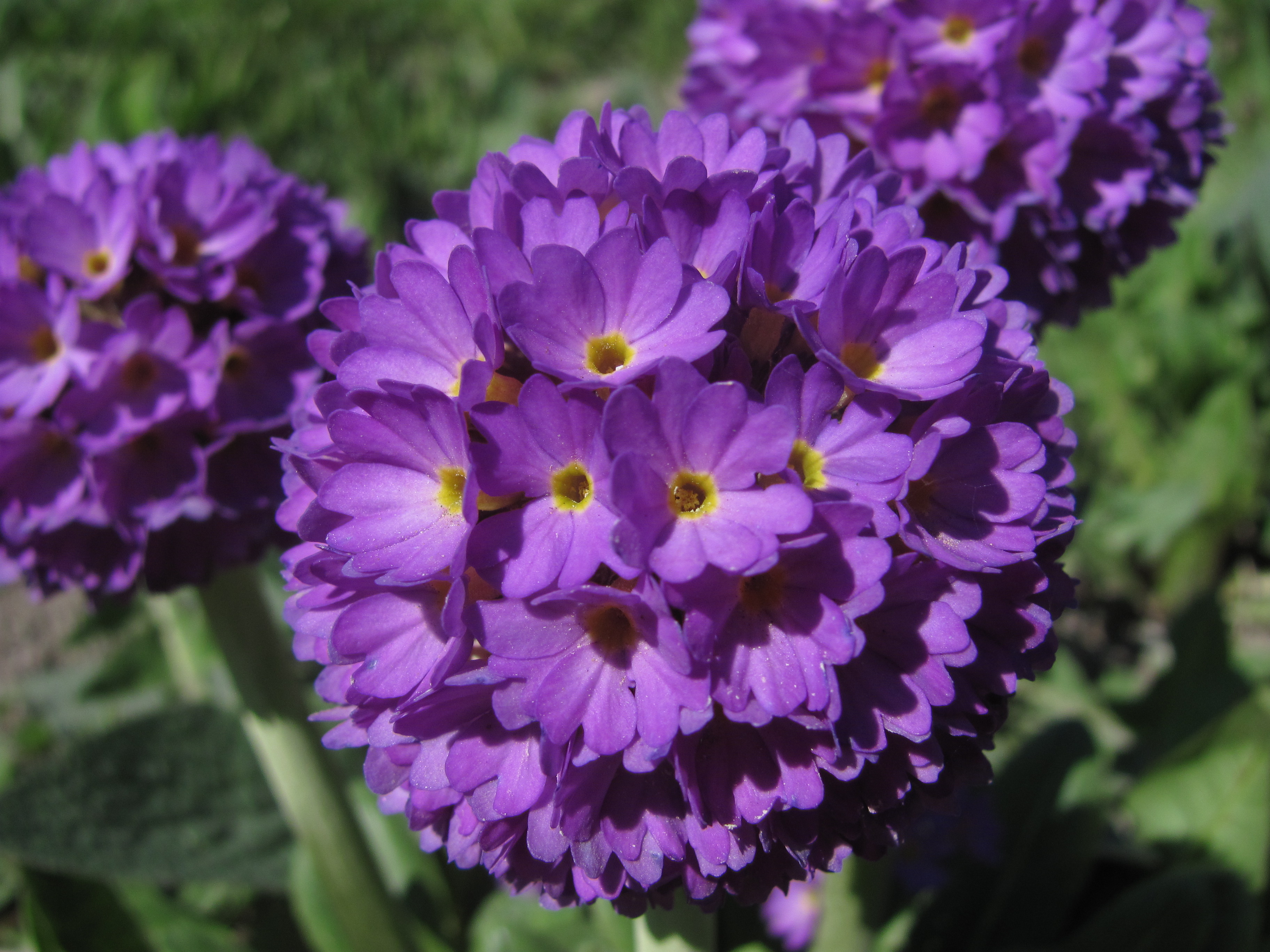
Primula denticulata

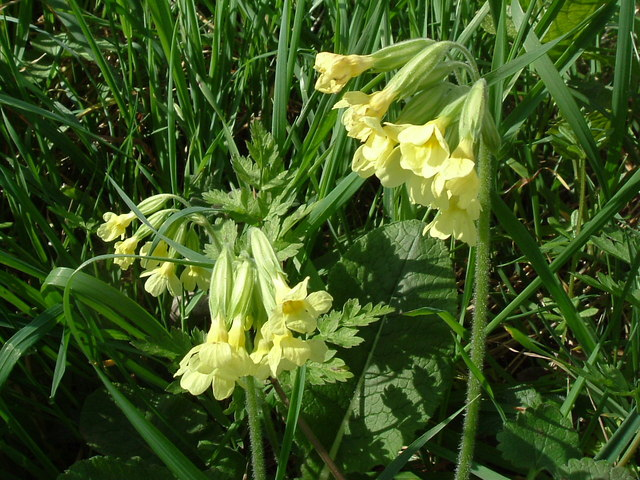
Primula elatior (oxlip)

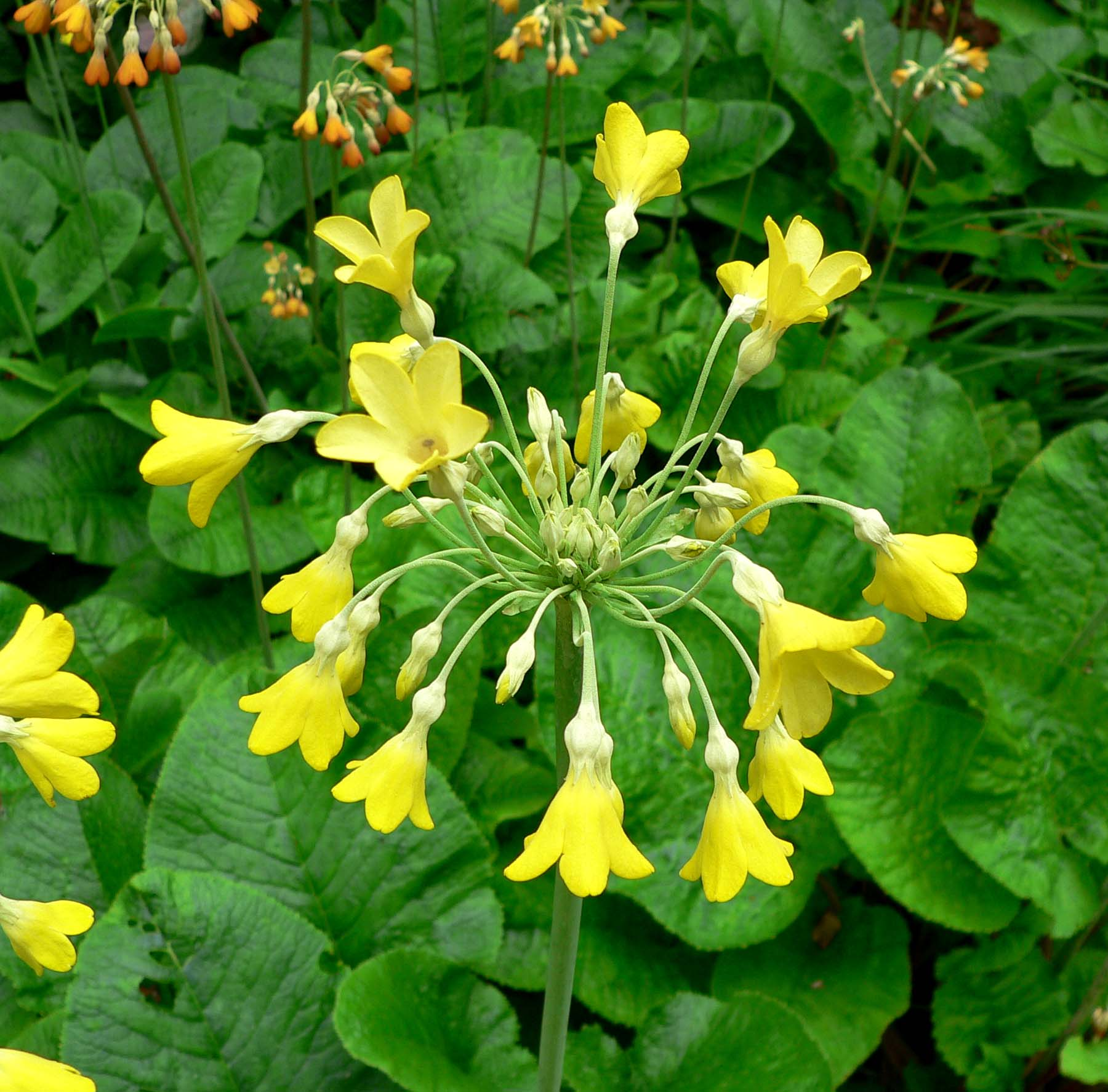
Primula florindae

- Primula calderiana
- Primula calliantha
- Primula calyptrata
- Primula capillaris (Ruby Mountain primrose)
- Primula capitata
  - Primula capitata ssp. mooreana
  - Primula capitata ssp. crispata
- Primula capitellata
- Primula carniolica (Carniolan primrose)
- Primula caveana
- Primula cawdoriana
- Primula cernua
- Primula chionantha
- Primula chumbiensis
- Primula chungensis
- Primula chasmophila
- Primula clarkei
- Primula clusiana
- Primula clutterbuckii
- Primula cockburniana
- Primula concholoba
- Primula concinna
- Primula conspersa
- Primula cortusoides
- Primula cuneifolia (wedgeleaf primrose, pixie-eye primrose)
- Primula cusickiana (Cusick's primrose)
- Primula daonensis
- Primula darialica
- Primula davidii
- Primula deflexa
- Primula denticulata (drumstick primrose, Himalayan primrose)
- Primula deorum (Rila primrose, Rila cowslip, God's cowslip)
- Primula deuteronana
- Primula dryadifolia
- Primula edgeworthii
- Primula egaliksensis (Greenland primrose)
- Primula elatior (oxlip, true oxlip, oxslip)
- Primula elizabethiae
- Primula elongata
- Primula erythrocarpa
- Primula farinosa (birdseye primrose)
- Primula farreriana
- Primula fedschenkoi
- Primula fenghwaiana
- Primula filchnerae
- Primula filipes
- Primula firmipes
- Primula fistulosa
- Primula flaccida
- Primula floribunda
- Primula florindae (Himalayan cowslip, Tibetan cowslip)
- Primula forrestii
- Primula frondosa

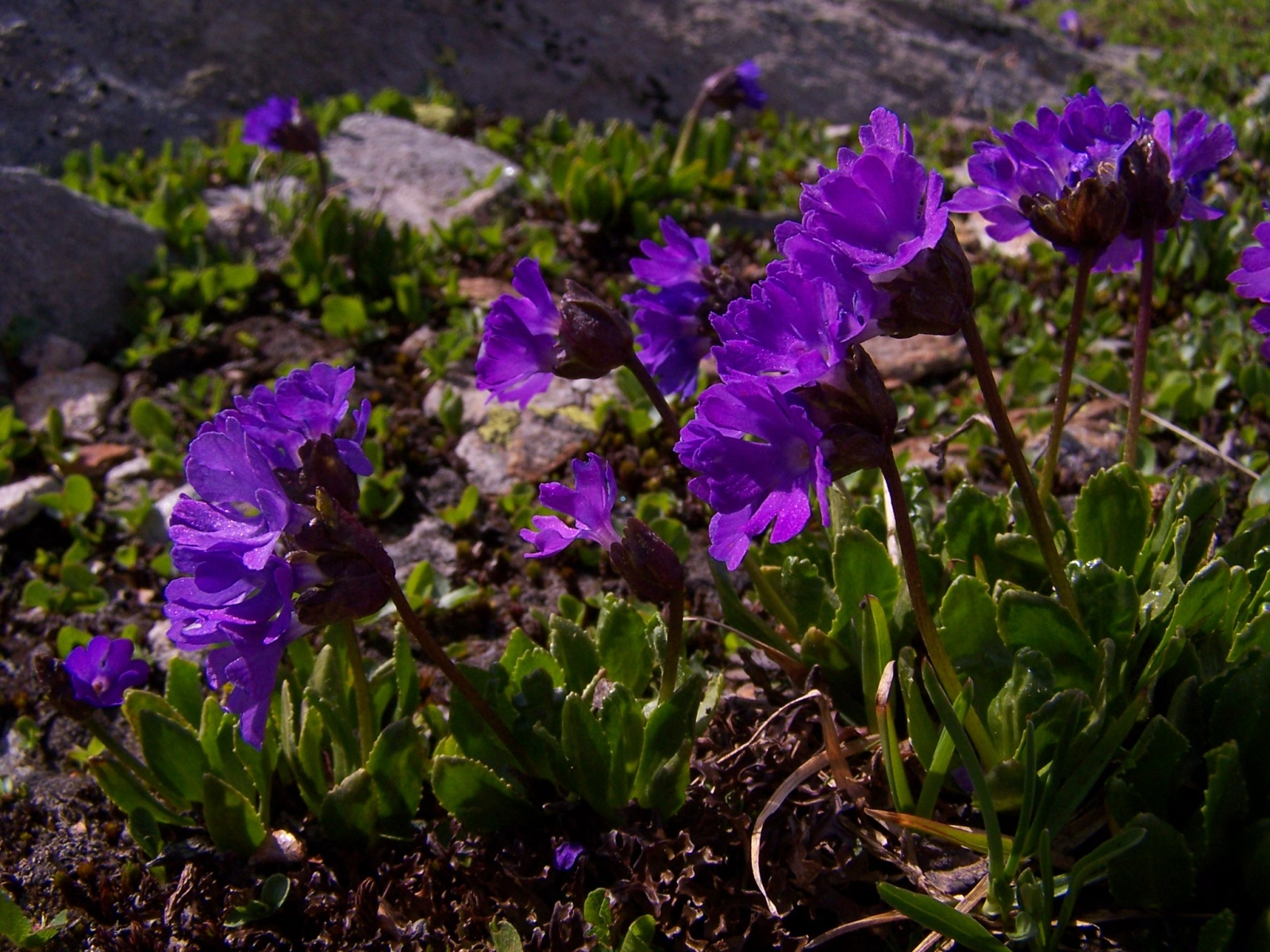
Primula glutinosa

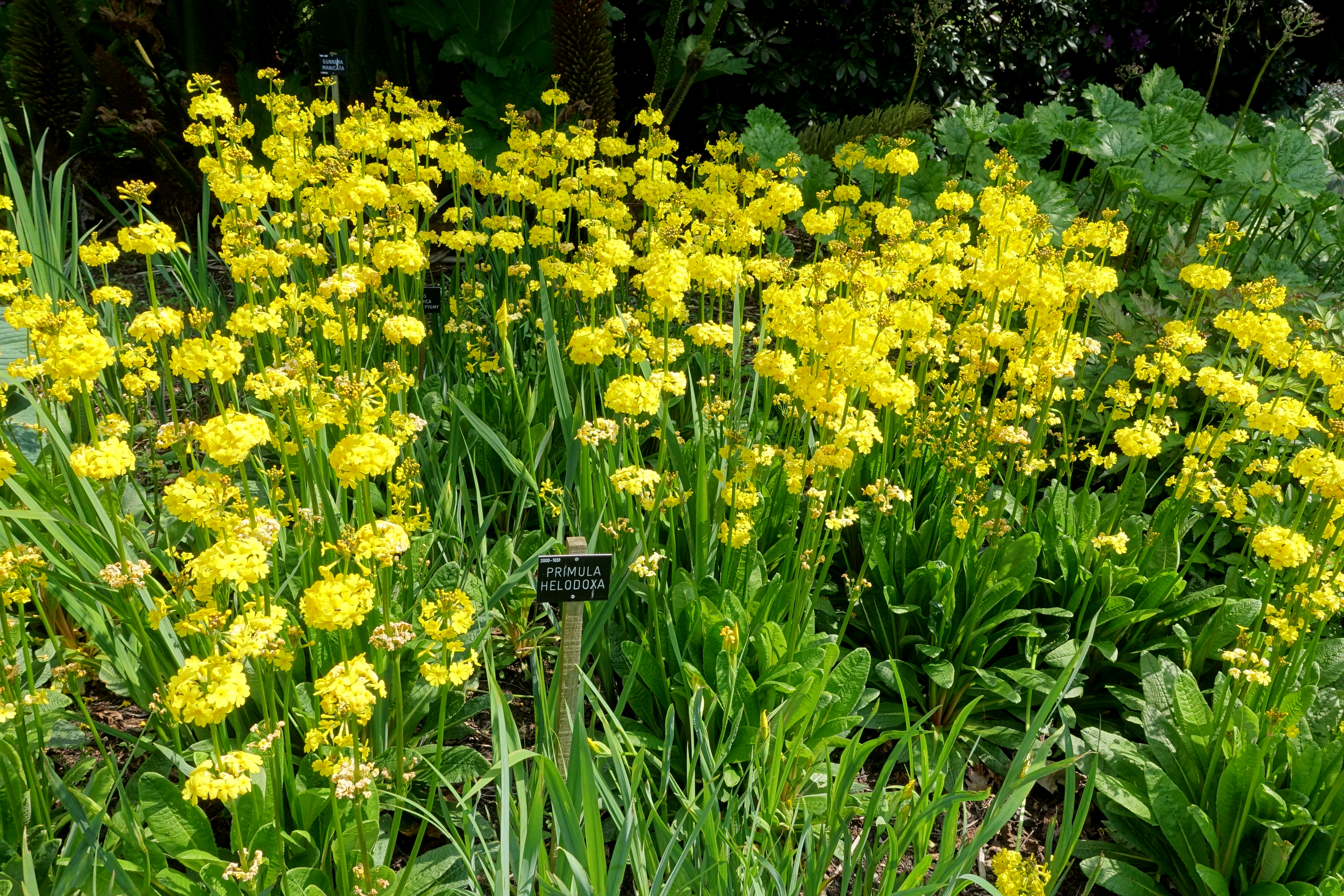
Primula helodoxa

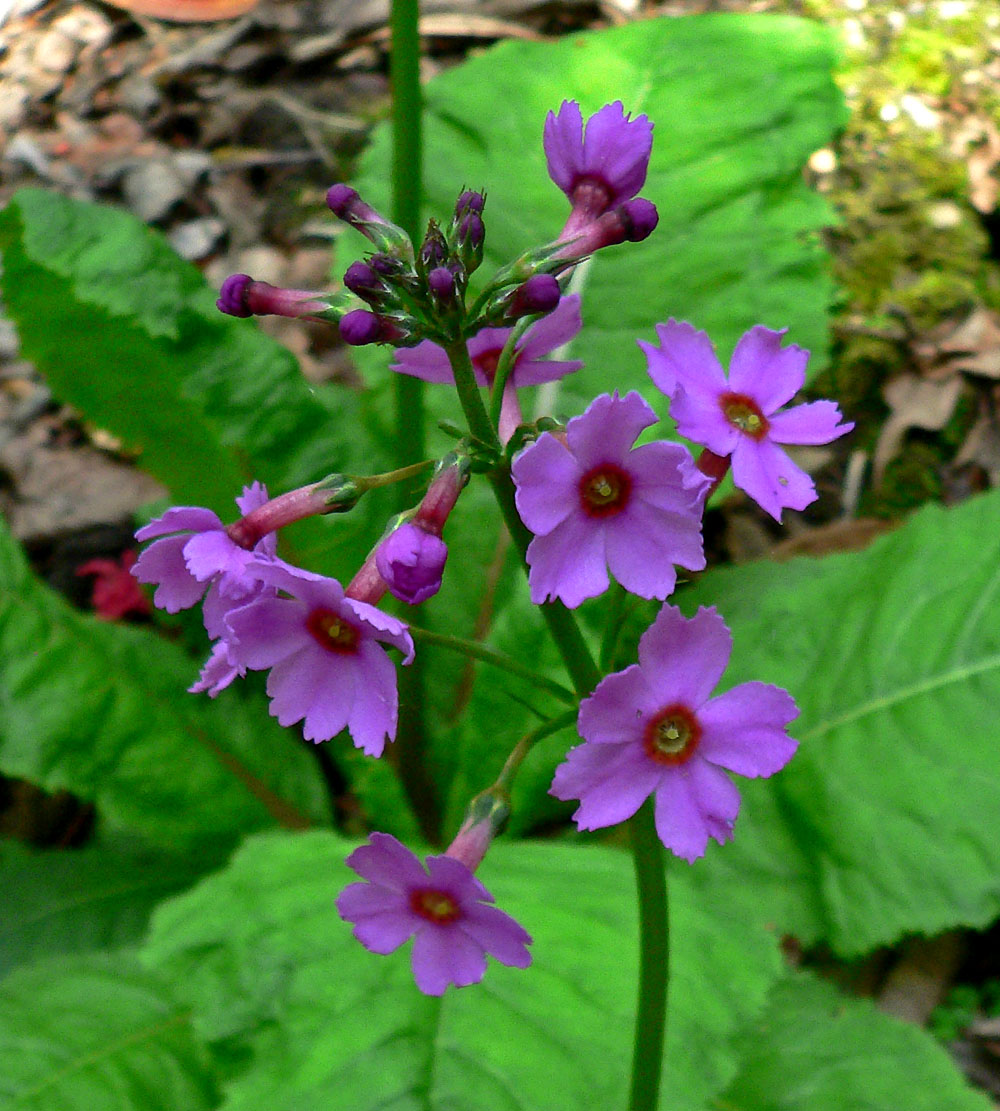
Primula japonica

- Primula gambeliana
- Primula gemmifera
- Primula geraniifolia
- Primula giraldiana
- Primula glabra
- Primula glaucescens
- Primula glomerata
- Primula glutinosa
- Primula gracilenta
- Primula gracillipes
- Primula griffithii
- Primula halleri (long-flowered primrose, Haller's primrose)
- Primula helodoxa
- Primula hendersonii (broad-leaved shootingstar, Henderson's shootingstar, mosquito-bill, sailor caps)
- Primula heucherifolia
- Primula hirsuta (hairy primrose)
- Primula hookeri
- Primula incana (silvery primrose, mealy primrose)
- Primula interjacens
- Primula involucrata
- Primula ioessa
- Primula irregularis
- Primula japonica (Japanese primrose, Japanese cowslip)
- Primula jesoana
- Primula jigmediana
- Primula juliae (Julia's primrose, purple primrose)
- Primula kingii
- Primula kisoana
- Primula kitaibeliana (Kitaibel's primrose)
- Primula klattii
- Primula laurentiana (birdseye primrose)
- Primula lihengiana

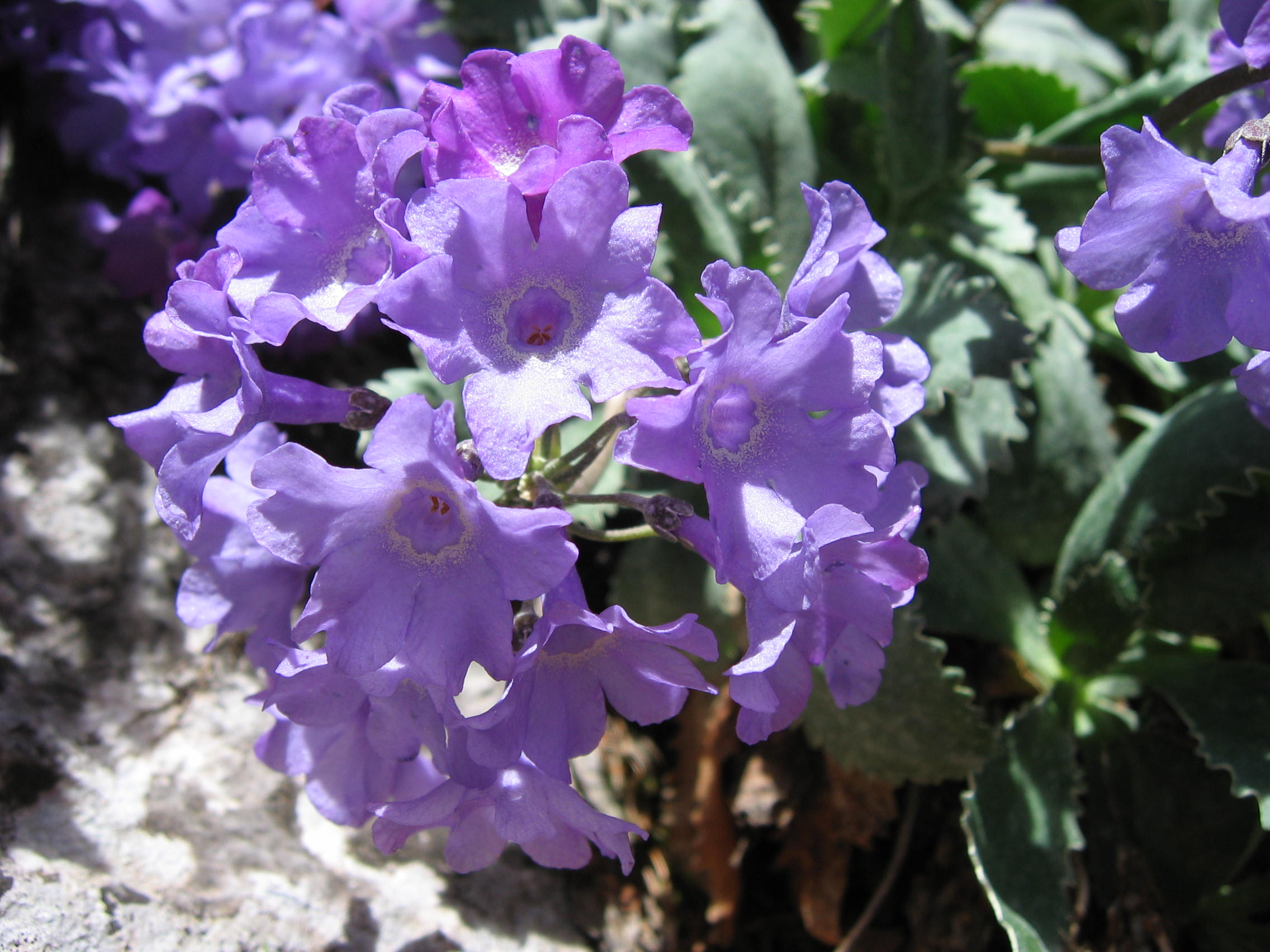
Primula marginata

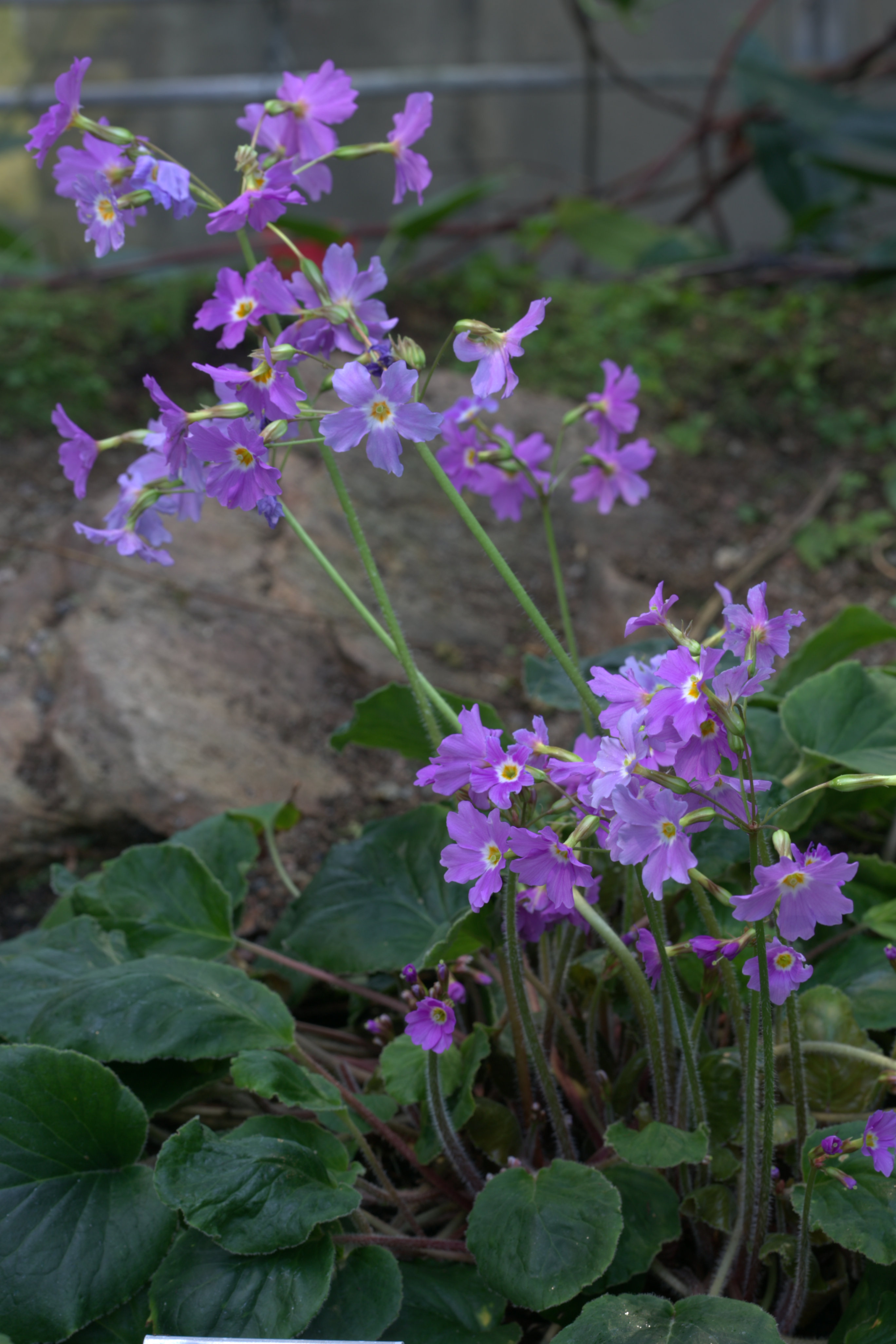
Primula megaseifolia

- Primula listeri
- Primula longiscapa
- Primula lutea
- Primula luteola
- Primula macrophylla (largeleaf primrose)
- Primula magellanica
- Primula malacoides (fairy primrose, baby primrose)
- Primula malvacea
- Primula marginata (marginate primrose)
- Primula megaseifolia
- Primula melanantha
- Primula melanops
- Primula minima (dwarf primrose)
- Primula minor
- Primula mistassinica (Mistassini primrose)
- Primula modesta
- Primula mollis
- Primula moupinensis

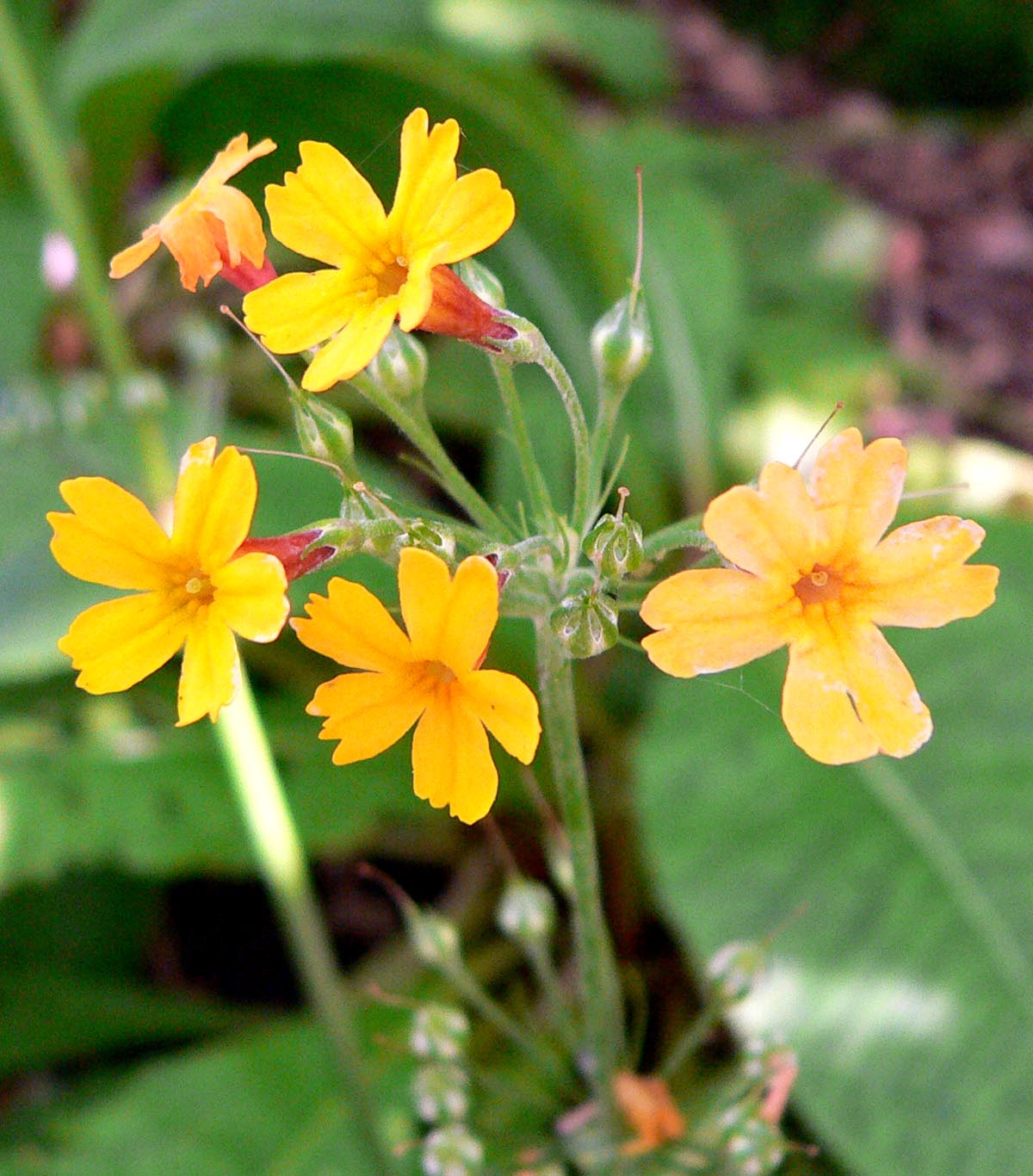
Primula prolifera

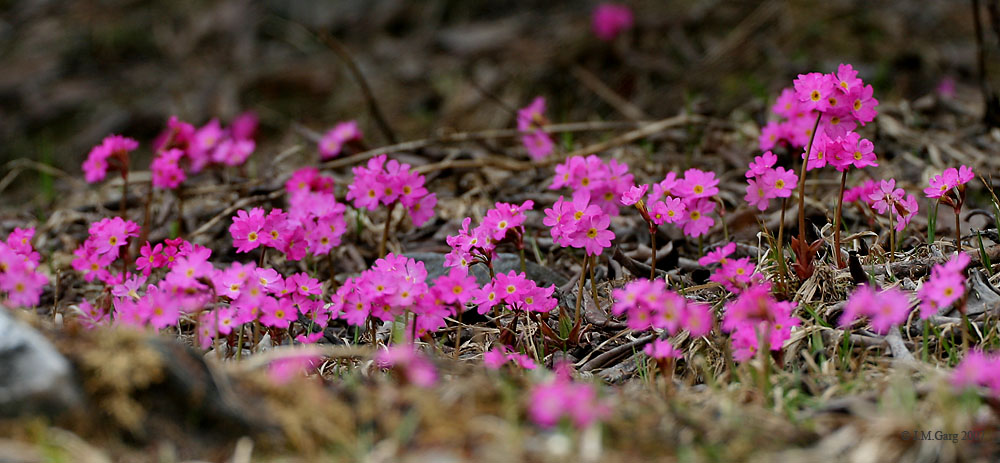
Primula rosea

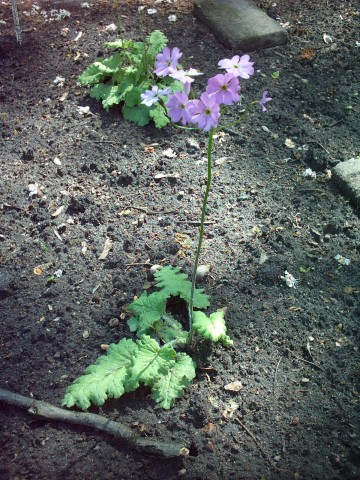
Primula sieboldii

- Primula munroi
- Primula muscarioides
- Primula nipponica
- Primula nivalis (snowy primrose)
- Primula obconica (poison primrose, German primrose)
- Primula orbicularis

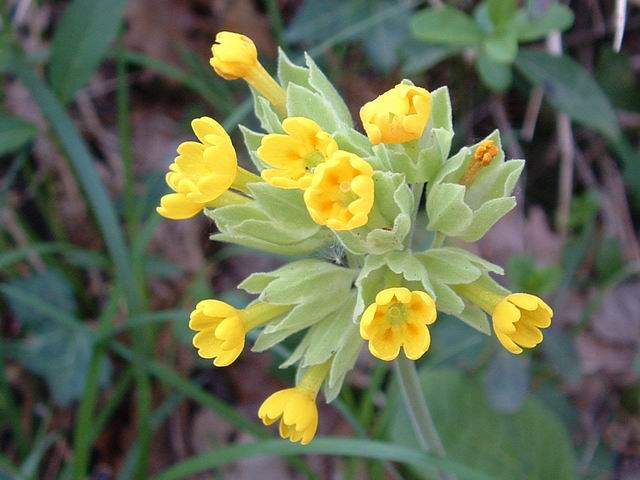
Primula veris

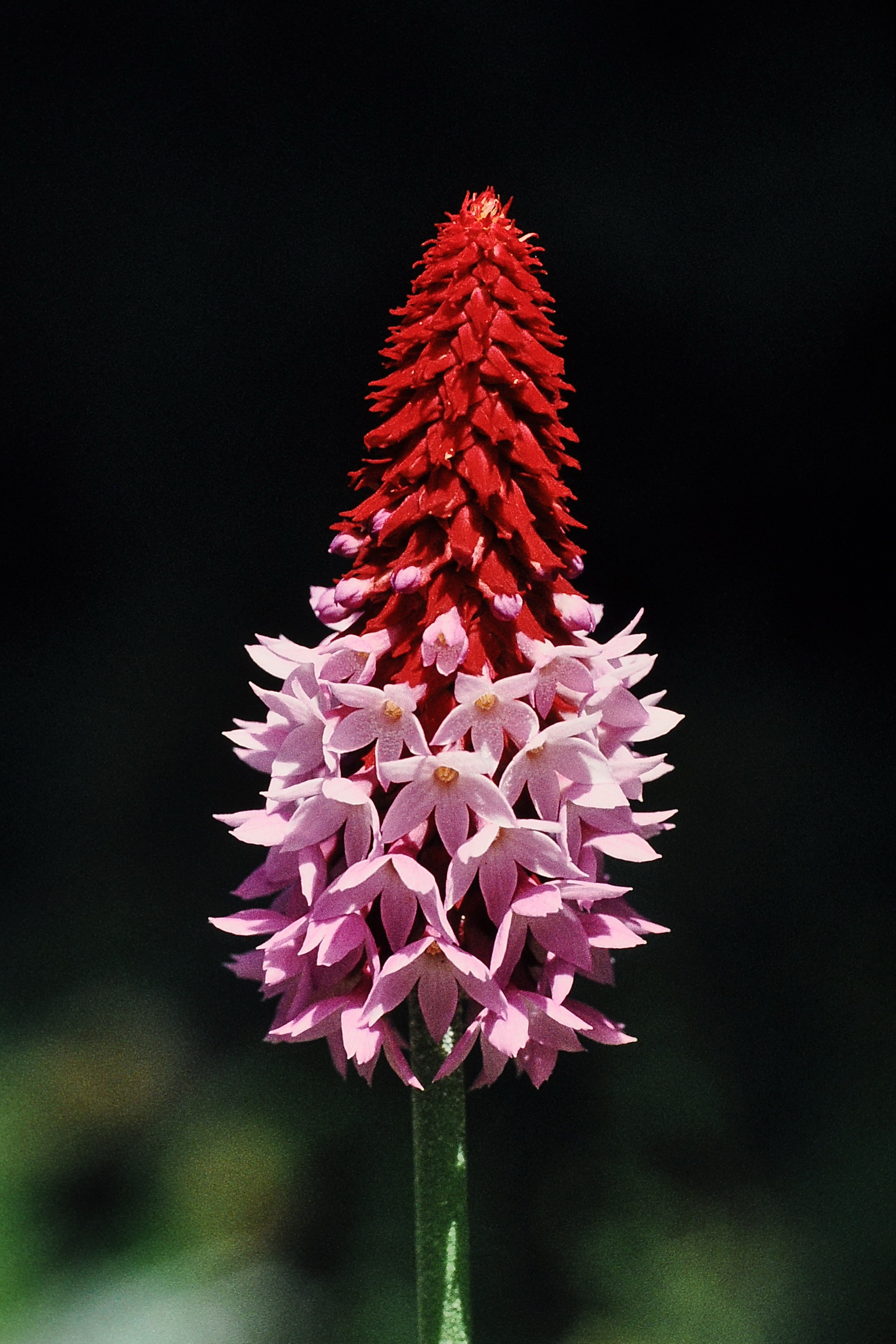
Primula vialii

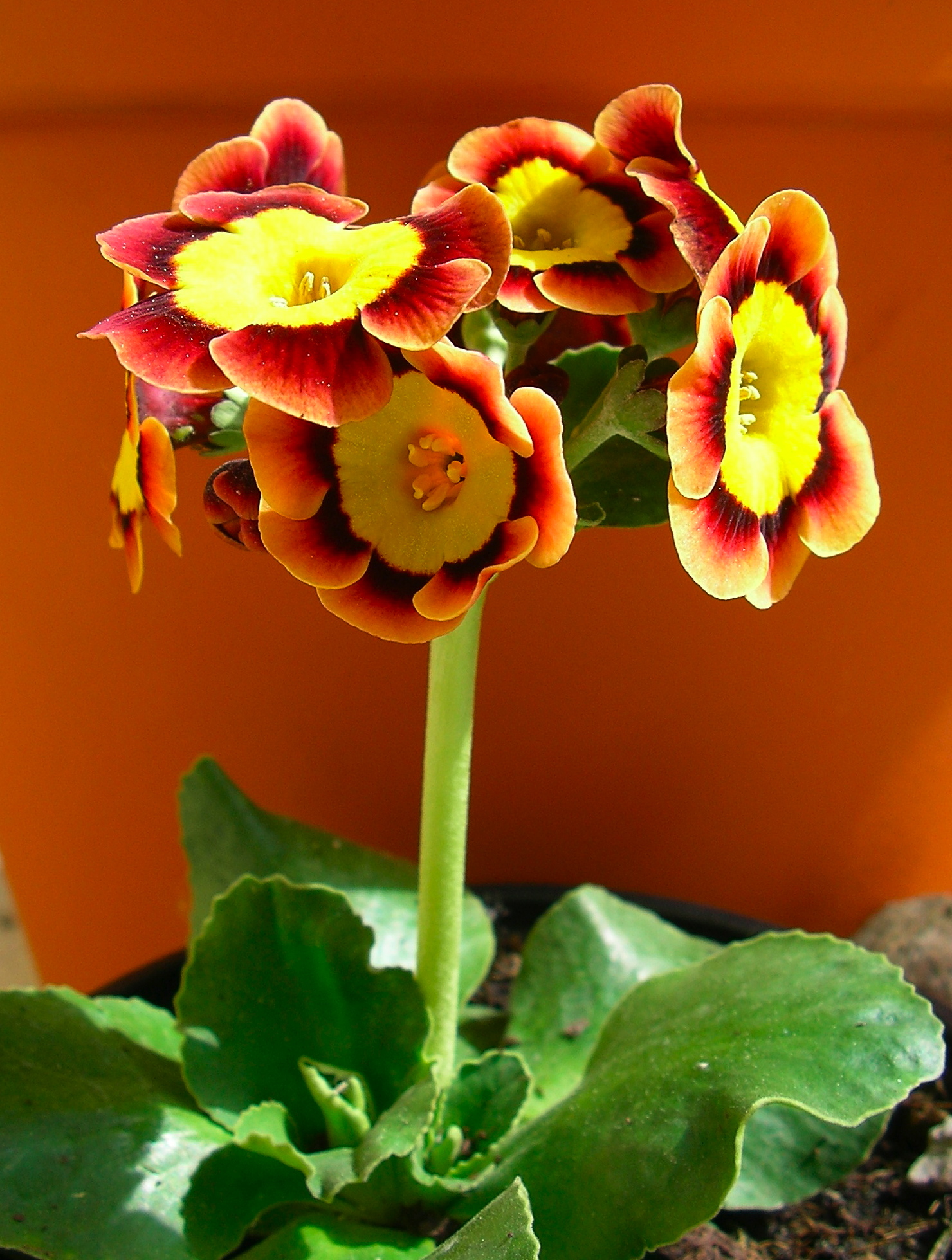
Primula × pubescens

- Primula palinuri
- Primula parryi (Parry's primrose)
- Primula pedemontana
- Primula petelotii
- Primula petiolaris
- Primula pinnatifida
- Primula poissonii
- Primula polyneura
- Primula prenantha
- Primula prolifera (glory-of-the-marsh)
- Primula pulchella
- Primula pulverulenta (mealy cowslip)
- Primula pumila (arctic primrose)
- Primula reidii
- Primula reinii
- Primula renifolia
- Primula reptans
- Primula reticulata
- Primula rockii
- Primula rosea (Himalayan meadow primrose)
- Primula rotundifolia
- Primula rusbyi (Rusby's primrose)
- Primula sapphirina
- Primula saxatilis (rock primrose)
- Primula scandinavica (Scandinavian primrose)
- Primula scapigera
- Primula scotica (Scottish primrose)
- Primula secundiflora
- Primula septemloba
- Primula serratifolia
- Primula sheriffii
- Primula sieboldii (Japanese primrose)
- Primula sikkimensis (Sikkim cowslip)
- Primula sinensis (syn. P. praenitens)
- Primula sinolisteri
- Primula sinomollis
- Primula soldanelloides
- Primula sonchifolia
- Primula souliei
- Primula specuicola (alcove primrose, cave-dwelling primrose)
- Primula stricta (coastal primrose, strict primrose)
- Primula strumosa
- Primula suffrutescens (Sierra primrose)
- Primula szechuanica
- Primula takedana
- Primula tanneri
- Primula tardiflora
- Primula tenella
- Primula tenuiloba
- Primula tenuituba
- Primula tibetica
- Primula tschuktschorum (Chukchi primrose)
- Primula tyrolensis
- Primula vaginata
- Primula valentiniana
- Primula veris (cowslip)
- Primula verticillata (yellow primrose)
- Primula vialii (wayside primrose, pagoda primrose, orchid primrose, poker primrose)
- Primula villosa
- Primula vulgaris (primrose)
- Primula waltonii
- Primula watsonii
- Primula warshenewskiana
- Primula whitei
- Primula wilsonii
- Primula wollastonii (Wollaston's primrose)
- Primula wulfeniana (Wulfen's primrose)
- Primula xanthopa
- Primula yunnanensis
- Primula yuparensis

=== Etymology ===
The word primula is the Latin feminine diminutive of primus, meaning first (prime), applied to flowers that are among the first to open in spring.

== Distribution and habitat ==
Although there are over 400 species of Primula, about 75% are found in the eastern Himalayan mountain chain and western China (Yunnan), constituting a centre of diversity. Other centres of diversity are a western Asian centre (Caucasus, European mountain ranges from the Pyrenees, through the Alps to the Carpathian Mountains), mountains of East Asia and those of western North America. Primula is found in mountainous or higher latitude zones of North America, Europe, and Asia, with extension into South America, Africa (mountains of Ethiopia) and tropical Asia (islands of Java and Sumatra). About 25 species occur in North America (represented in five sections).

Primula is found in the humid and moderate climate regions of the Northern Hemisphere, predominantly in the forest belt, plain meadows, Alpine lawns, and nival and meadow tundras.

== Ecology ==
Primulas are used as a food plant by the Duke of Burgundy butterfly.

== Cultivation ==
Primula species have been extensively cultivated and hybridised, mainly derived from P. elatior, P. juliae, P. veris and P. vulgaris. Polyanthus (Primula × polyantha) is one such group of plants, which has produced a large variety of strains in all colours, usually grown as annuals or biennials and available as seeds or young plants.

Another huge range of cultivars, known as auriculas, are derived from crosses between P. auricula and P. hirsuta (among others). Specialist nurseries and auricula societies support the growing and showing of these choice strains.

=== AGM cultivars ===
The following hybrid varieties and cultivars have gained the Royal Horticultural Society's Award of Garden Merit:-

- 'Broadwell Milkmaid' (auri)
- Charisma series (prim)
- 'Clarence Elliott' (auri)
- Crescendo Series (poly)
  - 'Crescendo Blue Shades'
  - 'Crescendo Bright Red'
  - 'Crescendo Pink and Rose Shades'
- Danova Series (prim)
  - 'Danova Rose'
- 'Francisca' (poly)
- 'Guinevere' (poly)
- Primula × loiseleurii 'Aire Mist' (auri)
- Primula × pubescens (auri)
- 'Tony' (auri)
- 'Wanda' (prim)

=== Hybrids ===
- Primula × kewensis=P. floribunda × P. verticillata (Kew primrose)
- Primula × polyantha=P. veris × P. vulgaris (false oxlip, polyanthus primula)
- Primula × pubescens=P. hirsuta × P. auricula

== Bibliography ==
- Linnaeus, Carl (1753). "Primula". Species Plantarum: exhibentes plantas rite cognitas, ad genera relatas, cum differentiis specificis, nominibus trivialibus, synonymis selectis, locis natalibus, secundum systema sexuale digestas. Vol. 1. Stockholm: Impensis Laurentii Salvii. pp. 142–144. Archived from the original on 6 May 2020., see also Species Plantarum
- Gilmartin, Philip M. (2015). "On the origins of observations of heterostyly in Primula" (PDF). New Phytologist. 208 (1): 39–51. Bibcode:2015NewPh.208...39G. doi:10.1111/nph.13558. PMID 26255981.
- Kelso, Sylvia (1991). "Taxonomy of Primula Sects. Aleuritia and Armerina in North America". Rhodora. 93 (873): 67–99. JSTOR 23312756.
- Kovtonyuk, N. K.; Goncharov, A. A. (June 2009). "Phylogenetic relationships in the genus Primula L. (Primulaceae) inferred from the ITS region sequences of nuclear rDNA". Russian Journal of Genetics. 45 (6): 663–670. doi:10.1134/S1022795409060052. S2CID 30118798.
- Martins, L.; Oberprieler, C.; Hellwig, F. H. (2003). "A phylogenetic analysis of Primulaceae s.l. based on internal transcribed spacer (ITS) DNA sequence data". Plant Systematics and Evolution. 237 (1–2): 75–85. Bibcode:2003PSyEv.237...75M. doi:10.1007/s00606-002-0258-1. S2CID 43988431.
- Mast, Austin R.; Kelso, Sylvia; Richards, A. John; Lang, Daniela J.; Feller, Danielle M. S.; Conti, Elena (2001). "Phylogenetic Relationships in Primula L. and Related Genera (Primulaceae) Based on Noncoding Chloroplast DNA". International Journal of Plant Sciences. 162 (6): 1381–1400. Bibcode:2001IJPlS.162.1381M. doi:10.1086/323444. JSTOR 323444. S2CID 59929813.
- "The American Primrose Society". Archived from the original on 6 June 2021.

=== Species ===
- Basak, Sandip Kumar; Maiti, G. G. (2000). "Primula arunachalensis sp. nov. (Primulaceae) from the Eastern Himalaya". Acta Phytotaxonomica et Geobotanica. 51 (1): 11–15. doi:10.18942/bunruichiri.KJ00001077444.
- Ming, Hu Chi; Ying, Geng Yu (2003). "Two New Species of Primula (Primulaceae) from China" (PDF). Novon. 13 (2): 196–199. Bibcode:2003Novon..13..196M. doi:10.2307/3393518. JSTOR 3393518. Archived (PDF) from the original on 4 March 2016.
- Fu, Kunjun; Ohba, Hideaki; Gilbert, Michael G. (2004). "Primula". Archived from the original on 15 May 2021., in Flora of China online vol. 15
- Little, R. John; McKinney, Landon E. (2003). "Primula". Flora of North America. New York: Oxford University Press. Archived from the original on 6 June 2021.
- GRIN (2021). "Species of Primula". U.S. National Plant Germplasm System (GRIN). Agricultural Research Service, USDA. Archived from the original on 6 June 2021.
