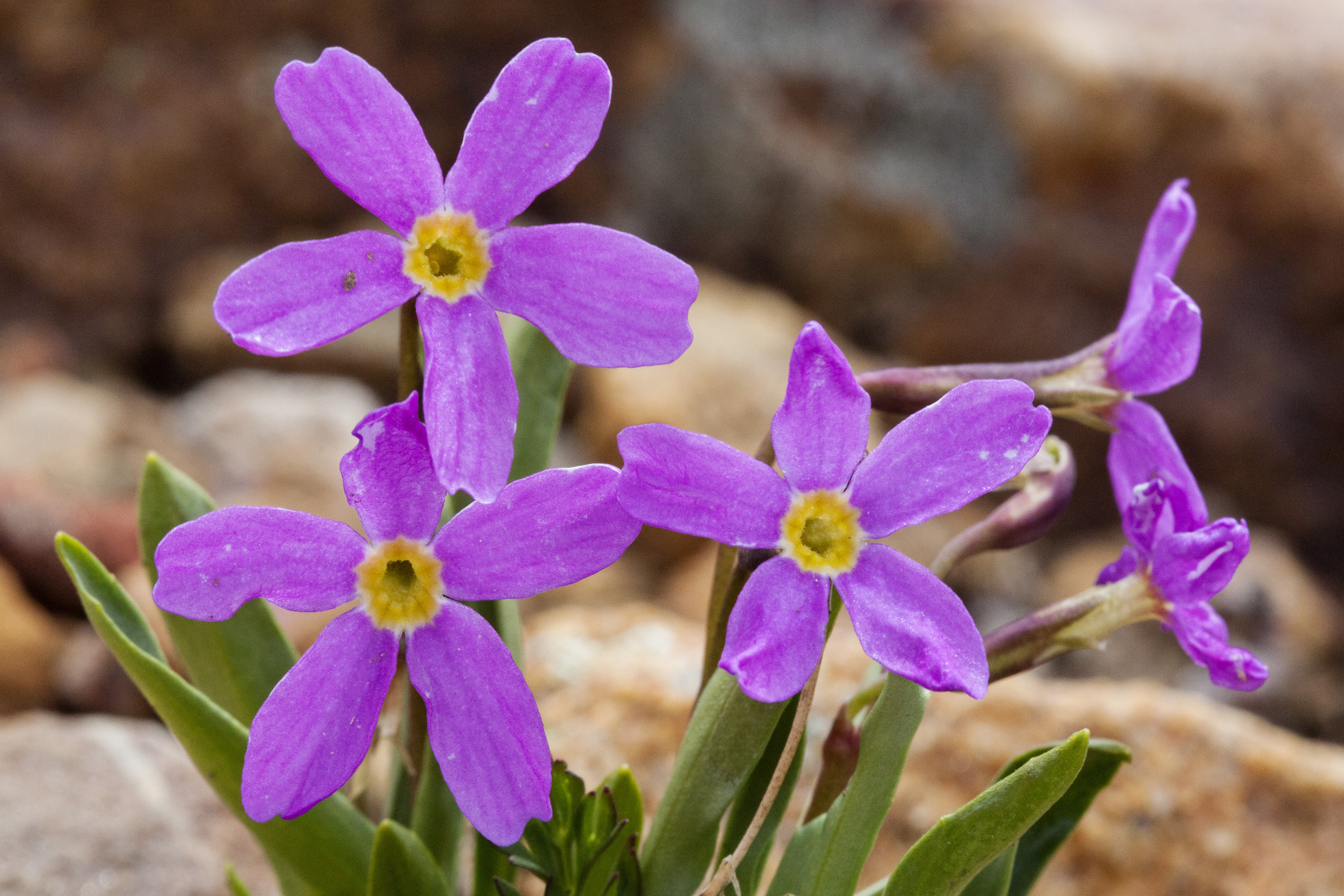

Scientific classification
- Kingdom: Plantae
- Clade: Tracheophytes
- Clade: Angiosperms
- Clade: Eudicots
- Clade: Asterids
- Order: Ericales
- Family: Primulaceae
- Genus: Primula
- Species: P. angustifolia

Binomial name
- Primula angustifolia (Torrey 1823)

= Primula angustifolia =

Species of flowering plant

Primula angustifolia, also known as alpine primrose, is a species of flowering plant in the family Primulaceae, native to the Rocky Mountains of the United States. It is commonly found in Colorado and New Mexico.

== Description ==
Primula angustifolia is a dwarf plant, 1 to 7 cm (.39 to 2.75 in) tall. Leaves are lanceolate to oblanceolate, folded slightly inwards and 2–5 cm (.78 to 1.96 in) long. The plant grows as a single stem or in clumps. Flowers are notched, varying in color from pink to lilac to deep purple, with a yellow eye. Flowers can be up to 20 mm in diameter, and can appear too large for the diminutive plant. Plants often range in size, flower number and flower color. White flowered plants are generally found in New Mexico. The plant blooms from June to August.

== Distribution and habitat ==
The plant's distribution is the Rocky Mountains of Colorado and northern New Mexico. It is typically found above the tree-line in tundra habitats and in rocky locations above 3000 m. (9842 ft).

== Cultivation ==
Often long-lived in cultivation, the plant is free-flowering but rarely produces seed. Plants do best when grown in containers under glass, in a rich sandy mix. Plants have done well outdoors in Scotland, grown in troughs.
