= List of Primulales of Montana =

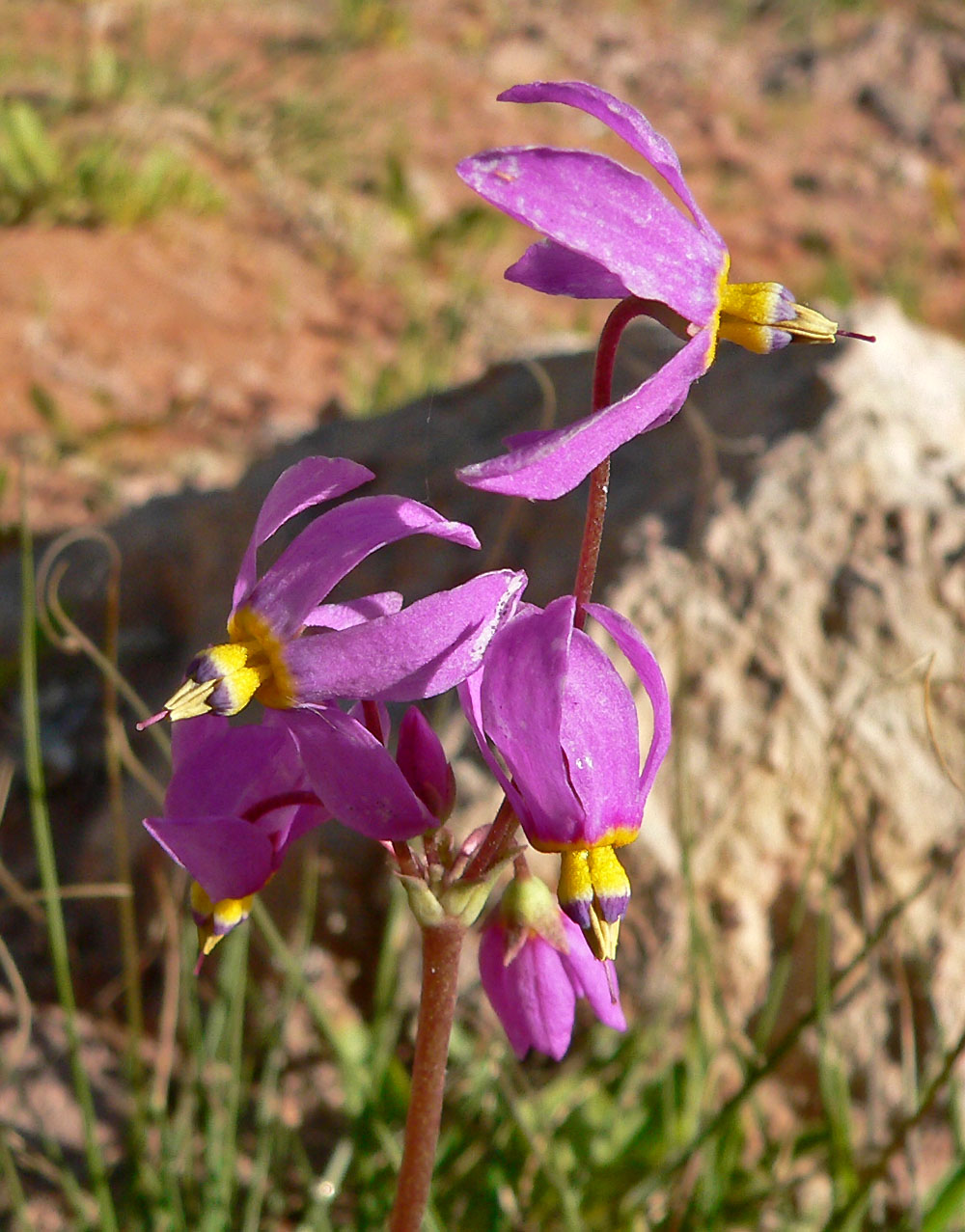
Few-flowered shootingstar, Dodecatheon pulchellum

There are at least 18 members of the primrose order, Primulales, found in Montana. Some of these species are exotics (not native to Montana) and some species have been designated as Species of Concern.

Family: Primulaceae

- Anagallis arvensis, scarlet pimpernel
- Androsace chamaejasme, sweet-flower rock-jasmine
- Androsace filiformis, filiform rockjasmine
- Androsace occidentalis, western rock-jasmine
- Androsace septentrionalis, pygmy-flower rock-jasmine
- Centunculus minimus, chaffweed
- Dodecatheon conjugens, Bonneville shootingstar
- Dodecatheon jeffreyi, Jeffrey's shootingstar
- Dodecatheon pulchellum, few-flower shootingstar
- Douglasia conservatorum, Bloom Peak douglasia
- Douglasia montana, mountain douglasia
- Glaux maritima, sea milkwort
- Lysimachia ciliata, fringed loosestrife
- Lysimachia thyrsiflora, water loosestrife
- Primula alcalina, alkali primrose
- Primula incana, mealy primrose
- Primula parryi, Parry's primrose

== See also ==
- List of dicotyledons of Montana
