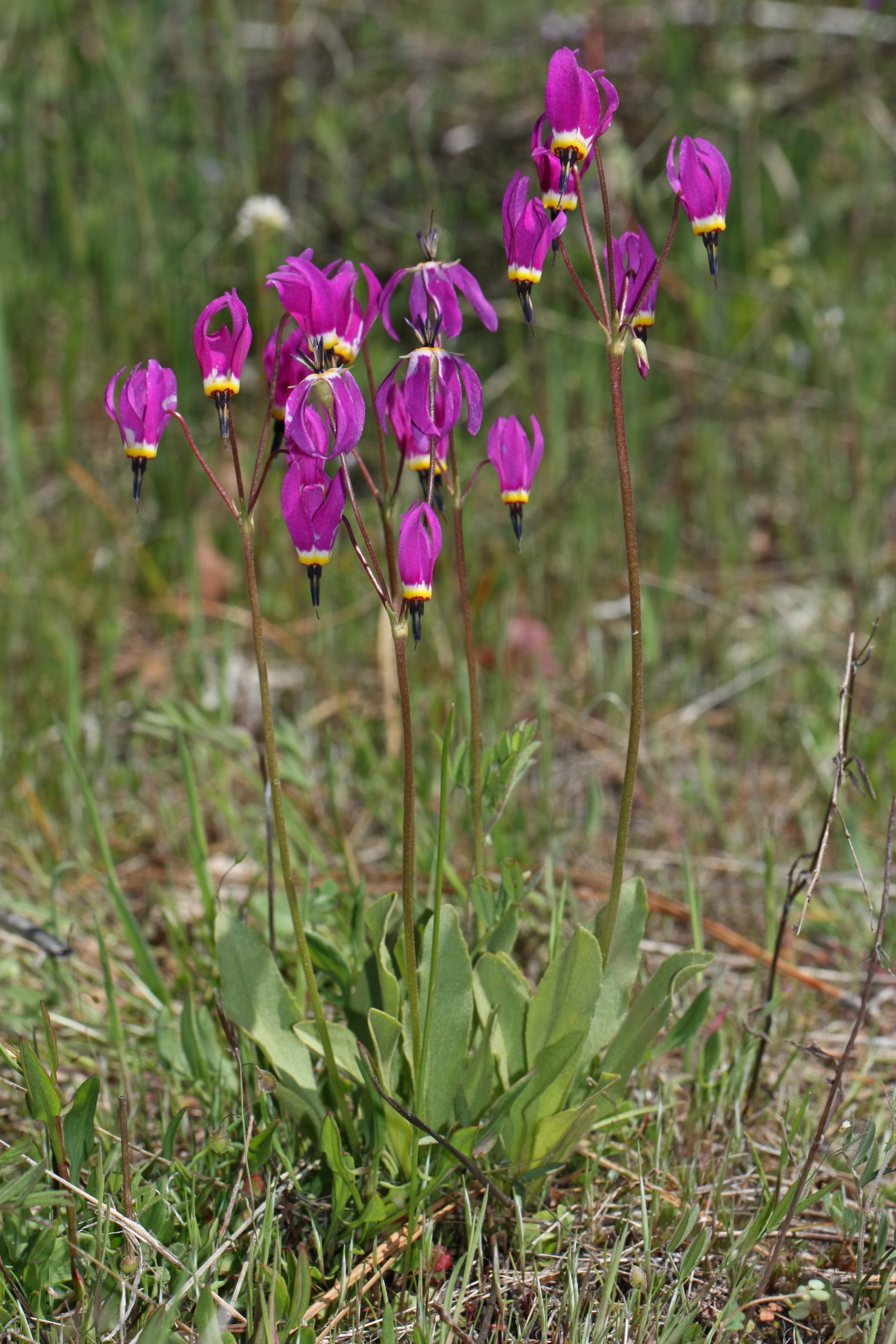

Conservation status
- Vulnerable (NatureServe)

Scientific classification
- Kingdom: Plantae
- Clade: Tracheophytes
- Clade: Angiosperms
- Clade: Eudicots
- Clade: Asterids
- Order: Ericales
- Family: Primulaceae
- Genus: Primula
- Section: Primula sect. Dodecatheon
- Species: P. poetica

Binomial name
- Primula poetica (L.F.Hend.) A.R.Mast & Reveal

Synonyms
- Dodecatheon poeticum L.F.Hend.

= Primula poetica =

Species of flowering plant

Primula poetica, synonym Dodecatheon poeticum, is commonly known as the poet's shooting star or the narcissus shooting star. P. poetica is a species of the genus Primula placed in section Dodecatheon. It is native to the states of Oregon and Washington in western North America. The section contains herbaceous flowering plants and is also a part of the primrose family Primulaceae. This plant has basal clumps of leaves and drooping flowers that occur at the apex of tall stems that rise from where the leaves join.

== Description ==
Primula poetica has erect stems and leaves. It arises from a root with many fibrous fibers which become fleshy during flowering time. All the flower parts above ground except the corolla are glandular and are covered by fine short hairs.

The leaves are grouped in alternate, opposite or whorled distributions. The leaves are entire to lobed in shape and are 5 to 12 centimeters in length. The leaves vary from narrowly egg shaped with the widest section below the middle to narrowly lance shaped. The leaf margins on P. poetica are more finely toothed than on Primula latiloba (syn. Dodecatheon dentatum). P. poetica has petioles that are about the same length as the leaves or shorter. The petals are unusual and curved often in bright hues of pink to lavender.

The corolla is five lobed similar to P. latiloba while many other species of in P. sect. Dodecatheon only contain four. The flower, composed of both stamens and pistils is deep purple. The corolla is yellow in color at the base and dark purple at the top. The flowers droop slightly.

As the plant continues to age and eventually die, the seed capsules turn completely erect, ripen and discharge their seeds for new plants during the next growing season.

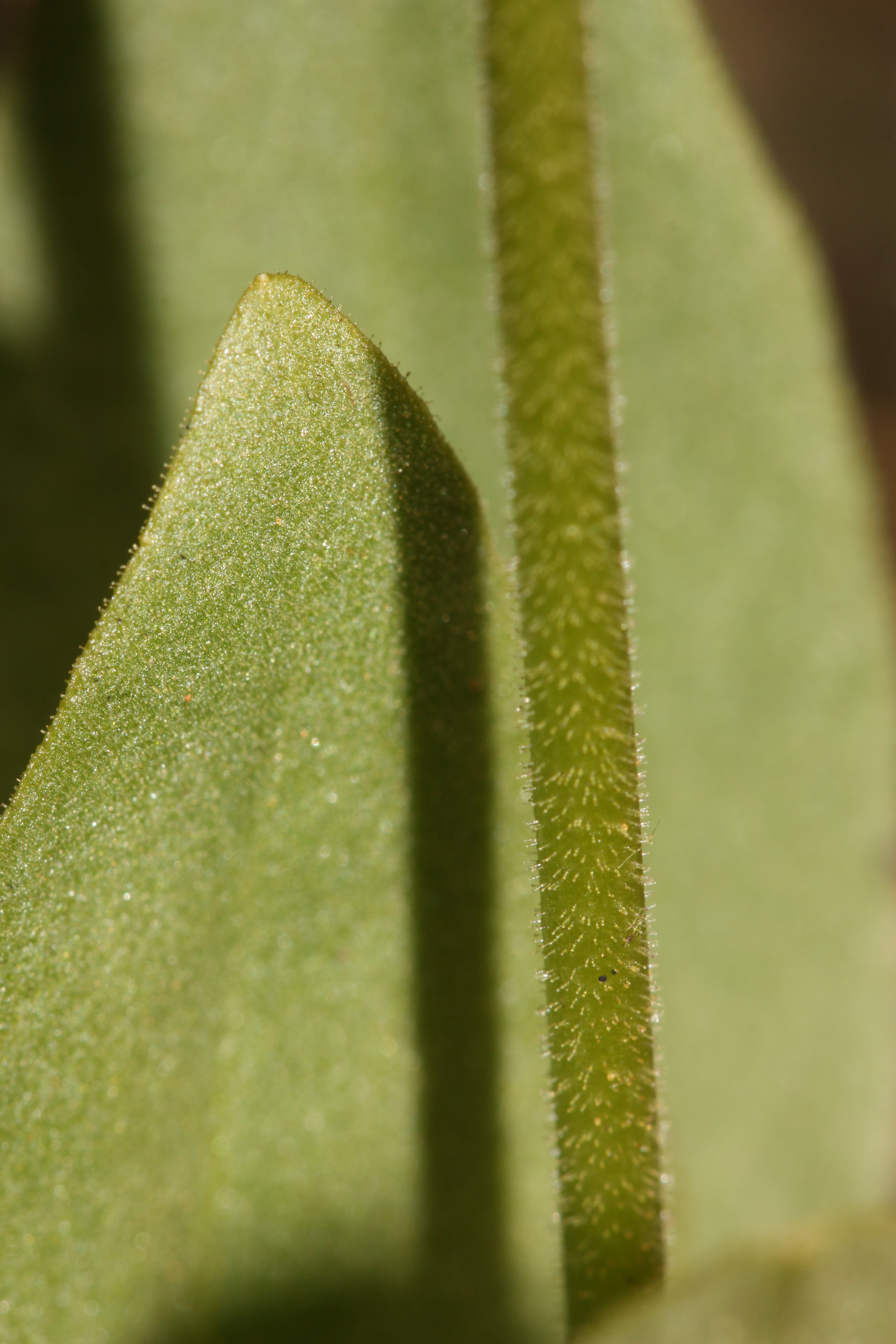
The leaves and pedicel are glandular and covered by fine short hairs

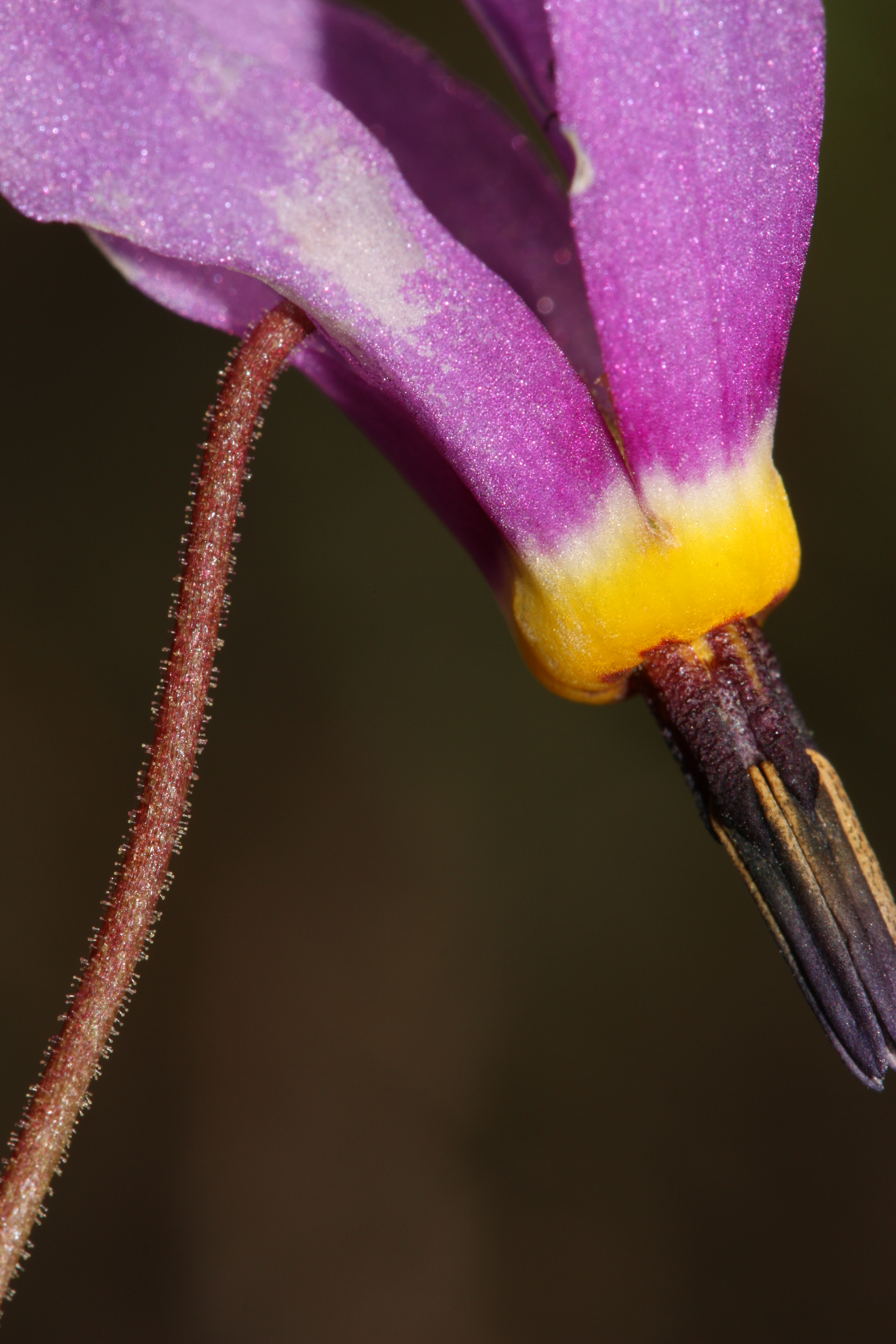
The rugose connective of the stamens is not present in the otherwise similar Primula pauciflora var. cusickii

== Taxonomy ==
The species was first described as Dodecatheon poeticum by Louis F. Henderson of the University of Oregon in 1930. The discovery of this flower was made shortly after the discovery and identification of another plant then placed in the same genus, Primula latiloba (then Dodecatheon dentatum). During the initial description of the white colored P. latiloba, botanists must have overlooked the purple pink P. poetica. Unlike the other species, information regarding P. poetica was rare and many botanists claimed texts describing the diversity of flora in northwestern America rarely mentioned its abundance. Due to recent research and classification efforts, P. poetica now has volumes of information regarding its features and is commonly found in nature and nurseries alike.

== Distribution ==
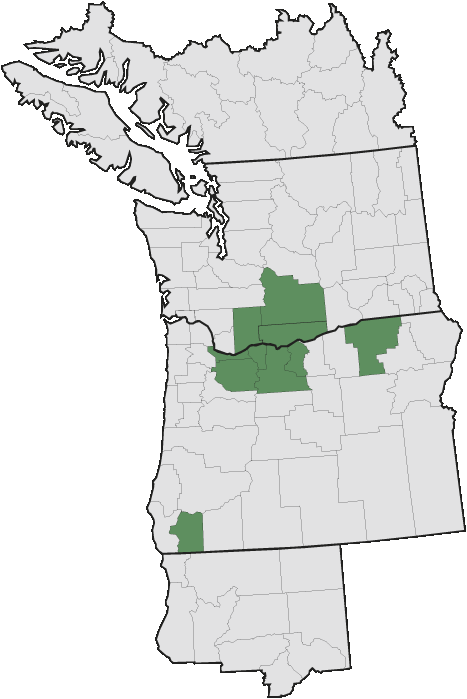
Primula poetica is native to the dryer areas near the lower Columbia River in Washington and Oregon. Other sources do not include Josephine County in southern Oregon.

Primula poetica is mainly found in the Northwestern region of the United States mainly in the arid transition zone in Washington and Oregon.

Compared to other members of its genus, P. poetica is found in more open, sunny areas and in drier woodlands. Occasionally it is found under the shade of Ponderosa pines but is more commonly found in open meadows with ample sunshine. In addition, this plant is also found widely distributed along petroleum seep sites. These flowers flourish in areas that provide abundant springtime moisture followed by dry conditions in the summer.

Primula poetica prefers to grow in a region where the soil is composed of rich humus and fine sand that has been deposited by the winds through the Columbia River Gorge.

They are typically found at an altitude of 0 to 1,677 meters.

== Propagation ==
Primula poetica blooms in a perennial manner. Meaning, as opposed to annual flowers which complete their lifecycle in just one growing season, perennial flowers grow for three or more years at a time.

P. poetica first emerges in the springtime as a small, unassuming basal clump of oval, soft green leaves. After this growth a slender flower stalk rises from a few inches to over a foot above the foliage. This flower generally blooms from March to April, however in the region of the Columbia River Gorge the season can vary by as much as a month or more.

== Pests and diseases ==
Primula poetica is virtually pest and disease free. If grown properly, P. poetica will gradually spread and colonize from self-seeding.
