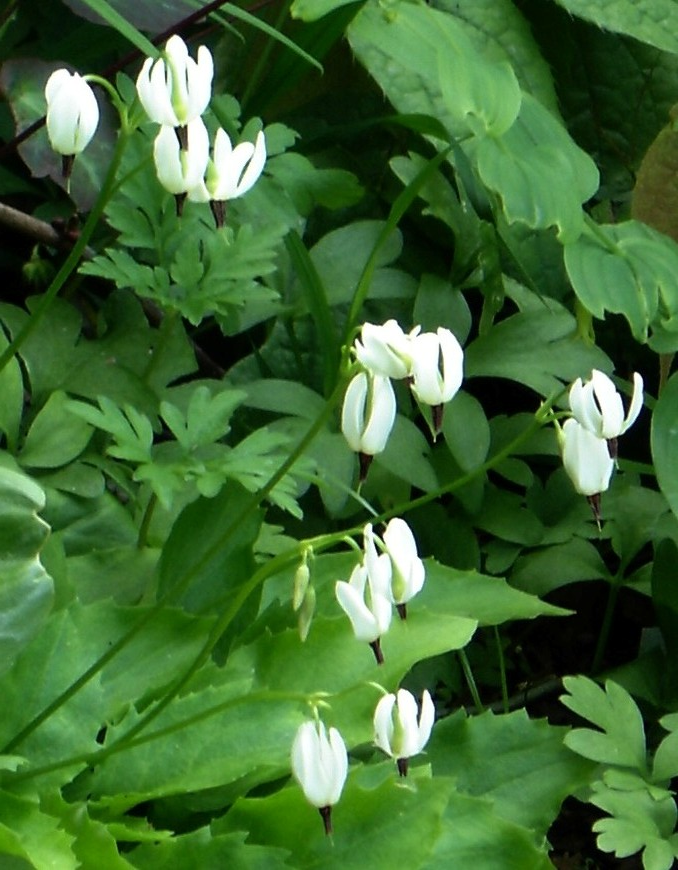

Conservation status
- Apparently Secure (NatureServe)

Scientific classification
- Kingdom: Plantae
- Clade: Tracheophytes
- Clade: Angiosperms
- Clade: Eudicots
- Clade: Asterids
- Order: Ericales
- Family: Primulaceae
- Genus: Primula
- Section: Primula sect. Dodecatheon
- Species: P. latiloba

Binomial name
- Primula latiloba (A.Gray) A.R.Mast & Reveal

Synonyms
- Dodecatheon dentatum Hook.; Dodecatheon frigidum var. dentatum (Hook.) A.Gray; Dodecatheon latilobum (A.Gray) Elmer ex R.Knuth; Dodecatheon meadia var. latilobum A.Gray; Meadia dentata (Hook.) Raf.

= Primula latiloba =

Species of flowering plant

Primula latiloba, synonyms Dodecatheon dentatum and Dodecatheon latilobum, is a species of flowering plant in the family Primulaceae, known by the common names white shooting star and toothed American cowslip.

It is native to areas of western North America, British Columbia, Idaho, Oregon and Washington.

== Description ==
Primula latiloba is an herbaceous perennial growing to 40–50 cm (16–20 in) in height.

This species has toothed (dentate) leaves, hence one of its common names. The leaves have pointed oval blades up to 10 cm long by 6 cm wide with wavy or toothed edges. Each is borne on a long, winged petiole.

The inflorescence contains 1 to 12 flowers. It arises on a tall, erect flowering stalk. The flower corolla has five white lobes each 1 or 2 centimeters long. They are reflexed away from the flower's center, which contains one style surrounded by large reddish, purplish or black anthers containing pollen. Its bloom period is May to July.

The petals are white or cream. It is the only shooting star to have populations with consistently white flowers.

== Taxonomy ==
The species was first described as Dodecatheon dentatum by William Jackson Hooker in 1838. In 1876, Asa Gray described Dodecatheon meadia var. latilobum. In 1905, this taxon was raised to a full species, Dodecatheon latilobum. Dodecatheon latilobum is now regarded as a synonym of Dodecatheon dentatum. In 2007, when the genus Dodecatheon was reduced to a section of Primula, it was necessary to transfer the species to Primula. However, the name Primula dentata had already been published (in 1819) for a different species, so the next oldest epithet was used and Dodecatheon dentatum became Primula latiloba.

=== Subspecies ===
Some subspecies were defined within Dodecatheon dentatum, but are now regarded as separate species.

- Dodecatheon dentatum subsp. ellisiae is a synonym of Primula standleyana.
- Dodecatheon dentatum subsp. utahense is a synonym of Primula utahensis.

No subspecies remain in Primula latiloba.

== Cultivation ==
Primula latiloba is cultivated as a perennial ornamental plant, used in traditional and native plant shade gardens. It is of special value to native bumble bees. The plants usually go dormant almost immediately after flowering.
