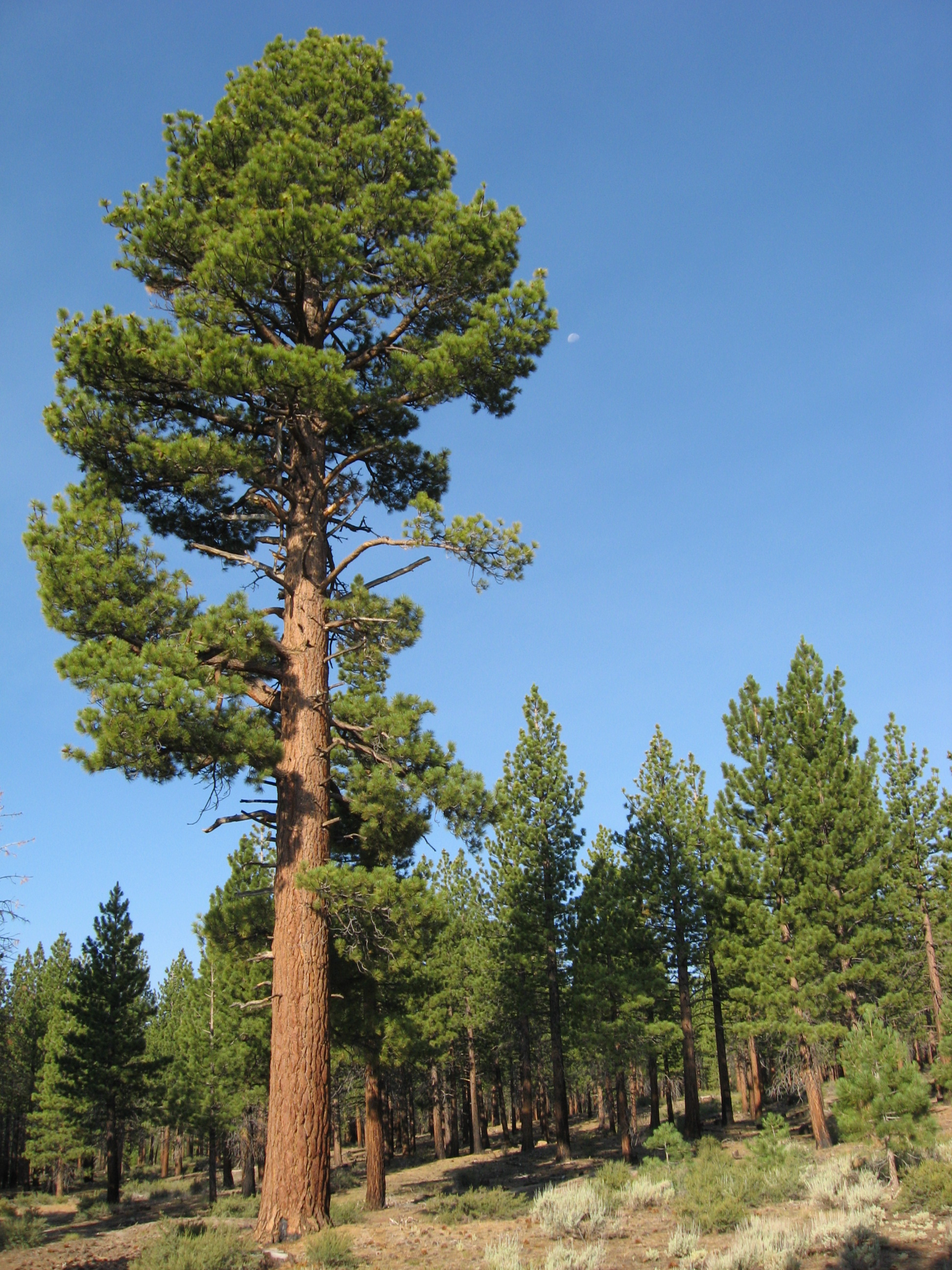
- A stand of Pinus jeffreyi growing on volcanic table lands south of Mono Lake, California

Conservation status
- Least Concern (IUCN 3.1)

Scientific classification
- Kingdom: Plantae
- Clade: Tracheophytes
- Clade: Gymnosperms
- Division: Pinophyta
- Class: Pinopsida
- Order: Pinales
- Family: Pinaceae
- Genus: Pinus
- Subgenus: P. subg. Pinus
- Section: P. sect. Trifoliae
- Subsection: P. subsect. Ponderosae
- Species: P. jeffreyi

Binomial name
- Pinus jeffreyi Balf.
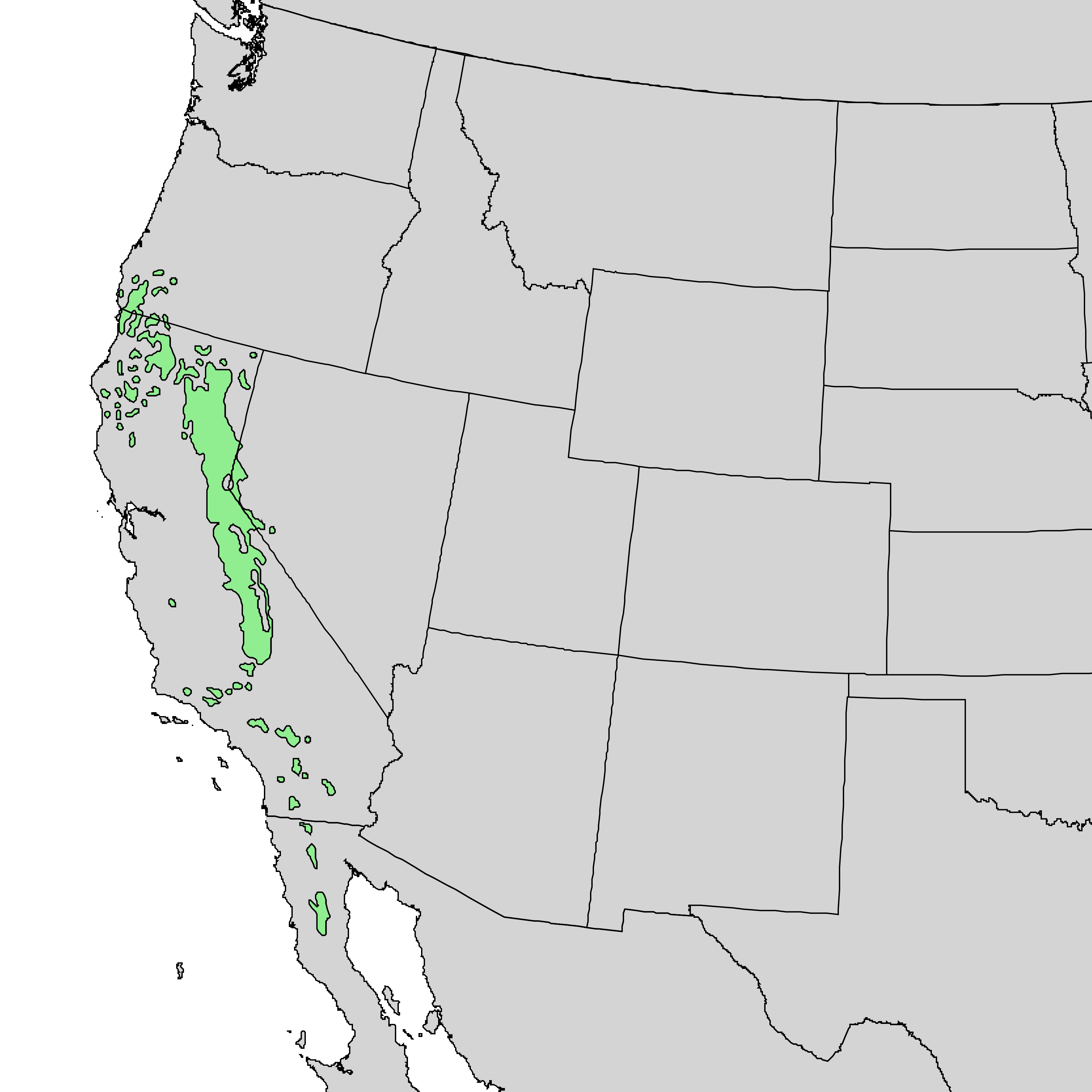

= Pinus jeffreyi =

Pine tree found in North America

Pinus jeffreyi, also known as Jeffrey pine, Jeffrey's pine, yellow pine and black pine, is a North American species of pine tree. It is mainly found in California, but also in the westernmost part of Nevada, southwestern Oregon, and northern Baja California. It is named in honor of its botanist documenter John Jeffrey.

== Description ==
Pinus jeffreyi is a large coniferous tree, reaching 25 to 40 meters (82 to 131 ft) tall, rarely up to 53 m (174 ft) tall, though smaller when growing at or near tree line. The leaves are needle-like, in bundles of three, stout, glaucous gray-green, 12 to 28 centimeters (4 3/4 to 11 in) long. The cones are 12 to 30 cm (4 3/4 to 11 3/4 in) long, dark purple when immature, ripening pale brown, with thinly woody scales bearing a short, sharp inward-pointing barb. The brownish seeds are 10 to 12 millimeters (3/8 to 1/2 in) long, with a large wing, measuring 15 to 25 mm (5/8 to 1 in).

Pinus jeffreyi is closely related to Pinus ponderosa (ponderosa pine) and is similar in appearance. One way to distinguish between them is by their cones. Each has barbs at the end of the scales. The sharp P. jeffreyi cone scale barbs point inward, so the cone feels smooth to the palm of one's hand when rubbed down the cone. Pinus ponderosa cone scale barbs point outward, so feel sharp and prickly to the palm of one's hands. The memory device of 'gentle Jeffrey' and 'prickly ponderosa' can be used to differentiate between the species. Another distinguishing characteristic is that the needles of P. jeffreyi are glaucous, less bright green than those of P. ponderosa, and by the stouter, heavier cones with larger seeds and inward-pointing barbs. Pinus jeffreyi can be somewhat distinguished from P. ponderosa by the relatively smaller scales of reddish-brown bark as compared to the larger plates of orangish ponderosa bark.

The scent of P. jeffreyi is variously described as reminiscent of vanilla, lemon, pineapple, violets, apple, and, quite commonly, butterscotch. This scent may be sampled by breaking off a shoot or some needles, or by simply smelling the resin's scent in between the plates of the bark. This scent is related to the very unusual composition of the resin, with the volatile component made up almost entirely of pure n-heptane. It is because of this peculiarity that the trees are sometimes known as gasoline trees. Easy availability of this hydrocarbon in pure form made it the basis of the modern octane rating in the late 1920s.

The largest specimen, by trunk volume, is the Eureka Valley Giant, in the Stanislaus National Forest. Its trunk contains 129 m^{3} (4,600 cu ft) of wood, is 59 m (194 ft) tall, with a diameter of 2.5 m (8 ft 2 in).

== Taxonomy ==
Pinus jeffreyi is named for its discoverer, Scottish botanist John Jeffrey, who encountered it in 1852 near Mount Shasta. Pinus is Latin for pine.

== Distribution and habitat ==
Pinus jeffreyi occurs from southwest Oregon south through much of California (mainly on the eastern side of the Sierra Nevada), to northern Baja California in Mexico. It is a high-altitude species; in the north of its range, it grows widely at 1,500 to 2,100 m (4,900 to 6,900 ft) altitude, and at 1,800 to 2,900 m (5,900 to 9,500 ft) in the south of its range.

Pinus jeffreyi is more stress tolerant than P. ponderosa. At higher elevations, on poorer soils, in colder climates, and in drier climates, P. jeffreyi replaces P. ponderosa as the dominant tree. Pinus jeffreyi is also tolerant of serpentine soils and is often dominant in these conditions, even on dry sites at fairly low altitudes.

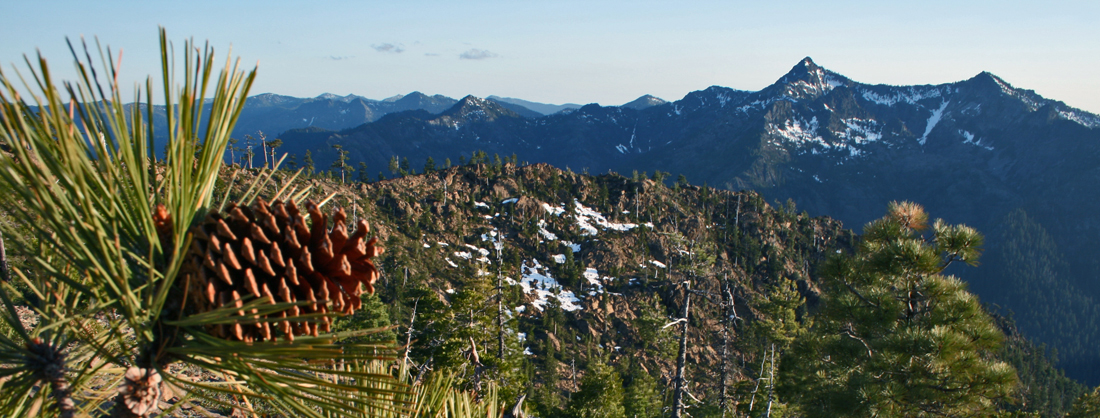
Pinus jeffreyi in the Siskiyou Mountains of northwest California, growing on serpentine

== Ecology ==
Pinus jeffreyi can hybridize with P. ponderosa and the Coulter pine, however this occurrence is rare due to the fact that the pines release pollen at different times of the year.

Mammals and birds collect the seeds.

== Uses ==
Pinus jeffreyi wood is similar to ponderosa pine wood, and is used for the same purposes. Crystallized sap of P. jeffreyi has been eaten as candy. The exceptional purity of n-heptane distilled from P. jeffreyi resin led to n-heptane being selected as the zero point on the octane rating scale of petrol.

As it mainly consists of n-heptane, P. jeffreyi resin is a poor source of turpentine. Before Pinus jeffreyi was distinguished from ponderosa pine as a distinct species in 1853, resin distillers operating in its range suffered a number of "inexplicable" explosions during distillation, now known to have been caused by the unwitting use of Jeffrey pine resin.

== See also ==
- List of California native plants
- Sentinel Dome
