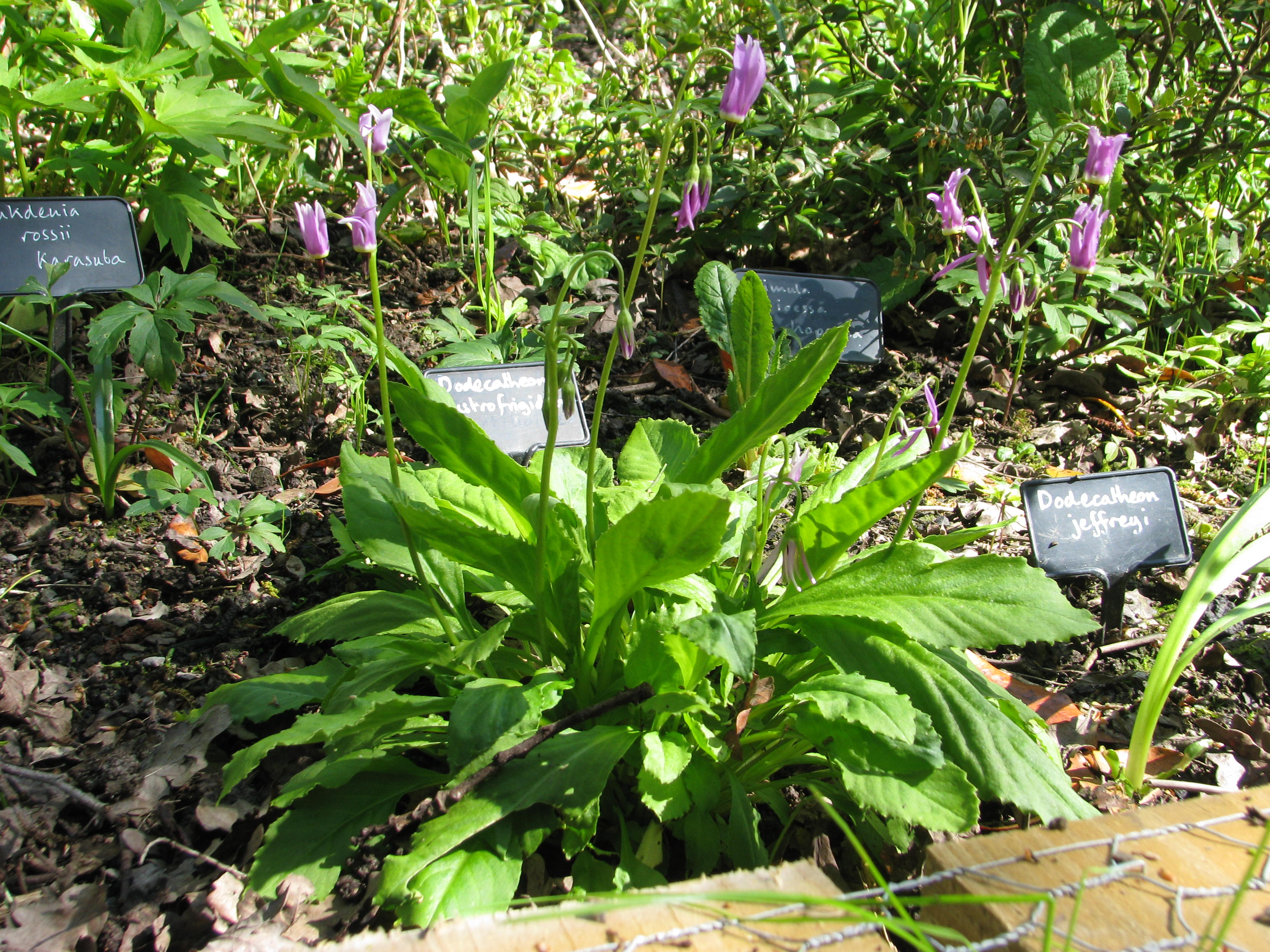

Conservation status
- Imperiled (NatureServe)

Scientific classification
- Kingdom: Plantae
- Clade: Embryophytes
- Clade: Tracheophytes
- Clade: Angiosperms
- Clade: Eudicots
- Clade: Asterids
- Order: Ericales
- Family: Primulaceae
- Genus: Primula
- Section: Primula sect. Dodecatheon
- Species: P. austrofrigida

Binomial name
- Primula austrofrigida (K.L.Chambers) A.R.Mast & Reveal

Synonyms
- Dodecatheon austrofrigidum K.L.Chambers

= Primula austrofrigida =

Species of flowering plant

Primula austrofrigida, syn. Dodecatheon austrofrigidum, is a species of flowering plant in the primrose family known by the common names frigid shooting star and tundra shooting star. It is native to Washington and Oregon in the United States, where it grows in the coastal mountain ranges, including those on the Olympic Peninsula.

This plant has a basal clump of leaves with dimensions up to 30 by 7 centimetres (11.8 in × 2.8 in) and smooth to wavy or somewhat toothed edges. The inflorescence is borne on a flowering stalk up to 45 centimetres (18 in) tall. It has one to seven flowers with magenta corolla lobes up to 2 centimetres (0.79 in) long or more which are reflexed away from the flower center. The stamens are maroon or purple and form a protruding tube.

This plant grows on rocky slopes on river banks and other seasonally moist, rocky areas. It may grow with various mosses that form a substrate that it can root in. Associated plants include Alnus rubra, Filipendula occidentalis, Rubus parviflorus, Rubus spectabilis, Saxifraga occidentalis, Cascadia nuttallii, Micranthes mertensiana, and Erythranthe guttata, though it often grows on slopes with few other plants around. At higher elevations the plant occupies grassy turf. The soil is thin. The plant has also been found growing in substrates of decomposing wood. Associated species at higher elevations include Abies amabilis, Tsuga heterophylla, Cladothamnus sp., and Synthyris schizantha.

This plant is known to occur at only about eight locations. Populations are small and scattered. Threats include increased flooding caused by grazing and logging upstream. The status of the rivers next to populations affects population size; the plant numbers may decrease during flood conditions and then increase the following year.
