= John Jeffrey (botanist) =

British botanist (1826–1854)

John Jeffrey (14 November 1826 – 1854) was a Scottish botanist and plant-hunter active in the United States.

== Life ==
Jeffrey was born in Forneth, Parish of Clunie, west of Blairgowrie and Rattray in east Perthshire. While working as a gardener for Edinburgh's Royal Botanic Garden, he was appointed by a Scottish group known as the Oregon Association (established 1849) to travel to North America. There he would collect seeds and continue the efforts of botanist David Douglas (1799–1834).

Jeffrey arrived at Hudson Bay in August 1850 and travelled more than 1,200 miles (1,900 km) overland to reach the Columbia River. He then spent the next four years exploring Washington, Oregon, and California, sending his specimens back to Scotland. In 1854 he disappeared while travelling from San Diego across the Colorado Desert. Despite attempts to find him, he was never seen again.

At the time, Jeffrey was criticised for poor results but his discoveries, particularly of conifers, were significant. The Jeffrey Pine (Pinus jeffreyi), which he discovered near California's Mount Shasta in 1852, and the flowering plant Dodecatheon jeffreyi were named in his honour.
