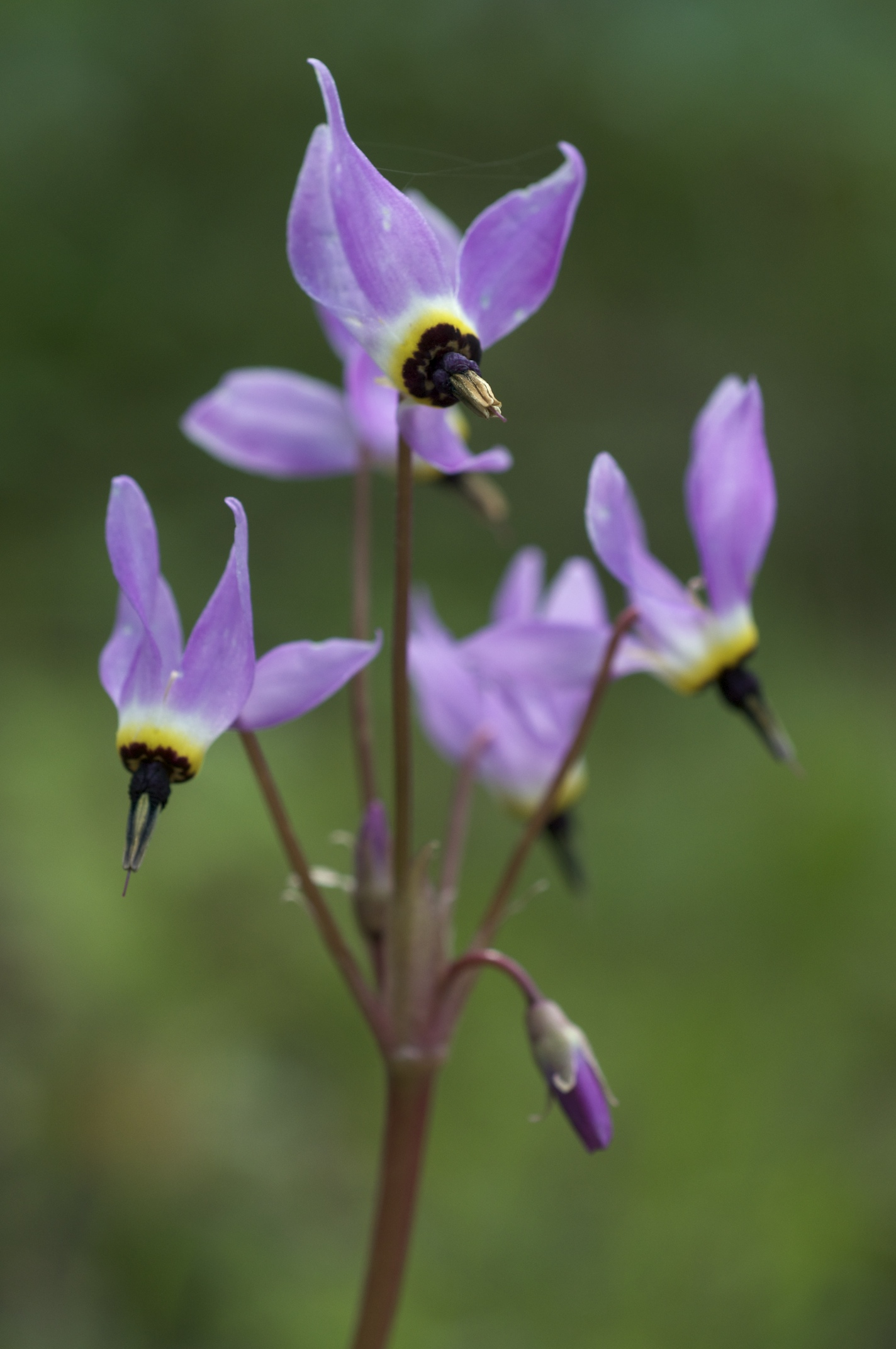

Conservation status
- Secure (NatureServe)

Scientific classification
- Kingdom: Plantae
- Clade: Tracheophytes
- Clade: Angiosperms
- Clade: Eudicots
- Clade: Asterids
- Order: Ericales
- Family: Primulaceae
- Genus: Primula
- Section: Primula sect. Dodecatheon
- Species: P. hendersonii

Binomial name
- Primula hendersonii (A. Gray) A.R. Mast & Reveal

Synonyms
- Dodecatheon atratum Greene; Dodecatheon cruciatum Greene; Dodecatheon ellipticum Nutt. ex Durand; Dodecatheon hansenii (Greene) H.J.Thomps.; Dodecatheon hendersonii A.Gray; Dodecatheon hendersonii var. cruciatum (Greene) Greene; Dodecatheon hendersonii subsp. cruciatum (Greene) H.J.Thomps.; Dodecatheon hendersonii subsp. hansenii (Greene) Kartesz; Dodecatheon hendersonii var. hansenii Greene; Dodecatheon hendersonii subsp. parvifolium (R.Knuth) H.J.Thomps.; Dodecatheon hendersonii var. typicum R.Knuth; Dodecatheon integrifolium var. latifolium Hook.; Dodecatheon latifolium (Hook.) Piper; Dodecatheon meadia var. brevifolium A.Gray; Dodecatheon meadia var. ellipticum K.Brandegee; Dodecatheon meadia var. hendersonii (A.Gray) K.Brandegee; Dodecatheon meadia var. parvifolium (R.Knuth) E.D.Br.; Dodecatheon patulum var. parvifolium R.Knuth; Meadia hendersonii (A.Gray) Kuntze; Meadia hendersonii var. cruciata (Greene) Greene

= Primula hendersonii =

Species of flowering plant

Primula hendersonii is a species of flowering plant in the family Primulaceae, native to western North America, from California north to southern British Columbia and Idaho. Common names include broad-leaved shooting star, Henderson's shooting star, mosquito bills, and sailor caps.

== Description ==
P. hendersonii is summer deciduous, dying back to the ground after the rains cease. It has basal clumps of leaves, 2–16 cm, with nodding flowers 6–25 mm long on stems 10–30 cm tall. The flowers are magenta to deep lavender to white, with the stamens thrust out and the sepals bent back. It is highly variable and hybridizes with Primula clevelandii, from which it can be distinguished by its reddish or purplish stem.

== Distribution and habitat ==
In California, it occurs in the northwest (except the north coast), the Cascade Range, the Sierra Nevada foothills, the Central Valley, the San Francisco Bay Area, the north Inner South Coast Ranges, and the San Bernardino Mountains. It is generally found in open woodlands, from sea level in British Columbia, up to 1,900 m (6,230 ft) altitude in California.

== Cultivation ==
It needs good drainage, and needs a dry summer period. Plants germinated from seed may take 3–5 years to produce flowers. For some plants, with frequent light fertilization and moisture, dormancy may be delayed, and flowering time may be decreased to 1–2 years. Another technique to speed flowering is to place them in a cooler after dormancy, then bring them to a shadehouse in midsummer. It can be propagated by division in winter. It prefers shade when inland.

== Uses ==
The leaves and roots can be eaten when roasted or boiled, but are reported to be poisonous when eaten raw.

== Notes ==
- Jepson Flora Project: Dodecatheon hendersonii
- Plants of British Columbia: Dodecatheon hendersonii
- "Dodecatheon hendersonii". Integrated Taxonomic Information System.
- Cullina, William, and Cullina, Bill (2000) The New England Wild Flower Society Guide to Growing and Propagating Wildflowers of the United States and Canada, Houghton Mifflin Company, ISBN 0-395-96609-4.
- Las Pilitas Incredible Edibles
- "Wildflowers of Henry W. Coe State Park" brochure, Larry Ulrich, 2002
