= George Hazen French =

American biologist (1841-1935)

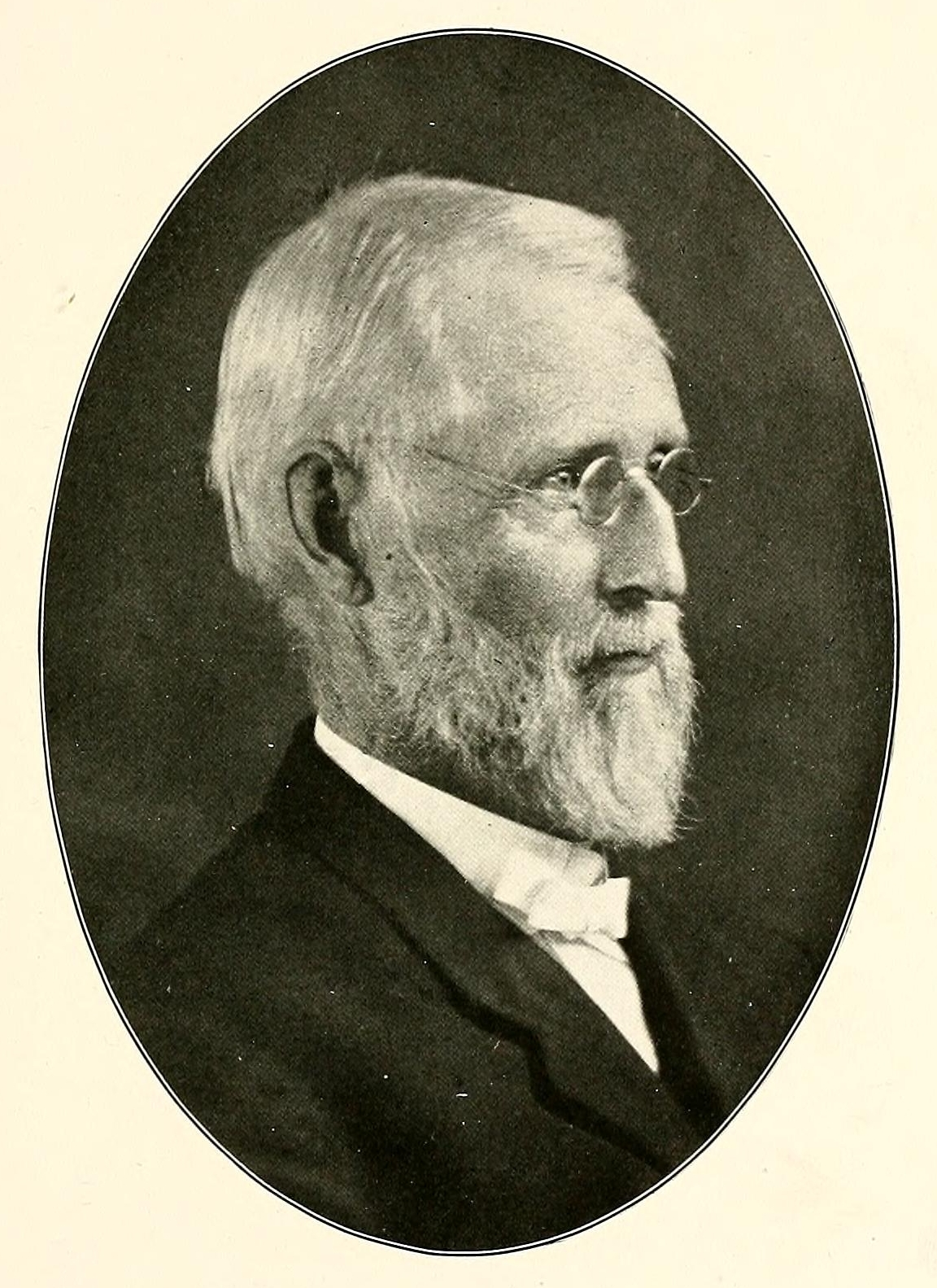
In 1917

George Hazen French (19 March 1841 – 1 January 1935) was a biology teacher and naturalist. He taught natural sciences at the Southern Illinois Normal College, Carbondale and served as curator of its museum. He wrote one of the first field guides to the butterflies of the eastern United States in 1885. French's shooting star (Primula frenchii) is named after him.

== Biography ==
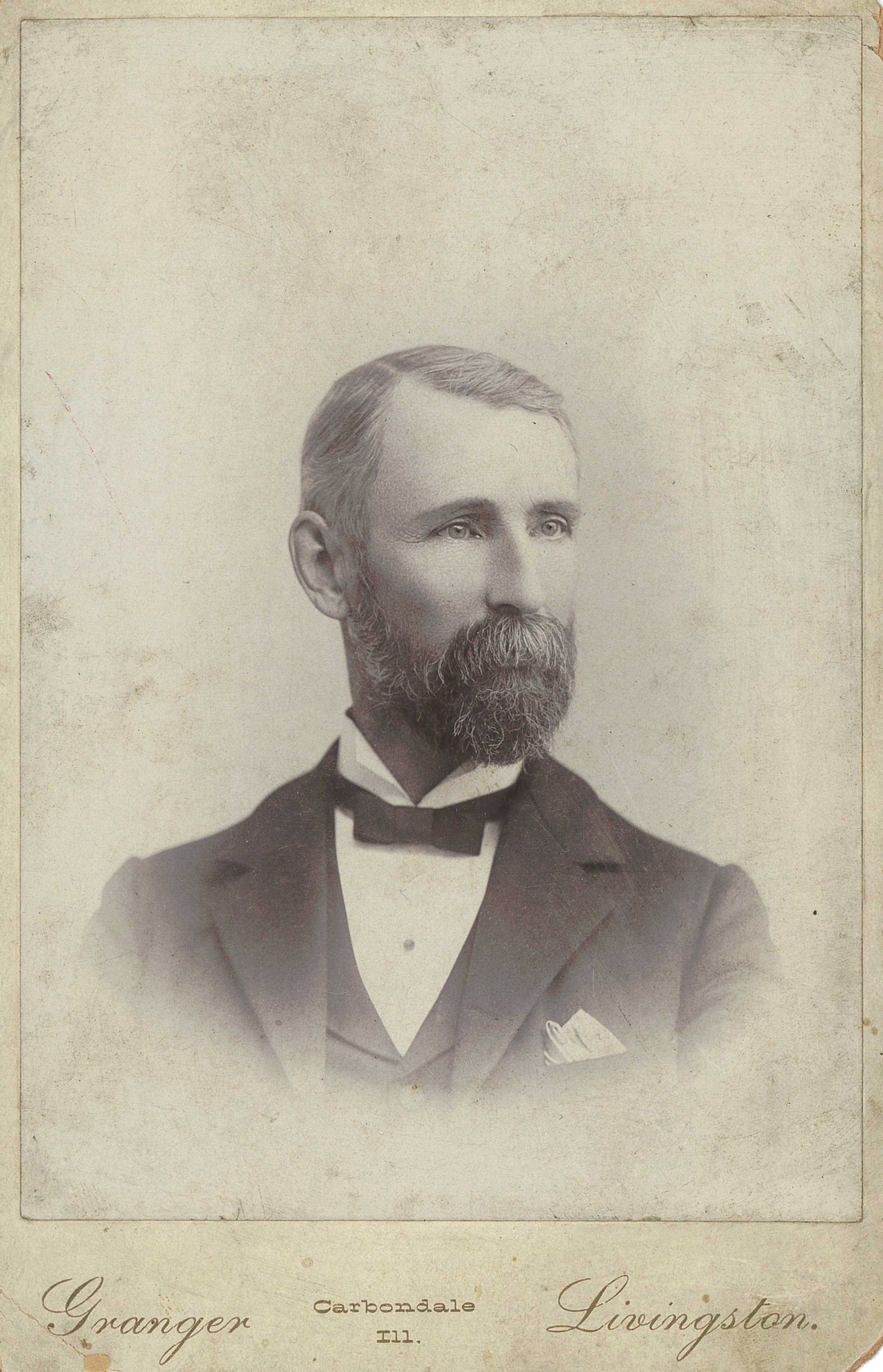
Carte-de-visite

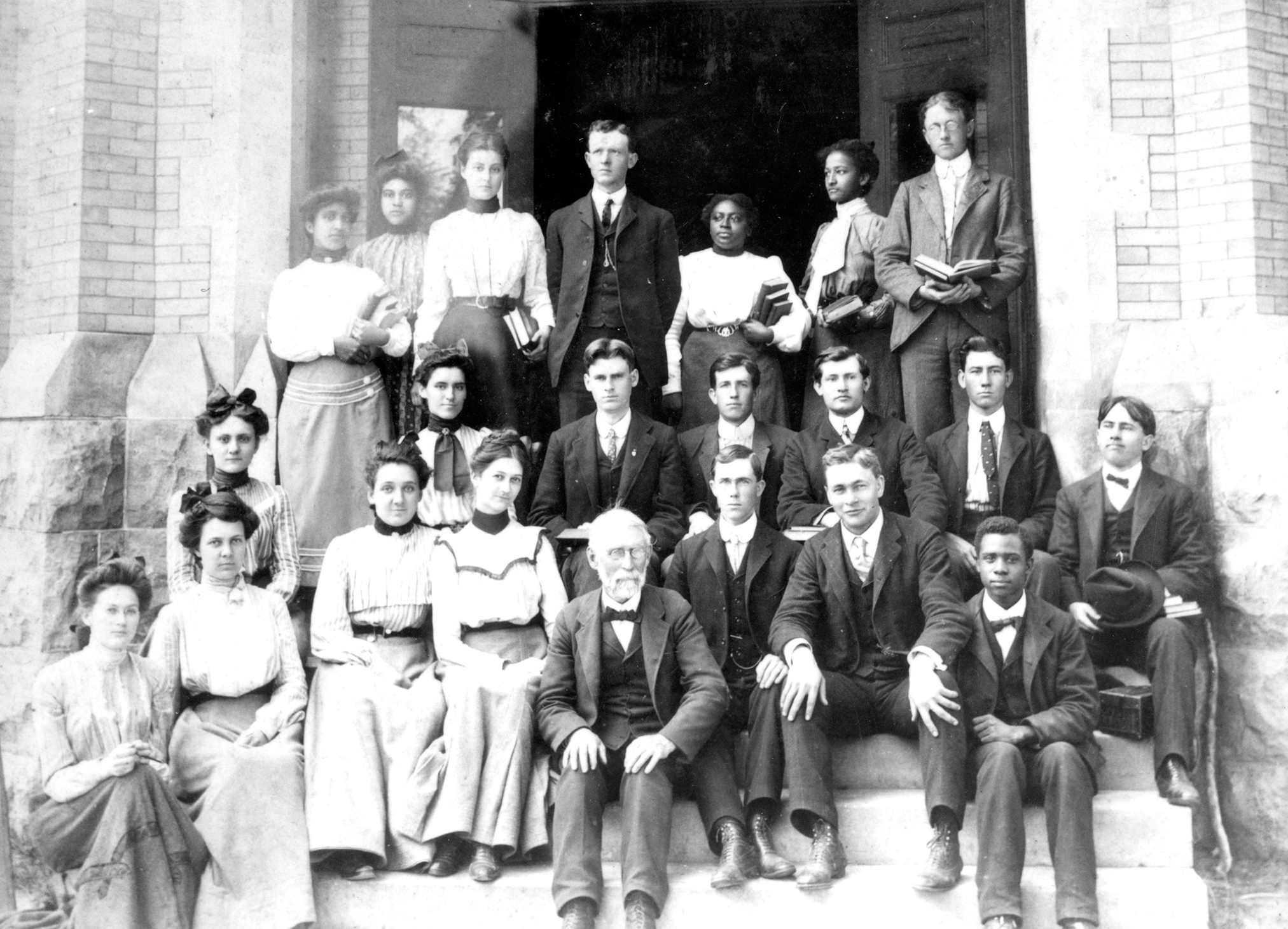
With students in 1908 at the SINU

French was born in Tully, Onondaga County, New York, in the farming family of Hazen and Caroline née White. He went to rural schools but taught himself most subjects including mathematics and languages. He passed the teacher's certificate exam in 1860 and went to Cortand Academy (Cortlandville Normal School) in Cortland, New York, where he studied two semester of medical courses.

He became a teacher in 1865 working in schools and living with the parents of students. French was a meticulous naturalist and kept a daily diary of weather and other phenomena. He taught at South Belvidere School until 1867. In 1868 he got a teaching position at the Illinois Agricultural College, Irvington, and received honorary BS and MS degrees. He married Harriet Ningham (d. 1919) of Makanda in 1872. In 1877 he was an assistant entomologist under Cyrus Thomas. In 1878 he began to teach at the South Illinois Normal College. He made observations and published notes on natural history from across the region. A species of plant Dodecatheon frenchii (now Primula frenchii) was named after him George Vasey. After the destruction of the museum of the South Illinois Normal School from a fire in 1883, he began to rebuild it with his own collections. He established a herbarium with nearly 10,000 specimens. He taught natural history, botany and physiology until 1917. In 1919 he moved from Carbondale to Herrin following the death of his wife. He taught nurses in Herrin Hospital and left his Carbondale house to the care of his housekeeper Julia Carter. In 1926 he was injured in traffic accident and was hospitalized with a fracture below his knee. Based on his knowledge of physiology he took parathyroid extract three times a day along with calcium and was able to sit up in six weeks against a predicted recovery of six months. He wrote about the experimental treatment he received which was also tried on a woman two years older than him (85 years) with a compound fracture, who also made a recovery in four weeks. He returned to Carbondale when he grew too infirm and was taken care of by Julia and her husband Randall Carter. After the death of French, the property was run as a cafe by Carter and by 1947 it was bought by the university.
