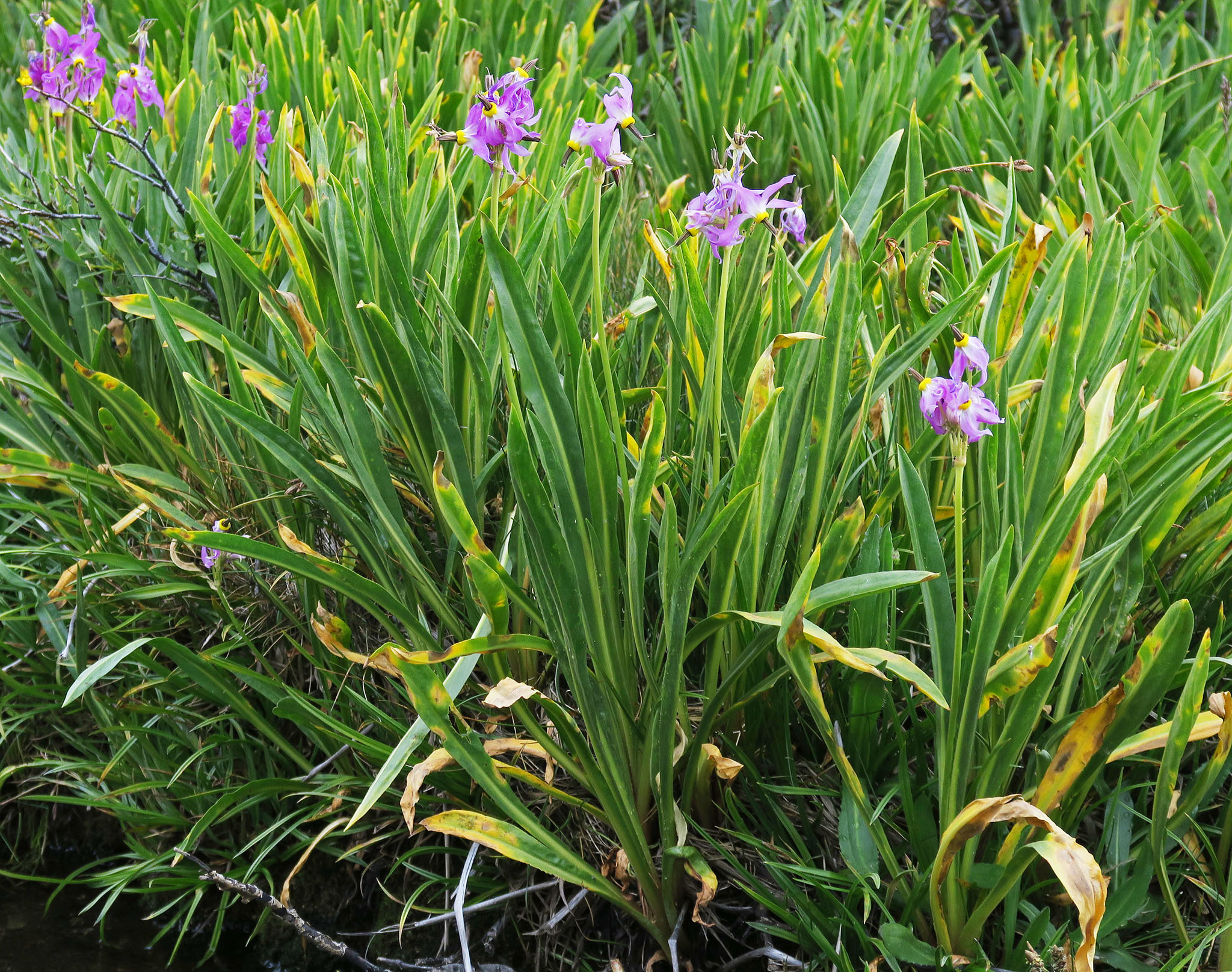

Conservation status
- Apparently Secure (NatureServe)

Scientific classification
- Kingdom: Plantae
- Clade: Embryophytes
- Clade: Tracheophytes
- Clade: Angiosperms
- Clade: Eudicots
- Clade: Asterids
- Order: Ericales
- Family: Primulaceae
- Genus: Primula
- Section: Primula sect. Dodecatheon
- Species: P. fragrans

Binomial name
- Primula fragrans A.R.Mast & Reveal

Synonyms
- Dodecatheon jeffreyi var. redolens H.M.Hall; Dodecatheon redolens (H.M.Hall) H.J.Thomps.

= Primula fragrans =

Species of flowering plant

Primula fragrans, synonym Dodecatheon redolens, has the common name scented shooting star. It is a species of flowering plant in the primrose family.

== Description ==
Primula fragrans is a hairy, thick-rooted perennial with long, clumping leaves around the base.

It erects slim, tall, hairy stems which are dark in color and are topped with inflorescences of 5 to 10 showy flowers. Each flower nods with its mouth pointed to the ground when new, and becomes more erect with age. It has five reflexed sepals in shades of pink, lavender, or white which lie back against the body of the flower. Each sepal base has a blotch of bright yellow and is folded into a thick lip around the mouth of the flower. From the corolla mouth protrude large anthers which may be light pink to nearly black surrounding a threadlike stigma.

== Distribution ==
This wildflower is native from California through Nevada to western Utah. It grows in moist areas, especially in the Sierra Nevada and eastern Transverse Ranges.
