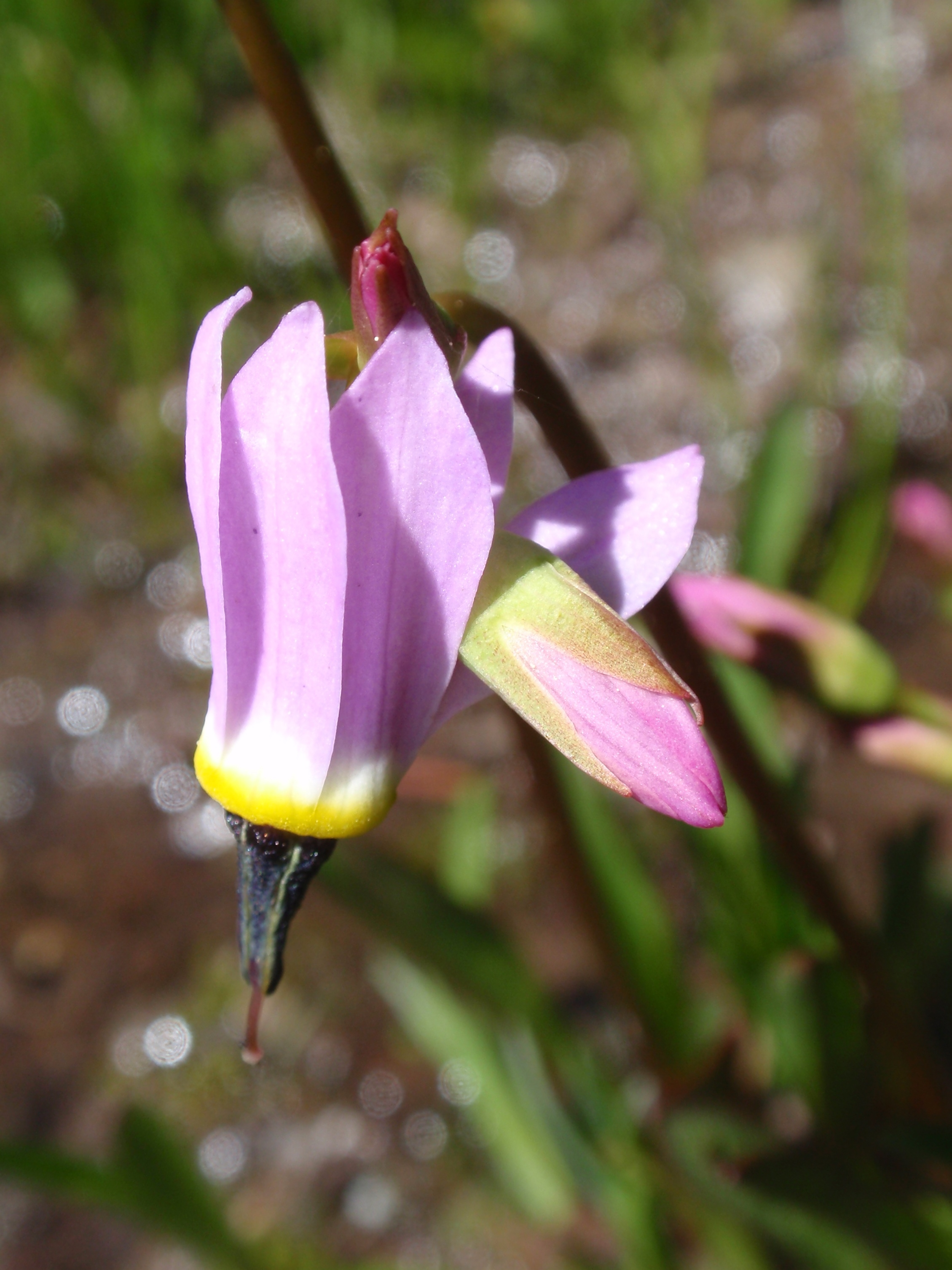

Conservation status
- Vulnerable (NatureServe)

Scientific classification
- Kingdom: Plantae
- Clade: Tracheophytes
- Clade: Angiosperms
- Clade: Eudicots
- Clade: Asterids
- Order: Ericales
- Family: Primulaceae
- Genus: Primula
- Section: Primula sect. Dodecatheon
- Species: P. tetrandra

Binomial name
- Primula tetrandra (Suksd.) A.R.Mast & Reveal

Synonyms
- Dodecatheon alpinum (A.Gray) Greene; Dodecatheon alpinum subsp. majus H.J.Thomps.; Dodecatheon alpinum f. nanum H.M.Hall; Dodecatheon jeffreyi var. tetrandrum (Suksd.) Jeps.; Dodecatheon meadia var. alpinum A.Gray; Dodecatheon tetrandrum Suksd.

= Primula tetrandra =

Species of flowering plant

Primula tetrandra, synonyms Dodecatheon tetrandrum and Dodecatheon alpinum, is a perennial plant in the primrose family, Primulaceae, known by the common name alpine shooting star.

This wildflower is native to the Western United States, in California, Arizona, Nevada, Oregon, Utah and Washington. The plant grows in wet areas in the mountains, such as in the Sierra Nevada and Transverse Ranges.

== Description ==
Primula tetrandra is partially aquatic, sometimes growing along the edges of bogs and in shallow, slow rivulets. This is a thick-rooted perennial with narrow, straight leaves around the base.

It erects slim, tall stems which are dark in color and are topped with inflorescences of one or more showy flowers. Each flower nods with its mouth pointed to the ground when new, and becomes more erect with age. It has four reflexed sepals in shades of bright pink or lavender which lie back against the body of the flower. These may have bases of white or yellow which rim the corolla. From the corolla mouth protrude large black anthers and a thready stigma.

It flowers from June to August.
