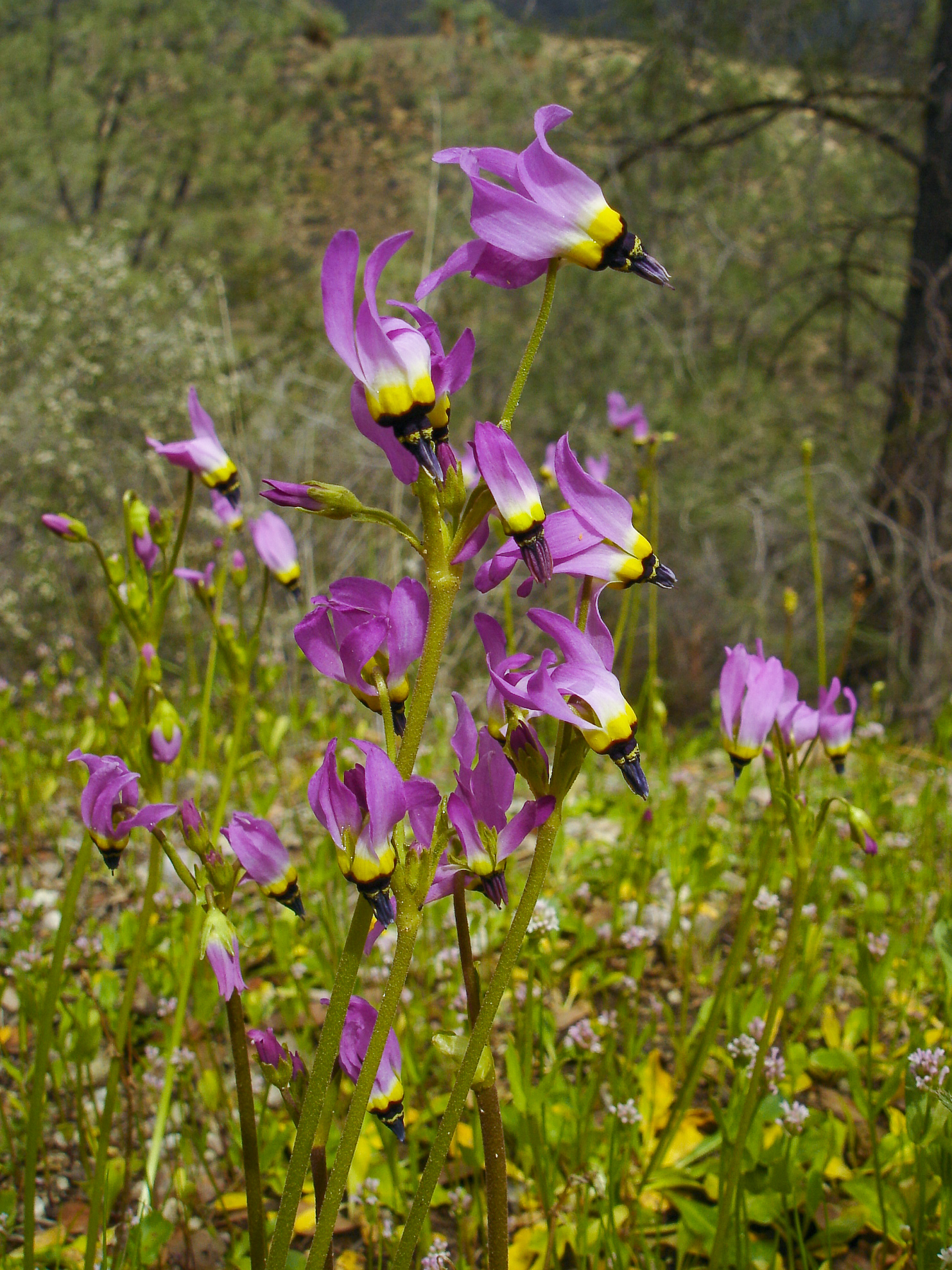
- San Benito County, California, 2009

Conservation status
- Imperiled (NatureServe)

Scientific classification
- Kingdom: Plantae
- Clade: Embryophytes
- Clade: Tracheophytes
- Clade: Angiosperms
- Clade: Eudicots
- Clade: Asterids
- Order: Ericales
- Family: Primulaceae
- Genus: Primula
- Section: Primula sect. Dodecatheon
- Species: P. clevelandii

Binomial name
- Primula clevelandii (Greene) A.R.Mast & Reveal

Synonyms
- Dodecatheon clevelandii Greene; Meadia clevelandii (Greene) Kuntze

= Primula clevelandii =

Padre's shooting star

Species of flowering plant

Primula clevelandii, with the common name of Padre's shooting star, is a species of primrose.

Its specific epithet clevelandii honors 19th-century San Diego–based plant collector and lawyer Daniel Cleveland.

== Description ==
Primula clevelandii is spring deciduous, dying back to the ground after the rains cease. It has basal clumps of leaves up to 40 centimetres (16 in) long.

The flowers are magenta to deep lavender to white. They are nodding flowers each about an inch long on stems up to a foot tall.

This species hybridizes with Primula hendersonii, from which it can be distinguished by its green stem.

== Subspecies ==
Named subspecies include:

- Primula clevelandii ssp. clevelandii – The autonymous subspecies. In Baja California, it is found in the northwestern part of the state at low elevations from Tijuana south to El Rosario.
- Primula clevelandii ssp. gracilis – Known commonly as the island shooting star. Found on the California Channel Islands and Guadalupe Island in Mexico.
- Primula clevelandii ssp. insularis
- Primula clevelandii ssp. patula

== Distribution ==
The plant is native to California and Baja California. It is generally found in open grassland areas.
