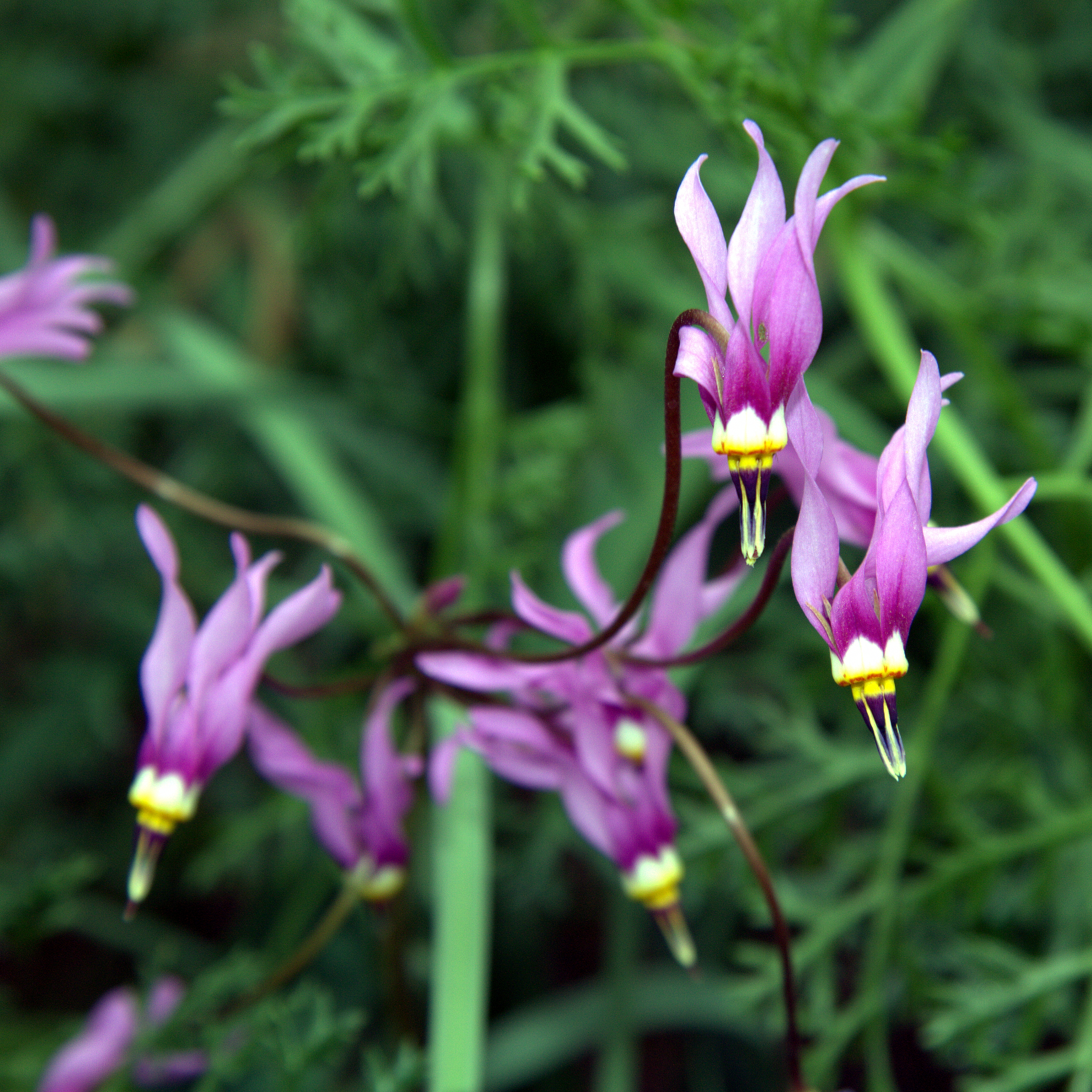
- Primula pauciflora (Dodecatheon pulchellum) (Fidalgo Island, Washington)

Scientific classification
- Kingdom: Plantae
- Clade: Embryophytes
- Clade: Tracheophytes
- Clade: Angiosperms
- Clade: Eudicots
- Clade: Asterids
- Order: Ericales
- Family: Primulaceae
- Genus: Primula
- Subgenus: Primula subg. Auriculastrum
- Section: Primula sect. Dodecatheon (L.) A.R.Mast & Reveal

Species
- See text

= Primula sect. Dodecatheon =

Section of flowering plants

Primula sect. Dodecatheon is a section of herbaceous flowering plants in the family Primulaceae. Primula species in this section were formerly placed in a separate genus, Dodecatheon. The species have basal clumps of leaves and nodding flowers that are produced at the top of tall stems rising from where the leaves join the crown. The genus is largely confined to North America and part of northeastern Siberia. Common names include shooting star, American cowslip, mosquito bills, mad violets, and sailor caps. A few species are grown in gardens for their showy and unique flower display.

The stamens are thrust out with the sepals bent back. The flowers are pollinated by bees, which grab hold of the petals, and gather pollen by vibrating the flowers by buzzing their wings (buzz pollination). The vibration releases pollen from the anthers.

== Taxonomy ==
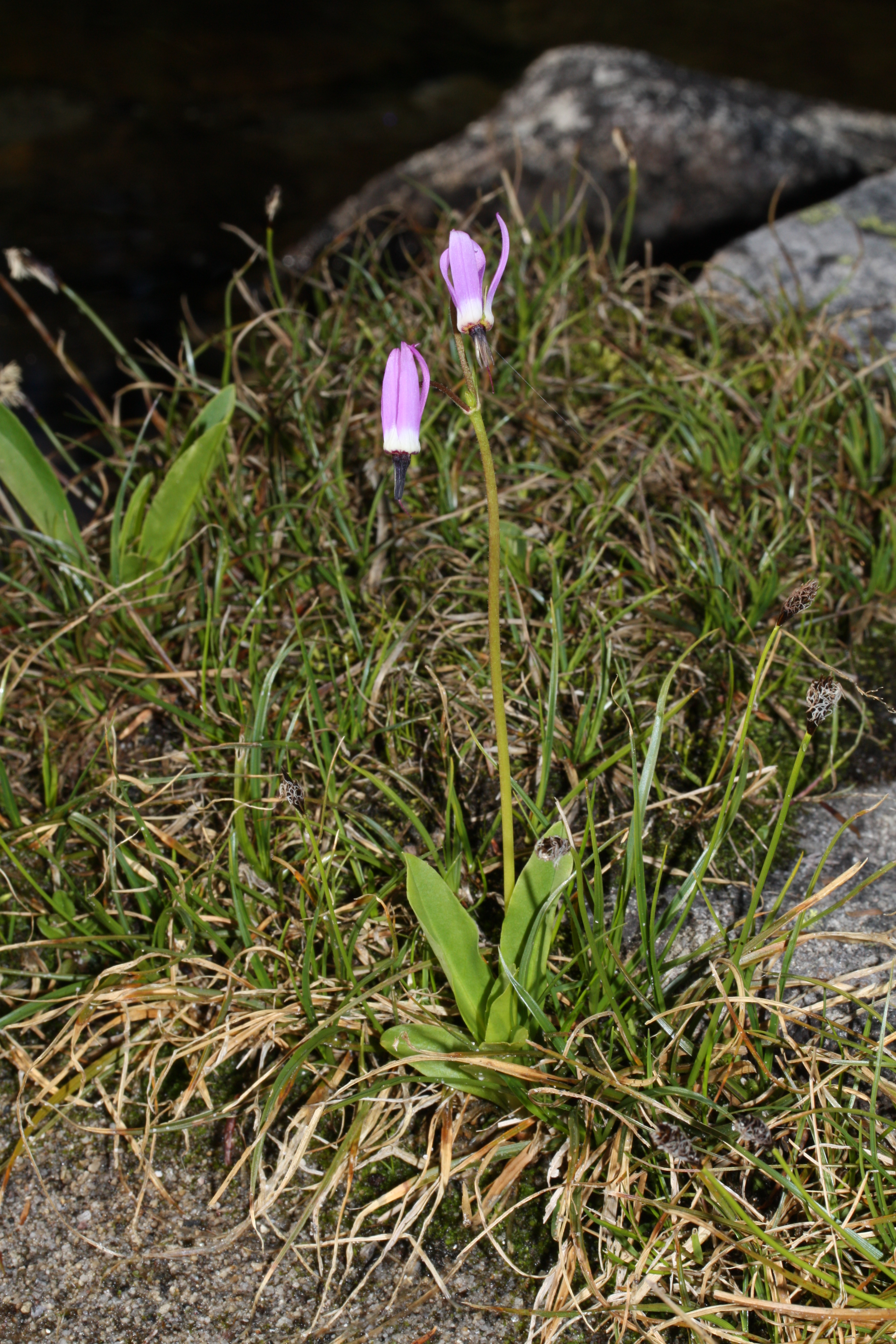
Primula jeffreyi (Dodecatheon jeffreyi) (Henry M. Jackson Wilderness, Washington)

Carl Linnaeus described the genus Dodecatheon in Species Plantarum in 1753. Dodecatheon could be distinguished by its buzz-pollinated flowers, with reflexed petals and projecting styles and anthers. Repeated molecular phylogenetic studies agreed with morphological and cytological evidence that Dodecatheon was most closely related to one of the subgenera of Primula, P. subgen. Auriculastrum, so that if Dodecatheon is kept separate from Primula, then Primula is not monophyletic. Accordingly, in 2007, Austin R. Mast and James L. Reveal reduced the genus Dodecatheon to Primula sect. Dodecatheon of P. subgen. Auriculastrum, and provided names in Primula for all former Dodecatheon species.

=== Species ===
17 Primula species are placed in Primula section Dodecatheon.

Image	Accepted name	Synonym(s) in Dodecatheon	Common name	Distribution
	Primula austrofrigida	Dodecatheon austrofrigidum	Frigid shootingstar	Coast ranges of Oregon and Washington
	Primula clevelandii	Dodecatheon clevelandii	Padre's shootingstar	California
	Primula conjugens	Dodecatheon conjugens	Bonneville shootingstar	Wyoming to Oregon
	Primula fassettii	Dodecatheon amethystinum	Jewelled shootingstar	Upper Midwest US, Pennsylvania
	Primula fragrans	Dodecatheon redolens	Scented shootingstar	California, Nevada and Utah
	Primula frenchii	Dodecatheon frenchii	French's shootingstar	Southeastern US
	Primula frigida	Dodecatheon frigidum	Western arctic shootingstar	Alaska, NW Canada, Russia
	Primula hendersonii	Dodecatheon hendersonii	Broad-leaved shootingstar	California to Idaho
	Primula jeffreyi	Dodecatheon jeffreyi	Sierra shootingstar	California
	Primula latiloba	Dodecatheon dentatum, Dodecatheon latilobum	White shootingstar	Washington to Idaho
	Primula meadia	Dodecatheon meadia	Mead's shootingstar	Eastern US
	Primula pauciflora	Dodecatheon pauciflorum, Dodecatheon pulchellum	Pretty shooting star, few-flowered shooting star	From Subarctic America to Mexico
	Primula poetica	Dodecatheon poeticum	Poet's shootingstar	Washington, Oregon
	Primula standleyana	Dodecatheon ellisiae	Ellis' shootingstar	Arizona, New Mexico, W Mexico
	Primula subalpina	Dodecatheon subalpinum	Sierran shootingstar	California
	Primula tetrandra	Dodecatheon tetrandum, Dodecatheon alpinum	Alpine shootingstar	California
	Primula utahensis	Dodecatheon utahense	Wasatch shootingstar	Big Cottonwood Canyon, Utah

== Cultivation and uses ==
Several species are found in cultivation, including Primula latiloba (Dodecatheon dentatum), Primula hendersonii (Dodecathon hendersonii) and Primula meadia (Dodecathon meadia).

Species of Primula sect. Dodecathon need good drainage and often dry soils in summer and winter when plants are dormant, in the spring plants like moist soils for best growth. Plants grown in dry soils tend to be smaller and lower growing. Since plants typically go summer dormant, seed raised plants need three or more years of growth before they are large enough to bloom. For some species, if given frequent light fertilization and kept moist, dormancy can be delayed resulting in larger plants after germination and the interval between germination and flowering decreased by a year or two. Another technique to shorten the interval between seed germination and flowering is to place the plants in a cooler after dormancy has set in, in late spring, and after a number of weeks move the plants to a shadehouse in midsummer where new growth will start. The flowers produce seeds via buzz pollination.

They can be propagated by division in winter.

Several varieties of the Pacific Northwest are edible.
