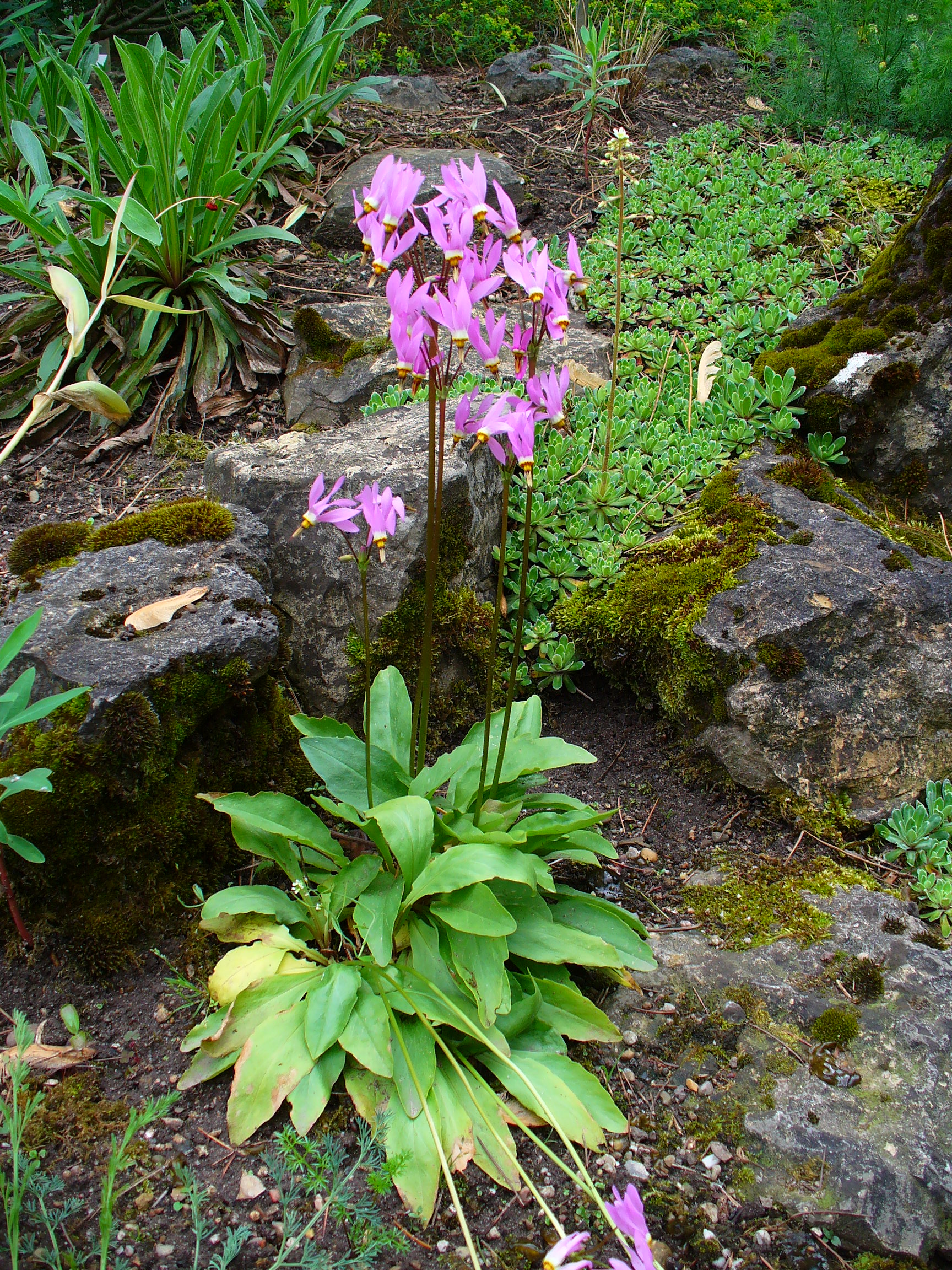

Conservation status
- Secure (NatureServe)

Scientific classification
- Kingdom: Plantae
- Clade: Tracheophytes
- Clade: Angiosperms
- Clade: Eudicots
- Clade: Asterids
- Order: Ericales
- Family: Primulaceae
- Genus: Primula
- Section: Primula sect. Dodecatheon
- Species: P. meadia

Binomial name
- Primula meadia (L.) A.R.Mast & Reveal

Synonyms
- List: Dodecatheon angustifolium Raf.; Dodecatheon brachycarpum Small; Dodecatheon cordatum Raf.; Dodecatheon crenatum Raf.; Dodecatheon cuneatum Raf.; Dodecatheon ellipticum Raf.; Dodecatheon flexuosum Raf.; Dodecatheon hugeri Small; Dodecatheon integrifolium Michx.; Dodecatheon longifolium Raf.; Dodecatheon lutescens C.Z.Nelson; Dodecatheon meadia L.; Dodecatheon obovatum Raf.; Dodecatheon obtusum Raf.; Dodecatheon ovatum Raf.; Dodecatheon parviflorum Raf.; Dodecatheon pauciflorum subsp. eupauciflorum R.Knuth; Dodecatheon pauciflorum var. exquisitum J.F.Macbr. & Payson; Dodecatheon reflexum Salisb.; Dodecatheon serratum Raf.; Dodecatheon stanfieldii Small; Dodecatheon triflorum Raf.; Dodecatheon undatum Raf.; Dodecatheon uniflorum Raf.; Meadia crenata (Raf.) Kuntze; Meadia dodecathea Crantz; Meadia dodecatheon Mill.

= Primula meadia =

Species of flowering plant

Primula meadia (syn. Dodecatheon meadia), known by the common names shooting star, eastern shooting star, American cowslip, roosterheads, and prairie pointers is a species of flowering plant in the primula family Primulaceae. Also, the plant belongs to a group of herbaceous perennials.

== Habitat ==
The Dodecatheon genus that consists of over 12 species is native to North America. Primula meadia is the most widespread species within this genus and can be found in the central and eastern United States. Specifically, the plant grows in areas ranging from southern Wisconsin to western Pennsylvania and southeastern Texas and Georgia.

It has a wide natural habitat, being found in both forests and prairies. It is most often found in calcareous areas.It can be locally common in some areas of its range, however, it can become rare on its geographic edges.

== Description ==
Primula meadia is a perennial, growing to 8–20 in (203–508 mm) high, with flowers that emerge from a basal rosette of leaves (scapose). The petals are reflexed and have a column of anthers that sticks out from the flower. The majority of leaves are either basal or lanceolate. These leaves can possess dimension up to 6" in length and 2.5" in width. The leaves contain smooth margins and an evident central vein that are emerald green and occasionally have a red base. The flowers bloom in the spring (March - Spring) and become dormant towards the end of the summer season. Fruits are displayed in the early summer (May - June) before entering the dormant stage of its perennial life cycle. The flowers point sharply backward, and form a terminal umbel with 8-20 flowers each. The stamens create a cone-like shape in the center of the flower forming a shooting star look, hence a common nickname. Its seeds are dispersed by gusts of wind that shake the erect scapes.

== Morphology ==
This species is geographically widespread, and has considerable morphological variation across its range. Most southern population have white petals, while northern populations have white to pink, lavender, or magenta petals. The petals are fused and the base of these structures can vary in color. Uneven rings appear on the base in white, yellow, or maroon.

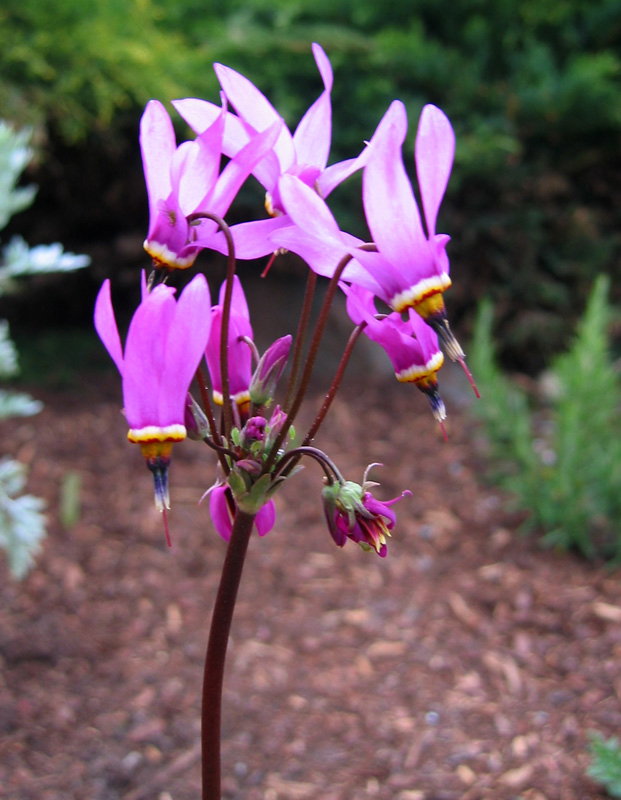
Pink-flowered

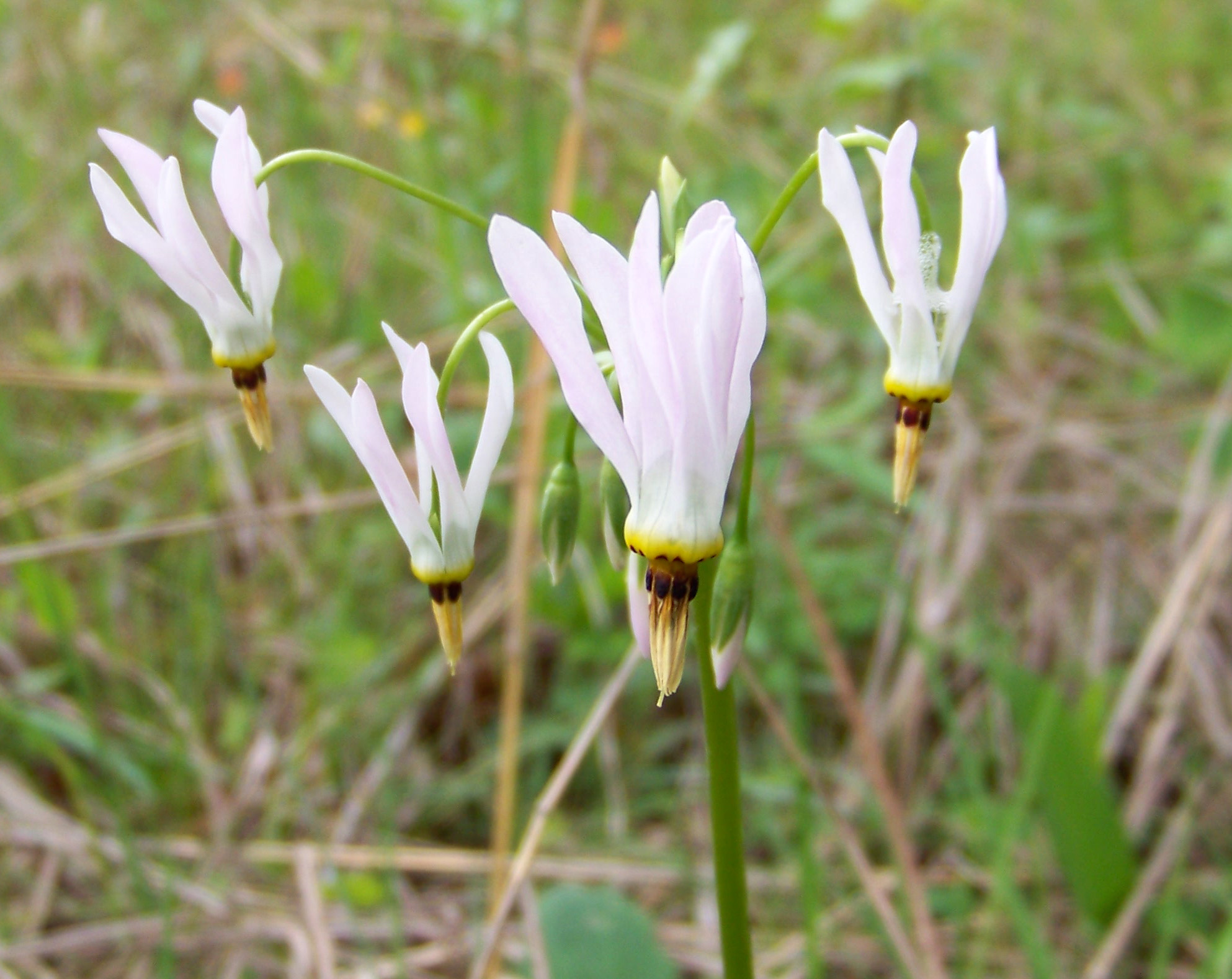
In southeastern regions, petals are typically white.

== Etymology and taxonomy ==
The genus name is derived from the Greek words dodeka which is translated as twelve and theos which is translated as god.

The species transitioned from using the name Dodecatheon meadia to Primula meadia due to genetic evidence found in the phylogenetic history of the plant.

== Pollination ==
The flowers of the Primula meadia are pollinated by bumble bees and other native bees. Honeybees, however, are not characterized as a pollinator because this species produces strictly pollen and not nectar. The pollinators deploy a specialized technique called "buzz pollination" in which the bees vibrate their wings and muscles near the flower's anthers to shake the pollen out. The anthers are unique to the pollinating strategy and are describes as "poricidal" and have small pores at the end rather than a typical split in order to release the pollen.

The shooting star plant relies on insects to disperse their pollen, and ultimately, the seeds within the pollen capsules. The pollen capsules measure from 0.25" - 0.75" and contain very small seeds that are spread through wind dispersal. This pollination technique guarantees that the transfer of pollen is effective and undergoes little-to-no waste of the pollen.

== Cultivation ==
Primula meadia and the white-flowered form P. meadia f. album have both gained the Royal Horticultural Society's Award of Garden Merit.

Primula meadia 'Goliath' is a cultivar that grows large flowers on taller scapes. This species thrives when it is surrounded by plants that are shorter while it is in its early growing stages. Additionally, the shooting star's ideal condition is partial shade, however, it can still grow in cooler zones with sun given that the soil is moist. As far as soil is concerned, this species prefers rocky, sandy soil but is also able to flourish when planted in clay soil. Once the seed is propagated, it will grow at a very slow pace, sometimes taking up to 4 years to bloom.

When treated with fire or brush removal, the shooting star plant benefits. Primula meadia can live in an open habitat given that the effects of potential competing woody vegetation are limited.

== Uses & Toxicity ==
Primula meadia is commonly used as an ornamental plant in gardening practices. This species grows well when it is not obstructed by other flowers and when placed near the front of flower beds. The plant is able to coexist with other species in a woodland garden or in a rock garden. It also shares a habitat well with other native wildflower plants. The shooting star grows best in partially shady areas in a naturalized area. Primula meadia can be characterized as non-invasive because it is able to naturalize without becoming too aggressive.

Primula meadia is not toxic to neither humans nor pets. Additionally, this species is not preferred by deer.
