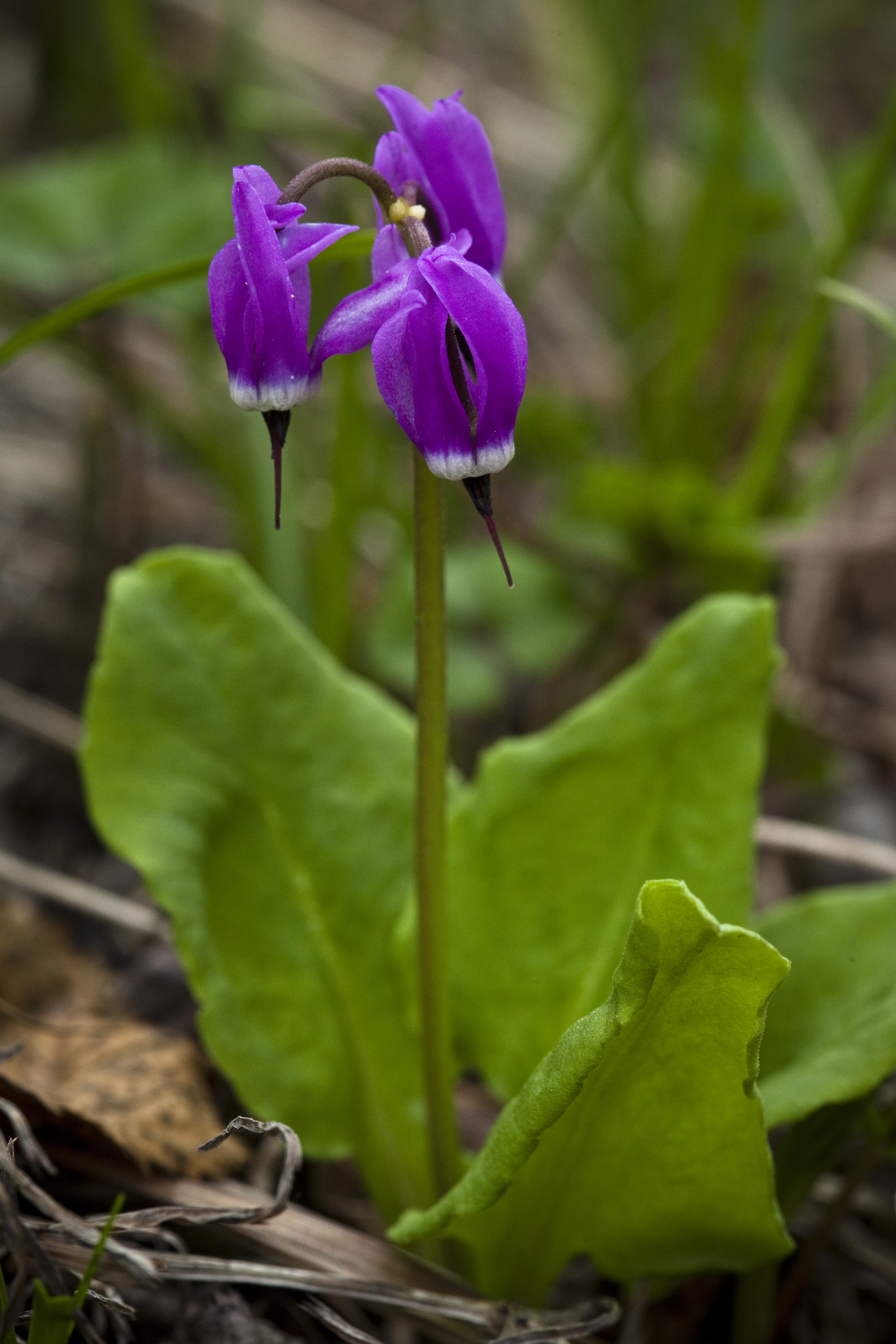

Conservation status
- Secure (NatureServe)

Scientific classification
- Kingdom: Plantae
- Clade: Tracheophytes
- Clade: Angiosperms
- Clade: Eudicots
- Clade: Asterids
- Order: Ericales
- Family: Primulaceae
- Genus: Primula
- Section: Primula sect. Dodecatheon
- Species: P. frigida

Binomial name
- Primula frigida (Cham. & Schltdl.) A.R.Mast & Reveal

Synonyms
- Dodecatheon frigidum Cham. & Schltdl.; Dodecatheon meadia var. frigidum (Cham. & Schltdl.) Hook. f.

= Primula frigida =

Western arctic shootingstar

Species of flowering plant

Primula frigida, synonym Dodecatheon frigidum, commonly called the western arctic shootingstar, is a plant species found in arctic and subarctic regions in the northwestern part of North America and in Asiatic Russia.

== Description ==
Primula frigida is an herbaceous perennial up to 410 millimetres (16 in) tall, spreading by means of underground rhizomes. Each shoot produces 2-7 flowers, usually pink to magenta with a white center.

== Distribution ==
It is common across much of Alaska, and has also been reported from Yukon, Northwest Territories, British Columbia, northern Saskatchewan, and on the Chukotsk Peninsula in the Russian Far East (often erroneously regarded as part of Siberia). It is usually found in moist areas such as bogs, lakeshores, riverbanks, moist meadows, and heathcliff tundras. It can found on melting snow on or near permafrost.
