= Primula frenchii =

Scientific classification
- Kingdom: Plantae
- Clade: Tracheophytes
- Clade: Angiosperms
- Clade: Eudicots
- Clade: Asterids
- Order: Ericales
- Family: Primulaceae
- Genus: Primula
- Section: Primula sect. Dodecatheon
- Species: P. frenchii

Binomial name
- Primula frenchii (Vasey) A.R.Mast & Reveal

Synonyms
- Dodecatheon frenchii (Vasey) Rydb.; Dodecatheon meadia var. frenchii Vasey; Dodecatheon meadia subsp. membranaceum R.Knuth

Species of flowering plant

Photo taken at the Auburn Museum of Natural History. For additional information, please contact The John D. Freeman Herbarium.

Primula frenchii, French's shootingstar, is a species of flowering plant in the family Primulaceae. It is native to central and southern United States, and it grows in moist, shady areas, such as ledges near streams and under sandstone cliffs.

It was originally described as Dodecatheon meadia var. frenchii Vasey in 1891, elevated to species in 1932, then moved to the genus Primula in 2007. The plant is named after George Hazen French, who discovered it in 1871.

== Species Description ==
Primula frenchii is commonly said to have an appearance closely resembling that of Primula media, which is a spring wildflower, blooming from late April to June. Both P. media and P. frenchii have a unique appearance. P. frenchii flowers’ downward hanging form, each with 5 petals that seem to shoot upward, away from the flowers’ tip, allot their nickname, French’s shooting star. The flowers give off a color that is most commonly white in appearance; they may also appear to be a pale lavender or magenta color, though such is rare. P. frenchii also have a yellowish color surrounding their flowers’ downward pointing tip, which is also often ringed with a wavy area of black or maroon color. The plant most typically inhabits a range of 2-15 flowers sprung from tall green stems that do not themselves inhabit leaves, but are surrounded by a basal rosette. The basal rosette is a large cluster of roughly ten oval-shaped green leaves which lie close to the ground at the base of P. frenchii.

== Habitat and Distribution ==
Primula frenchii is native to Colbert County, Alabama but is also found throughout the Midwest in states such as Missouri, Arkansas, Illinois, Indiana, and Kentucky. Within these states, they primarily inhabit shady, moist areas, such as stone overhangs or sandstone cliffs. They use these spaces to protect themselves from extreme weather conditions.

While Primula frenchii explicitly inhabits the Midwest, there are additional forms of Primula that can be found in Pennsylvania. These forms are called P. Meadia and P. fassettii. Like Primula frenchii, they reside in protected areas: facing north on bluffs in the Susquehanna River watershed and in upland forests in the Potomac watershed, respectively.

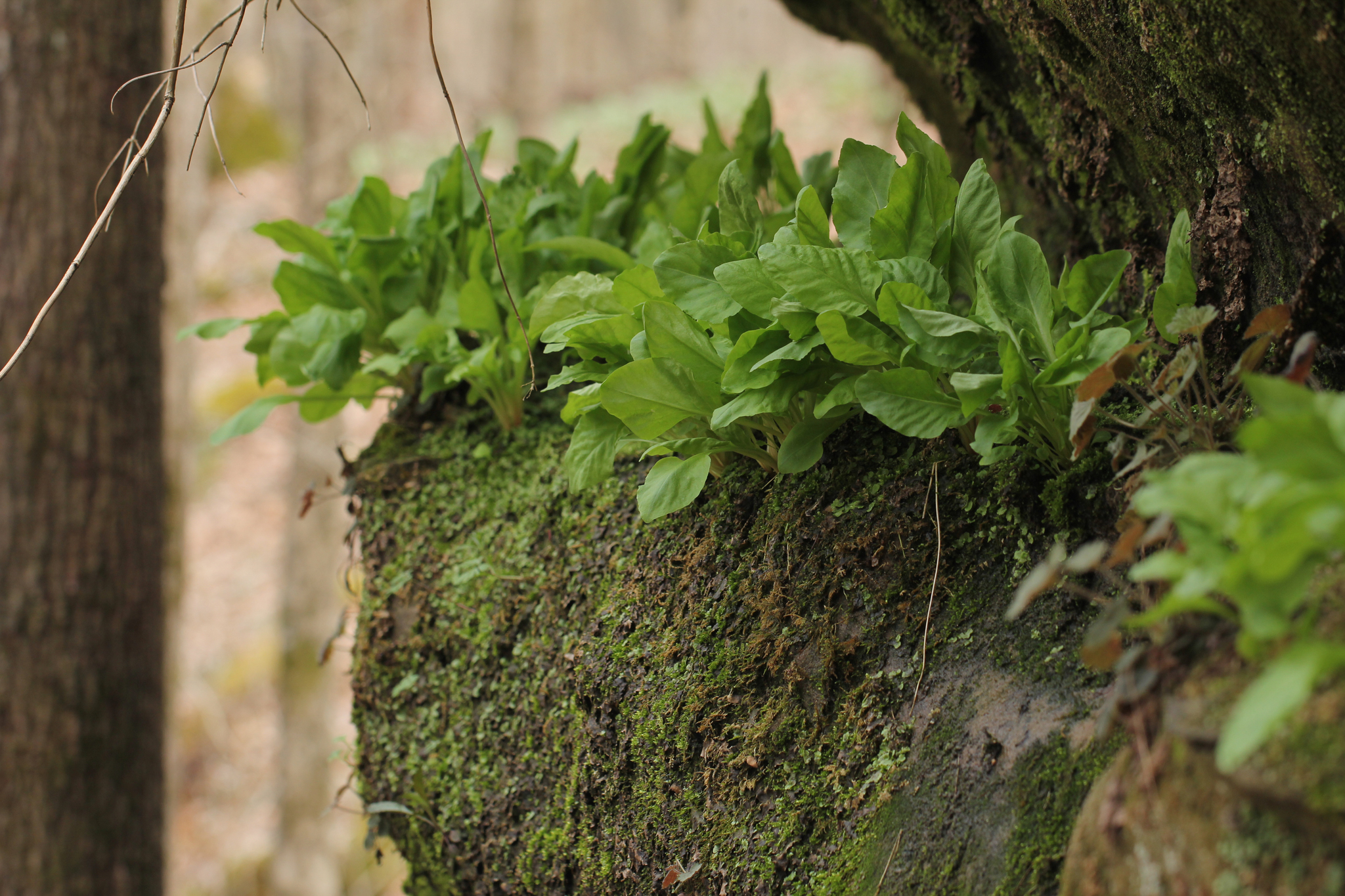
Growing on an outcrop ledge in Pope County, Illinois

== Phylogenetics ==
Primula frenchii belongs to the shooting-star lineage and was formerly known in the genus Dedocatheon. Phylogenetic studies using chloroplast and nuclear DNA revealed that Dodecatheon evolved from the Primula lineage. Although shooting-star species have distinct flower shapes, similarities in their morphology and cytology support their relationship with other primroses. As a result, Dodecatheon frenchii was reclassified as Primula frenchii in 2007 and placed in Primula section Dodecatheon. The species shares a common ancestor with other primroses in the family Primulaceae and is closely related to Primula meadia, another shooting-star species.

== Reproduction ==
Like most flowering plants, this is a buzz-pollinated species. These plants produce valvate capsules, another name for Dehiscence, along their leaves, releasing the flower’s seeds. Due to recombination, the heterostyly supergene is altered, but corrected in later populations. These flowers then go on to produce “anthers and stigma are both high in the corolla tube and pollen is large."

== Adaptations ==
Monomorphism occurs in a population when the entirety of the population shares the same uniform phenotype or allele for a given trait. One way monomorphism occurs is due to the recessive alleles being overridden during reproduction, leading to a single version of the Primula Frenchii - Mast et al. The “pin” monomorphy is due to changes within the heterostyly supergene and fixation of recessive genes during reproduction, leading to few adaptations within the species.

== Uses ==
While Primula frenchii fail to play a prominent role in modern medicine, they supplement the visual appeal of garden landscapes. They also offer ecological benefits due to their large amounts of pollen, enabling bees to utilize their nectar as an energy source.

== Threats ==
Several factors may impede the proliferation of Primula frenchii. This species favors moist, shaded cliffside environments. Global warming thus endangers Primula frenchii by causing an increase in atmospheric temperatures, which disrupts cooler climates. Since cooler environments provide preferable conditions for the growth of this plant, global warming poses a detrimental threat to plant reproduction. Rocky terrain is a limited natural resource, so this species faces pre-existing geographical issues that, combined with manmade threats, further restricts their growth and dispersal. For instance, lumber companies remove a source of shade for the plants by cutting down trees, subjecting the plants to excessive sunlight. Their habitats function as archaeological excavation sites, specifically in Kentucky, which contributes to soil erosion. Use of these habitats for recreational purposes represents yet another threat to their growth; these habitats serve as rock-climbing paths and off-roading trails, which cause soil compaction and thus limited access to nutrients for the plants. In addition to urban development of their rocky habitats, Primula frenchii are susceptible to trampling by humans and animals, such as deer, which makes them more prone to extinction.

=== Legal Status ===
Primula frenchii reside most abundantly in Illinois, Kentucky, Indiana, Missouri, Arkansas, and Alabama. They are deemed the S3, or vulnerable, state conservation status in Illinois, Indiana, and Kentucky. In Arkansas, they belong to the S2, or imperiled, state conservation status. In both Missouri and Alabama, they are considered critically imperiled, as they belong to the S1 state conservation status.
