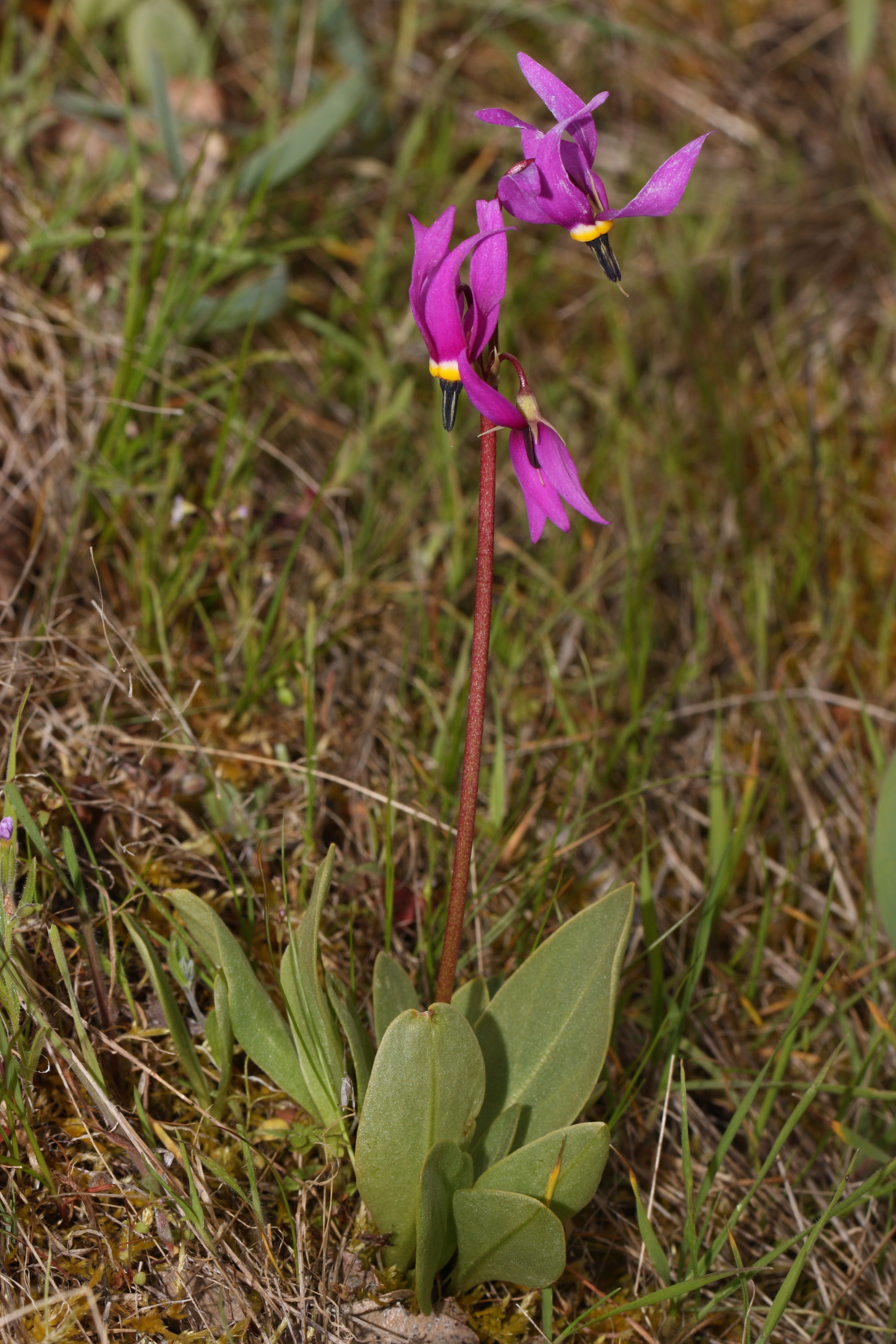

Scientific classification
- Kingdom: Plantae
- Clade: Embryophytes
- Clade: Tracheophytes
- Clade: Angiosperms
- Clade: Eudicots
- Clade: Asterids
- Order: Ericales
- Family: Primulaceae
- Genus: Primula
- Section: Primula sect. Dodecatheon
- Species: P. conjugens

Binomial name
- Primula conjugens (Greene) A.R.Mast & Reveal

Synonyms
- Dodecatheon conjugens Greene

= Primula conjugens =

Species of flowering plant

Primula conjugens, synonym Dodecatheon conjugens, is a species of flowering perennial plant in the primrose family, known by the common name Bonneville shooting star.

== Description ==
Primula conjugens is a thick-rooted perennial with narrow oval-shaped leaves around the base.

It erects slim, tall stems which are dark in color and are topped with inflorescences of one to seven showy flowers. The bloom period is April to July.

Each flower nods with its mouth pointed to the ground when new, and becomes more erect with age. It has five reflexed sepals in shades of magenta (or, rarely, white) which lie back against the body of the flower. At the base of the sepals is a ring of bright yellow. From the corolla mouth protrude large dark red or black anthers surrounding a threadlike pink stigma.

The fruit is circumscissile.

The plant is of special value to native bumble bee species. Historically, it was consumed by Native Americans, and may still suffice to prevent starvation.

== Distribution and habitat ==
The perennial wildflower is native to western North America from northeastern California, the Great Basin, and Pacific Northwest; east to Wyoming and Montana (U.S.) and across western Canada to Saskatchewan.

It grows in seasonally wet areas of habitats including: sagebrush steppe and sagebrush scrub, yellow pine forest, wetland-riparian zones, and moist slopes and meadows of mountains. It is found at elevations of 200–1,900 metres (660–6,230 ft).
