= Primula utahensis =

Conservation status
- Imperiled (NatureServe)

Scientific classification
- Kingdom: Plantae
- Clade: Tracheophytes
- Clade: Angiosperms
- Clade: Eudicots
- Clade: Asterids
- Order: Ericales
- Family: Primulaceae
- Genus: Primula
- Section: Primula sect. Dodecatheon
- Species: P. utahensis

Binomial name
- Primula utahensis (N.H.Holmgren) A.R.Mast & Reveal

Synonyms
- Dodecatheon dentatum subsp. utahense (N.H.Holmgren) Kartesz; Dodecatheon dentatum var. utahense N.H.Holmgren; Dodecatheon utahense (N.H.Holmgren) Reveal

Species of flowering plant

Primula utahensis, synonym Dodecatheon utahense, is a species of flowering plant in the family Primulaceae, native to Utah. It was first described by Noel Holmgren in 1994 as Dodecatheon dentatum var. utahense. In 2006, it was raised to a separate species as Dodecatheon utahense. When Dodecatheon was sunk into Primula in 2007, it was transferred to that genus as Primula utahensis.
