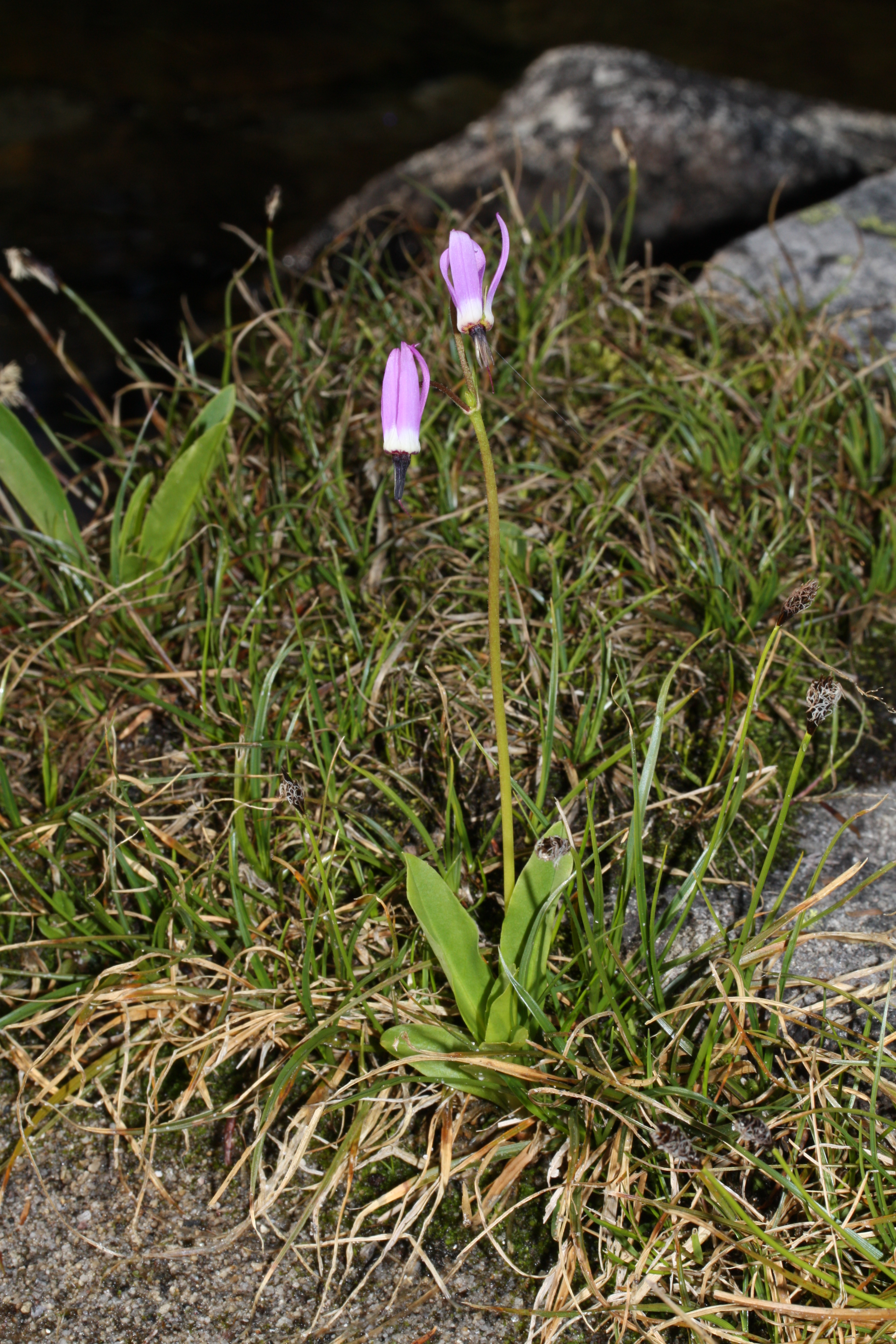
- In Henry M. Jackson Wilderness

Conservation status
- Secure (NatureServe)

Scientific classification
- Kingdom: Plantae
- Clade: Tracheophytes
- Clade: Angiosperms
- Clade: Eudicots
- Clade: Asterids
- Order: Ericales
- Family: Primulaceae
- Genus: Primula
- Section: Primula sect. Dodecatheon
- Species: P. jeffreyi

Binomial name
- Primula jeffreyi (Van Houtte) A.R.Mast & Reveal

Synonyms
- Dodecatheon crenatum Greene; Dodecatheon dispar A.Nelson; Dodecatheon exilifolium J.F.Macbr. & Payson; Dodecatheon glandulosum Eastw.; Dodecatheon jeffreyanum K.Koch; Dodecatheon jeffreyi Van Houtte; Dodecatheon jeffreyi var. odoratum Eastw.; Dodecatheon jeffreyi subsp. pygmaeum (H.M.Hall) H.J.Thomps.; Dodecatheon jeffreyi var. typica R.Knuth; Dodecatheon jeffreyi var. vivaparum (Greene) Abrams; Dodecatheon meadia var. jeffreyi (Van Houtte) K.Brandegee; Dodecatheon meadia var. lancifolium A.Gray; Dodecatheon viviparum Greene; Meadia jeffreyi (Van Houtte) Kuntze

= Primula jeffreyi =

Species of flowering plant

Primula jeffreyi, synonym Dodecatheon jeffreyi, is a North American species of flowering plant in the primrose family known by the common names Sierra shooting star, Jeffrey's shooting star, and tall mountain shooting star.

== Description ==
It is a thick-rooted perennial with long, slightly wrinkled leaves around the base. It erects slim, tall, hairy stems which are dark in color and are topped with inflorescences of 3 to 18 showy flowers. Each flower nods, with its pointed center aimed at the ground when fresh, and becomes more erect with age. It has four or five reflexed sepals in shades of pink, lavender, or white which lie back against the body of the flower. Each sepal base has a blotch of bright yellow. From the corolla mouth protrude large dark anthers surrounding a threadlike stigma.

== Etymology ==
The specific epithet jeffreyi is in honor of botanist John Jeffrey.

== Distribution and habitat ==
This wildflower is native to western North America from California to Alaska to Montana, where it grows in mountain meadows and streambanks.

== In culture ==
The flowers of this species were considered good luck by the Nlaka'pamux people, who used them as amulets and love charms.
