= Primula standleyana =

Scientific classification
- Kingdom: Plantae
- Clade: Tracheophytes
- Clade: Angiosperms
- Clade: Eudicots
- Clade: Asterids
- Order: Ericales
- Family: Primulaceae
- Genus: Primula
- Section: Primula sect. Dodecatheon
- Species: P. standleyana

Binomial name
- Primula standleyana A.R.Mast & Reveal

Synonyms
- Dodecatheon dentatum subsp. ellisiae (Standl.) H.J.Thomps.; Dodecatheon dentatum var. ellisiae (Standl.) N.H.Holmgren; Dodecatheon ellisiae Standl.

Species of flowering plant

Primula standleyana, synonym Dodecatheon ellisiae, is a species of flowering plant in the family Primulaceae, native to Arizona, New Mexico and Northeast Mexico. It was first described by Paul Carpenter Standley in 1913 as Dodecatheon ellisiae. When the genus Dodecatheon was reduced to Primula sect. Dodecatheon following molecular phylogenetic studies, the species could not be transferred to Primula as Primula ellisiae, as that name had already been used for a different species (now regarded as a synonym of Primula rusbyi). Accordingly, the replacement name Primula standleyana was provided.
