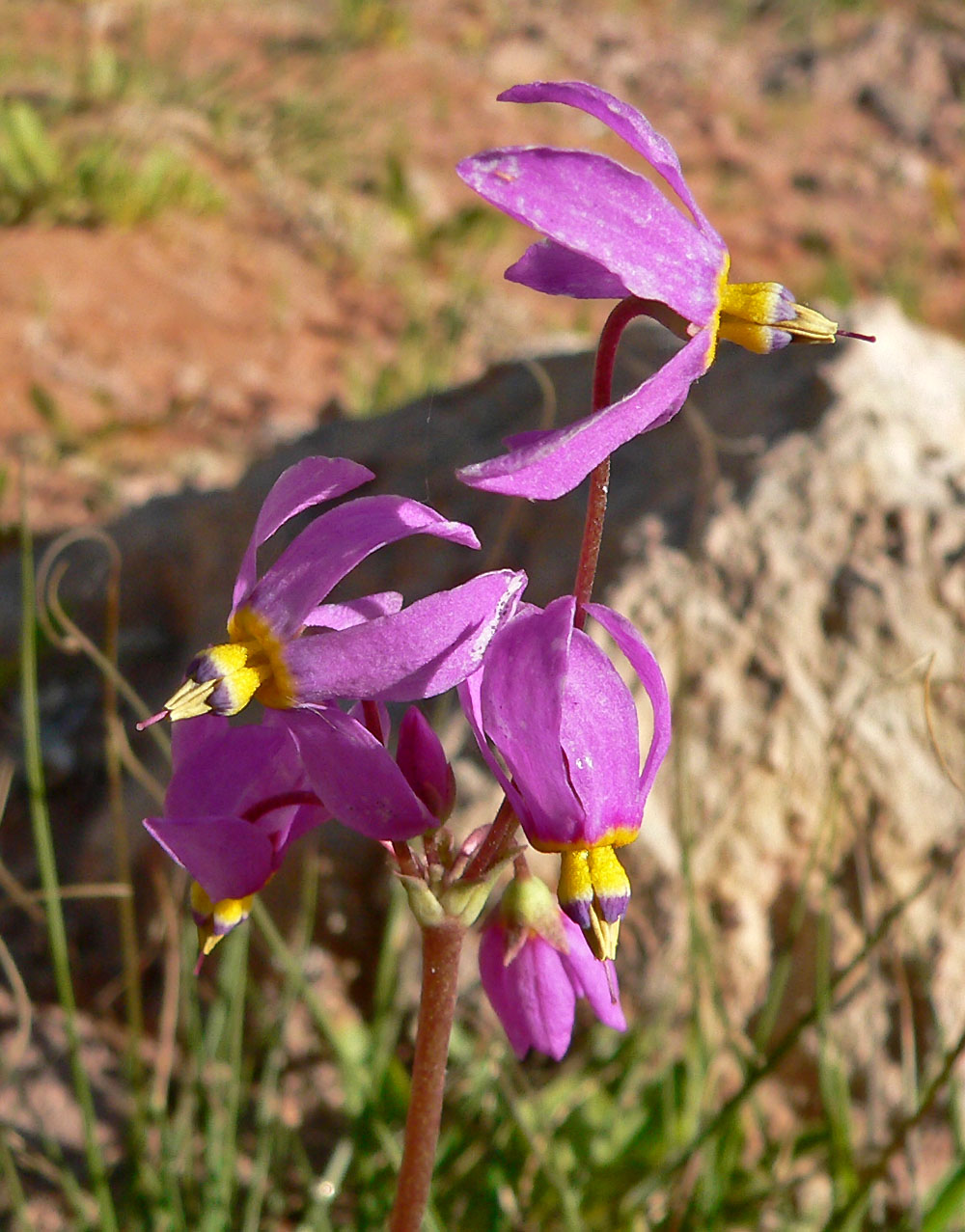

Scientific classification
- Kingdom: Plantae
- Clade: Tracheophytes
- Clade: Angiosperms
- Clade: Eudicots
- Clade: Asterids
- Order: Ericales
- Family: Primulaceae
- Genus: Primula
- Section: Primula sect. Dodecatheon
- Species: P. pauciflora

Binomial name
- Primula pauciflora (Durand) A.R.Mast & Reveal

Synonyms
- According to Plants of the World Online: Dodecatheon meadia var. pauciflorum Durand; Dodecatheon pauciflorum (Durand) Greene; Dodecatheon pulchellum subsp. pauciflorum (Durand) Hultén; Meadia pauciflora (Durand) Kuntze; According to the Jepson eFlora: Dodecatheon pulchellum (Raf.) Merr.; Dodecatheon pulchellum subsp. monanthum (Greene ex R.Knuth) H.J.Thomps. ex Munz, ined.; Dodecatheon pulchellum var. monanthum (Greene) B.Boivin; Dodecatheon pulchellum var. shoshonense (A.Nelson) Reveal; Primula pauciflora var. macrocarpa (A.Gray) Mast & Reveal; Primula pauciflora var. monantha (Greene) Mast & Reveal; Primula pauciflora var. shoshonensis (A. Nelson) Mast & Reveal

= Primula pauciflora =

Species of flowering plant

Primula pauciflora, the pretty shooting star, few-flowered shooting star, dark throat shooting star or prairie shooting star, is a species of flowering plant in the primula family Primulaceae. It is a widespread and very variable species, native to western North America, from Subarctic America to Mexico, often in xeric (extremely dry) and desert habitats. It is found in the Great Basin Deserts and Mojave Desert. Its synonyms include Dodecatheon pauciflorum and Dodecatheon pulchellum.

== Description ==
Primula pauciflora is a widespread and highly variable polyploid complex (2n = 44, 88 and 132). The species is generally hairless, with a flowering stem 10–40 cm (4–16 in) tall. The inflorescence is made up of between 2 and fifteen flowers. The flower generally has 9–14 mm (0.4–0.6 in) long petals, magenta to lavender in color.

Primula pauciflora has been divided into up to seven varieties each with their own often complex set of synonyms. Primula pauciflora var. pauciflora, synonym Dodecatheon pulchellum, is a herbaceous perennial with single, leafless flower stems, growing from very short erect root stocks with no bulblets. It grows to a height of 5–40 cm (2.0–15.7 in). Its leaves are basal, 2–15 cm long, blades oblong-lanceolate to oblanceolate, mostly entire to somewhat small-toothed, narrowed gradually to winged stalks nearly as long. Each plant has between 1 and 25 flowers clustered at the stem top. The calyx is usually purple-flecked, and the five lobes are 3 to 5 millimeters long. The corolla is 10 to 20 millimeters long, the 5 lobes swept backwards, purplish-lavender, seldom white, the short tube yellowish, usually with a purplish wavy line at the base. The filaments are joined into a yellowish tube 1.5–3 mm long, which is smooth or only slightly wrinkled. The 5 anthers are joined to a projecting point, usually yellowish to reddish-purple, 4–7 mm long. The stigma is slightly larger than the style. This plant flowers between April and August. The fruits are capsules, many-seeded, ovoid-cylindric, hairless to glandular-hairy, membranous to firm-walled, 5–15 mm long, opening from the tip into sharp teeth.

== Varieties ==
As of April 2022, Plants of the World Online accepted seven varieties (distributions from the same source):

- Primula pauciflora var. cusickii (Greene) A.R.Mast & Reveal – British Columbia, Idaho, Montana, Oregon, Washington State, Wyoming
- Primula pauciflora var. distola (Reveal) A.R.Mast & Reveal – South Dakota, Wyoming
- Primula pauciflora var. macrocarpa (A.Gray) A.R.Mast & Reveal – Alaska, British Columbia, California, Oregon, Washington State
- Primula pauciflora var. monantha (Greene) A.R.Mast & Reveal – California, Oregon, Utah, Washington State
- Primula pauciflora var. pauciflora – widespread from subarctic America to Mexico
- Primula pauciflora var. shoshonensis (A.Nelson) A.R.Mast & Reveal – California, Idaho, Nevada, Oregon, Utah
- Primula pauciflora var. zionensis (Eastw.) A.R.Mast & Reveal – Arizona, Colorado, Utah

== Cultivation ==
Under the name Dodecatheon pulchellum, the plant has gained the Royal Horticultural Society's Award of Garden Merit. If not provided adequate moisture in the growing season they will die back to the roots, but will return in the next year. In cultivation it is hardy down to −15 °C (5 °F), but prefers a sheltered location in partial or full shade with neutral or acid soil, such as a woodland setting. Though they need moisture, the pretty shooting-star also requires good drainage, not a boggy or riparian situation. When grown in good conditions the crown will become much larger with multiple blooming stems. Larger plants can be successfully divided for propagation in the late fall.
