= Bog garden =

Garden with permanently moist soil

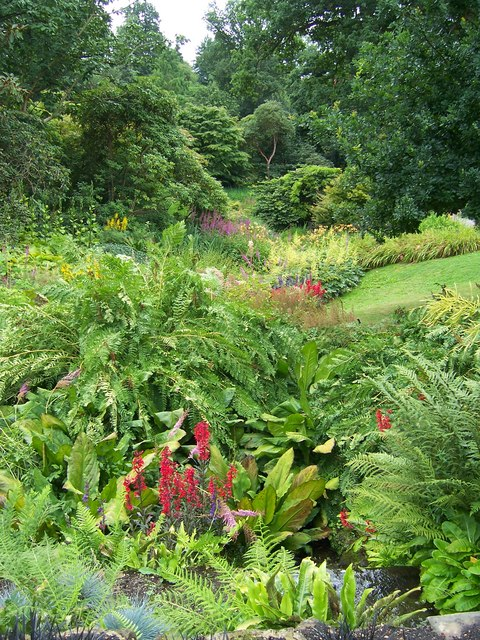
Wakehurst Place Bog garden

A bog garden is a type of garden that employs permanently moist (but not waterlogged) soil to create a habitat for plants and creatures which thrive in such conditions. It may exploit existing poor drainage in the garden, or it may be artificially created using pond liners or other materials to trap water in the area. Any such structure must allow a small amount of seepage to prevent the water stagnating. For instance, a pond liner must be pierced a few times. Typically a bog garden consists of a shallow area adjoining a pond or other water feature, but care must be taken to prevent water draining from a higher to a lower level. The minimum sustainable depth is 40–45 cm (16–18 in). Good drainage is provided by gravel placed over the liner, and the bog can be kept watered by using a perforated hose below the surface.

Plants which enjoy boggy soil or shallow water around their roots (marginals) include:

- Butomus umbellatus (flowering rush)
- Caltha palustris (marsh marigold)
- Dionaea muscipula (Venus flytrap)
- Drosera (sundews)
- Iris pseudacorus (yellow flag)
- Lobelia cardinalis
- Lysimachia nummularia (creeping jenny)
- Menyanthes trifoliata (bogbean)
- Myosotis scorpioides (water forget-me-not)
- Osmunda regalis (royal fern)
- Persicaria amplexicaulis (red bistort)
- Persicaria bistorta (bistort)
- Pinguicula (butterworts)
- Primula pulverulenta (candelabra primula)
- Sarracenia (North American pitcher plants)
- Schoenoplectus tabernaemontani 'Zebrinus' (striped rush)
- Scrophularia auriculata 'Variegata' (water figwort)
- Trollius × cultorum (globeflower)
- Utricularia (bladderworts)

== See also ==
- Garden pond
- Water garden
- List of garden types
