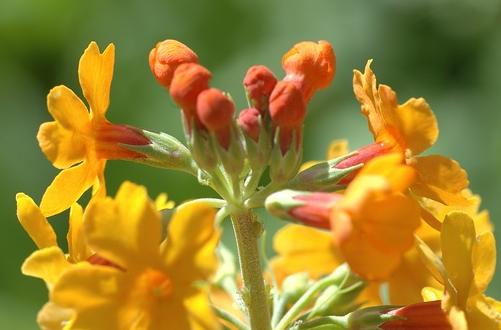
- Primula bulleyana

Scientific classification
- Kingdom: Plantae
- Clade: Embryophytes
- Clade: Tracheophytes
- Clade: Spermatophytes
- Clade: Angiosperms
- Clade: Eudicots
- Clade: Asterids
- Order: Ericales
- Family: Primulaceae
- Genus: Primula
- Section: Primula sect. Proliferae; Pax

Species
- See text.

= Candelabra primula =

Group of flowering plants

The name candelabra primula or candelabra primrose refers to species and cultivars of Primula section Proliferae (formerly Candelabra), originating mainly in the far east. They are characterised by whorls of flowers formed in circles at intervals around strong vertical stems, in many brilliant colours, flowering over a long period from Spring to Summer. They are popular ornamental subjects for moist, heavy, neutral or acidic soil. They associate well with other plants, such as rhododendrons, which enjoy similar conditions.

- Primula aurantiaca
- Primula bulleyana (including Primula beesiana)
- Primula burmanica
- Primula chungensis
- Primula cockburniana
- Primula cooperi
- Primula japonica
- Primula mallophylla
- Primula melanodonta
- Primula miyabeana
- Primula poissonii
- Primula polonensis
- Primula prenantha
- Primula prolifera (including Primula helodoxa)
- Primula pulverulenta
- Primula secundiflora
- Primula serratifolia
- Primula stenodonta
- Primula wilsonii
