= Garden pond =

Water feature in gardens

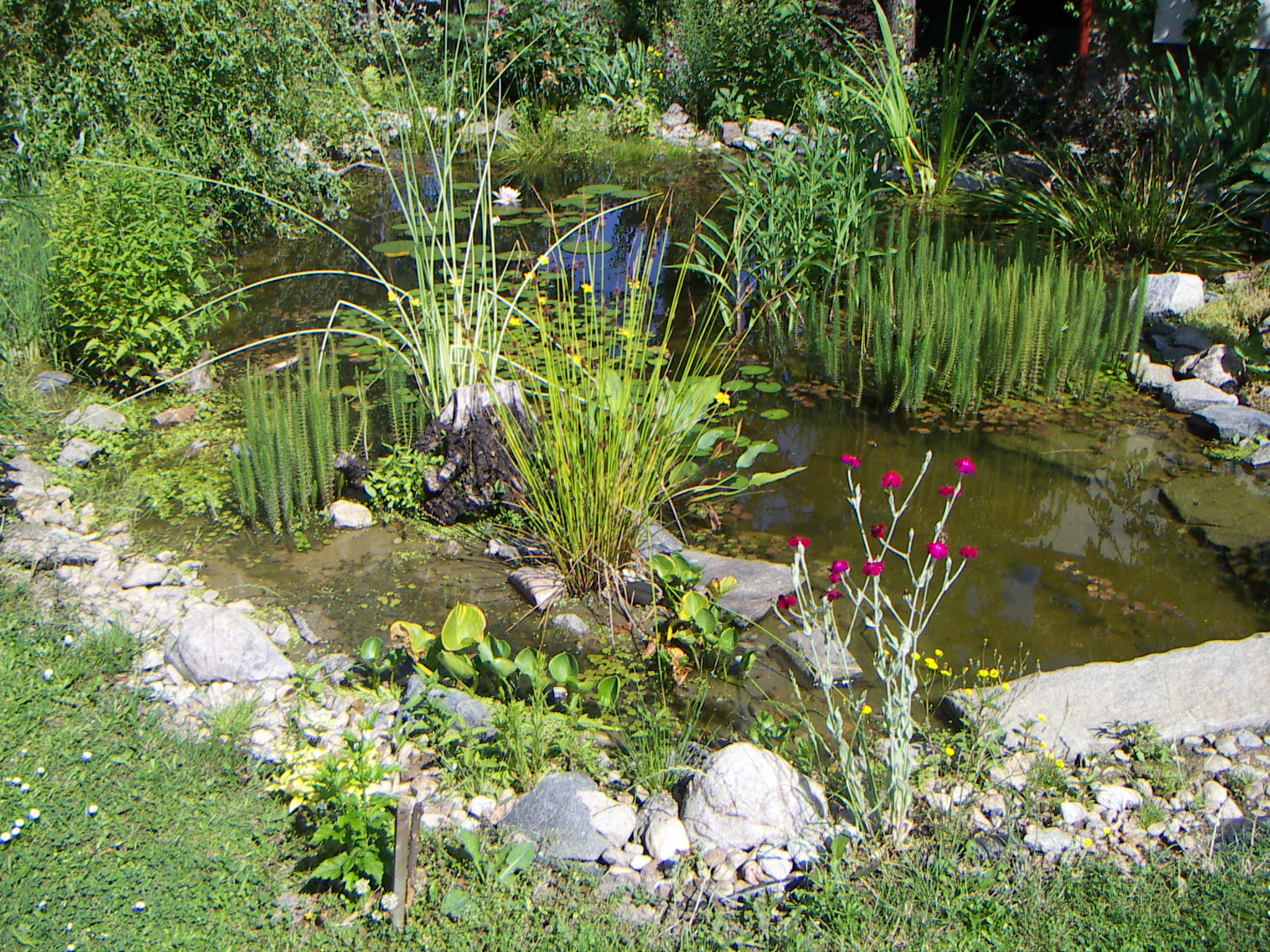
Garden pond

A garden pond is a water feature constructed in a water garden or designed landscape, normally for aesthetic purposes, to provide wildlife habitat, or for swimming.

== Habitat ==
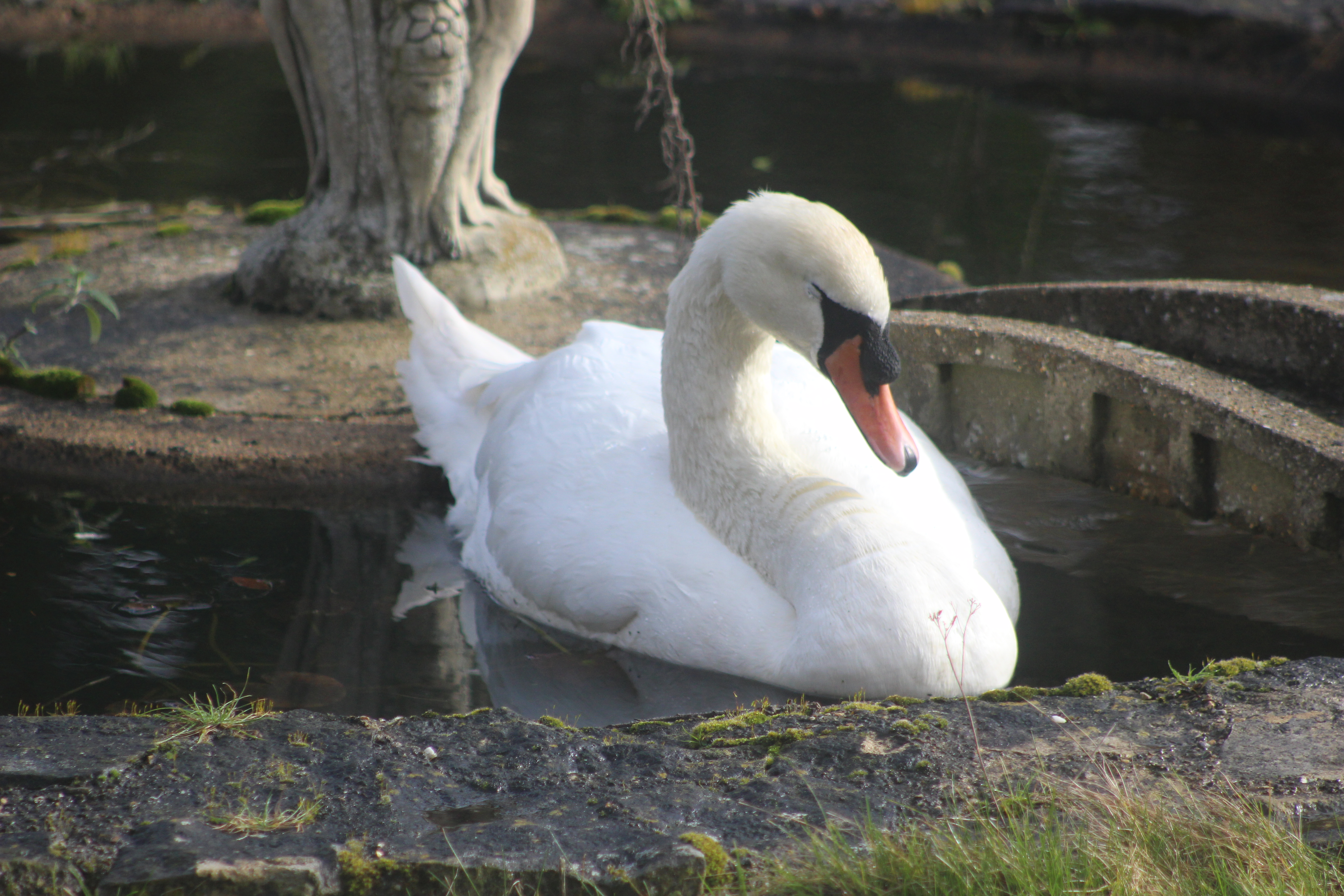
On occasion, even large waterbirds may visit garden ponds, such as this mute swan (Cygnus olor).

Garden ponds can be excellent wildlife habitats and may contribute to the protection of freshwater wildlife. Invertebrate animals (such as dragonflies and water beetles) and insectivorous vertebrates such as amphibians (frogs and toads), turtles and waterbirds can colonize new ponds quickly. Ornamental fishes are also frequently stocked in larger ponds to provide aesthetics and algae control, as well as pest control against mosquito larvae infestation.

Garden pond owners have the potential to make many original and valuable observations about the ecology of small waterbodies, which garden ponds replicate.

== Problems ==
There are several problems that can result from garden ponds. In particular, they can be pathways for the spread of invasive plants. In the UK, the invasive species Crassula helmsii and Myriophyllum aquaticum have both escaped from garden ponds. These plants cause considerable practical problems in protecting freshwater.

Amphibious species such as frogs, toads, and newts are common in garden ponds, especially in overgrown areas with algae and reeds. Without proper precautions being taken by pond owners, such areas can harbour excessive frogspawn and may pose a challenge.

Cases of high rodent activity are also common in garden ponds, with field mice, rats, and voles taking refuge in freshwater areas such as garden ponds. Consuming pondwater contaminated with rat urine can cause infections such as Weil's disease or leptospirosis.

In tropical climates, garden ponds may become breeding sites for mosquitoes and increase the spread of diseases carried by these insects.

== Conditions ==
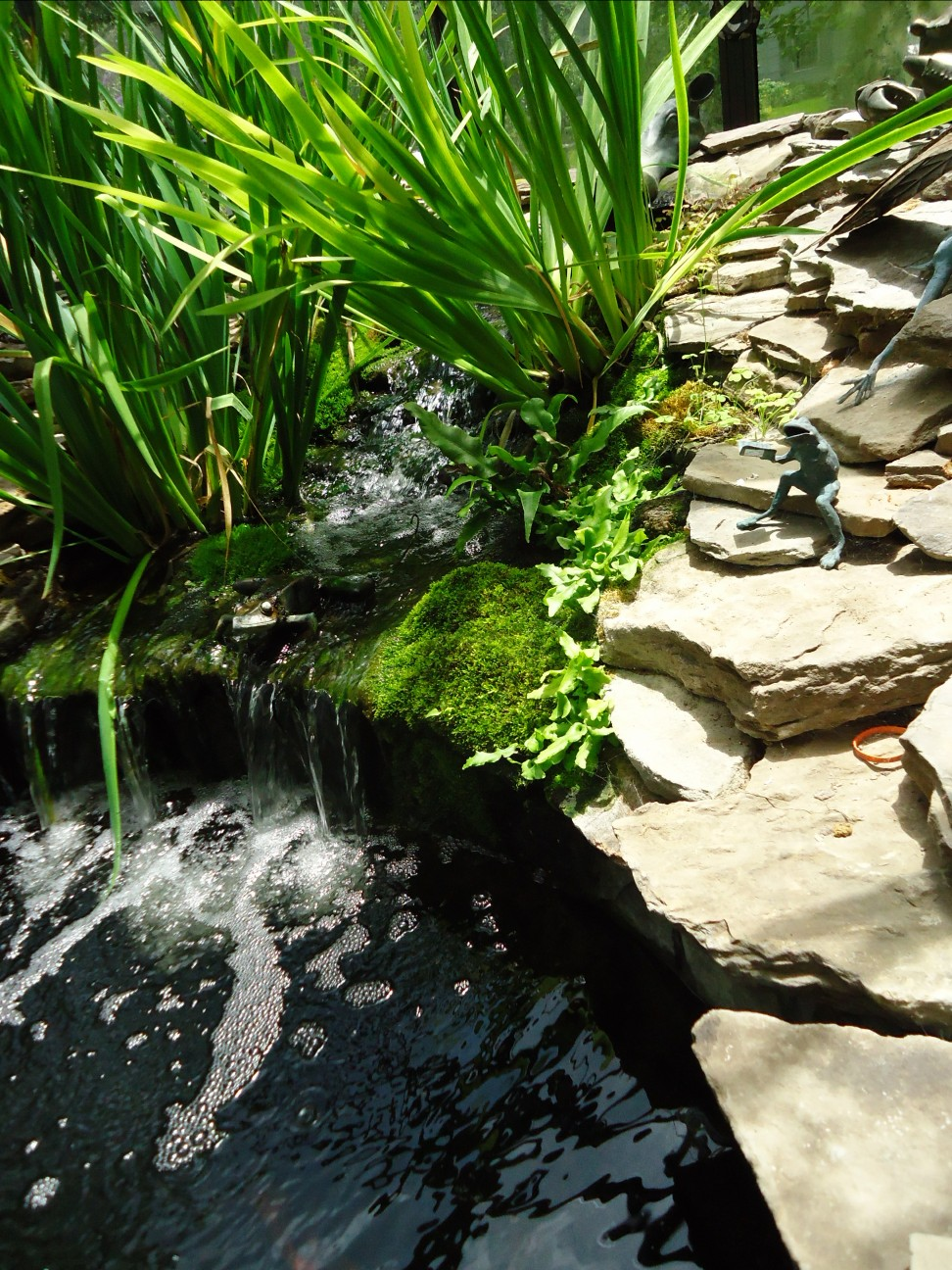
This garden pond has two ponds separated by a waterfall with a one-foot drop; generally, the fish in the upper pond are smaller, and ones in the lower pond are larger.

Ponds may be created by natural processes or by people; however, the origin of the hole in the ground makes little difference to the kind of wildlife that will be found in the pond. Much more important is whether the pond is polluted or clean, how close it is to other wetlands and its depth, particularly whether it dries out from time to time and how many fish (if any) there are.

Naturally, ponds vary more in their physical and chemical conditions from day to day than other freshwater, like rivers. People often install pumps in garden ponds to counter these natural tendencies, particularly to maintain higher levels of dissolved oxygen. Although this is generally unnecessary for wildlife, it may be essential to keep fish in a garden pond. For ponds with polluted nutrient-rich tapwater added to them, filters can be used to reduce the abundance of algae.

== Water supply and loss ==
Ponds outside of gardens are fed by four main water sources: rain, inflows (springs and streams), surface runoff, and groundwater. The wildlife value of ponds is greatly affected by the extent to which these water sources are unpolluted. Garden ponds are generally not fed by inflows or groundwater, except in the larger and rural gardens. Usually, the pond will be filled by a combination of tap water, rainwater, and surface runoff – and lost to evaporation.

In soils that lack natural clay, additional water loss to drainage and permeation is prevented by a liner. Pond liners are PVC or EPDM foils that are placed between the soil of the pond bed and the water. Liners can also be made from puddled clay, and ponds on free-draining soils can even be self-sealing with fine sediments washed into the pond.

=== Seasonal ponds ===
Ponds tend to dry out if excessive water is lost to evaporation. Evaporation is more common in the summer season, when increases in temperature and lack of rainfall contribute to dry conditions, creating seasonal ponds (or vernal pools) that usually dry out once a year. These seasonal ponds provide specialized habitat for many plant and animal species, particularly amphibians and invertebrates. Oftentimes, seasonal ponds are utilized as a breeding ground, allowing amphibian (such as frogs and toads) and invertebrate (such as fairy shrimp) larvae space to develop without aquatic predators like fish.

== Swimming ponds, natural pools or natural ponds ==
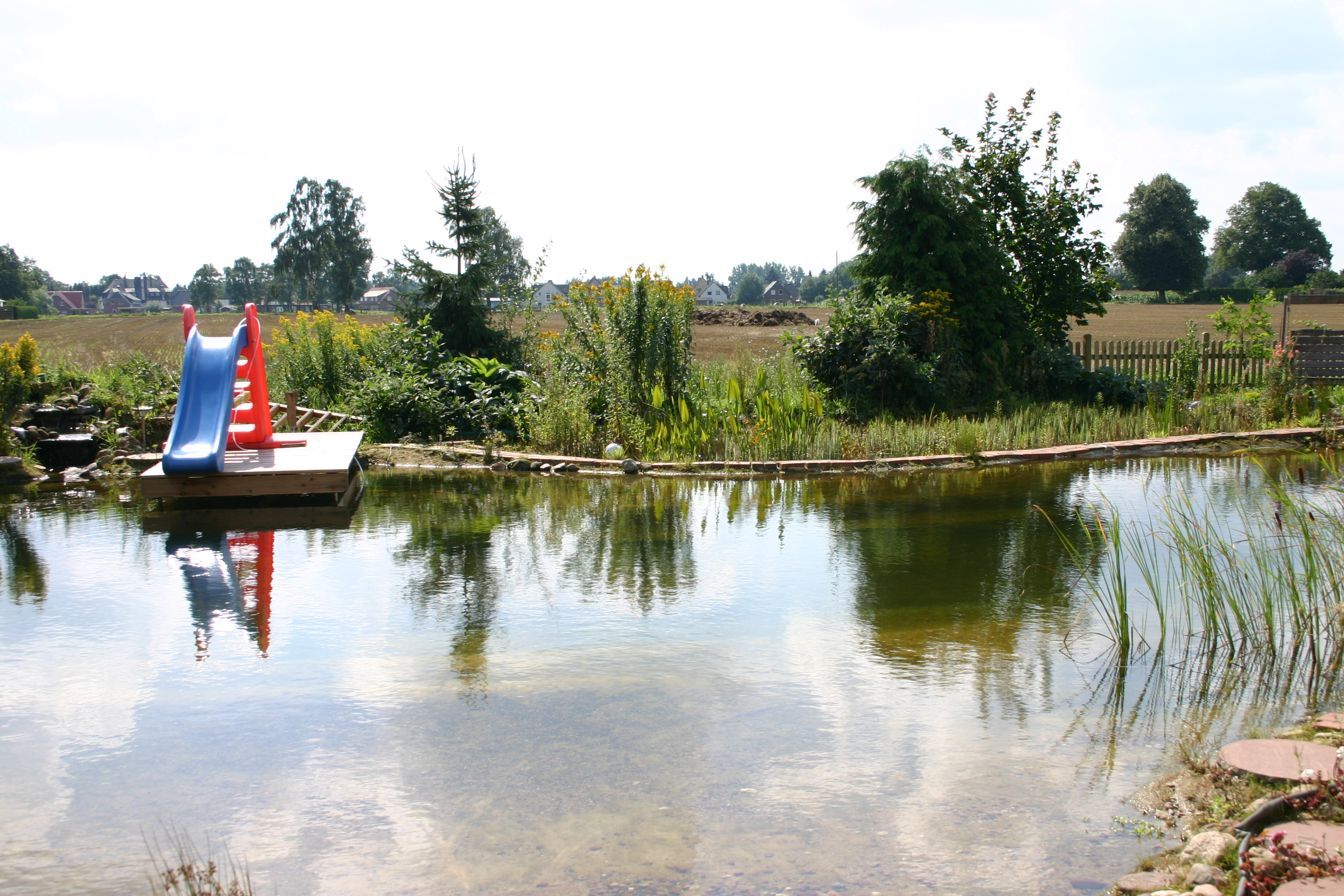
This German swimming pond highlights how natural swimming pools can be designed to resemble a part of the surrounding environment.

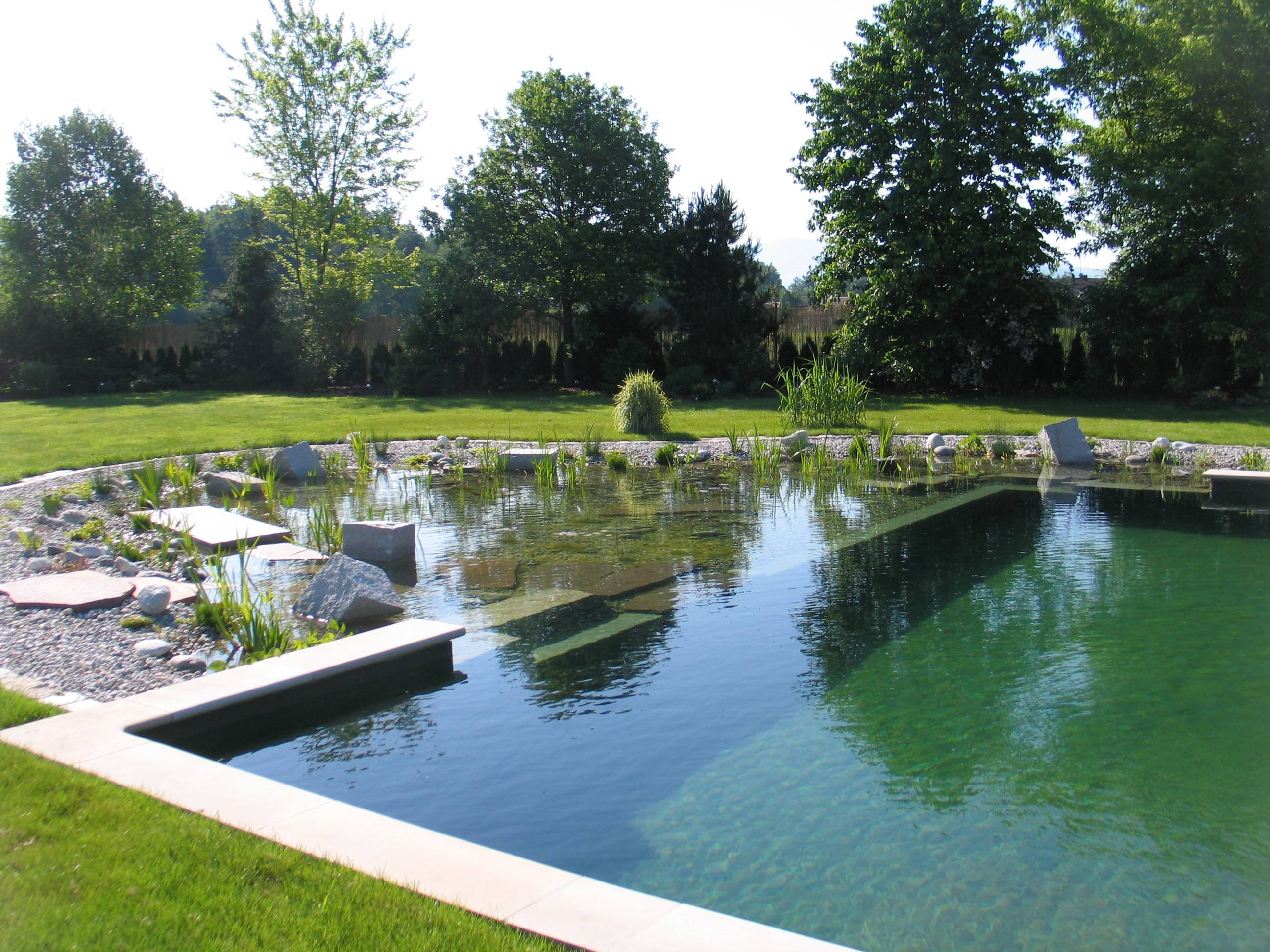
The traditional coping on this natural swimming pool demonstrates that natural swimming pools can be designed in many ways and do not always have to resemble natural bodies of water.

Swimming ponds can be constructed with an isolating membrane or membranes or (on an organic model sometimes called natural swimming pools) contained by a layer of loam. For all variants, no chemicals or devices disinfect or maintain water; the water is instead cleared through the use of biological filters, aquatic plants, or other organisms used in water purification (zooplankton).

The first such pools were built in the early 1980s in Austria, where they are known as "Schwimmteiche". The first was built by Werner Gamerith and Richard Weixler in Gamerith's private garden in the 1980s. The market slowly grew, and by 2016 there were around 20,000 such swimming ponds in Europe.

The first public swimming pool in North America built and maintained in this way was finished at Webber Park in Minneapolis in 2015.

An organization called the International Organization for Natural Bathing Waters (IOB) sets the guidelines for such pools.

== See also ==
- Biotope
- Koi pond
- Water garden
- Ocean pool
