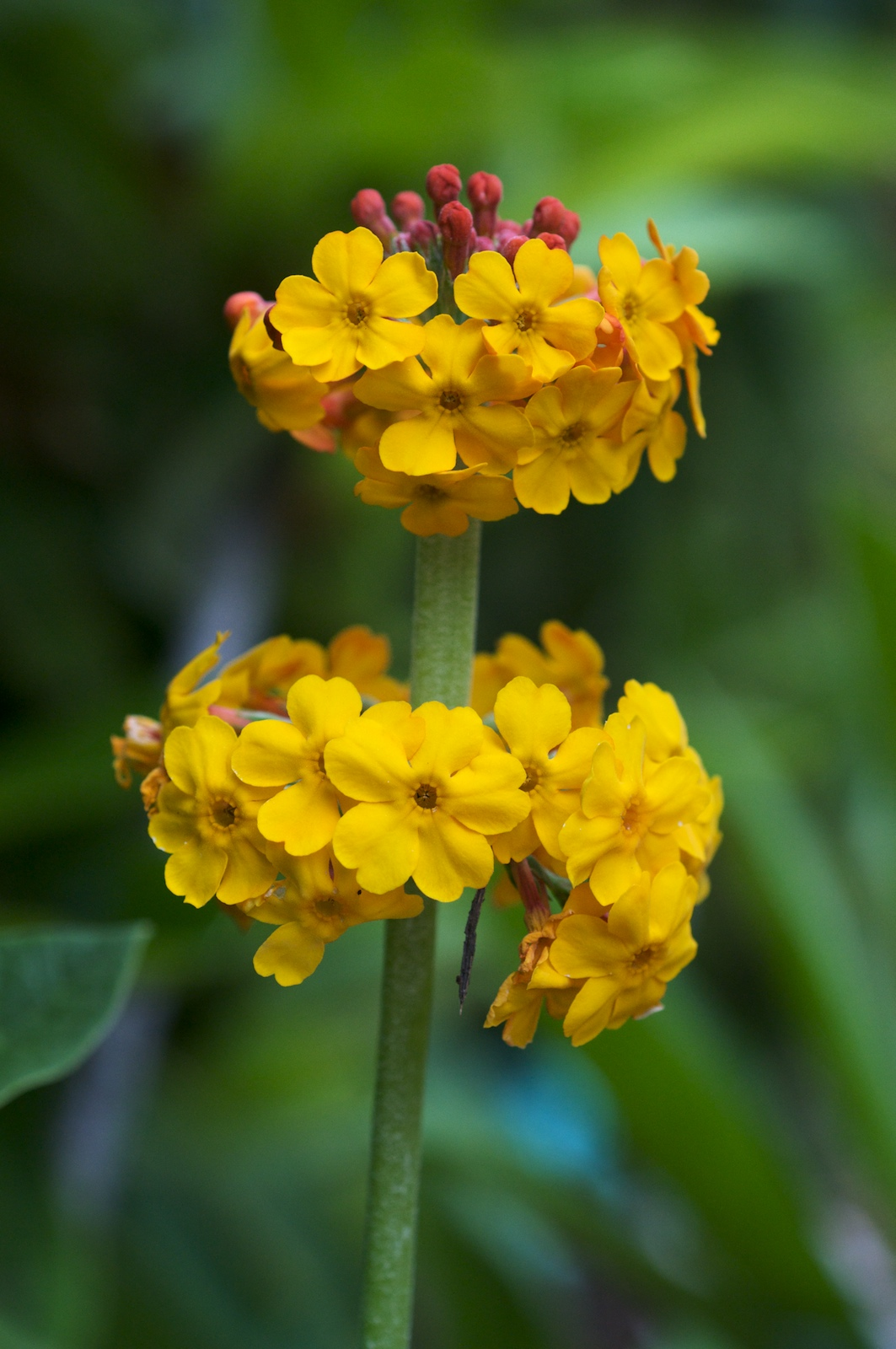

Scientific classification
- Kingdom: Plantae
- Clade: Embryophytes
- Clade: Tracheophytes
- Clade: Spermatophytes
- Clade: Angiosperms
- Clade: Eudicots
- Clade: Asterids
- Order: Ericales
- Family: Primulaceae
- Genus: Primula
- Species: P. bulleyana

Binomial name
- Primula bulleyana Forrest

Synonyms
- Aleuritia bulleyana (Forrest) Soják

= Primula bulleyana =

Species of flowering plant

Primula bulleyana is a species of flowering plant in the family Primulaceae, native to hillsides in China.

== Description ==
Primula bulleyana is one of a group known as candelabra primulas, so called because of the tiered arrangement of their flowers. It is a semi-evergreen perennial. The sturdy, erect flowering stems appear in summer and are 50–60 centimetres (20–24 in) long, rising in groups from a rosette of leaves 12–35 centimetres (4.7–13.8 in) long and 3–10 centimetres (1.2–3.9 in) broad. The whorls of multiple orange-yellow flowers, opening from red buds, are arranged in tiers. It thrives in a bright, moist environment, such as beside a pond.

This plant has gained the Royal Horticultural Society's Award of Garden Merit.

== History ==
It was first introduced by George Forrest from Yunnan province, China, in 1906, and named after Arthur K Bulley, his first sponsor, who was a cotton broker from Liverpool and a keen amateur gardener. He founded the Bees Ltd. nursery and was responsible for the introduction of many hardy plants and alpines to Britain in the early 20th century.

== Subspecies ==
The plant formerly known as Primula beesiana (Bee's primrose) is now regarded as a synonym of P. bulleyana subsp. beesiana (Forrest) A.J.Richards. It is similar in size and form to the type subspecies, but has purple blooms. It is likewise a recipient of the RHS award.
