= Water garden =

Garden with water as a main feature

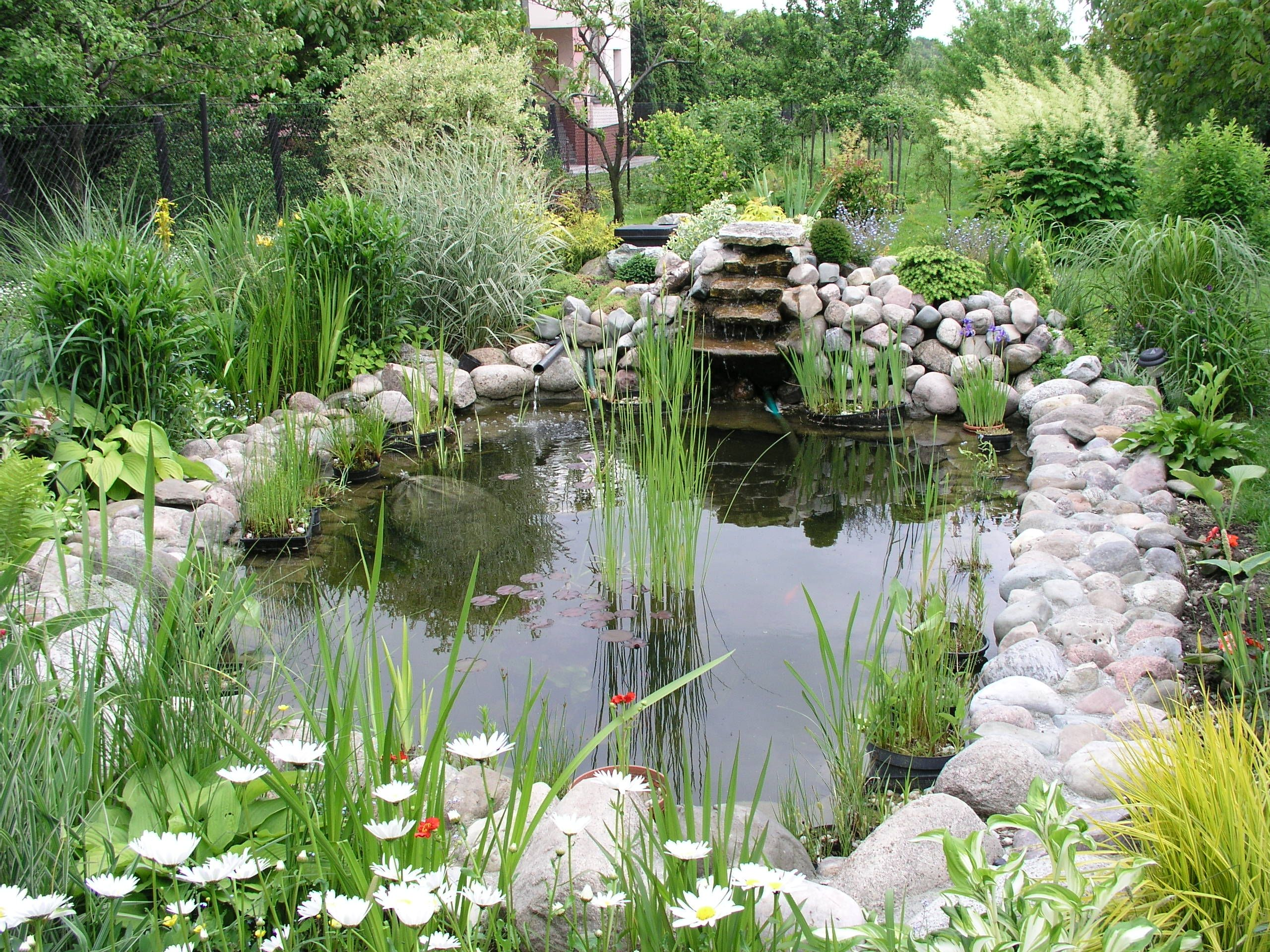
A small pond or water garden in a private residence

Water garden or aquatic garden, is a term sometimes used for gardens, or parts of gardens, where any type of water feature (particularly garden ponds) is a principal or dominant element. The primary focus is on plants, but they will sometimes also house waterfowl, or ornamental fish, in which case it may be called a fish pond. They vary enormously in size and style.

Water gardening is gardening that is concerned with growing plants adapted to lakes, rivers and ponds, often specifically to their shallow margins. Although water gardens can be almost any size or depth, they are often small and relatively shallow, perhaps less than twenty inches (51 cm) in depth. This is because most aquatic plants are depth sensitive and require a specific water depth in order to thrive; this can be helped by planting them in baskets raised off the bottom. A water garden may include a bog garden for plants that enjoy a waterlogged soil. Sometimes their primary purpose is to grow a particular species or group of aquatic plants, for example water lilies.

== History ==
Water gardens, and water features in general, have been a part of public and private gardens since ancient Persian gardens and Chinese gardens. For instance, the (c. 304) Nanfang Caomu Zhuang records cultivating Chinese spinach on floating gardens. Water features have been present and well represented in every era and in every culture that has included gardens in their landscape and architectural environments. Up until the rise of the industrial age, when the modern water pump was introduced, water was not recirculated but was diverted from rivers and springs into the water garden, from which it exited into agricultural fields or natural watercourses. Historically, water features were used to enable plant and fish production both for food purposes and for ornamental aesthetics.

== Description ==
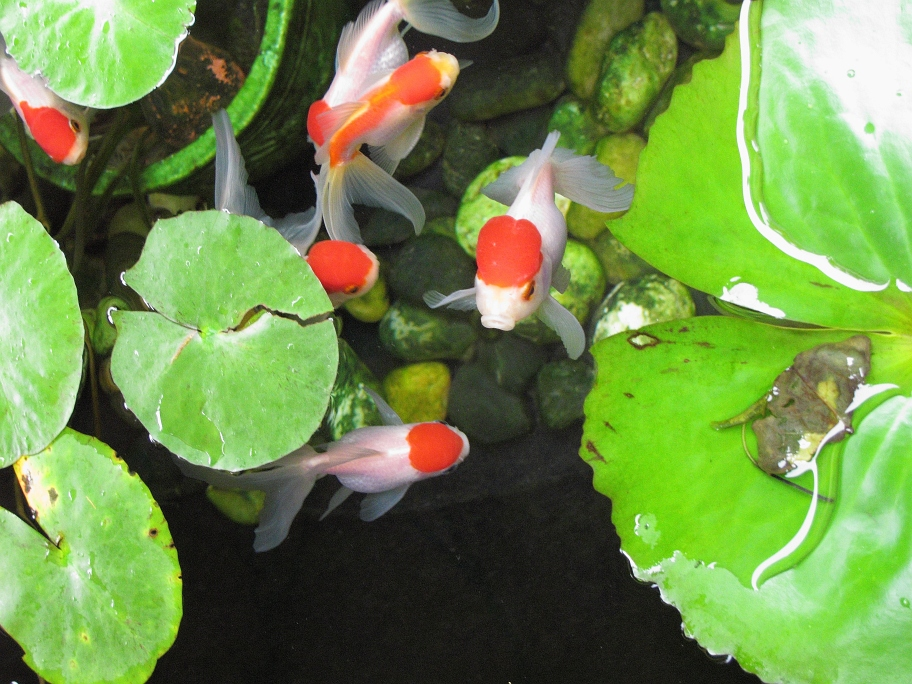
Red Oranda (Wen) goldfish reared in a small outdoor pond with water-lilies.

When the aquatic flora and fauna are balanced, an aquatic ecosystem is created that will support sustainable water quality and clarity. Elements such as fountains, statues, artificial waterfalls, boulders, underwater lighting, lining treatments, edging details, watercourses, and in-water and bankside planting can add visual interest and help to integrate the water garden with the local landscape and environment.

== Water features ==
In landscape architecture and garden design, a water feature is one or more items from a range of fountains, jeux d'eau, pools, ponds, rills, artificial waterfalls, and streams. Modern water features are typically self-contained, meaning that they do not require water to be plumbed in; rather water is recycled from either a pond or a hidden reservoir, also known as a sump.

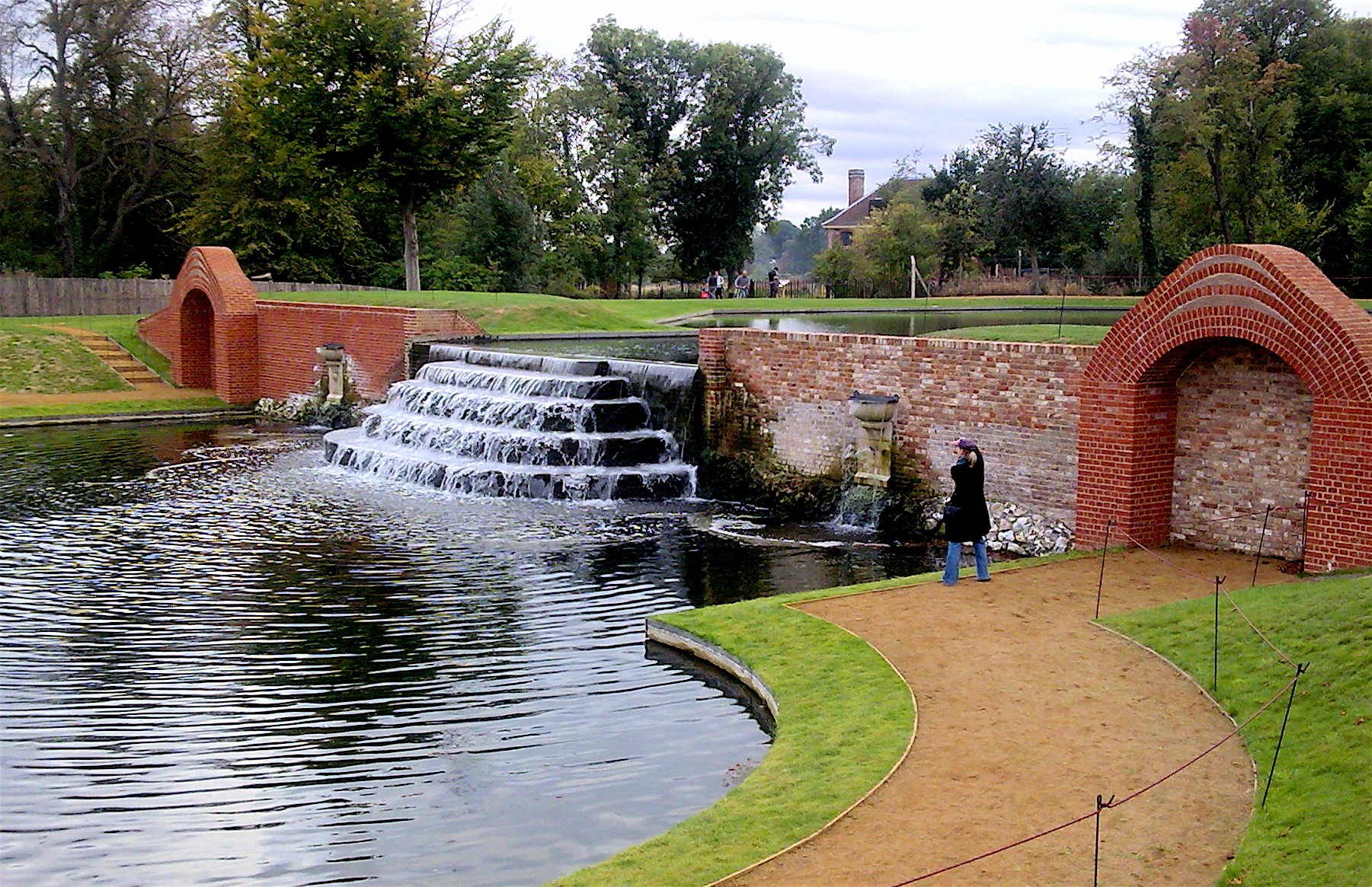
Waterfall and pool in Bushy Park Water Gardens

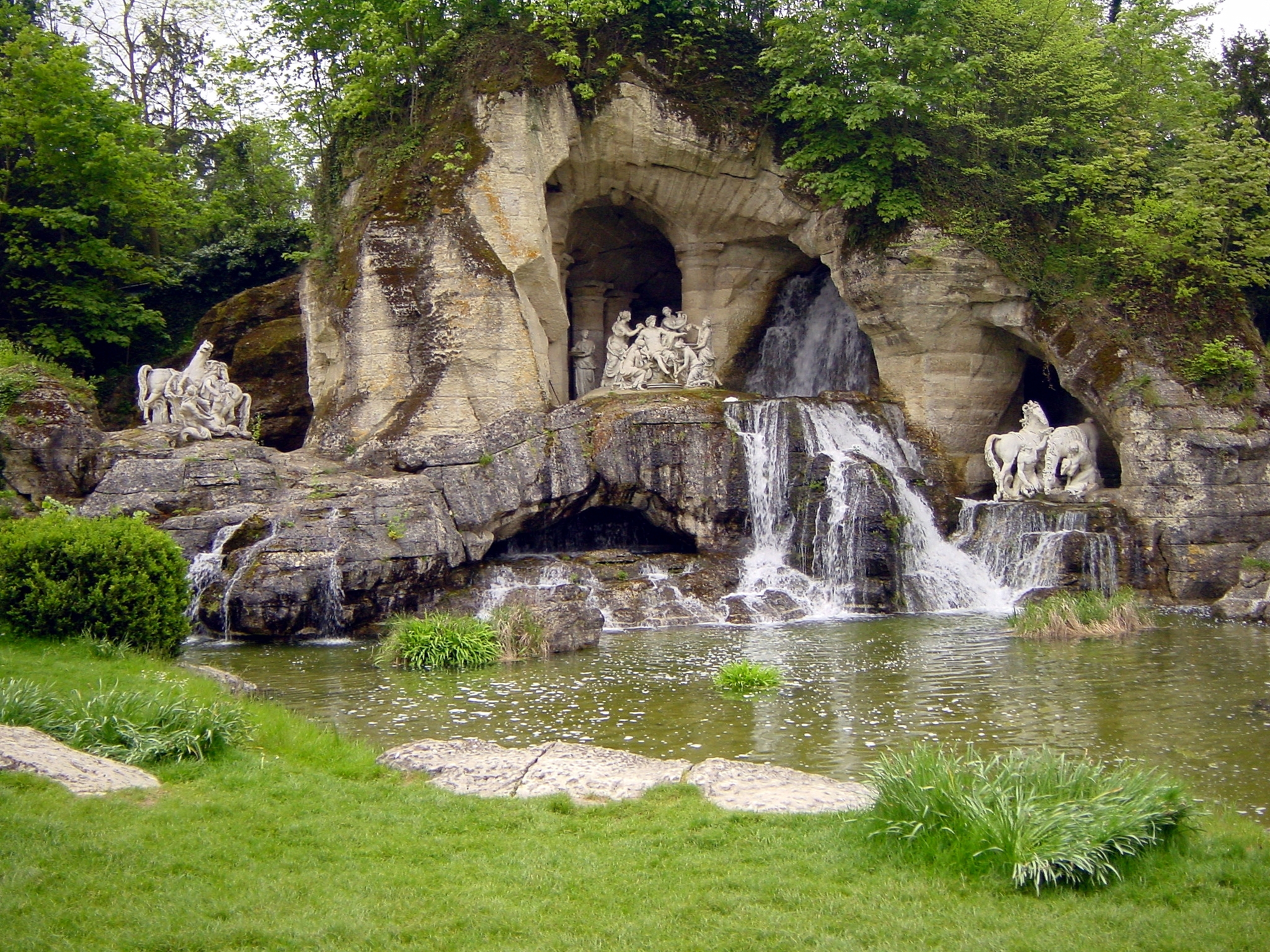
Bosquet of the baths of Apollo, in the gardens of Versailles

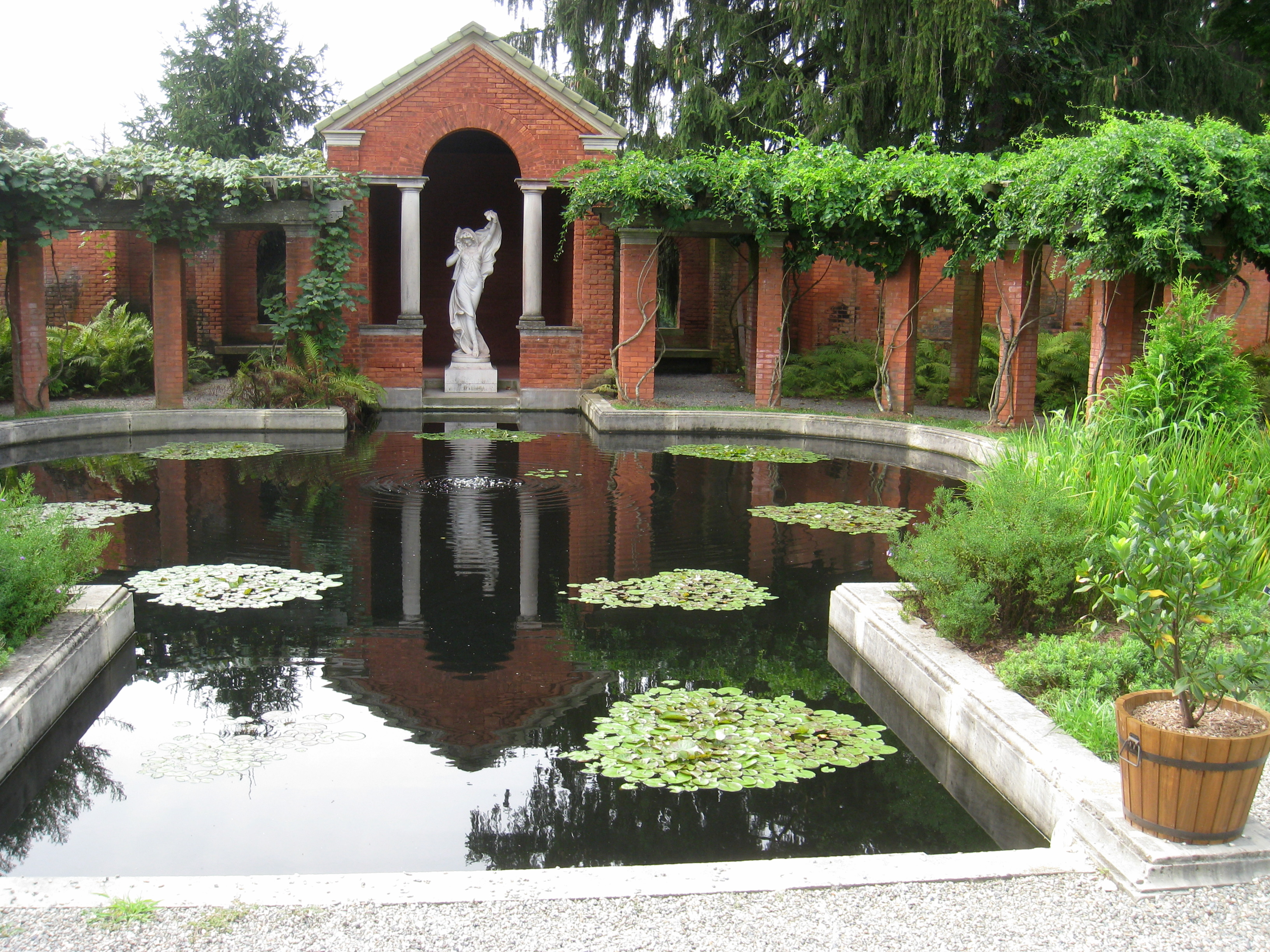
The Vanderbilt Mansion pond

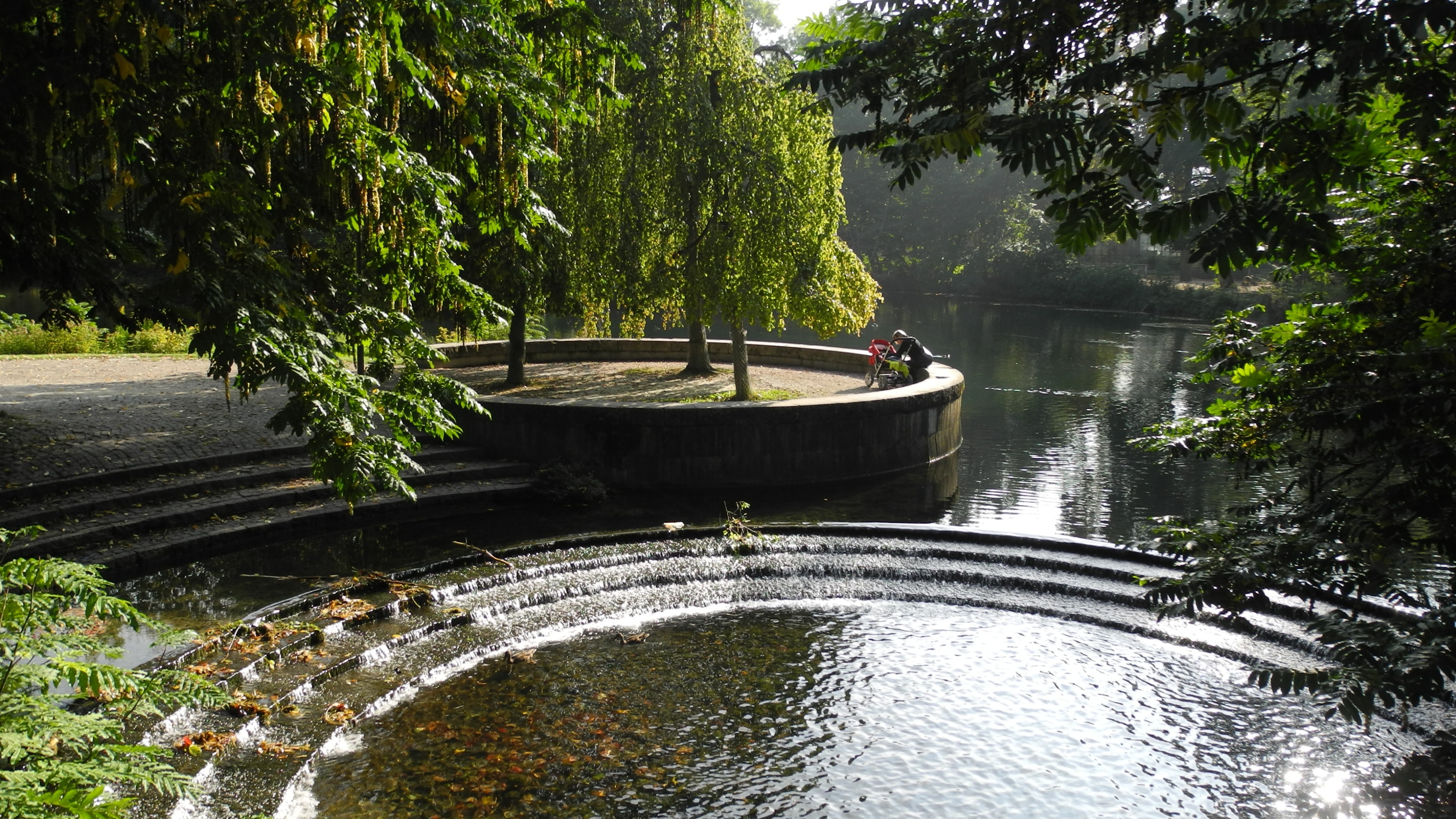
Ulm–Friedrichsau gardens

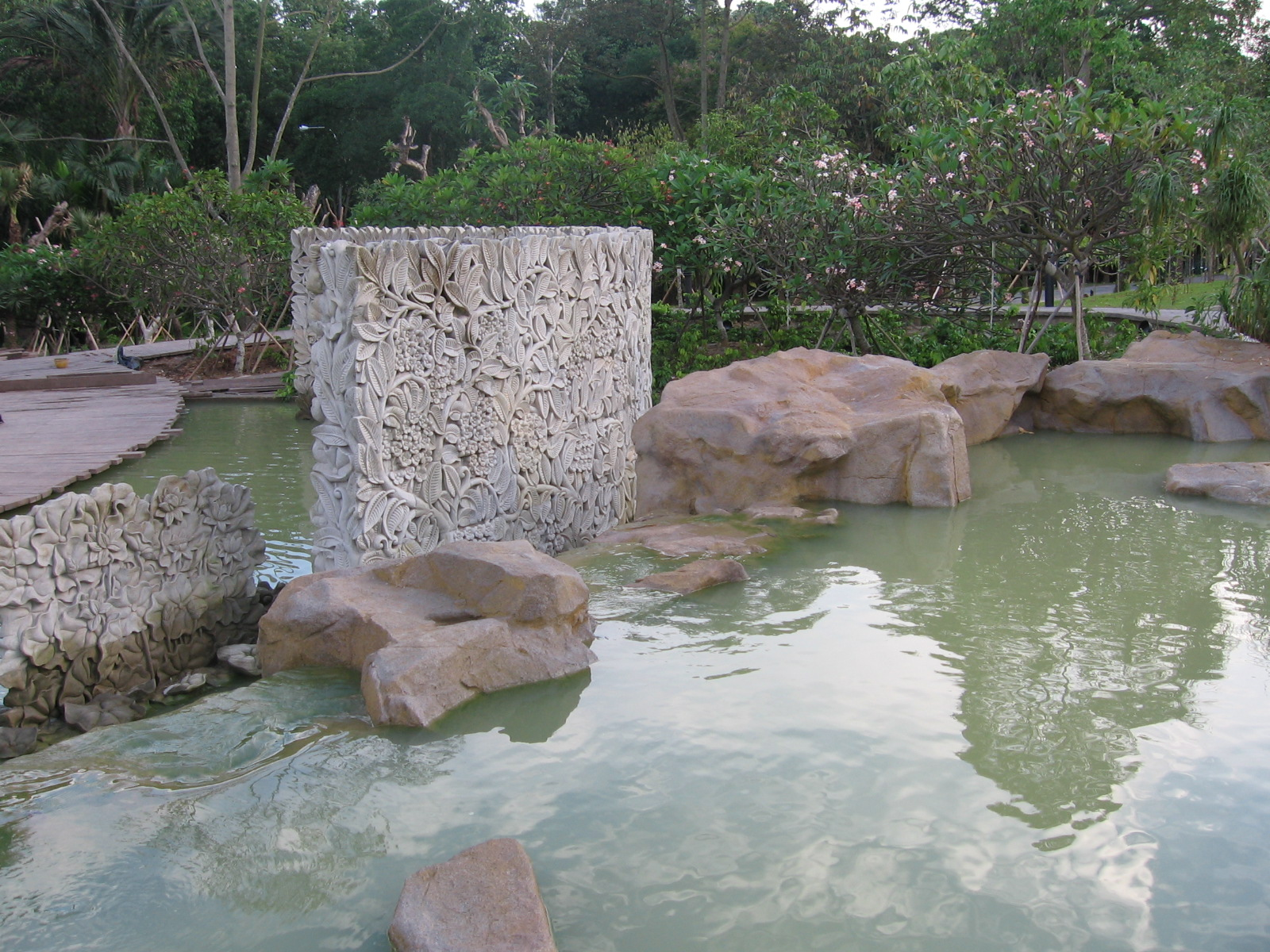
Singapore Botanic Gardens

== Water follies ==
The sixteenth century in Europe saw a renewed interest in Greek thought and philosophy, including the works of Hero of Alexandria about hydraulics and pneumatics. His devices, such as temple doors operated by invisible weights or flowing liquids, and mechanical singing birds powered by steam, motivated several European palaces to create similar clever devices to enhance their public image.

In Italy several royal houses constructed large water gardens incorporating mechanical devices in water settings. The best-known is the Villa d'Este at Tivoli, constructed in 1550 AD. A hill cascaded with many fountains and grottoes, some with water-driven figures that moved or spouted water. Popularity spread across Europe with the well-known water garden at Hellbrunn Palace built with many water-powered human and animal performing figures and puppet theaters, and folly fountains that erupted without notice to surprise visitors.

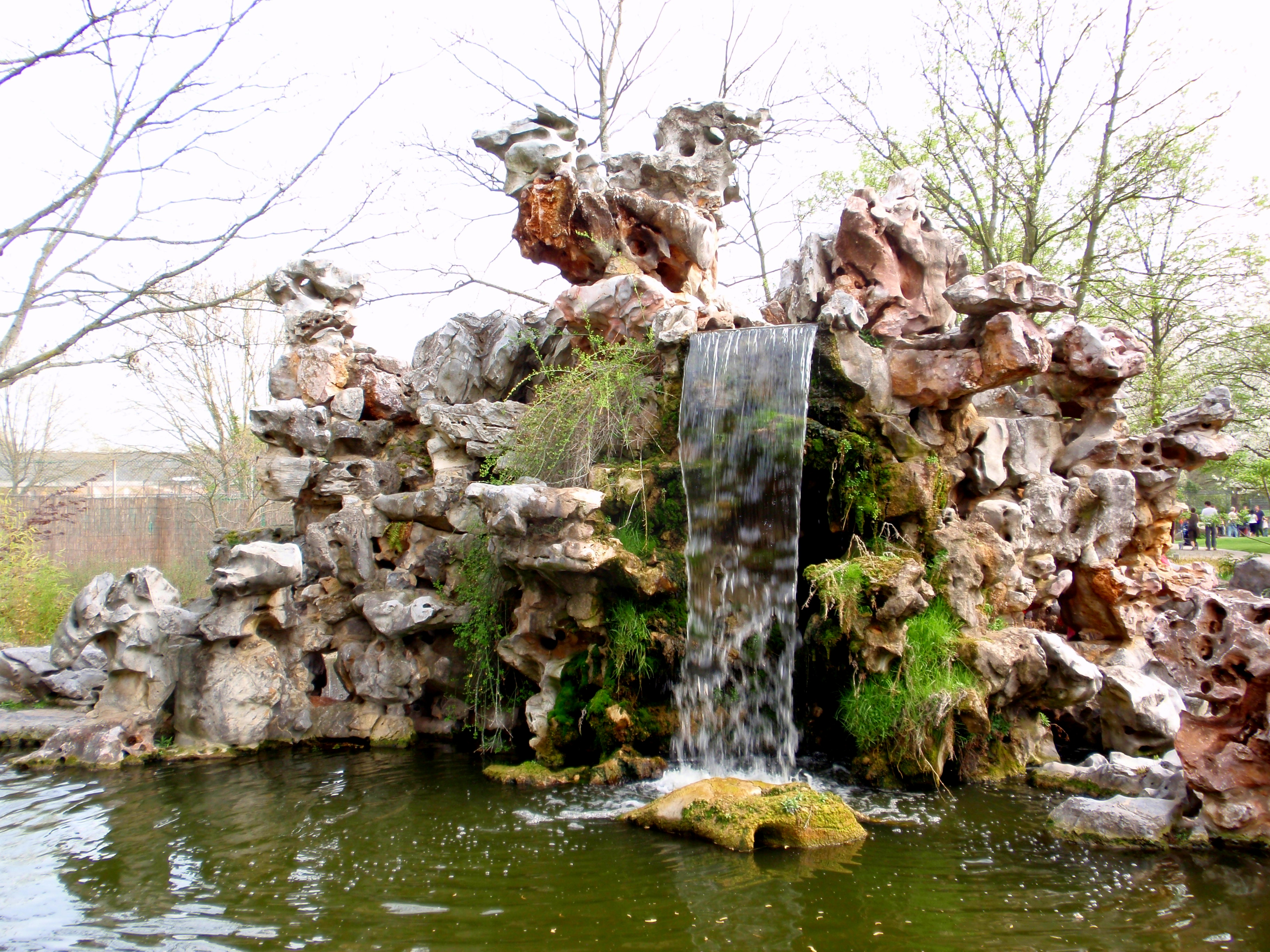
A water folly/tea-pavilion in Mannheim's Chinese garden Duojingyuan

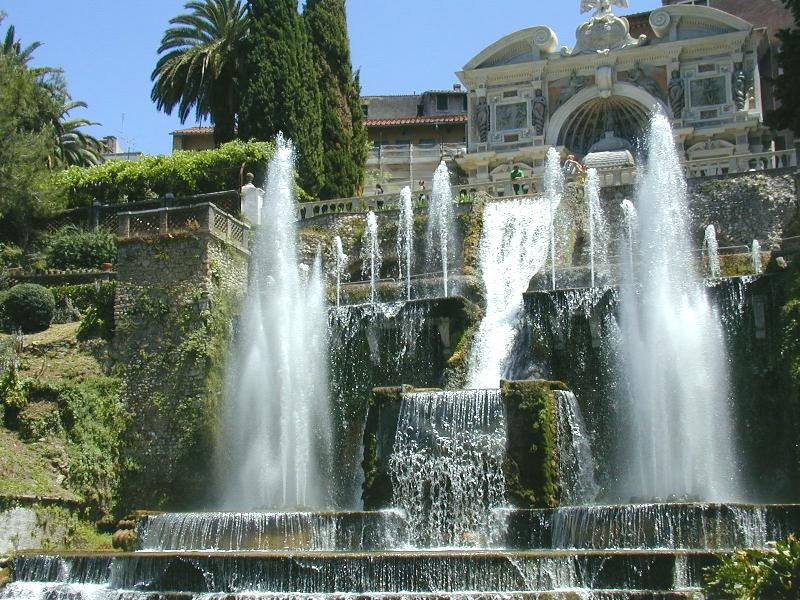
Partial view the garden of Villa d'Este in Tivoli (Italy)

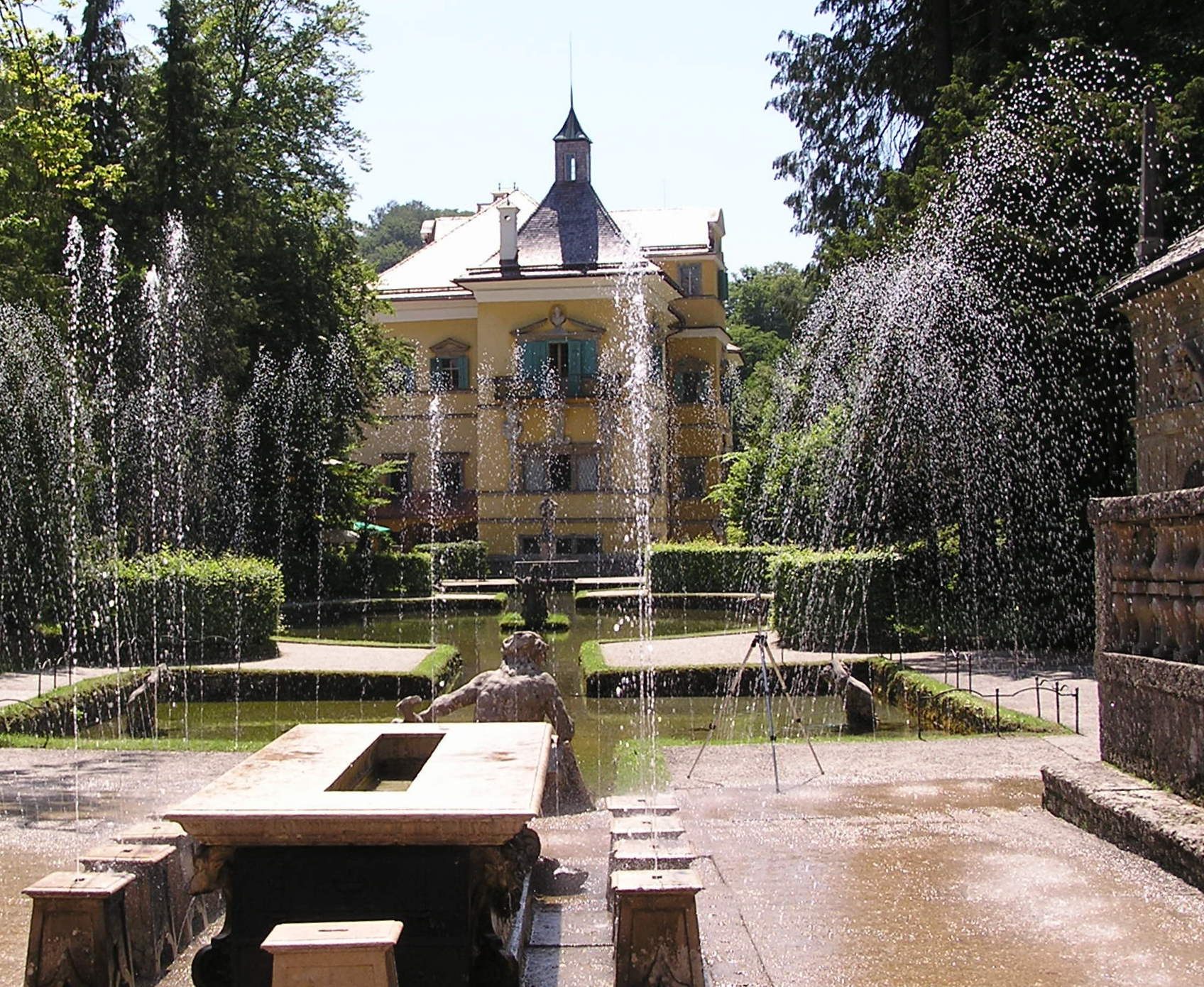
Partial view of the garden of Hellbrunn Palace in Salzburg (Austria)

== Stream gardens ==
On a constructed stream, placing rocks in the path of the water makes small patterns, rapids and waterfalls. The rocks disrupt the waterflow, causing splashing and bubbles that can make pleasant sounds and micro-habitats for plants, fish, and wildlife. Well-placed rocks can create splashing water that adds oxygen to prevent hypoxia: the more bubbles, the more dissolved oxygen in the water.

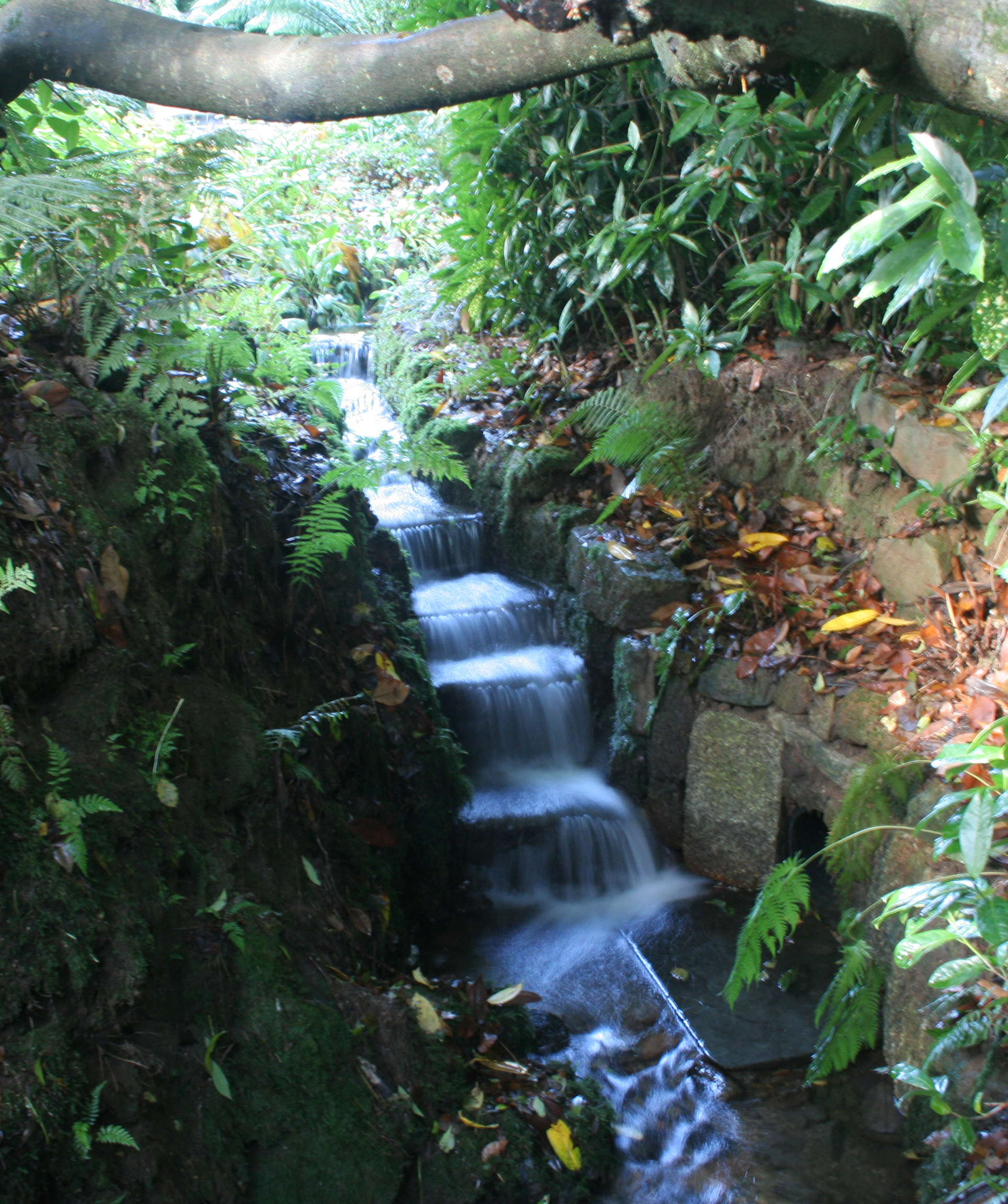
Stream Garden Trengwainton

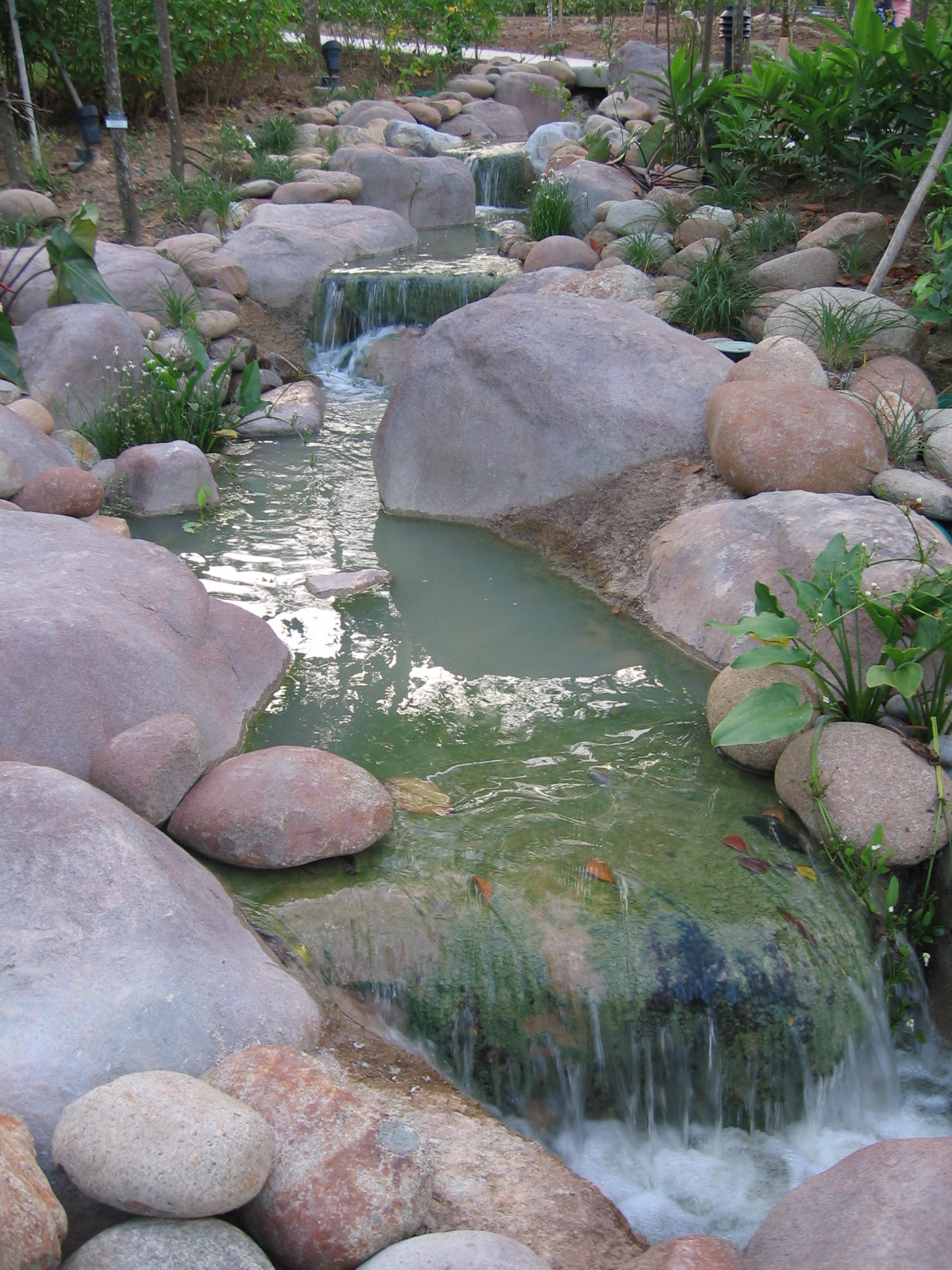
Singapore Botanic Gardens

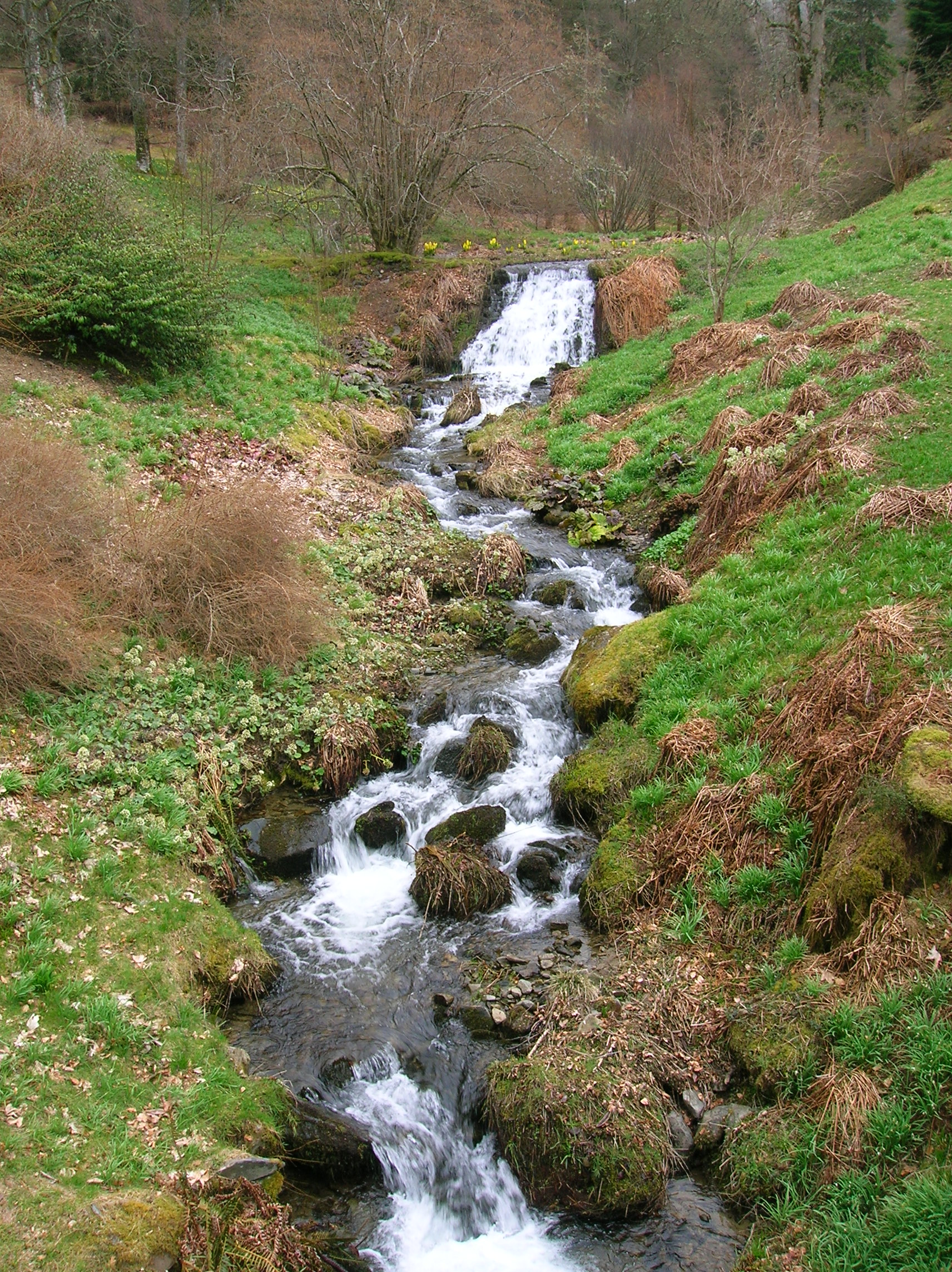
Scrape Burn, Dawyck Botanic Gardens

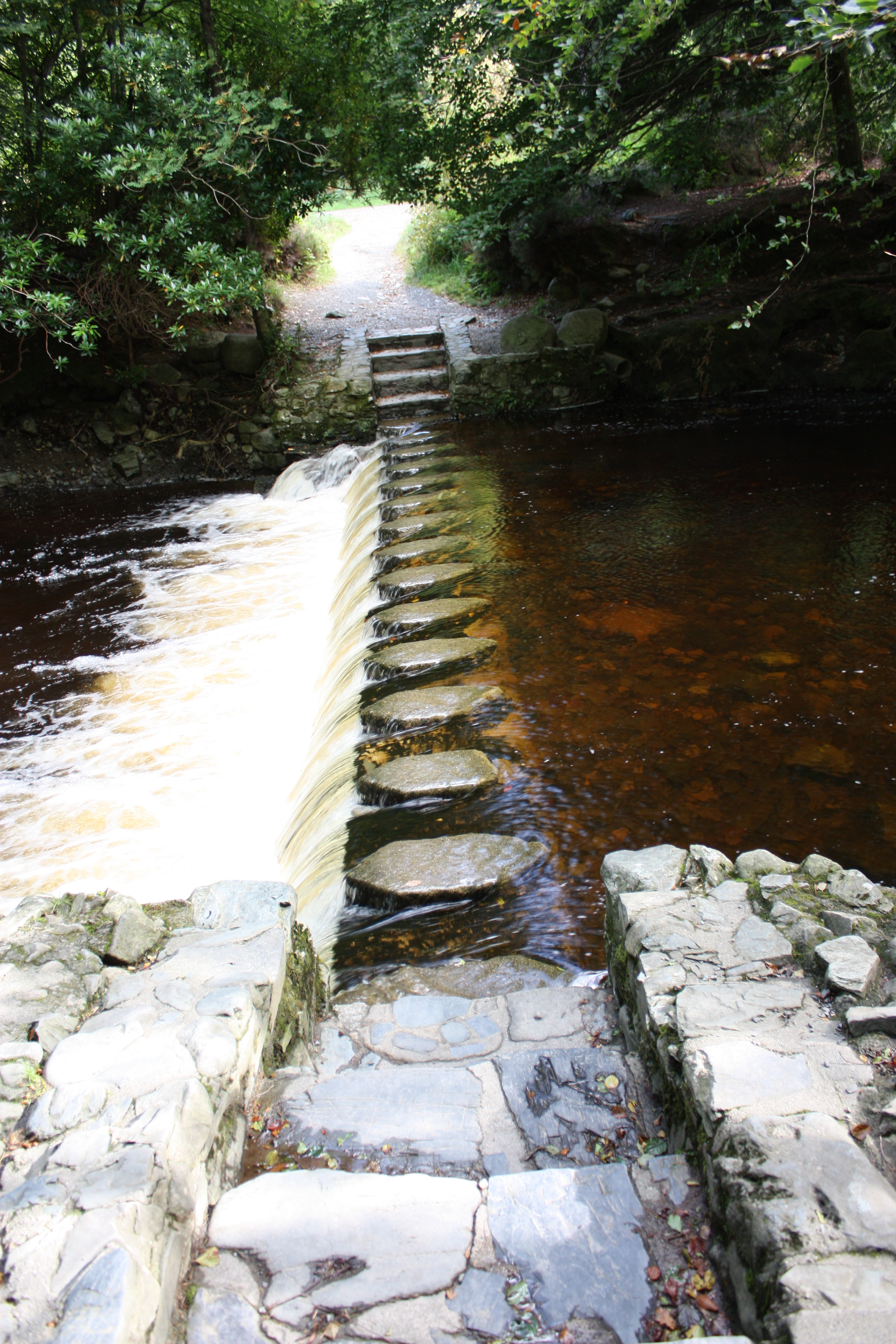
Stepping stones, Tollymore

== Aquatic flora ==
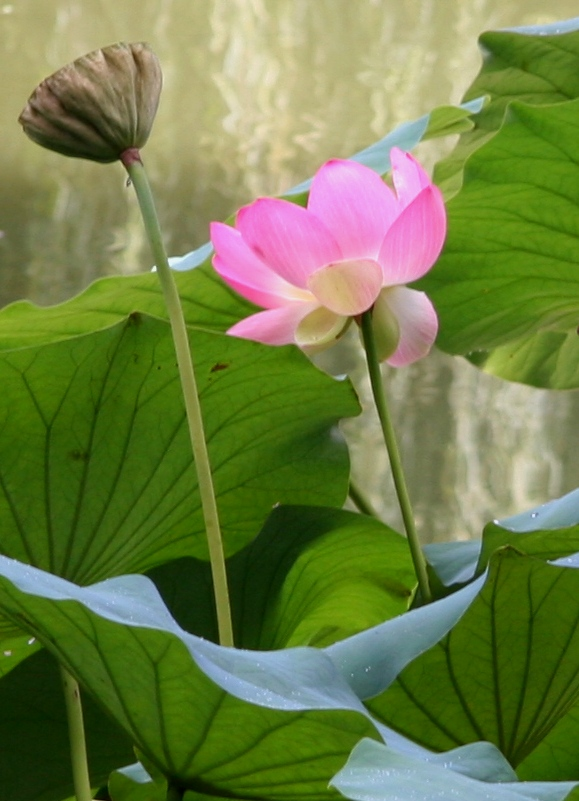
Lotus

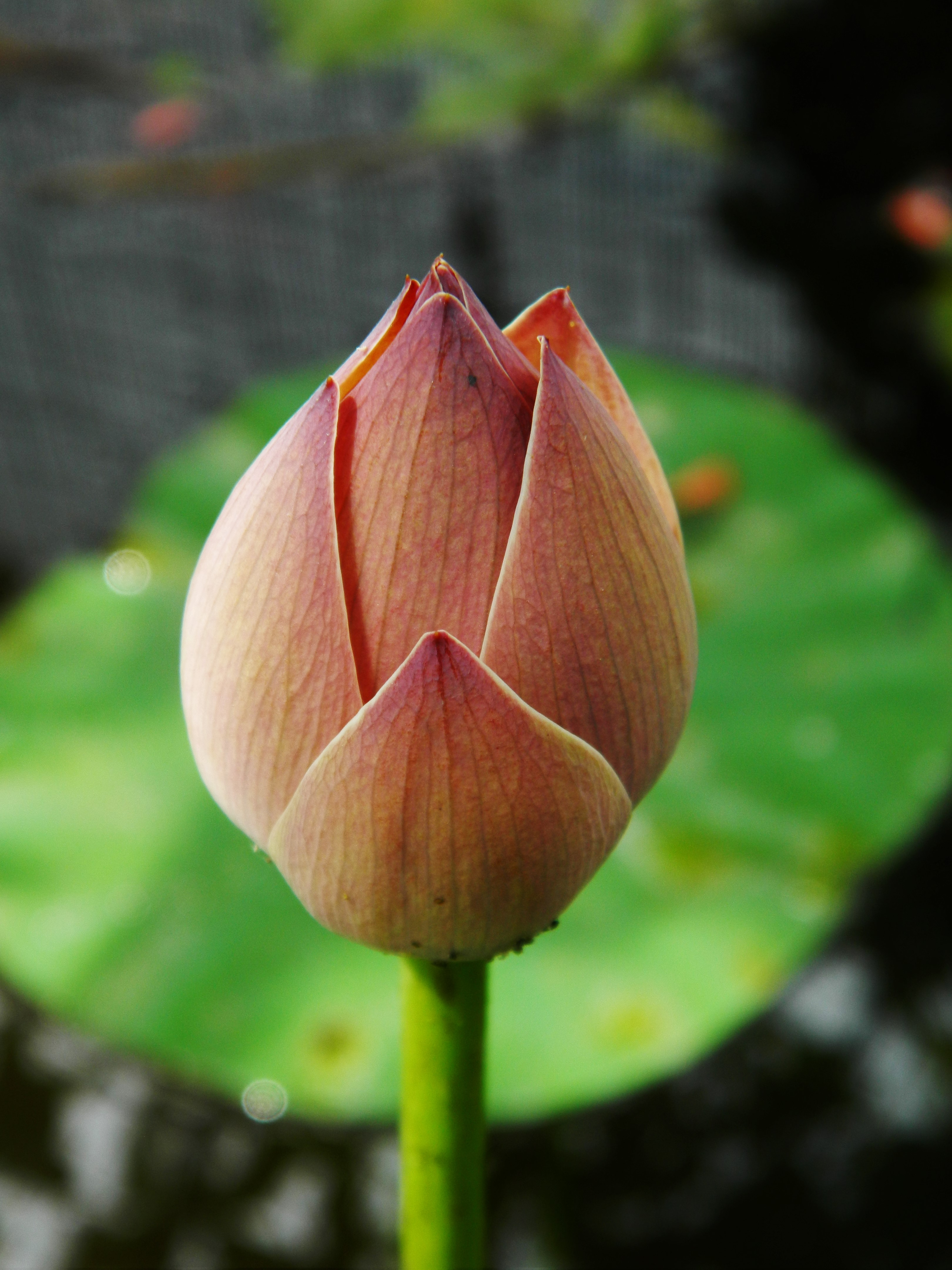
Nelumbo nucifera bud

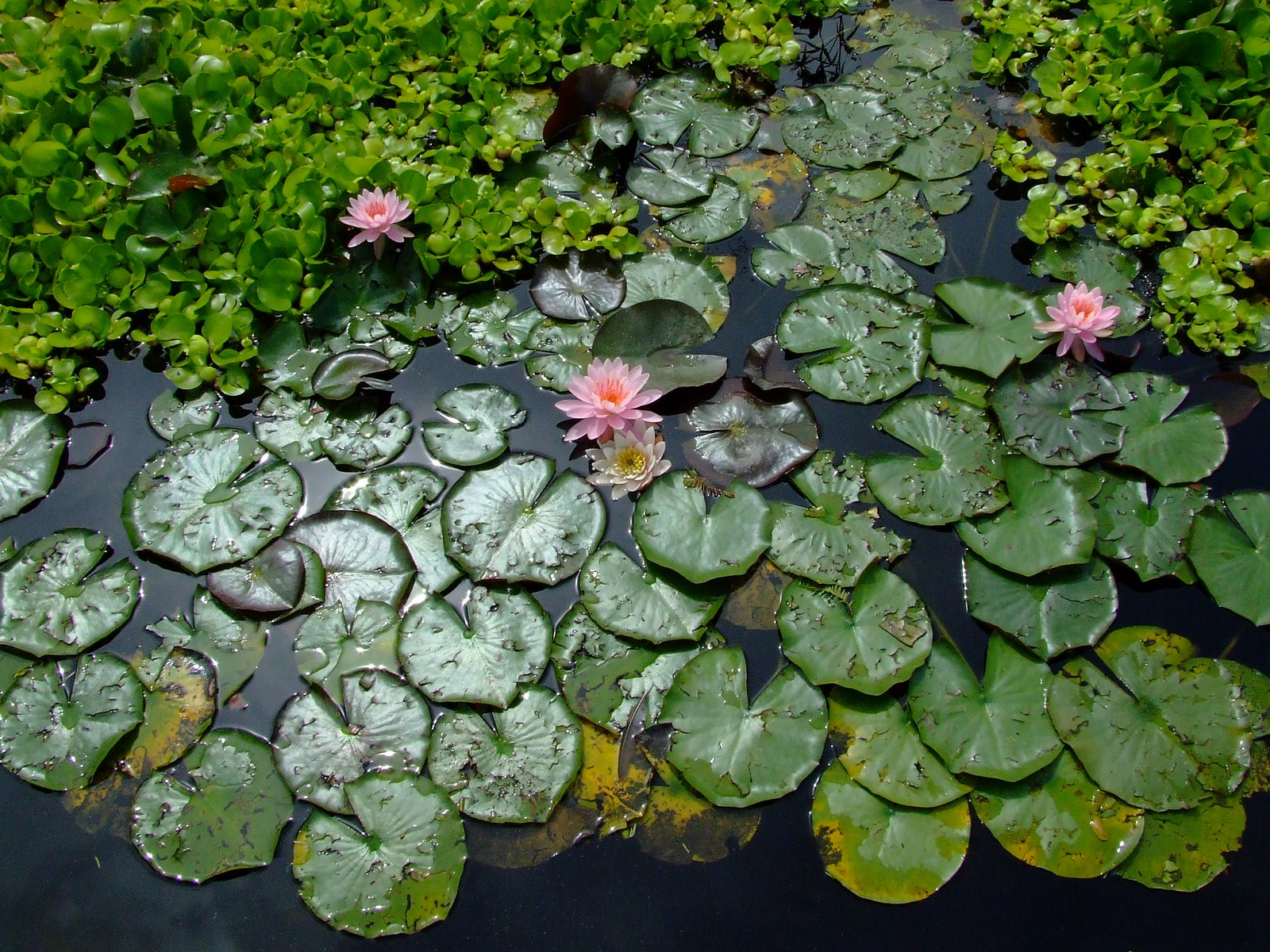
Zilker Botanical Garden, waterlilies

Water garden plants are divided into three main categories: submerged, marginal, and floating.

- Submerged plants are those which live almost completely under the water, sometimes with leaves or flowers that grow to the surface such as with the water lily. These plants are placed in a pond or container usually 1–2 ft (0.30–0.61 m) below the water surface. Some of these plants act as oxygenators as they create oxygen for any animals which live in a pond. Examples of submerged plants are:
  - Hornwort (Ceratophyllum demersum)
  - Water-lilies (Nymphaeaceae)
  - Lotus (Nelumbo spp.)
  - Featherfoil (Hottonia palustris)
  - Eurasian water milfoil (Myriophyllum spicatum)
  - Shining pondweed (Potamogeton lucens)
  - Bladderwort (Utricularia spp.)
- Marginal plants are those which live with their roots under the water but the rest of the plant above the surface. These are usually placed so that the top of the pot is at or barely below the water level. Examples of these are:
  - Iris or flag (Iris spp.)
  - Water-plantain (Alisma spp.)
  - Bulrush (Scirpus lacustris)
  - Cattail (Typha latifolia)
  - Taro (Colocasia esculenta)
  - Arrowhead (Sagittaria latifolia)
  - Bog-arum (Calla palustris)
  - Pickerelweed (Pontederia cordata)
- Floating plants are those that are not anchored to the soil at all, but are free-floating on the surface. In water gardening, these are often used as a provider of shade to reduce algae growth in a pond. These are often extremely fast growing/multiplying. Examples of these are:
  - Mosquito ferns (Azolla spp.)
  - Water-spangle (Salvinia spp.)
  - Frogbit (Hydrocharis morsus-ranae)
  - Water lettuce (Pistia stratiotes)
  - Water hyacinth (Eichhornia crassipes)

Some areas of the United States do not allow certain of these plants to be sold or kept, as they have become invasive species in warmer areas of the country, such as Florida and California.

=== Algae ===
Algae are found in almost all ponds. There are hundreds of species of algae that can grow in garden ponds, but they are usually noticed only when they become abundant. Algae often grow in very high densities in ponds because of the high nutrient levels that are typical of garden ponds. Generally, algae attaches itself to the sides of the pond and remains innocuous. Some species of algae, such as "blanket weed", can grow up to a foot a day under ideal conditions and can rapidly clog a garden pond. On the other hand, free floating algae are microscopic and are what cause pond water to appear green. Blanket weed, although unsightly, is actually a sign that the water is clean and well-balanced. Green water (free floating algae) means there are too many nutrients in the water, usually from rotting vegetation or too many fish for the space. Killing the free floating algae with chemicals will often cause it to die, rot, and then make the problem even worse as more nutrients enter the water. Adding more floating or submerged (unpotted) plants can help with the green water, as they can take the nutrients out of the water. There are also filters that can be installed to remove the nutrients and all types of algae from the water. Many ponds naturally go green early in the spring and then clear up.

== Fauna ==
=== Fish ===
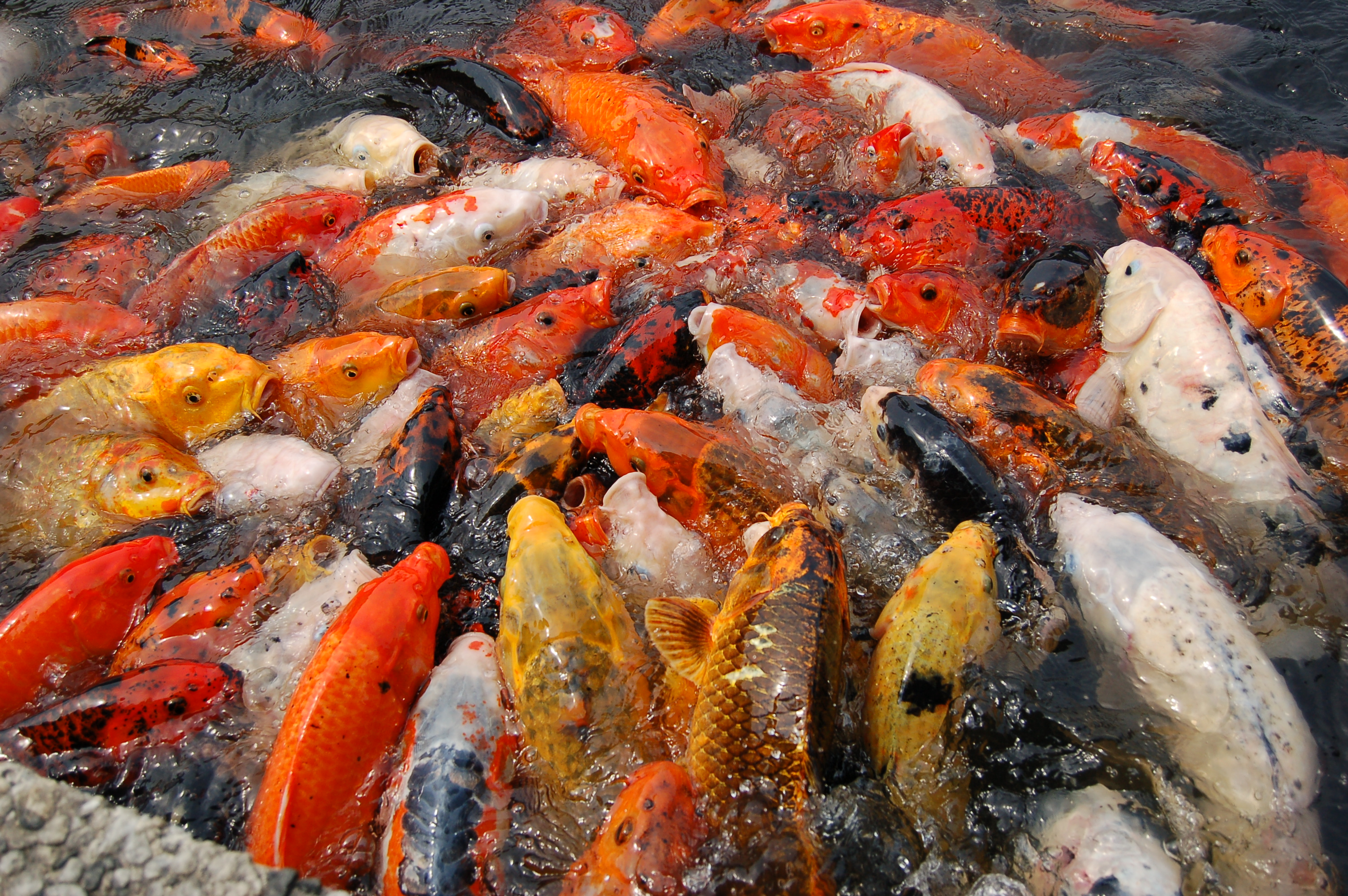
Koi fish

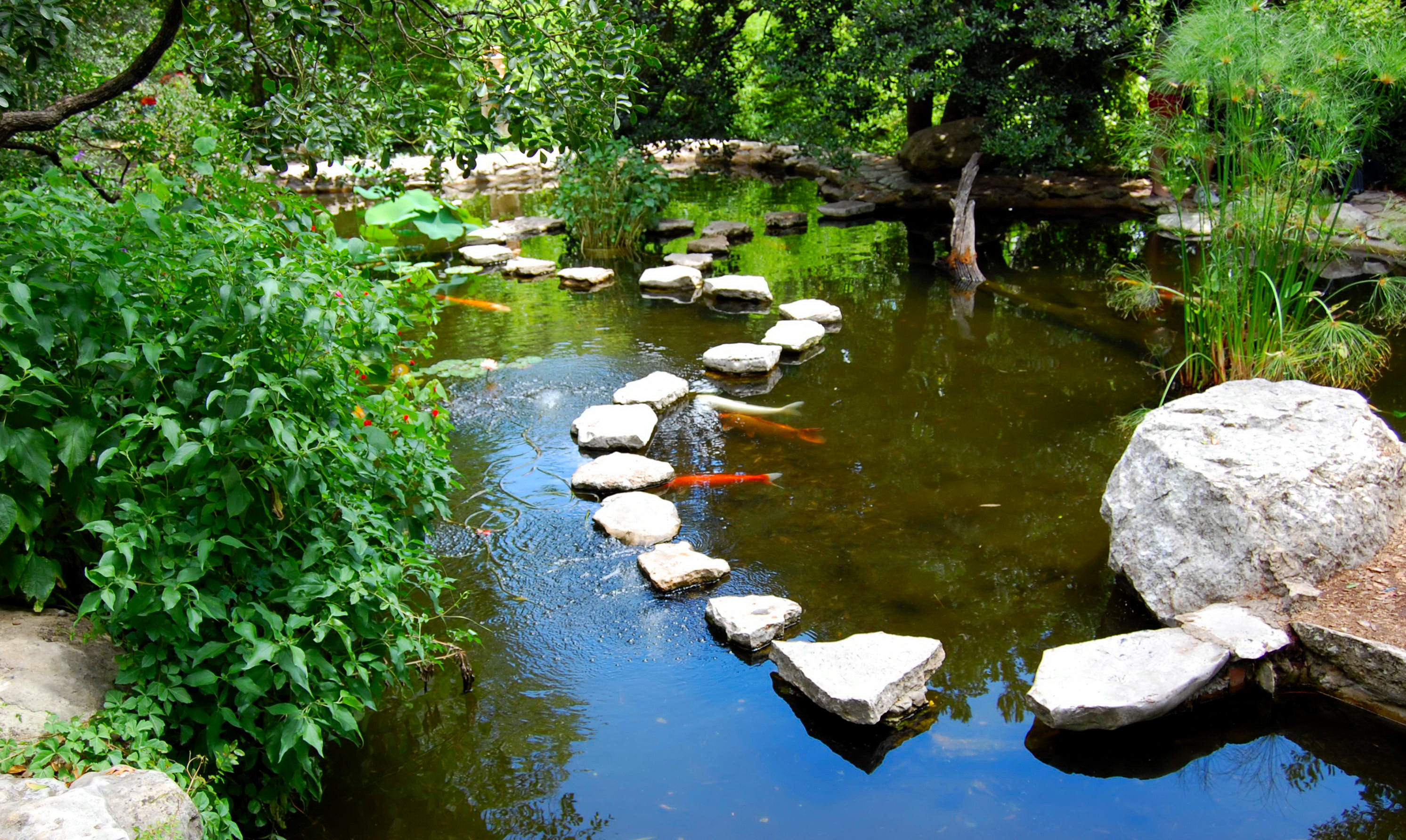
Fishpond with stepping stones and stream

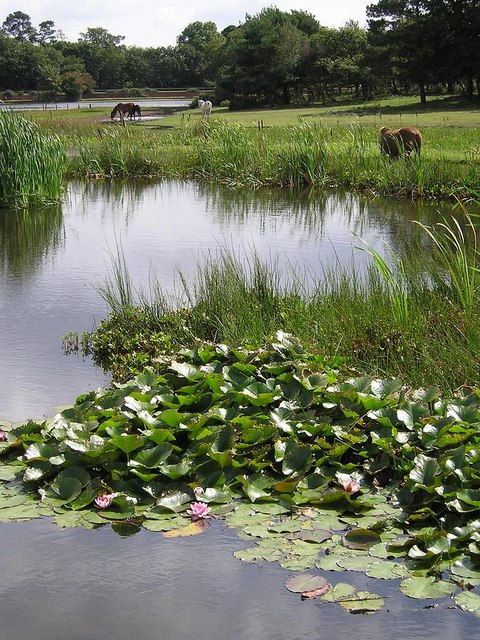
Hatchet Pond, New Forest, England

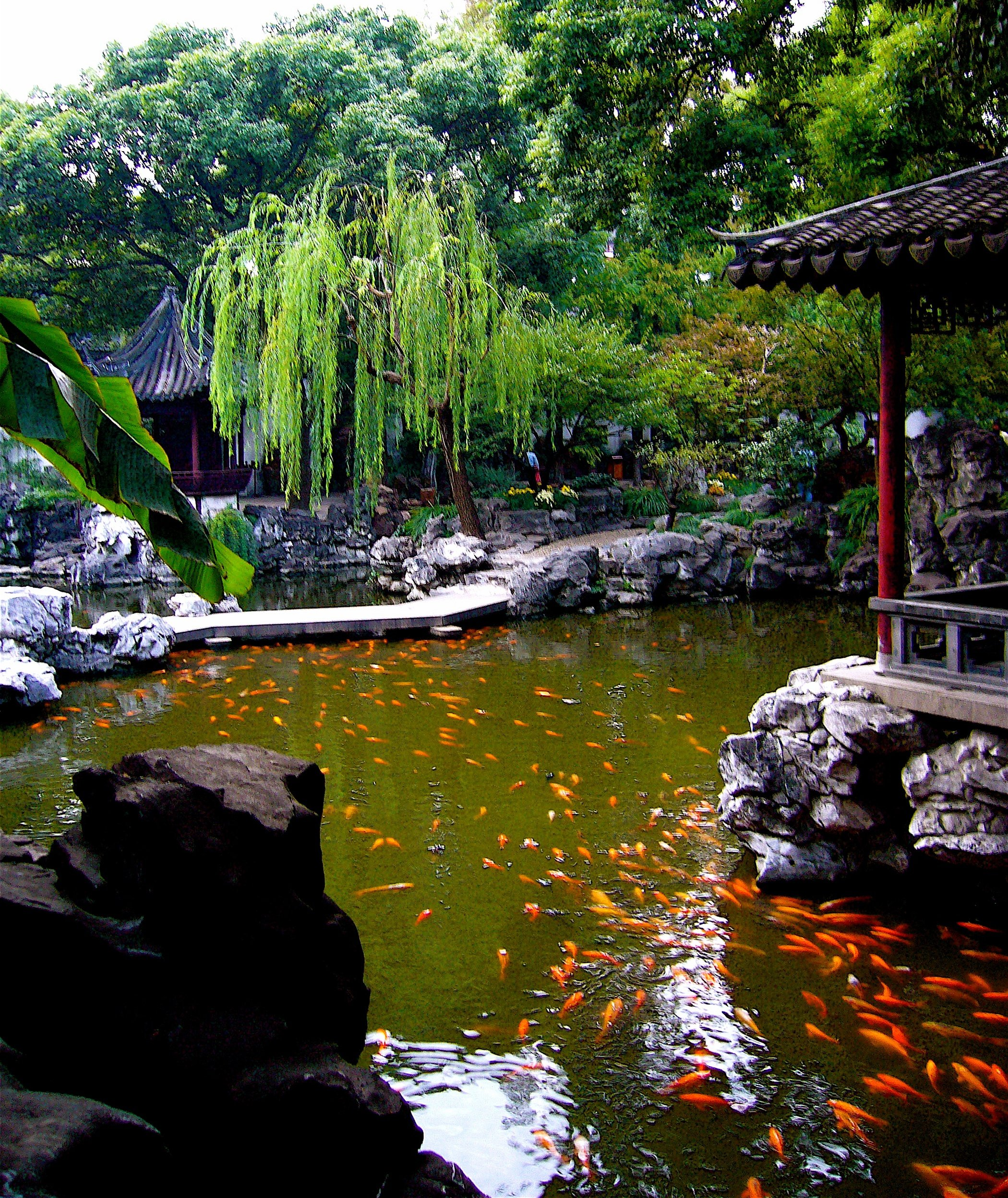
Fish in a pond in Yuyuan Garden, Shanghai

Often the reason for having a pond in a garden is to keep fish, often koi, though many people keep goldfish. Both are hardy, colorful fish which require no special heating, provided the pond is located in an area which does not have extremes of temperature that would affect the fish. If fish are kept, pumps and filtration devices are usually needed in order to keep enough oxygen in the water to support them. In winter, a small heater may need to be used in cold climates to keep the water from freezing solid. Examples of common pond fish include:

- Ricefish (Himedaka)
- Mosquitofish
- Rosy Red minnows
- White Cloud Mountain minnows
- Common minnows
- Goldfish (Common, Comet, Shubunkin varieties, Wakin and the Fantail varieties. With the possible exception of some of the fantail varieties, the fancy goldfish are not suited to pond life.)
- Crucian carp
- Koi (Nishikigoi, Butterfly Koi and Ghost Koi)
- Mirror carp
- Common carp (In multiple countries, including the United States of America and Australia, carp are considered an invasive fish and it is illegal to release them into waterways and/or imported or transported.)
- Grass carp
- Weather loach
- Stone loach
- Golden orfe
- Golden tench
- Golden rudd
- Gudgeon
- Red shiner
- Three-spined sticklebacks
- Eel
- Channel catfish
- Bluegill
- Pumpkinseed
- Black bass
- Sturgeon
- Snakehead
- Goby

=== Crustacean ===
- Crayfish
- Freshwater prawn

=== Snails ===
- River snail

Small aquatic snails are usually found in ponds that contain plants. Some people purchase apple snails to keep in their water garden. "Melantho snails" of the genus Lymnaea are also used.

=== Herpetofauna ===
Ponds located in suburban and rural areas often attract amphibians such as Common Frogs and Fire Salamanders and reptiles such as turtles, lizards, and snakes.

=== Bird ===
- Wild duck
- Domestic duck

=== Predators ===
Garden ponds can attract attention from predators such as (in North America) raccoons, herons, snakes, and domestic cats. These predators can be a danger to fish. Owners of koi are often particularly careful to create protected areas as some varieties are very expensive.

== See also ==
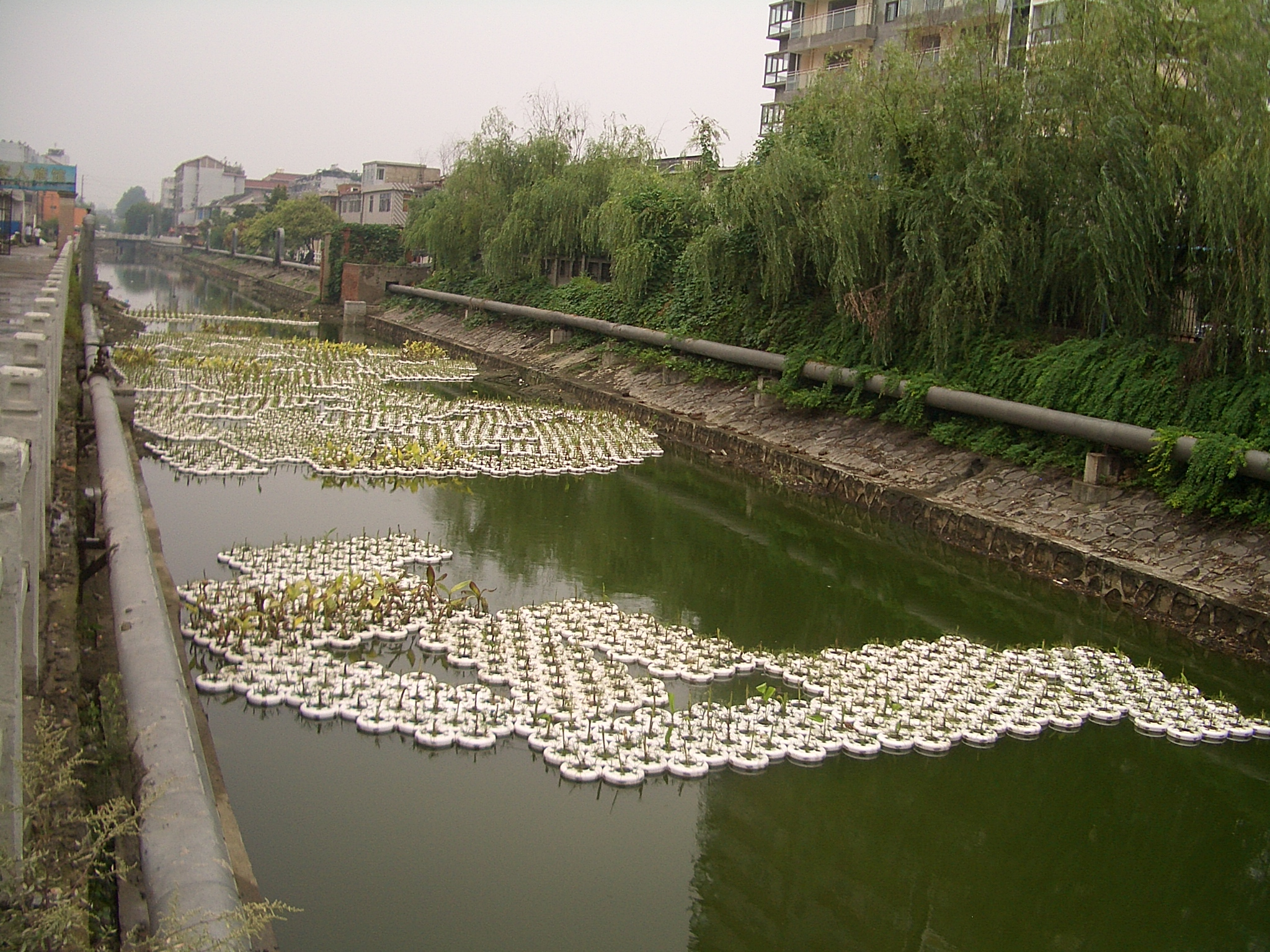
Water plants cultivated in the Yangzhuanghe Canal in Yangzhou, China

- List of garden types
- Landscape architecture
- Aquascaping, arranging plants in an aquarium
- Rain garden
- Biochemical oxygen demand
- Chemical oxygen demand
- Wastewater quality indicators
- Biotope
- Aquaponics

=== Index categories ===
- Category: Natural pools
