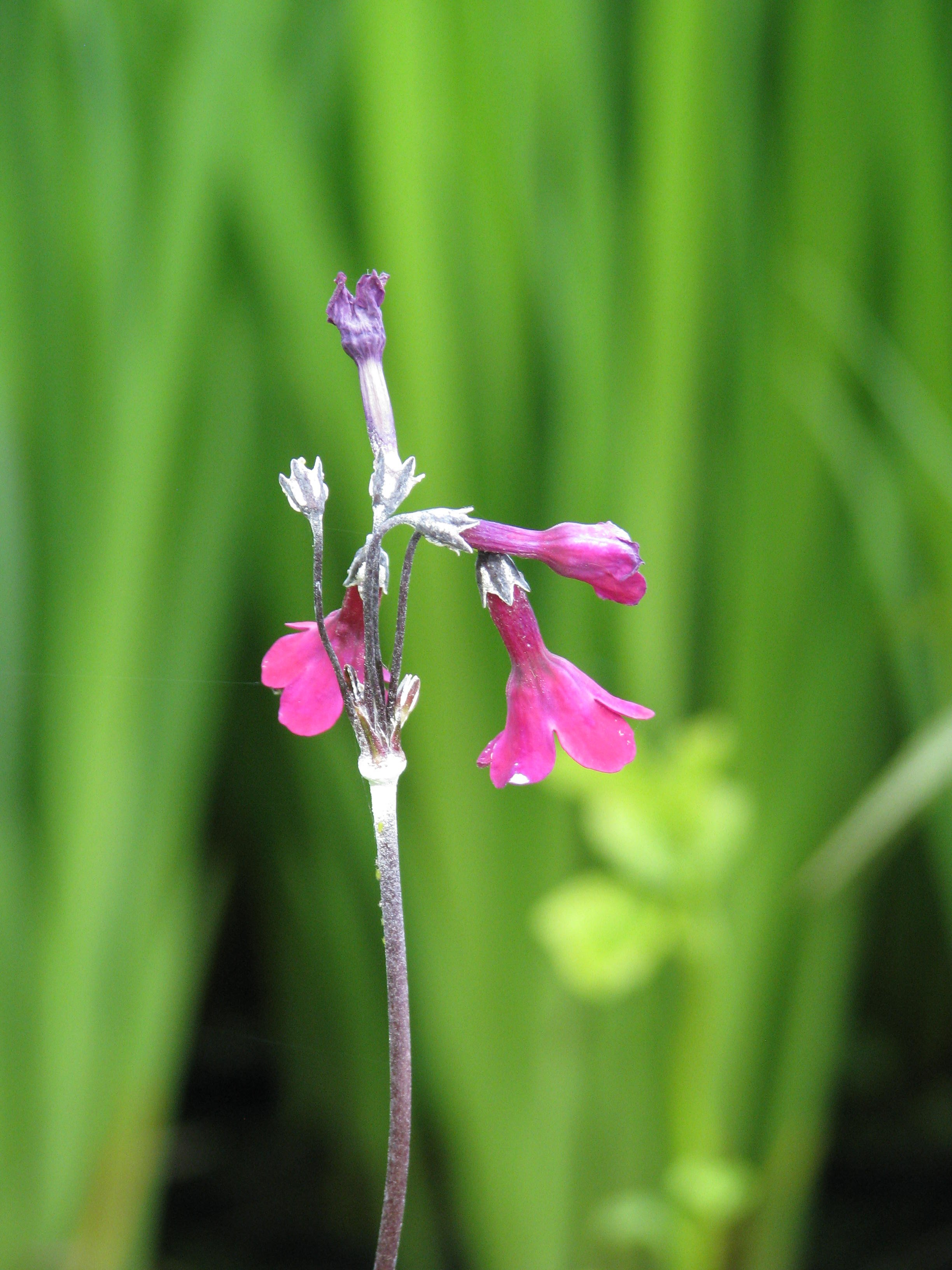

Scientific classification
- Kingdom: Plantae
- Clade: Tracheophytes
- Clade: Angiosperms
- Clade: Eudicots
- Clade: Asterids
- Order: Ericales
- Family: Primulaceae
- Genus: Primula
- Species: P. secundiflora

Binomial name
- Primula secundiflora Franch.

= Primula secundiflora =

Species of flowering plant

Primula secundiflora (偏花报春 pian hua bao chun), the second-flowered primrose, is a species of flowering plant in the family Primulaceae, native to western China (E Qinghai, W Sichuan, E Xizang, NW Yunnan)., where it inhabits wet places at 3,200–4,800 m (10,500–15,700 ft). It belongs to the Candelabra group of primulas (sect. Proliferae). Growing to 80 cm (31 in) tall, it is a semi-evergreen perennial bearing clusters of nodding deep red flowers at the top of erect stems.

This plant is sometimes cultivated. It prefers neutral or acid soil, and is especially suitable for moist places such as the banks of streams or ponds, in partial shade.
