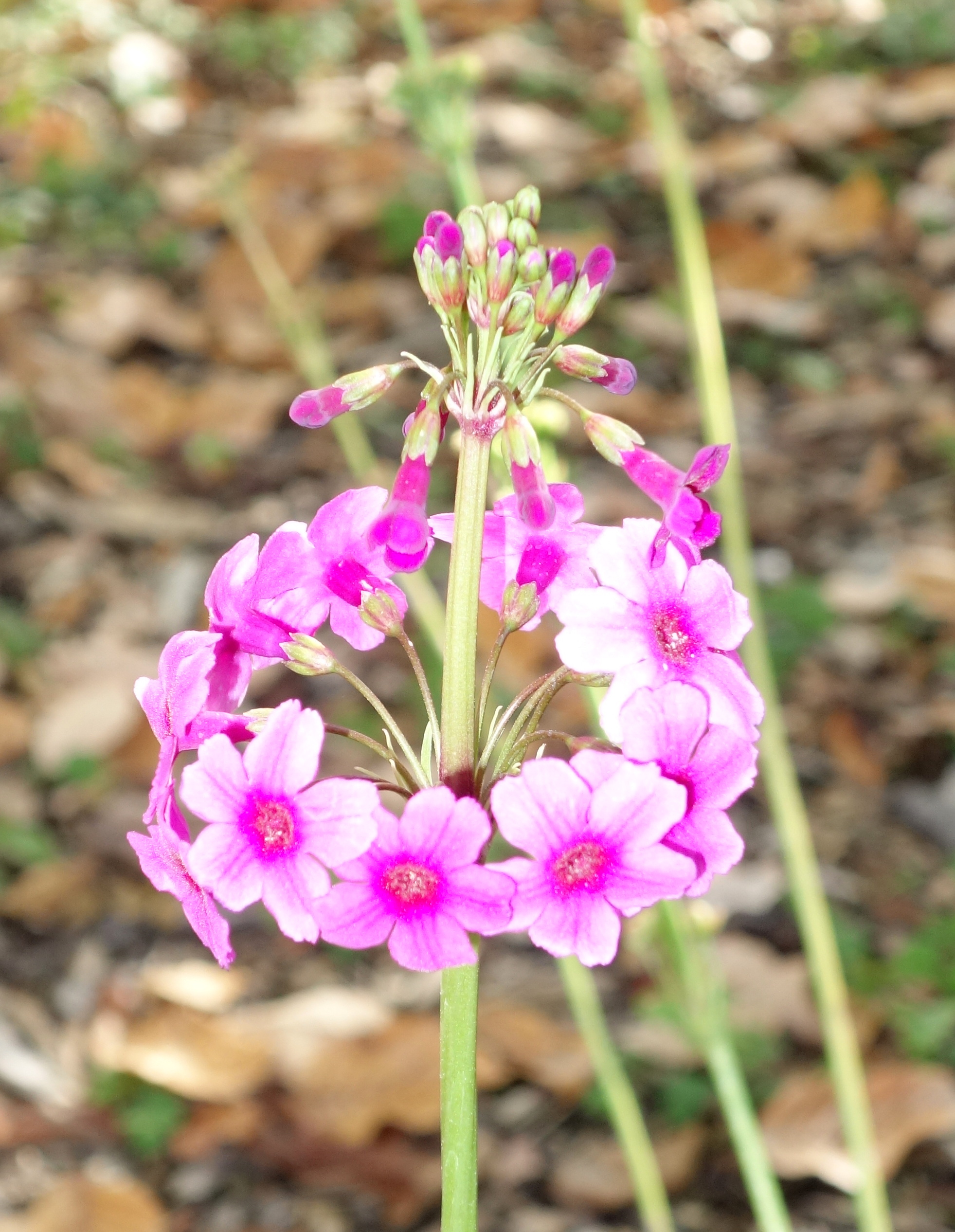

Scientific classification
- Kingdom: Plantae
- Clade: Tracheophytes
- Clade: Angiosperms
- Clade: Eudicots
- Clade: Asterids
- Order: Ericales
- Family: Primulaceae
- Genus: Primula
- Species: P. poissonii

Binomial name
- Primula poissonii Franch.

= Primula poissonii =

Species of flowering plant

Primula poissonii (海仙花 hai xian hua), Poisson's primrose, is a species of flowering plant in the primrose family Primulaceae, native to wet areas at altitudes of 2,500–3,100 m (8,200–10,200 ft) in western Sichuan and central and northern Yunnan, China.

== Description ==
This semi-evergreen perennial belongs to the Candelabra group of primulas (sect. Proliferae), with leaves forming a rosette, the leaf blades obovate-elliptic to oblanceolate, strongly tapering to base. The flowers are arranged in whorls at regular intervals up the vertical stem. The corolla is deep purplish crimson or rose-purple, tubular, 0.9 to 1.1 cm in length, rising from a scape of 25–40 cm (9.8–15.7 in) in length.

== Cultivation ==
Primula poissonii is sometimes cultivated as an ornamental plant. It requires a heavy, moisture-retentive, acid or neutral soil in full sun or partial shade. It is an ideal subject for the wet banks of a pond or stream.
