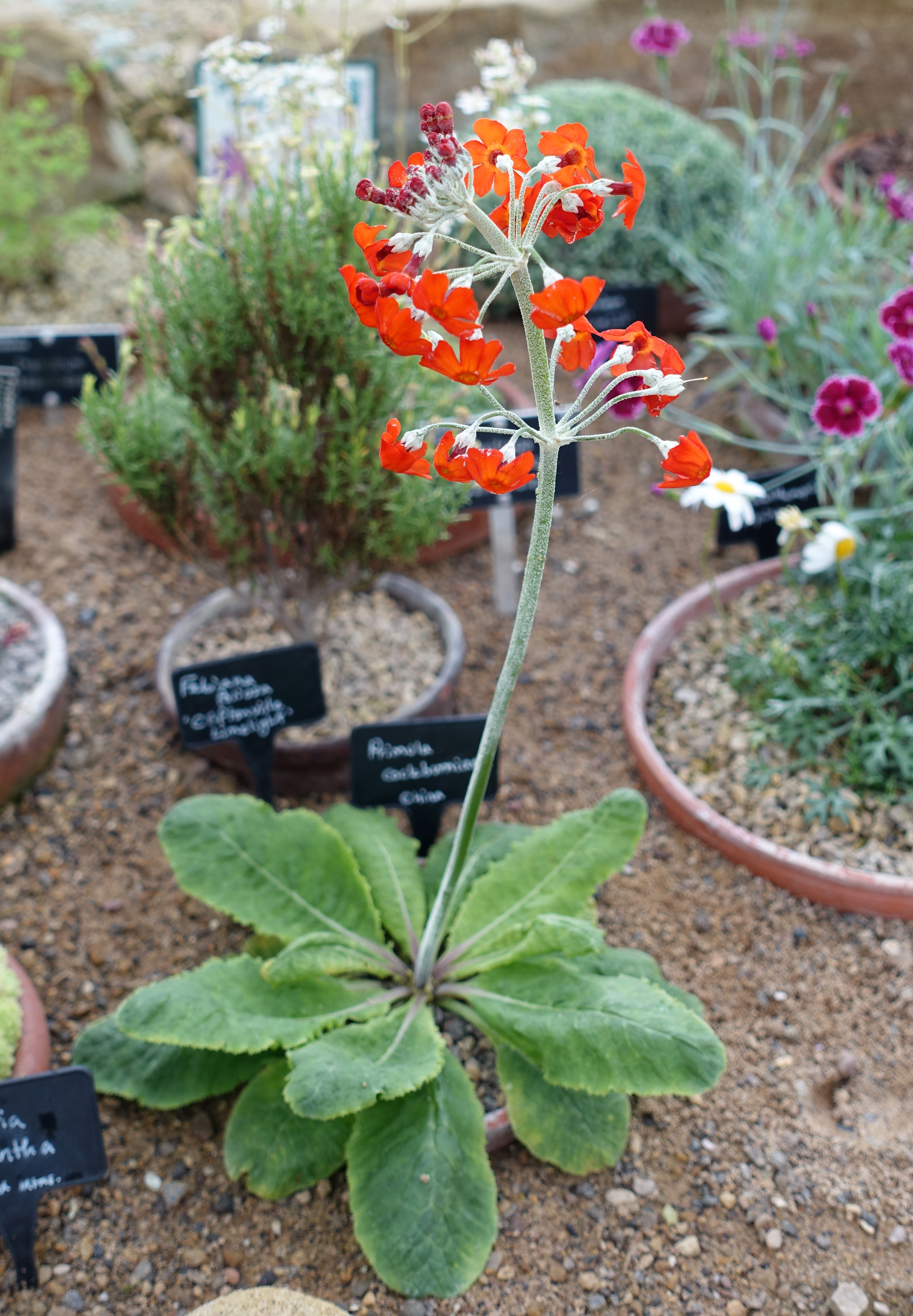
- At RHS Garden Harlow Carr

Scientific classification
- Kingdom: Plantae
- Clade: Tracheophytes
- Clade: Angiosperms
- Clade: Eudicots
- Clade: Asterids
- Order: Ericales
- Family: Primulaceae
- Genus: Primula
- Species: P. cockburniana

Binomial name
- Primula cockburniana Hemsl.

Synonyms
- Aleuritia cockburniana (Hemsl.) Soják; Primula operculata R.Knuth

= Primula cockburniana =

Species of flowering plant

Primula cockburniana, called the Cockburnia primrose, is a species of flowering plant in the genus Primula, native to south-central China. A short-lived perennial, it has gained the Royal Horticultural Society's Award of Garden Merit.
