= Field mouse =

Field mouse may refer to:

== Animals ==
- Field mouse, in Europe, Asia and North Africa, one of several species of mice in the genus Apodemus
- Field mouse, in North America, a vole, such as:
  - Meadow vole, a North American vole
- Field mouse, in South America, one of several species of mice in the genus Akodon

== Arts and entertainment ==
- "Field Mice" (CSI), a 2010 episode of CSI
- The Field Mice, an English indie pop band
- Field Mouse (band), a Brooklyn, New York, US-based dream pop band
