= Pond liner =

Impermeable material for garden ponds

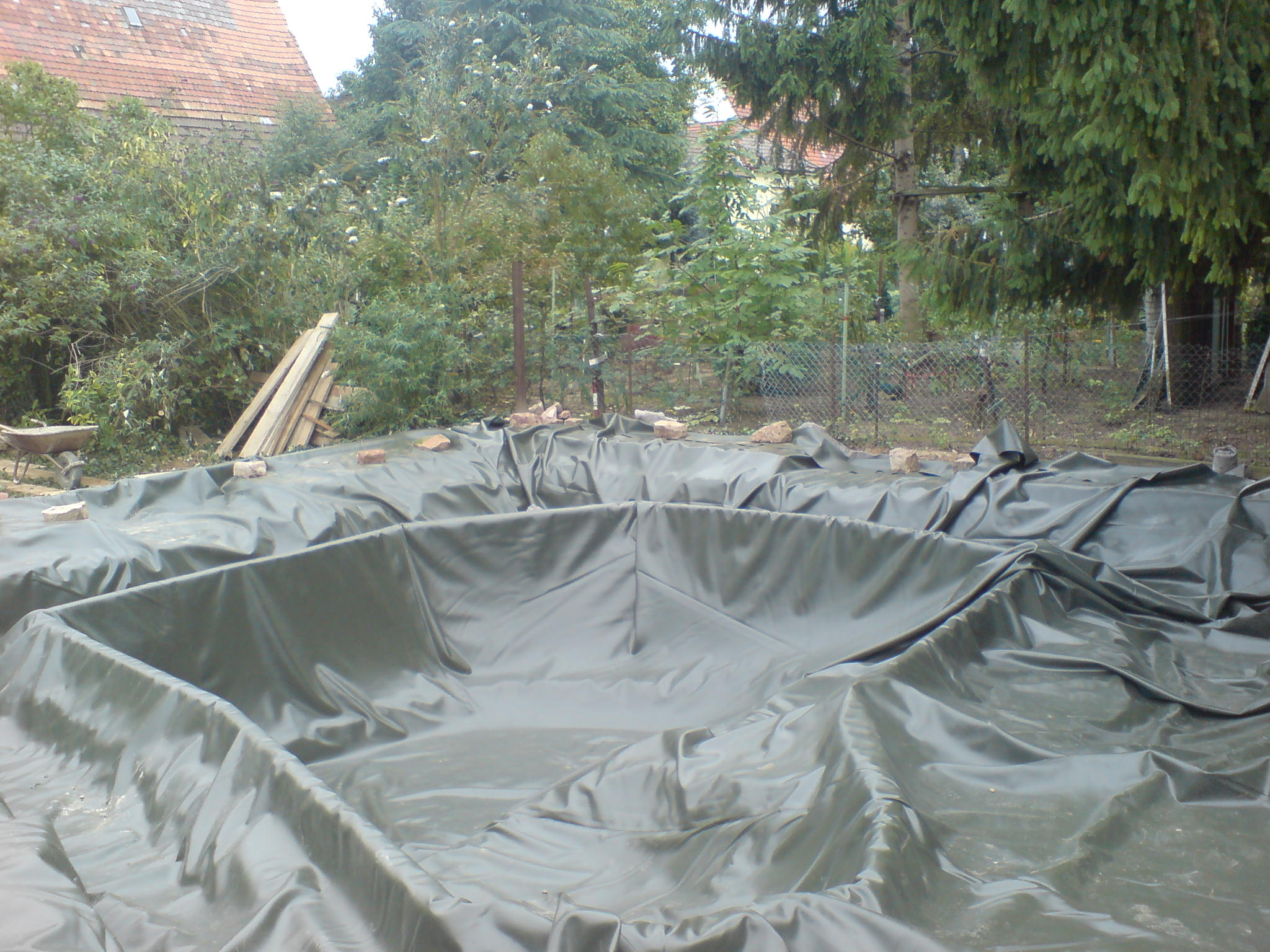
Pond liner for a garden pond

A pond liner is an impermeable geomembrane used for retention of liquids, including the lining of reservoirs, retention basins, hazardous and nonhazardous surface impoundments, garden ponds and artificial streams in parks and gardens.

== Installation ==
Pond liners need to be protected from sharp objects (for example, stones) below the liner and from being punctured by any objects in the water body. Protection can be provided with layers of sand, geotextiles (particularly needle-punched nonwovens) and other materials. Pond liners are manufactured in rolls or accordion-folded on pallets. When deployed in the field their edges and ends are overlapped and seamed together. Methods are thermal fusion, solvents, adhesives and tapes.

The edge of the pond liner is generally rolled over the top of the soil slope and secured in an anchor trench or it can be fixed to a vertical wall made of wood or concrete. Box-shaped pond liners can be made for rectangular structures. The vast majority of flexible pond liners (aka, geomembranes) are available commercially and are manufactured using the following polymers; HDPE, LLDPE, fPP, PVC, EPDM. They can also be manufactured with a fabric scrim between two plys of the polymer, e.g., PE-R, CSPE-R, fPP-R, EPDM-R, and BGM. Geomembranes can also be made in-situ by spraying a polymer (polyurea, or equal) directly on a geotextile substrate. The lifetime of these various ponds liners depends greatly on whether they are exposed or covered. Clay liners can also be used which have extremely long lifetimes as long as they do not dry and crack by shrinkage and/or settlement.

== See also ==
- Geomembranes
- Bituminous geomembrane
- Landfill liner
- Landscape engineering
- Raceway (aquaculture)
- Raceway pond
