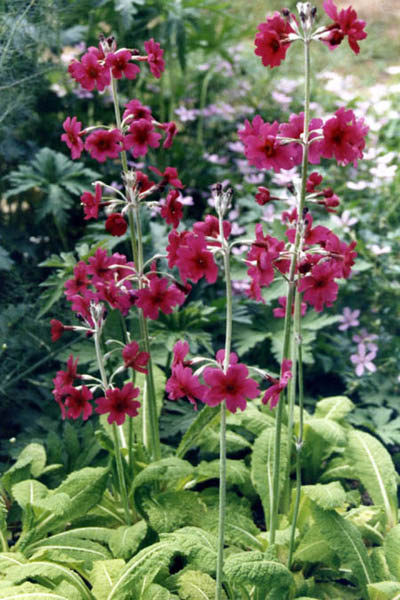

Scientific classification
- Kingdom: Plantae
- Clade: Tracheophytes
- Clade: Angiosperms
- Clade: Eudicots
- Clade: Asterids
- Order: Ericales
- Family: Primulaceae
- Genus: Primula
- Species: P. pulverulenta

Binomial name
- Primula pulverulenta Duthie

Synonyms
- Aleuritia pulverulenta (Duthie) Soják; Primula japonica f. robusta Hemsl.; Primula shihmienensis W.P.Fang

= Primula pulverulenta =

Species of flowering plant

Primula pulverulenta, the mealy primrose or mealy cowslip, is a species of flowering plant in the family Primulaceae. It is native to damp habitats in China. It is a herbaceous perennial growing to 100 cm (39 in) tall by 60 cm (24 in) broad, with strong stems of deep pink flowers arising from basal rosettes of leaves in early summer. The flowers are grouped at intervals along the stem in a tiered formation, hence the common name "candelabra primula" which is often applied to this and other species with a similar arrangement.

The leaves are obovate to oblanceolate, measuring 10 - 30 cm long and 8 - 10 cm wide. They have a rugged, dentate appearance, narrowing towards the petiole

The specific epithet pulverulenta, meaning "dust", refers to the mealy white layer (farina) covering the stems of the plant.

This plant has gained the Royal Horticultural Society's Award of Garden Merit. In cultivation it requires a neutral or acid soil which remains permanently moist, such as the bank of a stream or pond, in full or partial sunlight.
