= List of Lysimachia species =

Lysimachia is a genus of flowering plants in the family Primulaceae. As of May 2024 282 species are accepted.

== A ==
- Lysimachia abscondita R.Trevis., Funez & Hassemer
- Lysimachia acroadenia Maxim.
- Lysimachia acuminata (Welw. ex Schinz) U.Manns & Anderb.
- Lysimachia adoensis (Kunze) Klatt
- Lysimachia albescens Franch.
- Lysimachia alfredi Hance
- Lysimachia alpestris Champ. ex Benth.
- Lysimachia alternifolia Wall.
- Lysimachia amoena (Sol. ex Gaertn.) Hassemer, Funez & R.Trevis.
- Lysimachia andina Sandwith
- Lysimachia angustiloba (Engl.) U.Manns & Anderb.
- Lysimachia ardisioides Masam.
- Lysimachia arvensis (L.) U.Manns & Anderb.
- Lysimachia aspera Hand.-Mazz.
- Lysimachia asperulifolia Poir.
- Lysimachia assamica C.M.Hu
- Lysimachia atropurpurea L.
- Lysimachia auriculata Hemsl.
- Lysimachia azorica Hook.

== B ==
- Lysimachia baoxingensis (F.H.Chen & C.M.Hu) C.M.Hu
- Lysimachia barbata (P.Taylor) U.Manns & Anderb.
- Lysimachia barystachys Bunge
- Lysimachia baviensis C.M.Hu
- Lysimachia biflora C.Y.Wu
- Lysimachia borealis (Raf.) U.Manns & Anderb.
- Lysimachia brachyandra F.H.Chen & C.M.Hu
- Lysimachia brevianthera Xin W.Li
- Lysimachia breviflora C.M.Hu
- Lysimachia brevipes (P.Taylor) U.Manns & Anderb.
- Lysimachia brittenii R.Knuth

== C ==
- Lysimachia caloneura G.Hao, X.L.Yu & A.Liu
- Lysimachia campestris Funez, Hassemer & R.Trevis.
- Lysimachia candida Lindl.
- Lysimachia capillipes Hemsl.
- Lysimachia carinata Y.I.Fang & C.Z.Cheng
- Lysimachia catharinensis R.Trevis., Funez & Hassemer
- Lysimachia cauliflora C.Y.Wu
- Lysimachia cavicola You Nong & Y.G.Wen
- Lysimachia chapaensis Merr.
- Lysimachia chekiangensis C.C.Wu
- Lysimachia chenii C.M.Hu
- Lysimachia chenopodioides Watt ex Hook.f.
- Lysimachia chiminghui Kottaim.
- Lysimachia chingshuiensis C.I Peng & C.M.Hu
- Lysimachia christinae Hance
- Lysimachia chungdienensis C.Y.Wu
- Lysimachia ciliata L.
- Lysimachia circaeoides Hemsl.
- Lysimachia clethroides Duby
- Lysimachia collina (Schousb.) F.J.Jiménez
- Lysimachia × commixta Fernald
- Lysimachia congestiflora Hemsl.
- Lysimachia cordifolia Hand.-Mazz.
- Lysimachia coriacea S.R.Yi & H.F.Yan
- Lysimachia cousiniana Coss.
- Lysimachia crassifolia C.Z.Gao & D.Fang
- Lysimachia crispidens (Hance) Hemsl.
- Lysimachia crista-galli Pamp. ex Hand.-Mazz.
- Lysimachia cubangensis U.Manns & Anderb.

== D ==
- Lysimachia dabieshanensis Kun Liu & S.B.Zhou
- Lysimachia daphnoides (A.Gray) Hillebr.
- Lysimachia daqiaoensis G.D.Tang & R.Z.Huang
- Lysimachia davurica Ledeb.
- Lysimachia debilis Wall.
- Lysimachia decurrens G.Forst.
- Lysimachia delavayi Franch.
- Lysimachia deltoidea Wight
- Lysimachia dextrorsiflora X.P.Zhang, X.H.Guo & J.W.Shao
- Lysimachia djalonis (A.Chev.) U.Manns & Anderb.
- Lysimachia × doerfleri (Ronniger) Stace
- Lysimachia drynarifolia Franch.
- Lysimachia dubia Aiton
- Lysimachia dushanensis F.H.Chen & C.M.Hu

== E ==
- Lysimachia elegantula (P.Taylor) U.Manns & Anderb.
- Lysimachia engleri R.Knuth
- Lysimachia ephemerum L.
- Lysimachia erosipetala F.H.Chen & C.M.Hu
- Lysimachia esquirolii Bonati
- Lysimachia europaea (L.) U.Manns & Anderb.
- Lysimachia evalvis Wall.
- Lysimachia excisa Hand.-Mazz.

== F ==
- Lysimachia fanii Y.Feng Huang, W.B.Xu & L.N.Dong
- Lysimachia fenghwaiana G.Hao & H.F.Yan
- Lysimachia filifolia C.N.Forbes & Lydgate
- Lysimachia filiformis (Cham. & Schltdl.) U.Manns & Anderb.
- Lysimachia filipes C.Z.Gao & D.Fang
- Lysimachia fistulosa Hand.-Mazz.
- Lysimachia fletcheri C.M.Hu & Bennell
- Lysimachia foemina (Mill.) U.Manns & Anderb.
- Lysimachia foenum-graecum Hance
- Lysimachia fooningensis C.Y.Wu
- Lysimachia forbesii Rock
- Lysimachia fordiana Oliv.
- Lysimachia fortunei Maxim.
- Lysimachia fraseri Duby
- Lysimachia fukienensis Hand.-Mazz.

== G ==
- Lysimachia glanduliflora Hanelt
- Lysimachia glaucina Franch.
- Lysimachia glutinosa Rock
- Lysimachia gracilipes (P.Taylor) U.Manns & Anderb.
- Lysimachia graminea (Greene) Hand.-Mazz.
- Lysimachia grammica Hance

== H ==
- Lysimachia hemsleyana Maxim. ex Oliv.
- Lysimachia hemsleyi Franch.
- Lysimachia henryi Hemsl.
- Lysimachia heterobotrys F.H.Chen & C.M.Hu
- Lysimachia heterogenea Klatt
- Lysimachia hexamera (P.Taylor) U.Manns & Anderb.
- Lysimachia hillebrandii Hook.f. ex A.Gray
- Lysimachia huangsangensis J.J.Zhou, X.L.Yu & Y.F.Deng
- Lysimachia huchimingii G.Hao & H.F.Yan
- Lysimachia huitsunae S.S.Chien
- Lysimachia huttonii (Harv.) U.Manns & Anderb.
- Lysimachia hybrida Michx.
- Lysimachia hypericoides Hemsl.

== I ==
- Lysimachia inaperta C.M.Hu & F.N.Wei
- Lysimachia iniki K.L.Marr
- Lysimachia insignis Hemsl.
- Lysimachia interjacens C.M.Hu & Bennell
- Lysimachia × intermedia (Giraudias) B.Bock

== J ==
- Lysimachia japonica Thunb.
- Lysimachia jiangxiensis C.M.Hu
- Lysimachia jingdongensis F.H.Chen & C.M.Hu
- Lysimachia jinzhaiensis S.B.Zhou & Kun Liu

== K ==
- Lysimachia kalalauensis Skottsb.
- Lysimachia kingaensis (Engl.) U.Manns & Anderb.
- Lysimachia klattiana Hance
- Lysimachia kochii (H.E.Hess) U.Manns & Anderb.
- Lysimachia kraduengensis Julius, Naiki & Tagane
- Lysimachia kwangtungensis (Hand.-Mazz.) C.M.Hu

== L ==
- Lysimachia lalashanensis S.S.Ying
- Lysimachia lanceola (Baudo) Hassemer, Funez & R.Trevis.
- Lysimachia lanceolata Walter
- Lysimachia lancifolia Craib
- Lysimachia latifolia (Hook.) Cholewa
- Lysimachia laxa Baudo
- Lysimachia leschenaultii Duby
- Lysimachia leucantha Miq.
- Lysimachia lewisii D.Estes, J.T.Shaw & Maus.-Moon.
- Lysimachia lichiangensis Forrest
- Lysimachia linearifolia Griff. ex Kurz
- Lysimachia linguiensis C.Z.Gao
- Lysimachia linum-stellatum L.
- Lysimachia liui S.S.Chien
- Lysimachia liujiangensis W.B.Xu, Z.C.Lu & L.N.Dong
- Lysimachia liukiuensis Hatus.
- Lysimachia lobelioides Wall.
- Lysimachia loeflingii F.J.Jiménez & M.Talavera
- Lysimachia longipes Hemsl.
- Lysimachia longshengensis G.Z.Li & S.C.Tang
- Lysimachia loomisii Torr.
- Lysimachia lychnoides F.H.Chen & C.M.Hu
- Lysimachia lydgatei Hillebr.

== M ==
- Lysimachia maritima (L.) Galasso, Banfi & Soldano
- Lysimachia mauritiana Lam.
- Lysimachia medogensis F.H.Chen & C.M.Hu
- Lysimachia melampyroides R.Knuth
- Lysimachia mexicana R.Knuth
- Lysimachia microcarpa Hand.-Mazz. ex C.Y.Wu
- Lysimachia millietii (H.Lév.) Hand.-Mazz.
- Lysimachia minima (L.) U.Manns & Anderb.
- Lysimachia minoricensis J.J.Rodr.
- Lysimachia miyiensis Y.I.Fang & C.Z.Cheng
- Lysimachia monelli (L.) U.Manns & Anderb.
- Lysimachia montana (Reinw.) Bakh.f.

== N ==
- Lysimachia nanchuanensis C.Y.Wu
- Lysimachia nanhutashanensis S.S.Ying
- Lysimachia nanpingensis F.H.Chen & C.M.Hu
- Lysimachia navillei (H.Lév.) Hand.-Mazz.
- Lysimachia nemorum L.
- Lysimachia neolongipedicellata Idrees & J.M.H.Shaw
- Lysimachia nummularia L.
- Lysimachia nummulariifolia (Baker) U.Manns & Anderb.
- Lysimachia nutans Nees ex Duby
- Lysimachia nutantiflora F.H.Chen & C.M.Hu

== O ==
- Lysimachia ohsumiensis H.Hara
- Lysimachia oligantha (P.Taylor) U.Manns & Anderb.
- Lysimachia omeiensis Hemsl.
- Lysimachia ophelioides Hemsl.
- Lysimachia oppositifolia H.R.Fletcher
- Lysimachia orbicularis F.H.Chen & C.M.Hu
- Lysimachia otophora C.Y.Wu
- Lysimachia ovalis (Ruiz & Pav.) U.Manns & Anderb.
- Lysimachia ovatifolia W.L.Sha

== P ==
- Lysimachia pacifica F.Muell.
- Lysimachia paridiformis Franch.
- Lysimachia parvifolia Hemsl.
- Lysimachia parvula Funez, Hassemer & R.Trevis.
- Lysimachia patungensis Hand.-Mazz.
- Lysimachia peduncularis Wall. ex Kurz
- Lysimachia pendens K.L.Marr
- Lysimachia pentapetala Bunge
- Lysimachia peploides (Baker) U.Manns & Anderb.
- Lysimachia perfoliata Hand.-Mazz.
- Lysimachia petelotii Merr.
- Lysimachia phyllocephala Hand.-Mazz.
- Lysimachia physaloides C.Y.Wu & C.Chen
- Lysimachia × pilophora (Honda) Honda
- Lysimachia pilosa H.R.Fletcher
- Lysimachia pittosporoides C.Y.Wu
- Lysimachia platypetala Franch.
- Lysimachia porcatisepala S.R.Yi
- Lysimachia × producta (A.Gray) Fernald
- Lysimachia prolifera Klatt
- Lysimachia pseudohenryi Pamp.
- Lysimachia pseudotrichopoda Hand.-Mazz.
- Lysimachia pterantha Hemsl.
- Lysimachia pteranthoides Bonati
- Lysimachia pumila (Baudo) Franch.
- Lysimachia punctata L.
- Lysimachia punctatilimba C.Y.Wu
- Lysimachia pyramidalis Wall.

== Q ==
- Lysimachia qimenensis X.H.Guo, X.P.Zhang & J.W.Shao
- Lysimachia quadriflora Sims
- Lysimachia quadrifolia L.

== R ==
- Lysimachia racemiflora Bonati
- Lysimachia × radfordii H.E.Ahles
- Lysimachia radicans Hook.
- Lysimachia rapensis F.Br.
- Lysimachia ravenii C.I Peng
- Lysimachia reflexiloba Hand.-Mazz.
- Lysimachia remota Petitm.
- Lysimachia remotiflora C.M.Hu
- Lysimachia remyi Hillebr.
- Lysimachia rhodesica (R.E.Fr.) U.Manns & Anderb.
- Lysimachia robusta Hand.-Mazz.
- Lysimachia roseola F.H.Chen & C.M.Hu
- Lysimachia rubiginosa Hemsl.
- Lysimachia rubinervis F.H.Chen & C.M.Hu
- Lysimachia rubricaulis (Duby) U.Manns & Anderb.
- Lysimachia ruhmeriana Vatke
- Lysimachia rupestris F.H.Chen & C.M.Hu

== S ==
- Lysimachia santapaui Subba Rao & Halim
- Lysimachia savranii Başköse & A.Keskin
- Lysimachia saxicola Chun & F.Chun
- Lysimachia scapiflora C.M.Hu, Z.R.Xu & F.P.Chen
- Lysimachia schliebenii (R.Knuth & Mildbr.) U.Manns & Anderb.
- Lysimachia sciadantha C.Y.Wu
- Lysimachia sciadophylla F.H.Chen & C.M.Hu
- Lysimachia scopulensis K.L.Marr
- Lysimachia septemfida Ze H.Wang & E.D.Liu
- Lysimachia serpens (Hochst. ex Duby) U.Manns & Anderb.
- Lysimachia serpyllifolia Schreb.
- Lysimachia sertulata Baudo
- Lysimachia shimianensis F.H.Chen & C.M.Hu
- Lysimachia siamensis Bonati
- Lysimachia sikokiana Miq.
- Lysimachia silvestrii (Pamp.) Hand.-Mazz.
- Lysimachia sinopilosa C.M.Hu & G.Hao
- Lysimachia stellarioides Hand.-Mazz.
- Lysimachia stenosepala Hemsl.
- Lysimachia steyermarkii Standl.
- Lysimachia stigmatosa F.H.Chen & C.M.Hu
- Lysimachia subverticillata C.Y.Wu
- Lysimachia sumatranica C.M.Hu

== T ==
- Lysimachia talaverae L.Sáez & Aymerich
- Lysimachia taliensis Bonati
- Lysimachia tashiroi Makino
- Lysimachia tenella L.
- Lysimachia tengyuehensis Hand.-Mazz.
- Lysimachia tenuicaulis (Baker) U.Manns & Anderb.
- Lysimachia terrestris (L.) Britton, Sterns & Poggenb.
- Lysimachia thyrsiflora L.
- Lysimachia tianmaensis Kun Liu, S.B.Zhou & Ying Wang
- Lysimachia tianyangensis D.Fang & C.Z.Gao
- Lysimachia tienmushanensis Migo
- Lysimachia tonsa (Alph.Wood) R.Knuth
- Lysimachia trichopoda Franch.
- Lysimachia trifida Aver.
- Lysimachia tsaii C.M.Hu
- Lysimachia tsaratananae (M.Peltier) U.Manns & Anderb.
- Lysimachia tsarongensis Hand.-Mazz.
- Lysimachia tyrrhenia U.Manns & Anderb.

== V ==
- Lysimachia venosa (Wawra) H.St.John
- Lysimachia verbascifolia C.M.Hu & L.K.Phan
- Lysimachia verna (A.St.-Hil.) U.Manns & Anderb.
- Lysimachia verticillaris Biehler
- Lysimachia vietnamensis L.K.Phan & C.M.Hu
- Lysimachia violascens Franch.
- Lysimachia vittiformis F.H.Chen & C.M.Hu
- Lysimachia volkensii Engl.
- Lysimachia volkovae Prob.
- Lysimachia vulgaris L.

== W ==
- Lysimachia wildpretii (Valdés) U.Manns & Anderb.
- Lysimachia wilsonii Hemsl.

== X ==
- Lysimachia xiangxiensis D.G.Zhang, C.Mou & Y.Wu
- Lysimachia xuyongensis X.F.Gao & W.B.Ju

== Y ==
- Lysimachia yingdeensis F.H.Chen & C.M.Hu
