= Yellow loosestrife =

Yellow loosestrife is a common name for several plants in the genus Lysimachia and may refer to:

- Lysimachia × commixta, native to eastern North America
- Lysimachia punctata
- Lysimachia vulgaris, native to Europe
