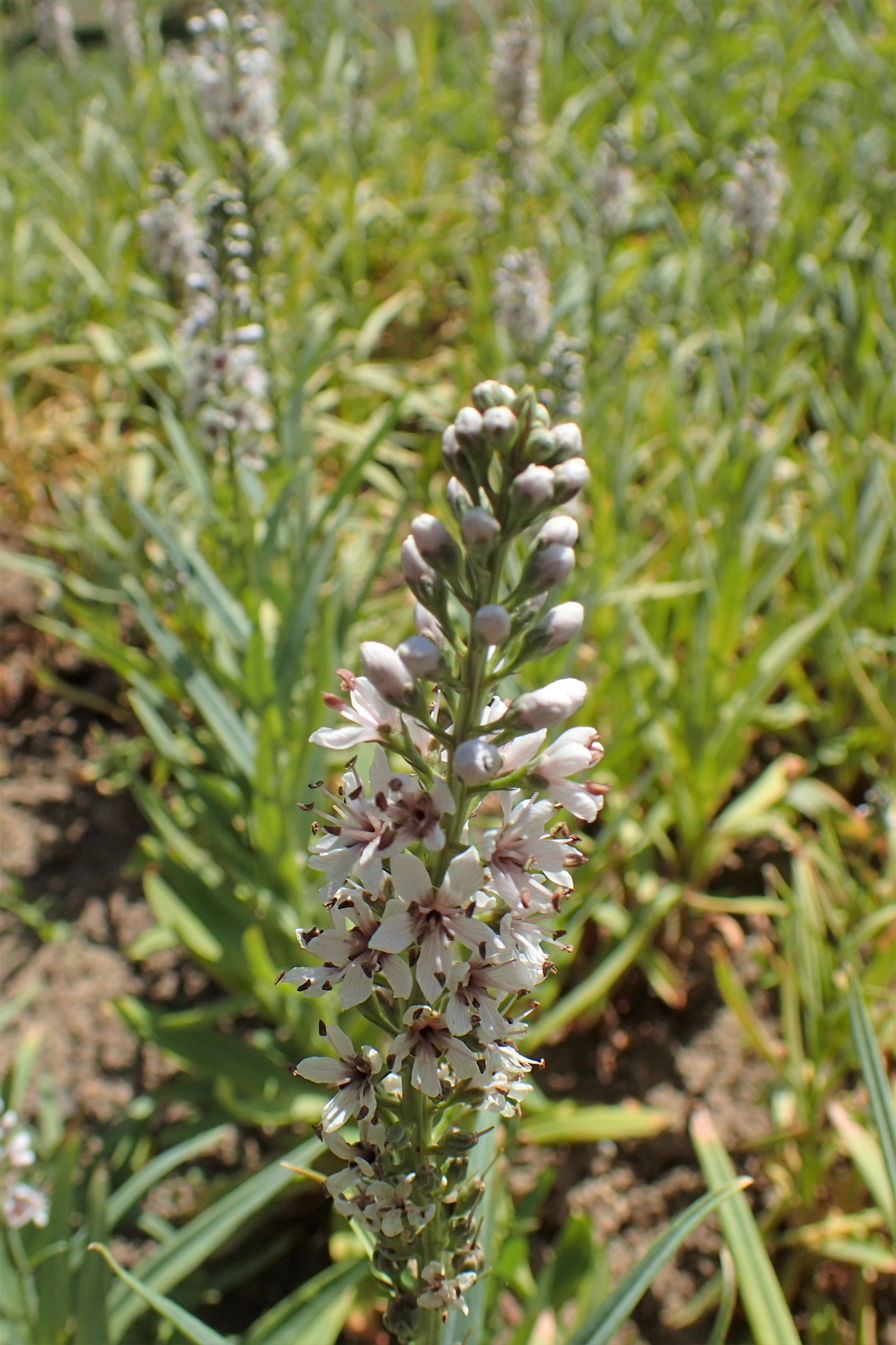

Scientific classification
- Kingdom: Plantae
- Clade: Tracheophytes
- Clade: Angiosperms
- Clade: Eudicots
- Clade: Asterids
- Order: Ericales
- Family: Primulaceae
- Genus: Lysimachia
- Species: L. ephemerum

Binomial name
- Lysimachia ephemerum L.

= Lysimachia ephemerum =

Species of flowering plant

Lysimachia ephemerum, the willow-leaved loosestrife or milky loosestrife, is a species of flowering plant in the primrose family Primulaceae, native to France, Spain, Portugal and Morocco. Against grey-green foliage this hardy herbaceous perennial bears erect racemes of delicate white flowers with purple stamens on 1 m (3.3 ft) stems in early summer. It is cultivated as an ornamental plant, and holds the Royal Horticultural Society's Award of Garden Merit. It requires a position in full sun, and reliably moist soil.

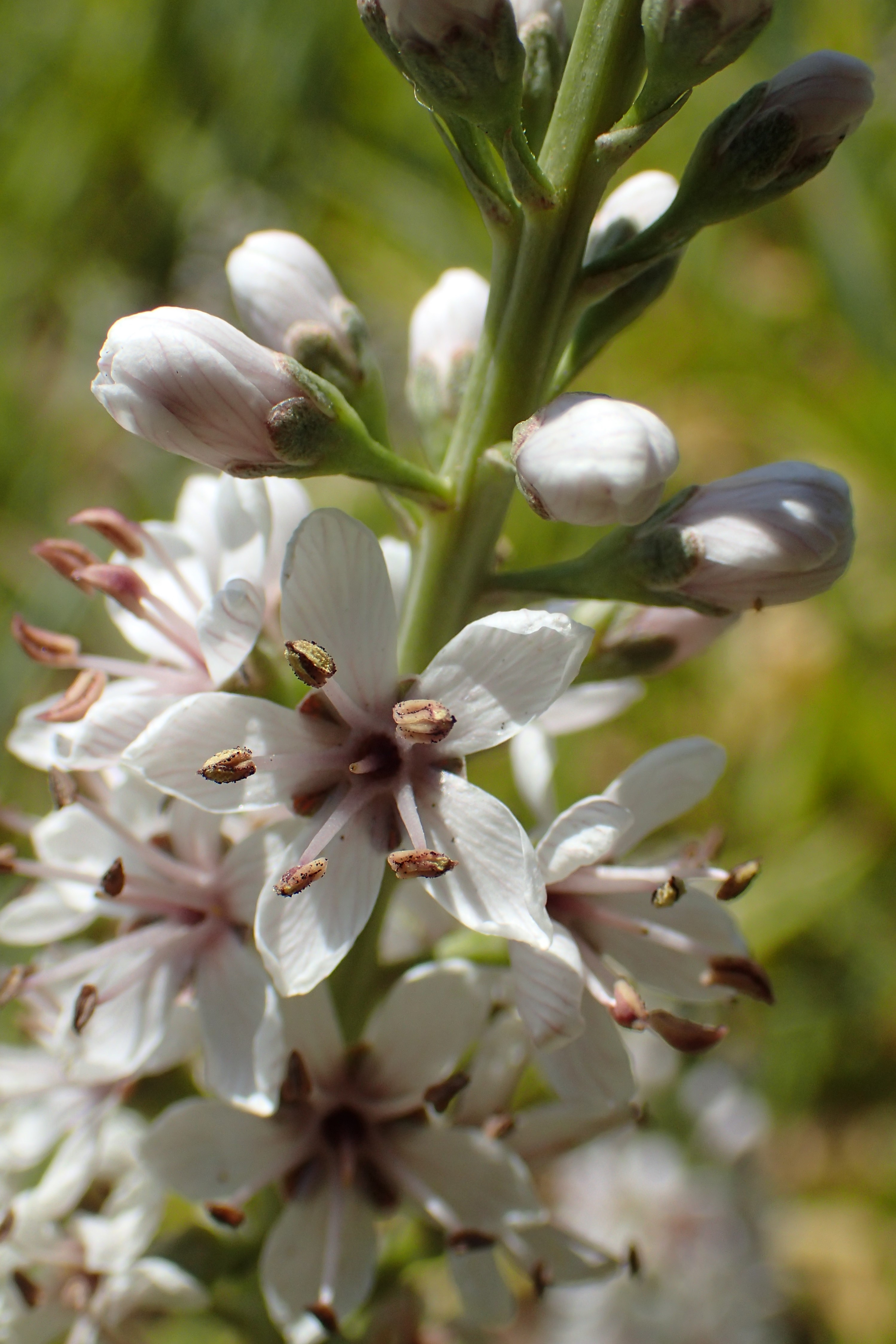

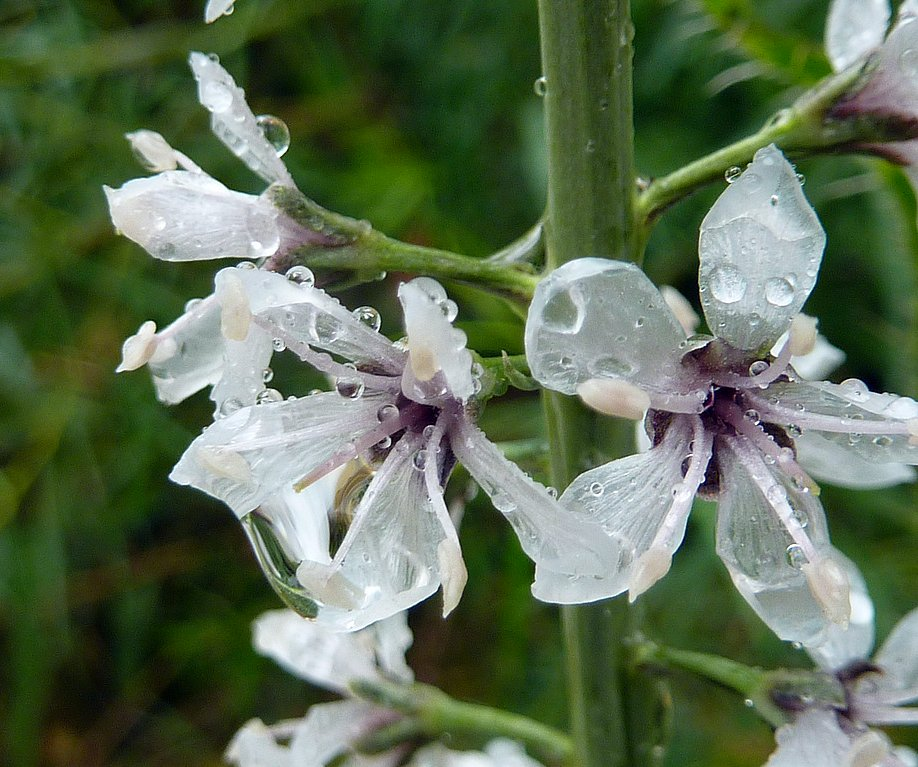
