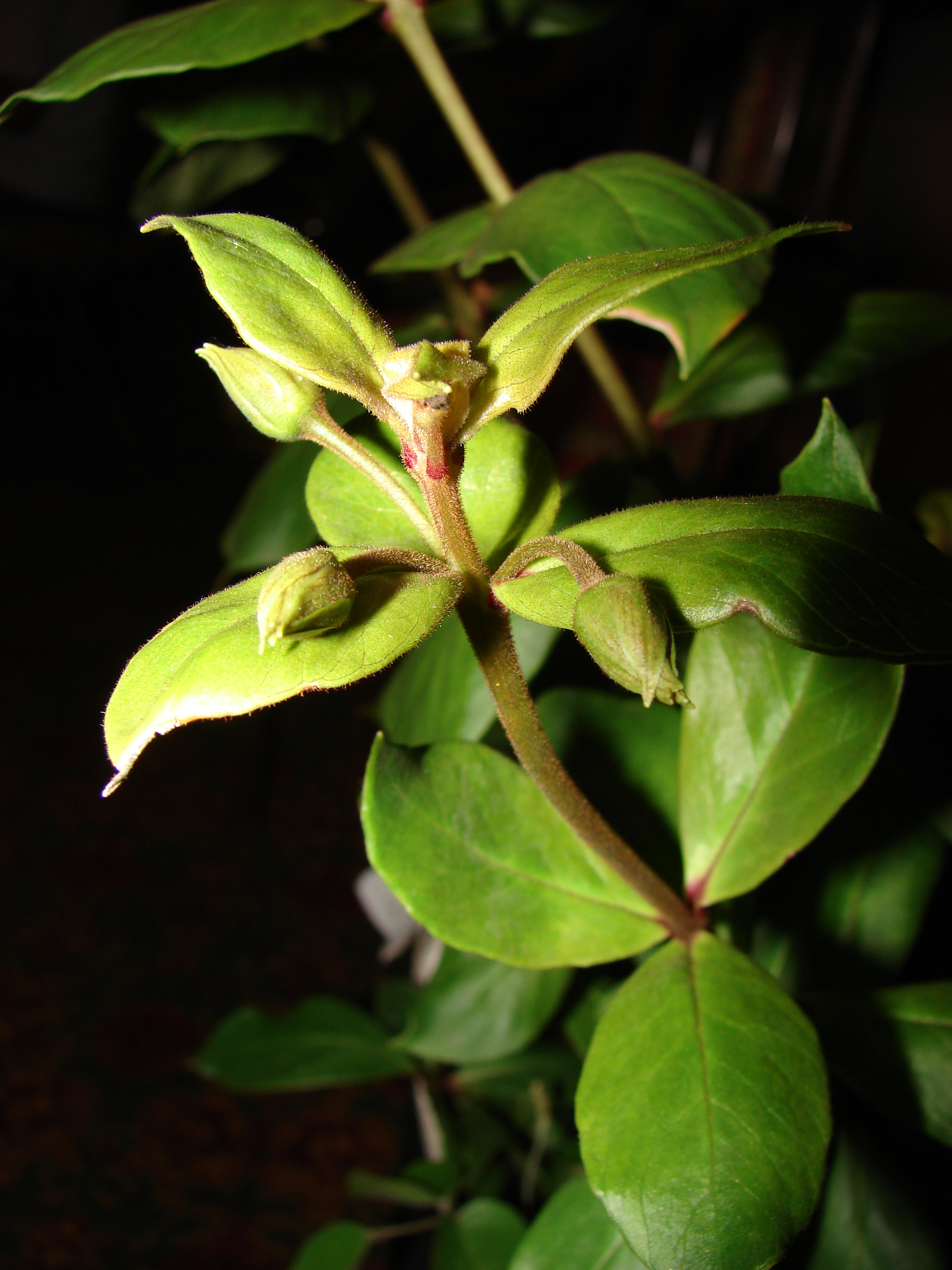

Conservation status
- Critically Imperiled (NatureServe)

Scientific classification
- Kingdom: Plantae
- Clade: Tracheophytes
- Clade: Angiosperms
- Clade: Eudicots
- Clade: Asterids
- Order: Ericales
- Family: Primulaceae
- Genus: Lysimachia
- Species: L. remyi
- Subspecies: L. r. subsp. maxima

Trinomial name
- Lysimachia remyi subsp. maxima (Masam.) I.C.Oh & Anderb. (2013)

Synonyms
- Lysimachia hillebrandii var. maxima Masam. (1905); Lysimachia maxima (Masam.) H.St.John (1987); Lysimachia ternifolia H.St.John (1987)

= Lysimachia remyi subsp. maxima =

Subspecies of flowering plant

Lysimachia remyi subsp. maxima is a rare species of flowering plant in the family Primulaceae known by the common name Pelekunu Trail yellow loosestrife. It is endemic to Hawaii, where there are only two small populations remaining on the island of Molokai. It is federally listed as an endangered species of the United States.

This is a shrub with sprawling branches lined with leaves growing in clusters of three. The solitary flowers are purple in color. The plant grows only in the wet forests of the Pelekunu Mountains of Molokai. The most recent surveys revealed a total of twenty individuals, ten in each of the two populations.

The plant is threatened by the invasion of introduced species of animals such as feral pigs and feral goats, and plants such as Koster's curse (Clidemia hirta) in its habitat. The plant is vulnerable because of its small numbers; a single event could conceivably cause its extinction.

Officials have released the leaf-eating insect Lius poseidon into the habitat as an agent of biological pest control against Koster's curse. It is too early to determine how successful this effort has been.
