= Lysimachia lydgatei =

Conservation status
- Critically Imperiled (NatureServe)

Scientific classification
- Kingdom: Plantae
- Clade: Tracheophytes
- Clade: Angiosperms
- Clade: Eudicots
- Clade: Asterids
- Order: Ericales
- Family: Primulaceae
- Genus: Lysimachia
- Species: L. lydgatei

Binomial name
- Lysimachia lydgatei Hillebr.

Species of flowering plant

Lysimachia lydgatei is a rare species of flowering plant in the family Primulaceae known by the common name Maui yellow loosestrife. It is endemic to Hawaii, where there are only four occurrences remaining on the island of Maui, the total number of plants under 300. It is federally listed as an endangered species of the United States.

This is a shrub growing up to 1.3 meters long and bearing solitary flowers. It grows in moist or wet shrublands on three ridges on West Maui. It is always found alongside its relative, Lysimachia remyi.

The plant is threatened by the invasion of non-native plant species in its habitat.
