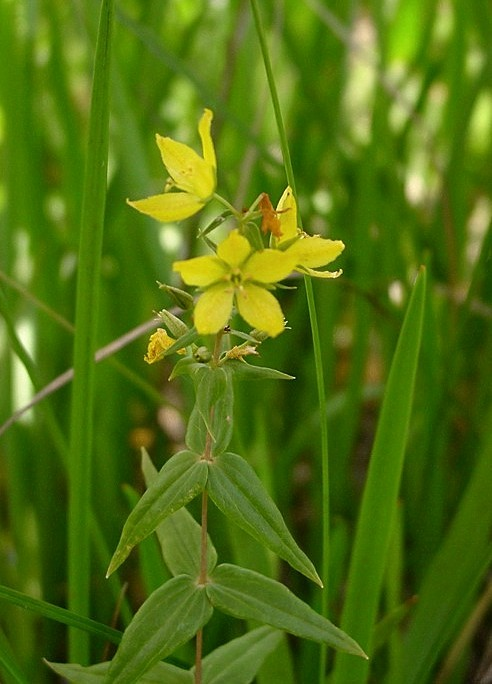

Conservation status
- Vulnerable (NatureServe)

Scientific classification
- Kingdom: Plantae
- Clade: Tracheophytes
- Clade: Angiosperms
- Clade: Eudicots
- Clade: Asterids
- Order: Ericales
- Family: Primulaceae
- Genus: Lysimachia
- Species: L. asperulifolia

Binomial name
- Lysimachia asperulifolia Poir.

= Lysimachia asperulifolia =

Species of plant

Lysimachia asperulifolia (orth. var. L. asperulaefolia) is a rare species of flowering plant in the Primulaceae known by the common name rough-leaved loosestrife and roughleaf yellow loosestrife. It is endemic to the Atlantic coastal plain in North Carolina and northern South Carolina in the United States, where there are 64 known populations. It is a federally listed endangered species of the United States.

== Description ==
This plant is a rhizomatous perennial herb growing erect to a maximum height around 60 to 70 centimeters. The lower stem is pinkish in color and ribbed, and the upper stem is yellowish and lacks ribs. The stem in the inflorescence is covered in reddish glands. The leaves are green, lance-shaped, and up to 5 centimeters long by 2 wide. They are borne in whorls of three or four around the stem, or sometimes in opposite pairs. The leaves are not rough in texture as the common name would suggest. Smaller, tougher, brown-colored leaves are opposite or borne in whorls of up to 7 near the stem base. The top of the stem is occupied by the inflorescence, which is a raceme of star-shaped yellow flowers interspersed with leaflike green bracts. Each flower has 4 to 7, but usually five, yellow petals with wide bases and pointed, ragged tips. The petals and green sepals are dotted with red glands and streaked with reddish resin canals. The fruit is a red-mottled straw-colored capsule a few millimeters in length.

== Habitat ==
This herb grows in a number of plant communities on the coastal plains of southern North Carolina and northern South Carolina, including pocosins, sandhills, pine flatwoods and pine savannas. It is most commonly found in open areas in the ecotone between longleaf pine uplands and pond pine pocosins. The soil is seasonally wet to waterlogged or submerged, low in nutrients, rich in peat over sandy substrates. The plant is found in sections of these habitat types which, in their pristine state, are openings in a dense layer of shrubs which are kept open by severe periodic wildfires. Fire prevents ecological succession, maintaining a type of ecosystem in which the taller vegetation is kept small and sparse, allowing the herb layer to flourish in the sun. Trees, shrubs, and ferns in the area include Aronia arbutifolia (chokeberry), Clethra alnifolia (summersweet), Cyrilla racemiflora (titi), Fothergilla gardenii (dwarf fothergilla), Ilex glabra (Appalachian tea), Magnolia virginiana (sweetbay), Osmunda cinnamomea (cinnamon fern), Persea palustris (swampbay), Symplocos tinctoria (yellowwood), and Vaccinium species (wild blueberries). Herbs, grasses, and mosses associated with this ecosystem include Andropogon glomeratus (bushy bluestem), Aristida stricta (wiregrass), Drosera intermedia (oblong-leaved sundew), Drosera capillaris (pink sundew), Lachnanthes caroliniana (redroot), Peltandra sagittifolia (spoon flower), Sarracenia flava (yellow pitcher plant), and Sphagnum species (sphagnum mosses).

In the 1980s the only known viable populations of the plant were located in Green Swamp Nature Preserve and the Croatan National Forest, and at Military Ocean Terminal Sunny Point. Another was located on Fort Bragg. A program of prescribed fire was instituted on military base territory in the region to preserve habitat for the red-cockaded woodpecker (Picoides borealis). This habitat was appropriate for the plant as well, and as a result some additional populations appeared where it had been crowded out by vegetation overgrowth before. One such population is located at Camp Lejeune, and more occurrences grew at Fort Bragg. The South Carolina occurrence is located on Fort Jackson. In 1995 there were 64 populations known. Because the plant usually reproduces vegetatively by sprouting from its rhizome, creating clones, what appears to be a large population may actually be relatively few genetic individuals with many cloned stems above the ground.

== Environmental issues ==
The main threat to the species is the loss and degradation of its habitat. Much of the land in the region has been developed, the wetlands drained and dried to create land for residential, industrial, and recreational purposes. Habitat that remains is improperly managed, becoming degraded as the natural fire regime is prevented. As fire suppression practices have been implemented, the pocosins, sandhills, and swamps have overgrown with brush and woody vegetation. Shrubs are not kept back and they grow to large sizes and shade out the smaller plants in the herb layer. Even where fire is prescribed or allowed to take place, pocosins do not burn thoroughly enough to remove the heavy organic layers that accumulate there. Activities involved with fire may also be detrimental, as firebreaks are often plowed in the very ecotone openings where the plant most often grows. Agriculture, including pine plantations, and other types of operations alter the hydrology of the wetlands, making conditions unsuitable for this and other native plants. Many of the populations are located on military bases and are vulnerable to destruction during military operations.
