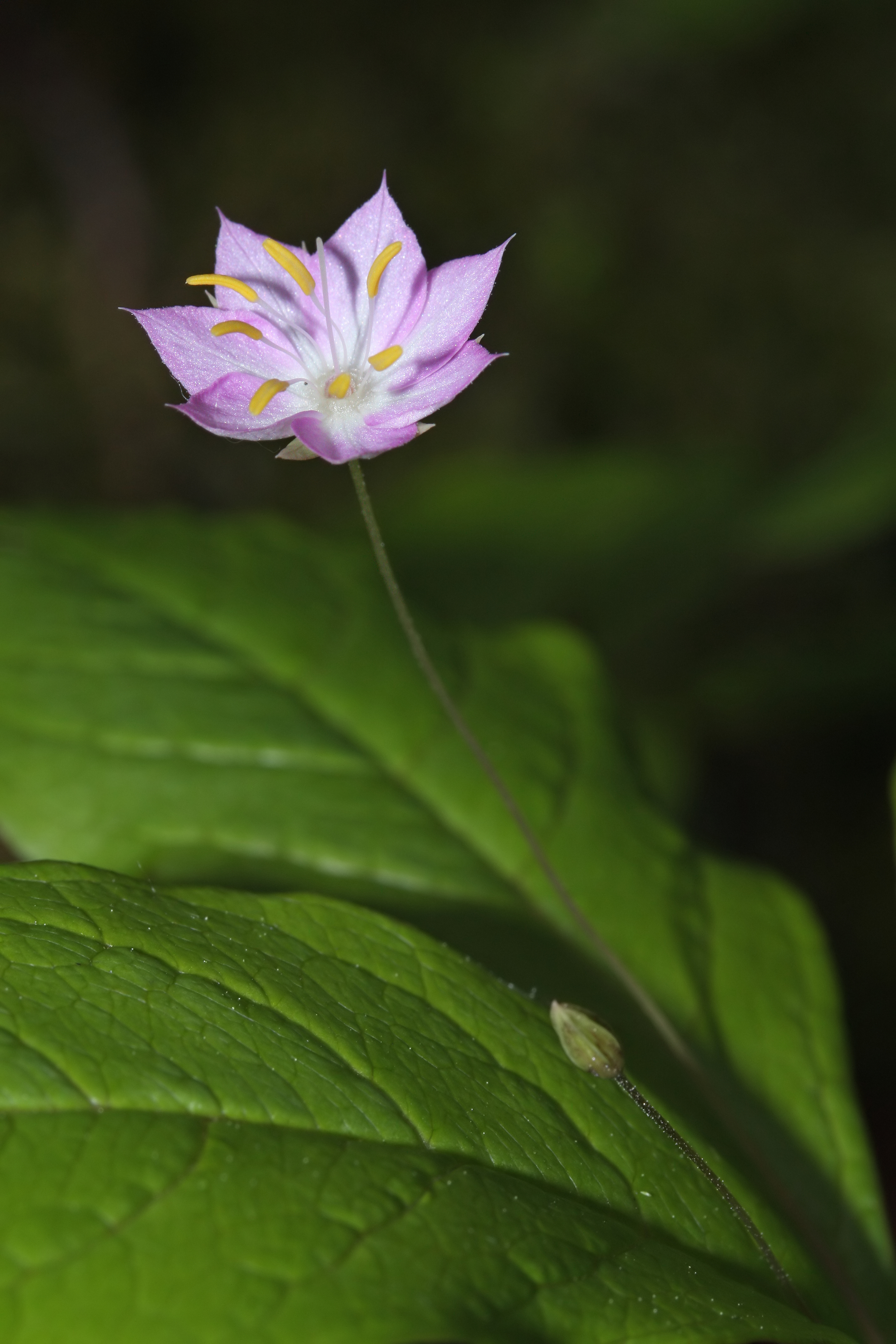
- At Squak Mountain State Park

Scientific classification
- Kingdom: Plantae
- Clade: Tracheophytes
- Clade: Angiosperms
- Clade: Eudicots
- Clade: Asterids
- Order: Ericales
- Family: Primulaceae
- Genus: Lysimachia
- Species: L. latifolia

Binomial name
- Lysimachia latifolia (Hook.) Cholewa

Synonyms
- Trientalis borealis ssp. latifolia (Hook.) Hultén; Trientalis europaea var. latifolia (Hook.) Torr.; Trientalis europaea ssp. latifolia (Hook.) A.E.Murray; Trientalis latifolia Hook.

= Lysimachia latifolia =

Species of flowering plant

Lysimachia latifolia, sometimes called Trientalis latifolia, is a species of flowering plant in the family Primulaceae. It is known as starflower, chickweed-wintergreen, or Pacific starflower.

== Description ==
It is a low-growing, creeping perennial reaching (5 to 30 cm (2.0 to 11.8 in)). The roots are tuberous, creeping rhizomes. The stems are erect, 10–20 cm (4–8 in) high. It has 5 to 7 whorled, lanceolate, entire leaves distributed levelly in a single group.

The white or pink flowers are borne in April or May. The Calyx (the collective term for sepals) is 5- to 9-parted and persistent, and the corolla (the collective term for petals) is also 5- to 9-parted, rotate, with a very short tube and elliptic-lanceolate segments. Stamens occur in the same number as the corolla lobes (5–9) and are positioned opposite to them. 1-3 peduncles, 1-flowered, filiform, and ebracteate. The ovary is one-celled. The style (gynoecium) is filiform.

== Habitat ==
Occurs on moist, shaded slopes in deep, light soil rich in organic matter, particularly leaf mould.

== Distribution ==
- Canada: Occurs in British Columbia, Alberta, and Yukon.
- United States of America: Occurs throughout Washington, Idaho, Oregon, and northern California.

== Etymology ==
The former genus name Trientalis is derived from the Latin triens ('a third'), and is an allusion to the height of the plant, which is one third of a foot, or 4 in (10 cm) high. Latifolia is derived from the Latin words latus ('broad or wide') and folia ('leaves') and means approximately 'broad-leaved'.

The alternative name "Indian potato" refers to a small subterranean swelling at the stem's base, which is not listed as being edible by modern sources.
