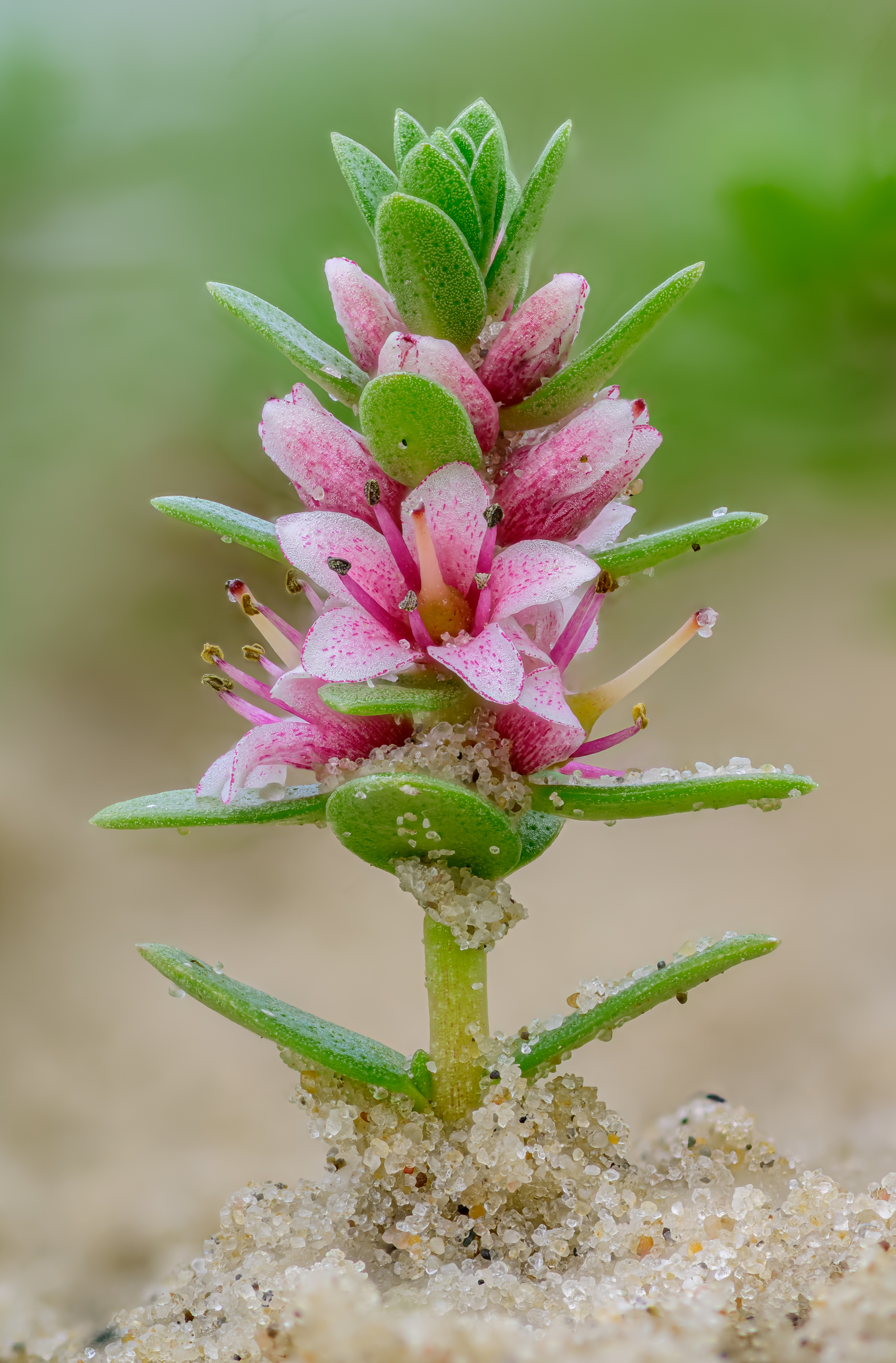
- Norderney, Lower Saxon Wadden Sea National Park

Conservation status
- Least Concern (IUCN 3.1)

- Secure (NatureServe)

Scientific classification
- Kingdom: Plantae
- Clade: Tracheophytes
- Clade: Angiosperms
- Clade: Eudicots
- Clade: Asterids
- Order: Ericales
- Family: Primulaceae
- Genus: Lysimachia
- Species: L. maritima

Binomial name
- Lysimachia maritima (L.) Galasso, Banfi & Soldano

Synonyms
- Glaux maritima L.

= Lysimachia maritima =

Species of flowering plant in the primrose family

Lysimachia maritima is a species of flowering plant belonging to the family Primulaceae. It was previously called Glaux maritima, the only species in the monotypic genus Glaux. The species has a number of common names, including sea milkwort, sea milkweed, and black saltwort.

== Distribution and habitat ==
Lysimachia maritima has a circumpolar distribution in the northern hemisphere and is native to Europe, central Asia and North America. the species grows mainly in coastal habitats in Europe but also occurs in mesic interior habitats in Asia and North America, in both wet ground and water. It is known from alkaline meadows in desert regions in Utah, at elevations of up to 2600 m (8500 ft).

== Description ==
Lysimachia maritima (commonly called Sea Milkwort, Sea Milkweed, or Black Saltwort) is a coastal wildflower in the primrose family (Primulaceae). It was formerly named Glaux maritima and was the only species in the genus Glaux before modern DNA studies moved it into the genus Lysimachia. This plant differs from all other genera of the Primulaceae in having apetalous flowers with a pink or white, petaloid calyx. It is generally pentamerous both in the calyx and the seed capsule. The leaves are fleshy, simple and opposite.
