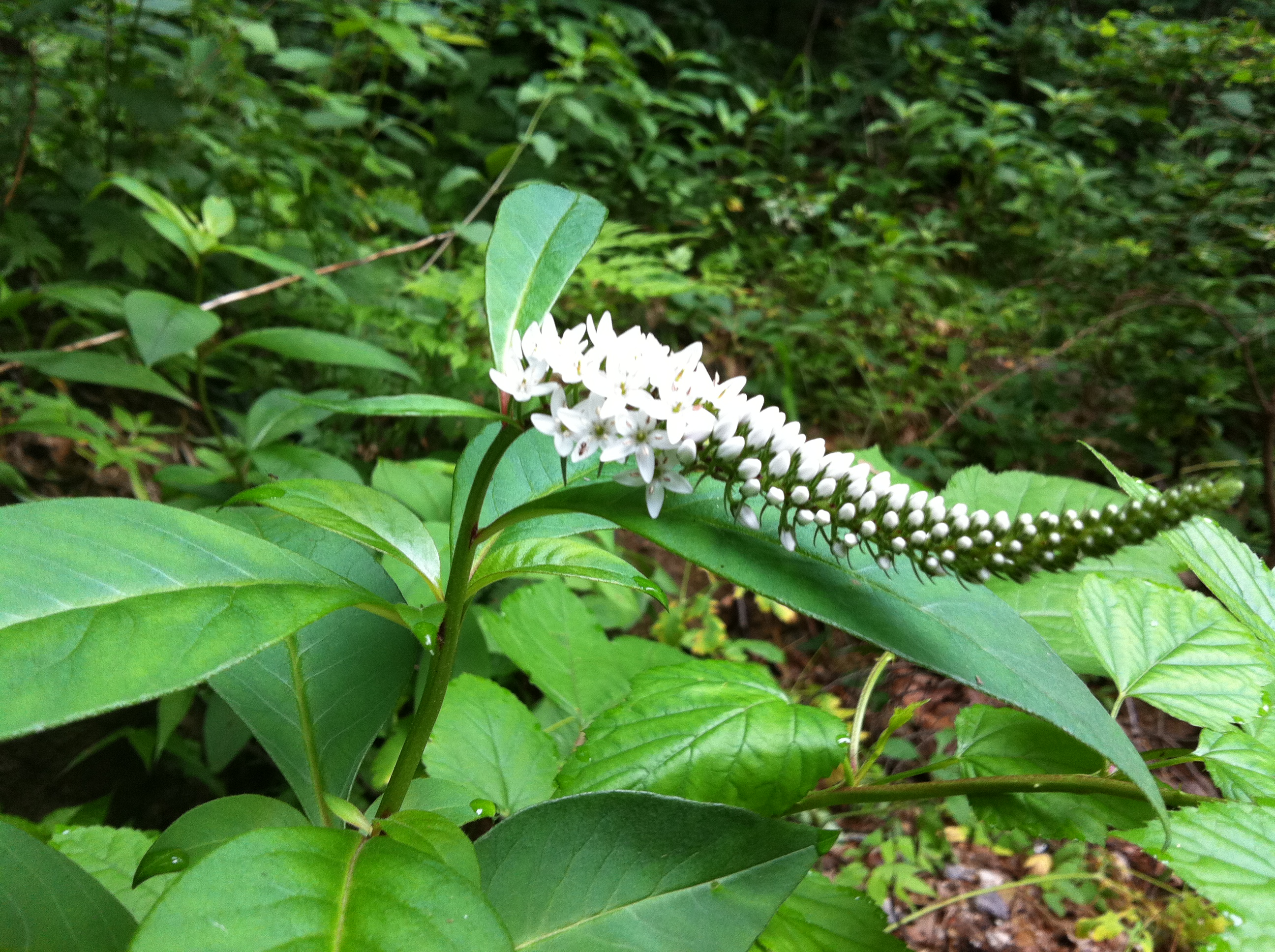
- In bloom in South Korea

Scientific classification
- Kingdom: Plantae
- Clade: Embryophytes
- Clade: Tracheophytes
- Clade: Spermatophytes
- Clade: Angiosperms
- Clade: Eudicots
- Clade: Asterids
- Order: Ericales
- Family: Primulaceae
- Genus: Lysimachia
- Species: L. barystachys

Binomial name
- Lysimachia barystachys Bunge

Synonyms
- Bernardina pubescens Baudo; Lysimachia barystachys var. quelpaertensis (K.Tae & Jae S.Lee) M.Kim; Lysimachia piccolii Hemsl. ex R.Knuth; Lysimachia quelpaertensis K.Tae & Jae S.Lee

= Lysimachia barystachys =

Species of flowering plant

Lysimachia barystachys, the Manchurian yellow loosestrife, is a species of flowering plant in the family Primulaceae. It is widely distributed in northern, eastern and central China, Far Eastern Russia, the Korean Peninsula and Japan, and has been introduced in the US state of Georgia. It has gained the Royal Horticultural Society's Award of Garden Merit.
