= Lysimachia scopulensis =

Conservation status
- Critically Imperiled (NatureServe)

Scientific classification
- Kingdom: Plantae
- Clade: Tracheophytes
- Clade: Angiosperms
- Clade: Eudicots
- Clade: Asterids
- Order: Ericales
- Family: Primulaceae
- Genus: Lysimachia
- Species: L. scopulensis

Binomial name
- Lysimachia scopulensis Marr

Species of flowering plant

Lysimachia scopulensis is a rare species of flowering plant in the family Primulaceae known by the common name shiny-leaf yellow loosestrife. It is endemic to Hawaii, where there are two small populations on the island of Kauai. It was federally listed as an endangered species of the United States in 2010.

This shrub was discovered in 1991 in Kalalau Valley on Kauai. It was described as a new species in 1997. It grows on cliffs.

This shrub has red or green branches up to 75 centimeters long. The closely spaced leaves are lance-shaped to nearly oval in shape and have curved tips. The leaves are dark green but the central vein and the petiole may be red in color. The flower has red petals each about a centimeter long. This species sometimes hybridizes with Lysimachia glutinosa.

The two populations of this rare plant contain no more than 30 individuals in total.

The plant is threatened by the invasion of introduced species of plants and feral goats.
