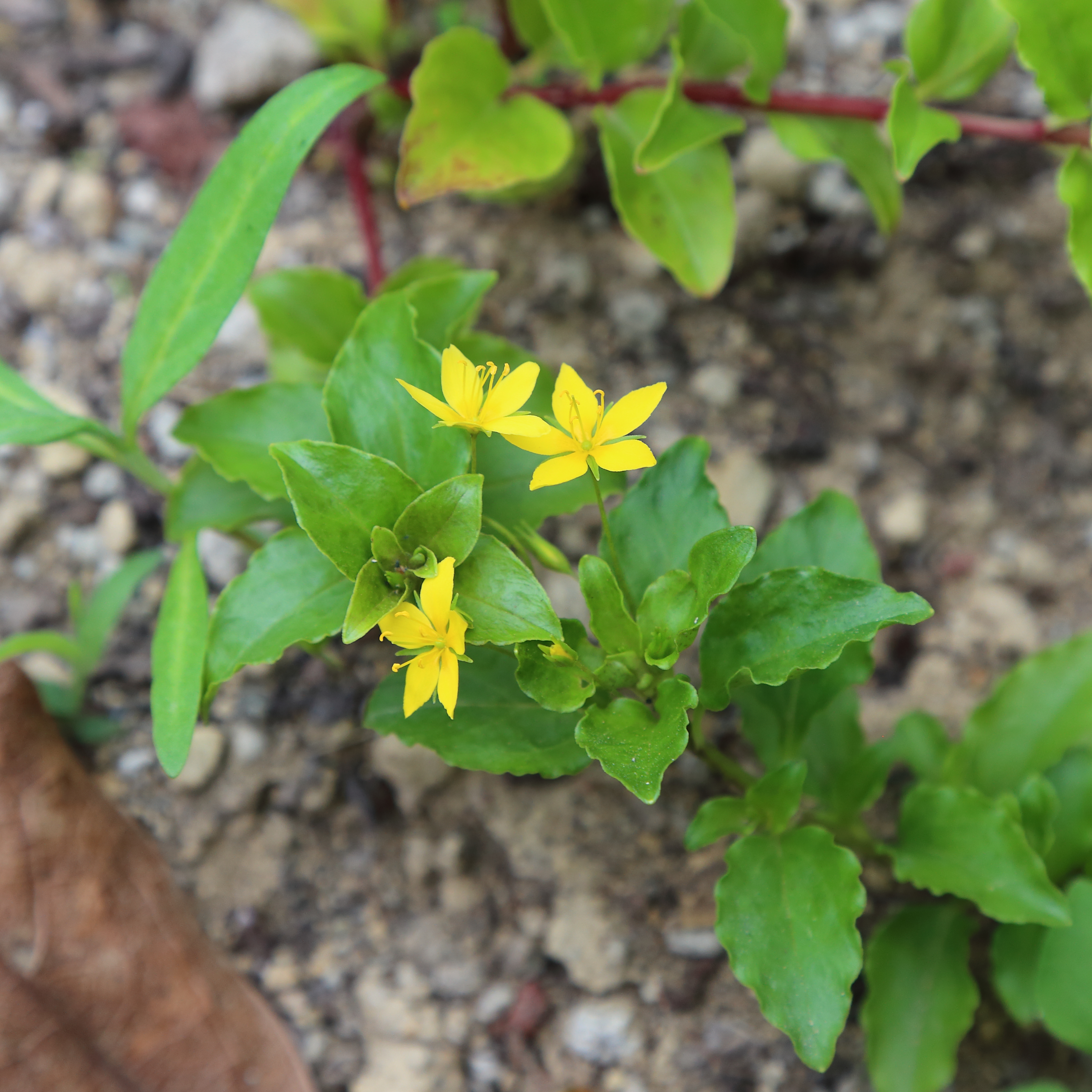

Scientific classification
- Kingdom: Plantae
- Clade: Tracheophytes
- Clade: Angiosperms
- Clade: Eudicots
- Clade: Asterids
- Order: Ericales
- Family: Primulaceae
- Genus: Lysimachia
- Species: L. azorica

Binomial name
- Lysimachia azorica Hornem. ex Hook.

= Lysimachia azorica =

Species of flowering plant

Lysimachia azorica is a species of flowering plant in the family Primulaceae. It is endemic to the Azores, Portugal and is commonly found in woods, shrubland, forest plantations, embankments, roadsides and paths, in Sphagnum formations, at altitudes generally above 200 m (660 ft). It is present in all of the nine Azorean islands.
