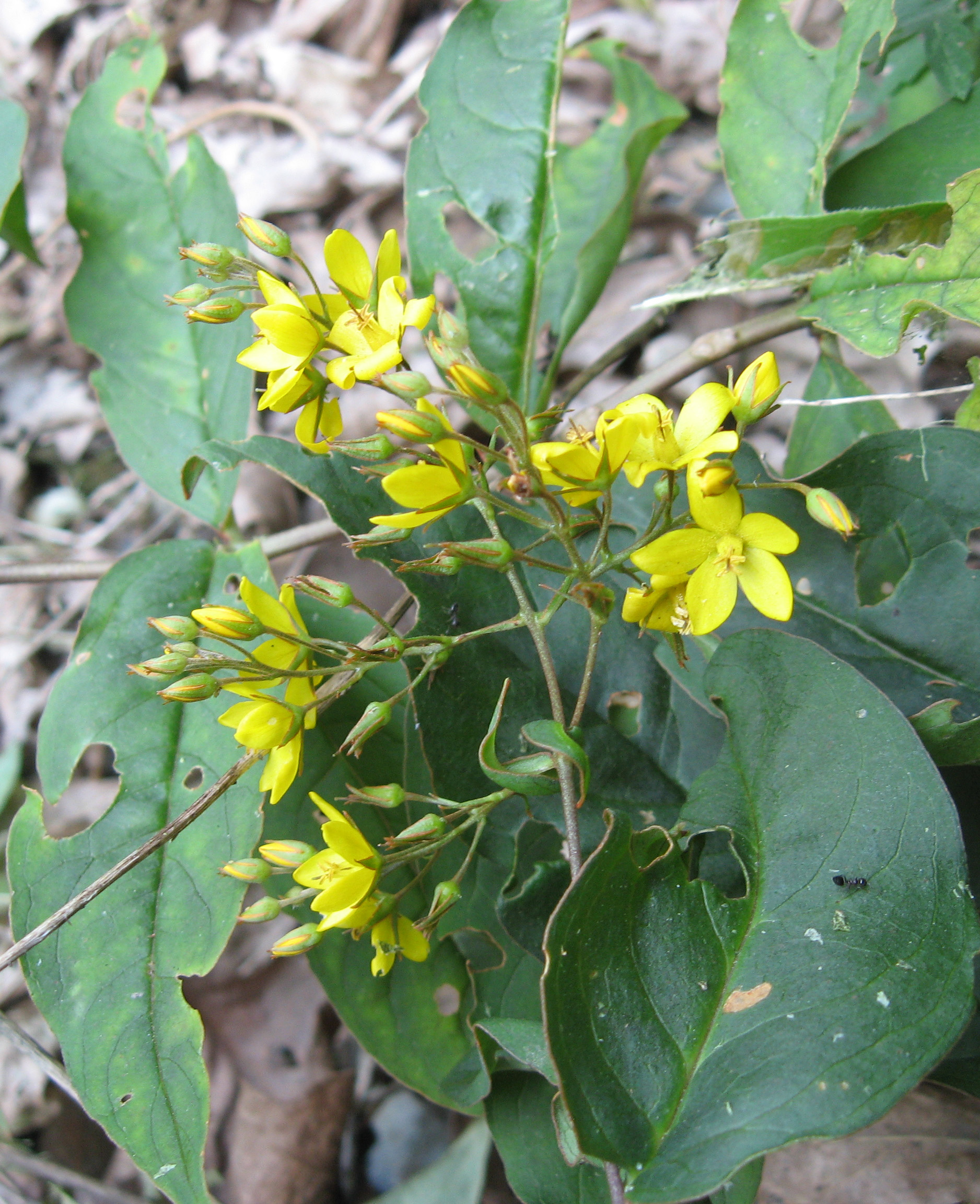

Conservation status
- Vulnerable (NatureServe)

Scientific classification
- Kingdom: Plantae
- Clade: Tracheophytes
- Clade: Angiosperms
- Clade: Eudicots
- Clade: Asterids
- Order: Ericales
- Family: Primulaceae
- Genus: Lysimachia
- Species: L. fraseri

Binomial name
- Lysimachia fraseri Duby

= Lysimachia fraseri =

Species of flowering plant

Lysimachia fraseri is a rare species of flowering plant in the primrose family known by the common name Fraser's yellow loosestrife. It is native to the Southeastern United States, where it is listed as an endangered species in several states.

== Description ==
Lysimachia fraseri is a rhizomatous perennial herb reaching about 1 metre (3.3 ft) in maximum height, or taller in moist conditions. It has a slender, erect stem coated in black-tipped glandular hairs, especially near each whorl of leaves. The whorls are composed of 3 to 6 leaves each on the upper stem, and the leaves toward the base are paired oppositely. The leaves are lance-shaped to nearly oval in shape and up to 15 centimeters long. They are dotted with black glands and there is a narrow but usually distinct dark or reddish strip along the margin of each leaf.

The inflorescence is up to 25 centimeters long with many flowers, each just over a centimeter wide. The lance-shaped sepals are glandular and outlined in red like the leaves. The flat face of the flower is made up of five yellow oval petals. The fruit is a capsule containing many brown seeds.

This species is similar in appearance to other Lysimachia species; it can often be distinguished from them by its solid yellow petals and the granular appearance of the glandular hairs on its upper stem and foliage.

== Distribution ==
Lysimachia fraseri grows in areas near water, such as gravelly river banks and ditches, and thrives in disturbed areas, undergoing cycles of increase and decrease as it takes over cleared land and is shaded out by taller plants. When the growing plant is exposed to sun through a break in the canopy it grows robustly.

Plants growing in shaded situations are often sterile. As the species depends on the sunlight in open areas for its fertility, human suppression of wildfire leading to the overgrowth of canopy is a threat to its success. This species is named for the Scottish botanist John Fraser.
