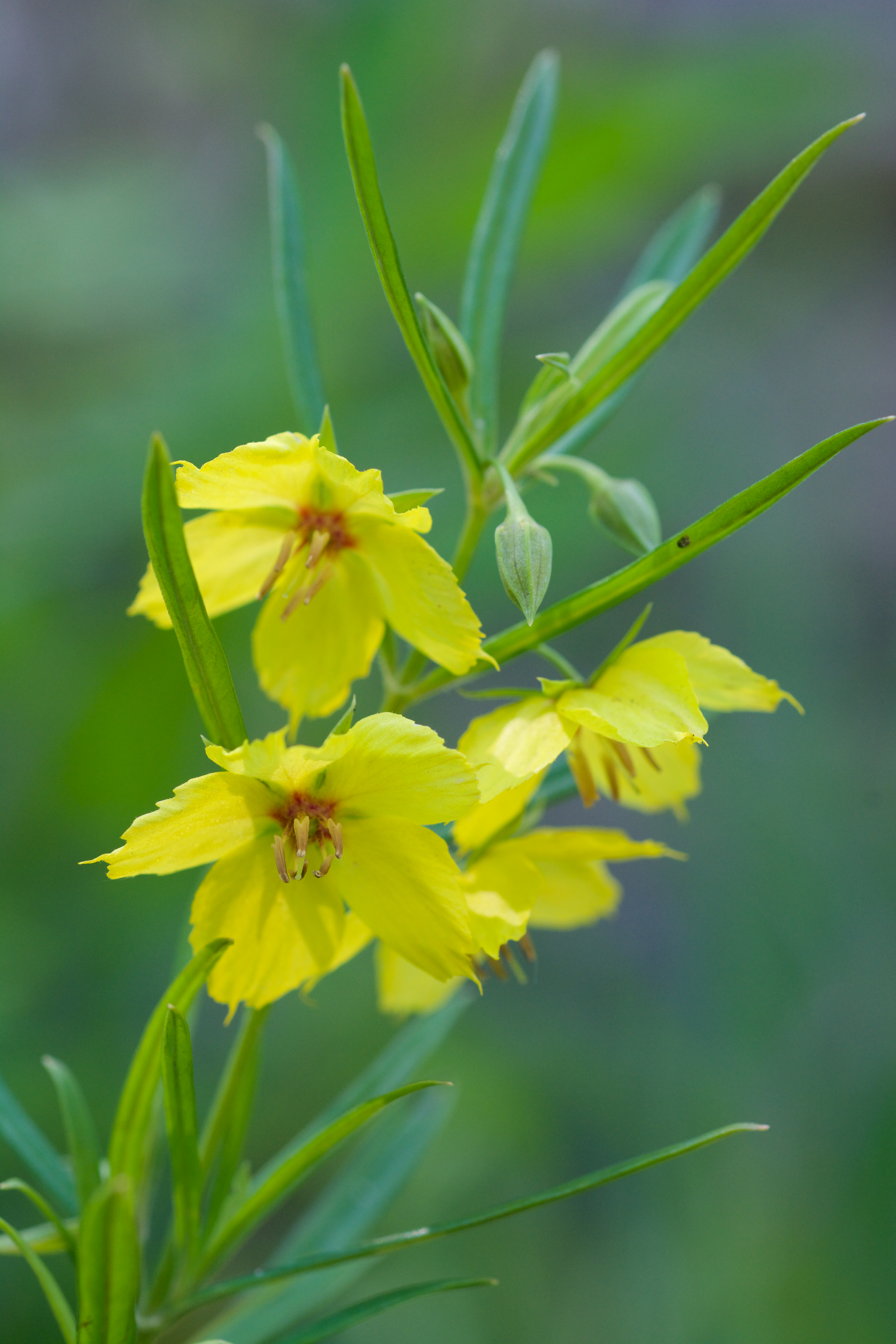

Conservation status
- Secure (NatureServe)

Scientific classification
- Kingdom: Plantae
- Clade: Tracheophytes
- Clade: Angiosperms
- Clade: Eudicots
- Clade: Asterids
- Order: Ericales
- Family: Primulaceae
- Genus: Lysimachia
- Species: L. quadriflora

Binomial name
- Lysimachia quadriflora Sims

= Lysimachia quadriflora =

Species of flowering plant

Lysimachia quadriflora, the fourflower yellow loosestrife, is a species of herbaceous plant in the family Primulaceae. It native to the eastern United States and Canada.

== Description ==
Lysimachia quadriflora is an erect branched forb growing to a maximum height of about 2 feet (0.61 m). It grows in moist to wet conditions in calcareous soils. The leaves are linear, firm, with mostly smooth edges. The flowers grow from an inflorescence cluster at the ends of the stems and branches. The five-parted flower is yellow with a reddish center and blooms from July to August. Its habitats include wet meadows, prairies, fields, swamps, and marshes.
