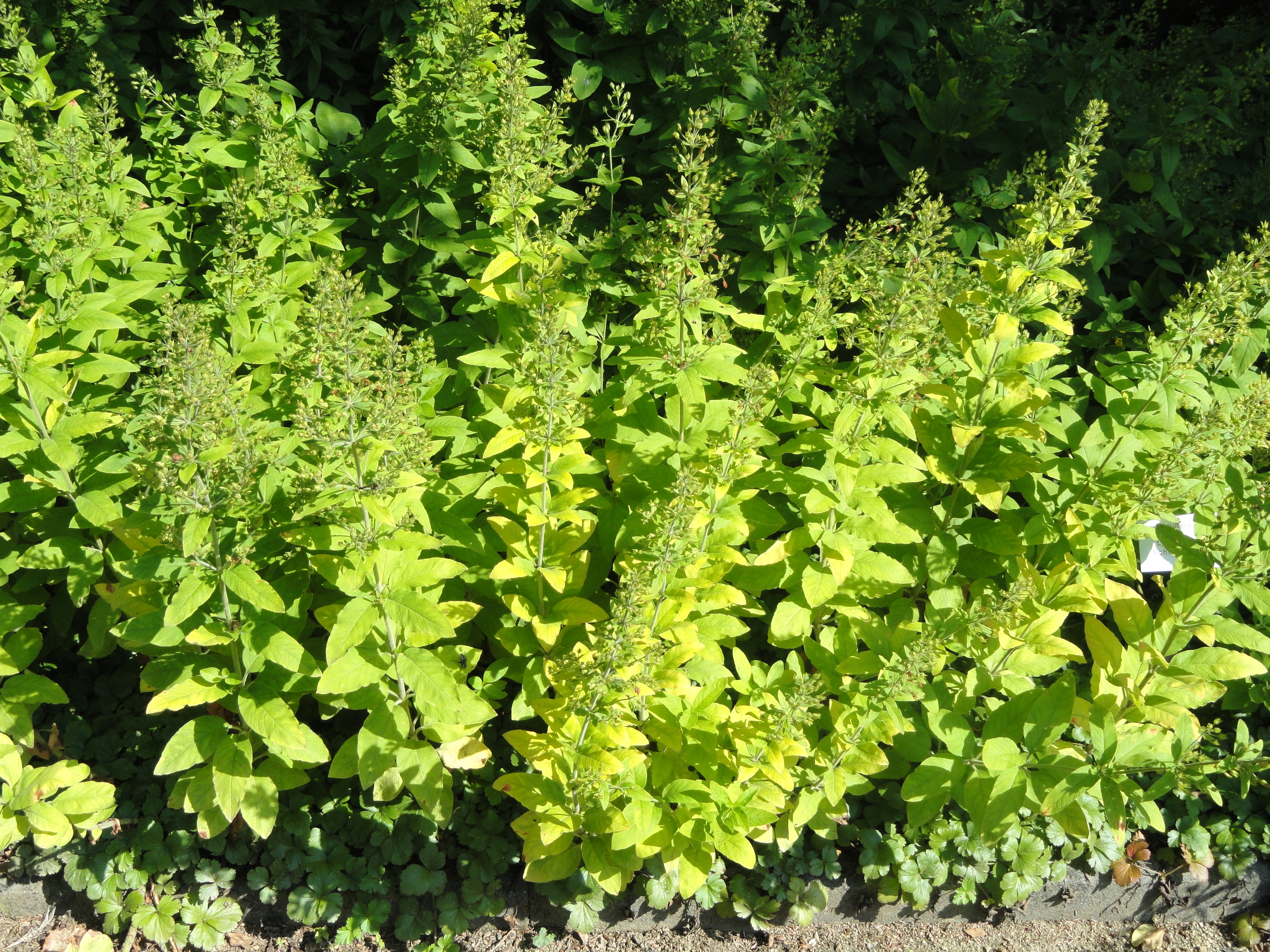

Scientific classification
- Kingdom: Plantae
- Clade: Tracheophytes
- Clade: Angiosperms
- Clade: Eudicots
- Clade: Asterids
- Order: Ericales
- Family: Primulaceae
- Genus: Lysimachia
- Species: L. lichiangensis

Binomial name
- Lysimachia lichiangensis Forrest

= Lysimachia lichiangensis =

Species of flowering plant

Lysimachia lichiangensis is a perennial herb, 35–75 cm in height, native to western Sichuan and north Yunnan, China.
