= Lysimachia × producta =

Scientific classification
- Kingdom: Plantae
- Clade: Tracheophytes
- Clade: Angiosperms
- Clade: Eudicots
- Clade: Asterids
- Order: Ericales
- Family: Primulaceae
- Genus: Lysimachia
- Species: L. × producta

Binomial name
- Lysimachia × producta (A.Gray) Fernald

Synonyms
- List: Lysimachia × foliosa Small; Lysimachia × polyantha Fernald; Lysimachia stricta var. producta A.Gray

Hybrid of flowering plant

Lysimachia × producta is a hybrid of flowering plant in the primrose family Primulaceae. It is native to eastern North America, from Quebec south to North Carolina, as far west as Wisconsin. The hybrid specific epithet producta means "stretched out, extended", a reference to the shape of its inflorescence. Indeed, the hybrid is sometimes referred to as the elongated loosestrife.

== Description ==
Lysimachia × producta has erect stems 4 to 10 dm (16 to 39 in) long. The leaves are whorled or opposite, each 4 to 8 cm (1.6 to 3.1 in) long and 1.5 to 2.5 cm (0.6 to 1.0 in) wide, with smooth surfaces. The inflorescence is a (sometimes leafy) terminal raceme, 20 to 35 cm (8 to 14 in) long. The pedicels are 1.5 to 3 cm (0.6 to 1.2 in) long. The flowers are 5-merous with yellow petals, streaked with reddish or reddish-black markings. The filaments are shorter than the petals.

The parents of Lysimachia × producta are L. quadrifolia and L. terrestris. The flowers of the hybrid and its parents are very similar but overall L. × producta more closely resembles L. terrestris since both have terminal racemes. The two may be distinguished by the length of the raceme, the length of the pedicels, and whorled (as opposed to opposite) leaves.

	L. quadrifolia	Lysimachia × producta	L. terrestris
Leaves	Whorled, (3-)4(-7) leaves per whorl, each 3 to 12 cm (1.2 to 4.7 in) long and 0.8 to 3.5 cm (0.3 to 1.4 in) wide, rarely to 4.5 cm (1.8 in) wide	Whorled or opposite, each 4 to 8 cm (1.6 to 3.1 in) long and 1.5 to 2.5 cm (0.6 to 1.0 in) wide	Usually opposite or subopposite (rarely alternate), each 3 to 10 cm (1.2 to 3.9 in) long and 0.5 to 2 cm (0.2 to 0.8 in) wide
Inflorescence	Solitary flowers in leaf axils	Terminal raceme, 20 to 35 cm (8 to 14 in) long	Terminal raceme, 10 to 30 cm (4 to 12 in) long
Pedicels	From 1.5 to 3 cm (0.6 to 1.2 in) long	From 1.5 to 3 cm (0.6 to 1.2 in) long	From 0.5 to 1.6 cm (0.2 to 0.6 in) long
Flowers	5-merous	5-merous	5-merous
Perianth	Petals yellow, with reddish base	Petals yellow, with reddish or reddish-black streaks	Petals yellow, with dark streaks
Stamens	Filaments fused, approximately 1.7 mm (0.07 in) long, shorter than the petals	Filaments fused, from 1.7 to 3 mm (0.07 to 0.12 in) long, shorter than the petals	Filaments fused, from 1 to 3.5 mm (0.04 to 0.14 in) long, shorter than the petals
