= Lysimachia hybrida =

Scientific classification
- Kingdom: Plantae
- Clade: Tracheophytes
- Clade: Angiosperms
- Clade: Eudicots
- Clade: Asterids
- Order: Ericales
- Family: Primulaceae
- Genus: Lysimachia
- Species: L. hybrida

Binomial name
- Lysimachia hybrida Michx.

Synonyms
- Lysimachia ciliata var. hybrida (Michx.) Chapm.; Lysimachia lanceolata subsp. hybrida (Michx.) J.D. Ray; Lysimachia lanceolata var. hybrida (Michx.) A. Gray; Nummularia hybrida (Michx.) Farw.; Steironema hybridum (Michx.) Raf. ex Small; Steironema lanceolatum var. hybridum (Michx.) A. Gray

Species of flowering plant

Lysimachia hybrida, common name Mississippi loosestrife or lowland yellow loosestrife, is a plant species widespread in much of the United States and Canada, absent only from the deserts in the west and the Arctic and sub-Arctic regions of the far north. It prefers moist locales such as marshes, swamps, wet meadows, stream banks, etc.

Lysimachia hybrida is a perennial herb up to 100 cm (40 inches) tall, spreading by means of underground rhizomes. Leaves are narrowly lanceolate or linear, up to 18 cm (7.2 inches) long. Flowers are yellow, borne mostly in the axils of the leaves.
