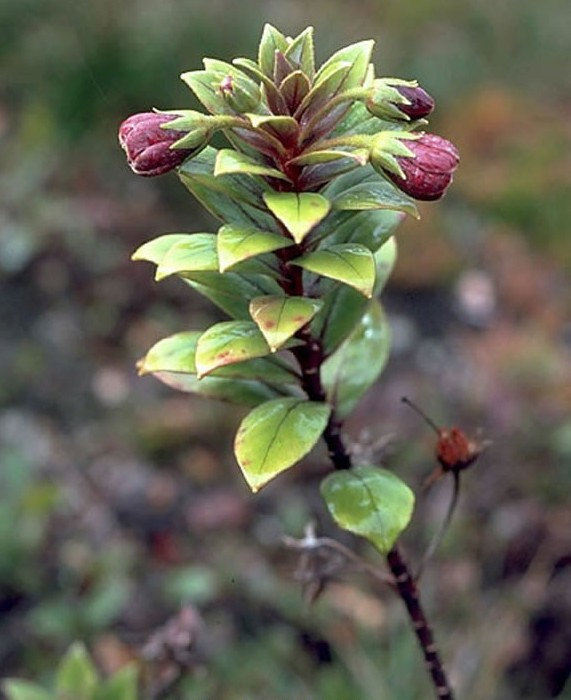

Conservation status
- Critically Imperiled (NatureServe)

Scientific classification
- Kingdom: Plantae
- Clade: Tracheophytes
- Clade: Angiosperms
- Clade: Eudicots
- Clade: Asterids
- Order: Ericales
- Family: Primulaceae
- Genus: Lysimachia
- Species: L. daphnoides

Binomial name
- Lysimachia daphnoides (A.Gray) Hillebr.

= Lysimachia daphnoides =

Species of flowering plant

Lysimachia daphnoides is a rare species of flowering plant in the Primulaceae known by several common names, including Pacific loosestrife, lehua makanoe, kolekole lehua, and kolokolo kuahiwi. It is endemic to Hawaii, where there are only three populations remaining on the island of Kauai. It was federally listed as an endangered species of the United States in 2010.

This is a small shrub growing up to about half a meter in maximum height with a dense covering of leathery leaves. Dark red or purple flowers occur in the leaf axils. The plant is a member of the boggy wet mountain ecosystem in Alakai Wilderness Preserve and Na Pali Kona Forest Reserve on Kauai. There are three known populations for a total number of plants between 200 and 300.

The flowers of this plant were traditionally used in leis.
