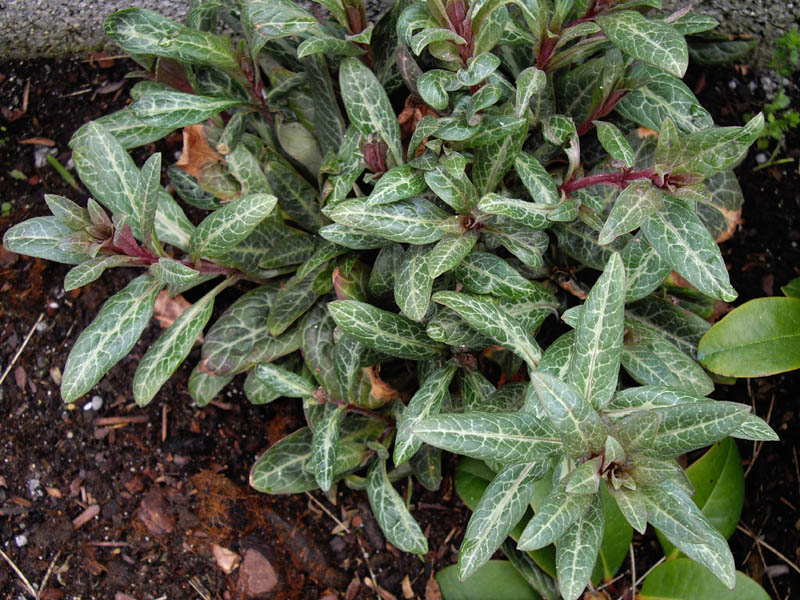

Conservation status
- Extinct in the Wild (IUCN 3.1)

Scientific classification
- Kingdom: Plantae
- Clade: Tracheophytes
- Clade: Angiosperms
- Clade: Eudicots
- Clade: Asterids
- Order: Ericales
- Family: Primulaceae
- Genus: Lysimachia
- Species: L. minoricensis

Binomial name
- Lysimachia minoricensis J.J.Rodr.
- It was endemic to Menorca, Balearic Islands

= Lysimachia minoricensis =

Species of flowering plant

Lysimachia minoricensis is a species of plant in the family Primulaceae. It was endemic to the island of Menorca in Spain. Its natural habitat was Mediterranean-type shrubby vegetation. It became extinct within its natural range and now only survives in cultivation.

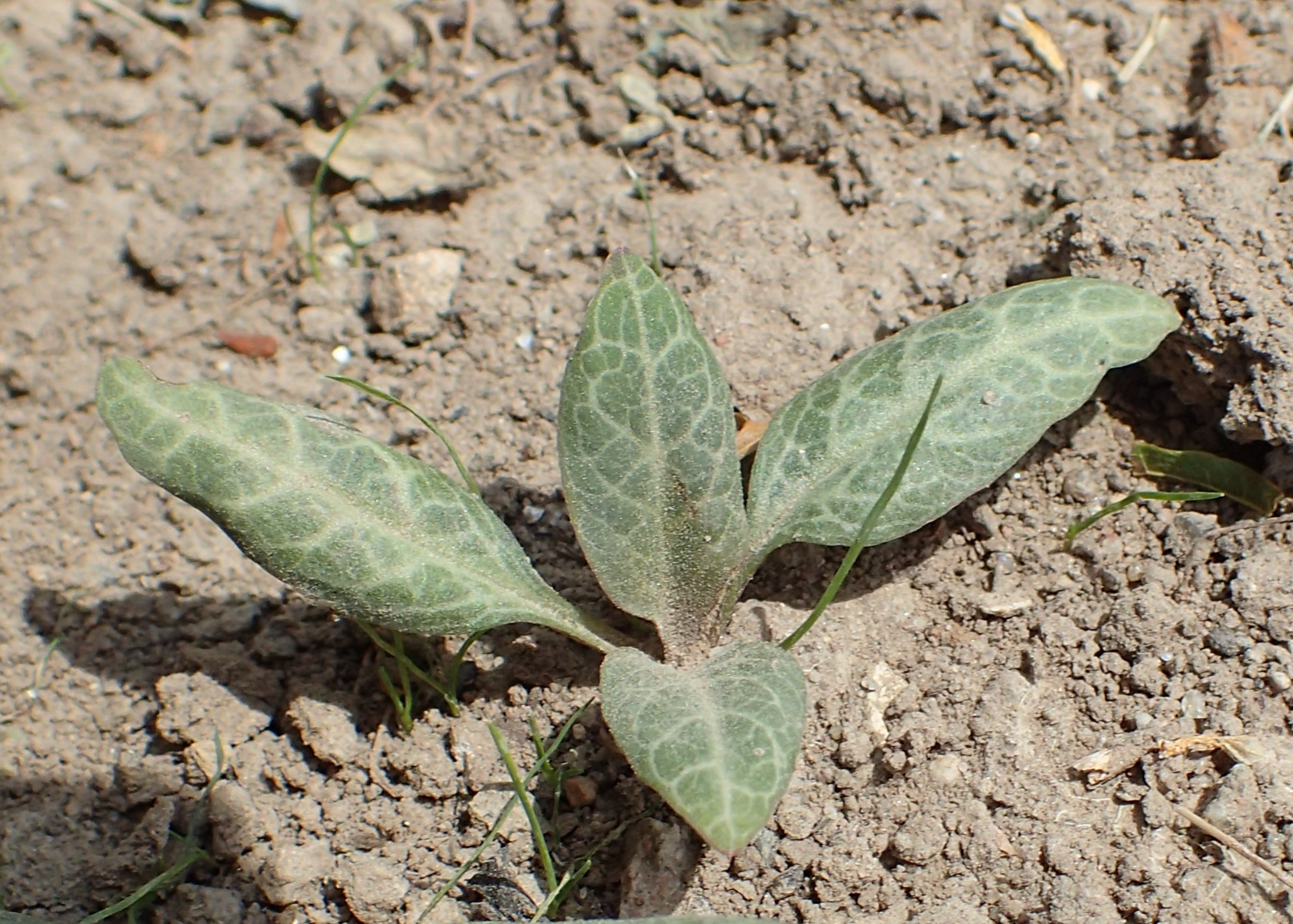
Lysimachia minoricensis growing in the UMCS Botanical Garden in Lublin

== Taxonomy ==
It was described by Juan Joaquín Rodríguez y Femenías in 1878.

== Conservation ==
Lysimachia minoricensis is Extinct in the Wild. It is cultivated in numerous ex-situ living collections in botanical gardens, and private collections.
