= Lysimachia venosa =

Conservation status
- Critically Imperiled (NatureServe)

- Critically Endangered (IUCN 3.1)

Scientific classification
- Kingdom: Plantae
- Clade: Tracheophytes
- Clade: Angiosperms
- Clade: Eudicots
- Clade: Asterids
- Order: Ericales
- Family: Primulaceae
- Genus: Lysimachia
- Species: L. venosa

Binomial name
- Lysimachia venosa (Wawra) H.St.John

Synonyms
- Lysimachia hillebrandii var. venosa Wawra; Lysimachiopsis venosa (Wawra) O. Deg. & I. Deg.

Species of flowering plant

Lysimachia venosa is a rare species of flowering plant in the family Primulaceae known by the common name veined yellow loosestrife. It is endemic to Hawaii, where it is known only from the island of Kauai. The plant was only collected twice, last in 1911, but in 1991, a branch was discovered that had broken off the steep cliffs above the headwaters of the Wailua River. The branch was from a plant of this species and may have fallen from the summit of Mount Waialeale. No more specimens have been found since and the plant may be extinct, but some experts believe it may still exist in unsurveyed parts of the habitat. It was federally listed as an endangered species of the United States in 2010.

This shrub grows at least 0.5 to 1.0 m in height. The oval leaves are up to 10 cm long by 4.8 cm wide. The flowers have dark red petals between 1 and 2 cm long.
