= Lysimachia foenum-graecum =

Scientific classification
- Kingdom: Plantae
- Clade: Embryophytes
- Clade: Tracheophytes
- Clade: Spermatophytes
- Clade: Angiosperms
- Clade: Eudicots
- Clade: Asterids
- Order: Ericales
- Family: Primulaceae
- Genus: Lysimachia
- Species: L. foenum-graecum

Binomial name
- Lysimachia foenum-graecum Hance

Species of flowering plant

Lysimachia foenum-graecum is a species of flowering plant in the family Primulaceae. It is widely distributed in India and southern China, including from southeastern Yunnan through Guangxi to southwestern Hunan and northern Guangdong.

In Chinese, its most widespread common name is simplified Chinese: 灵香草; traditional Chinese: 靈香草; pinyin: língxiāngcǎo; Jyutping: ling4 hoeng1 cou2. Its leaves are used in traditional Chinese medicine for headache, toothache, sore throat, chest and abdominal distension and ascariasis.
