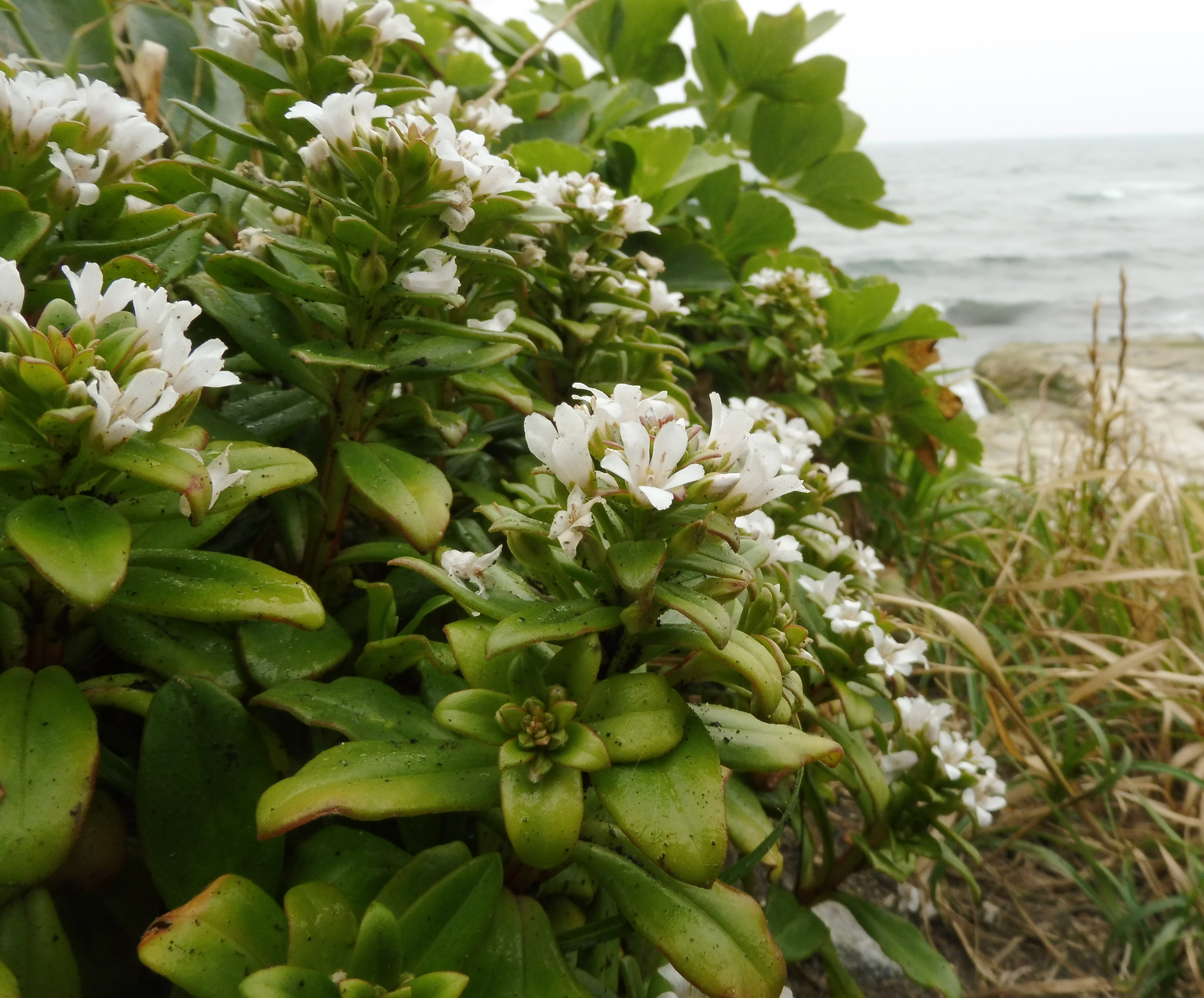

Scientific classification
- Kingdom: Plantae
- Clade: Tracheophytes
- Clade: Angiosperms
- Clade: Eudicots
- Clade: Asterids
- Order: Ericales
- Family: Primulaceae
- Genus: Lysimachia
- Species: L. mauritiana

Binomial name
- Lysimachia mauritiana Lam.

= Lysimachia mauritiana =

Species of flowering plant

Lysimachia mauritiana is a species of flowering plant in the primrose family Primulaceae. It is native to eastern Asia, where it is widespread in coastal areas, including China, Japan, Korea, Taiwan, the Philippines, and various islands in the Indian and Pacific Ocean. It is considered to be a common species in Japan. Its natural habitat is along beaches and maritime rock crevices.

It is a biennial, growing to 50 cm tall. It has fleshy spathulate to obovate leaves. It produces white terminal racemes of flowers in late spring and early summer.
