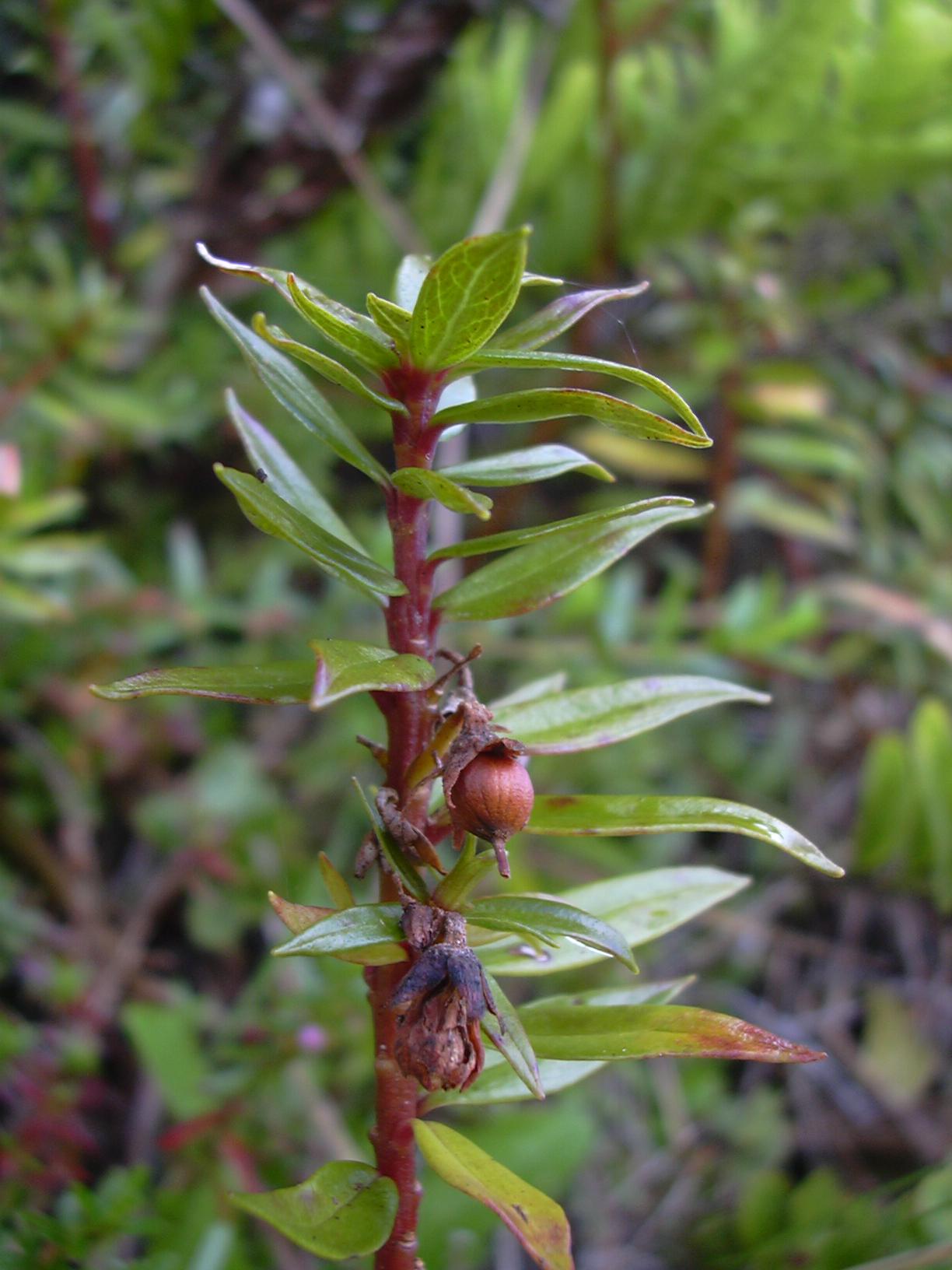

Scientific classification
- Kingdom: Plantae
- Clade: Tracheophytes
- Clade: Angiosperms
- Clade: Eudicots
- Clade: Asterids
- Order: Ericales
- Family: Primulaceae
- Genus: Lysimachia
- Species: L. remyi

Binomial name
- Lysimachia remyi Hillebr. (1888)

Subspecies
- Lysimachia remyi subsp. maxima (Masam.) I.C.Oh & Anderb.; Lysimachia remyi subsp. remyi

Synonyms
- Lysimachiopsis remyi (Hillebr.) A.Heller (1897)

= Lysimachia remyi =

Species of flowering plant

Lysimachia remyi is a species of flowering plant in the family Primulaceae. It is native to the islands of Molokaʻi and Maui in the Hawaiian Islands.

Two varieties are accepted:

- Lysimachia remyi subsp. maxima (Masam.) I.C.Oh & Anderb. – eastern Molokaʻi
- Lysimachia remyi subsp. remyi – Maui and Molokaʻi
