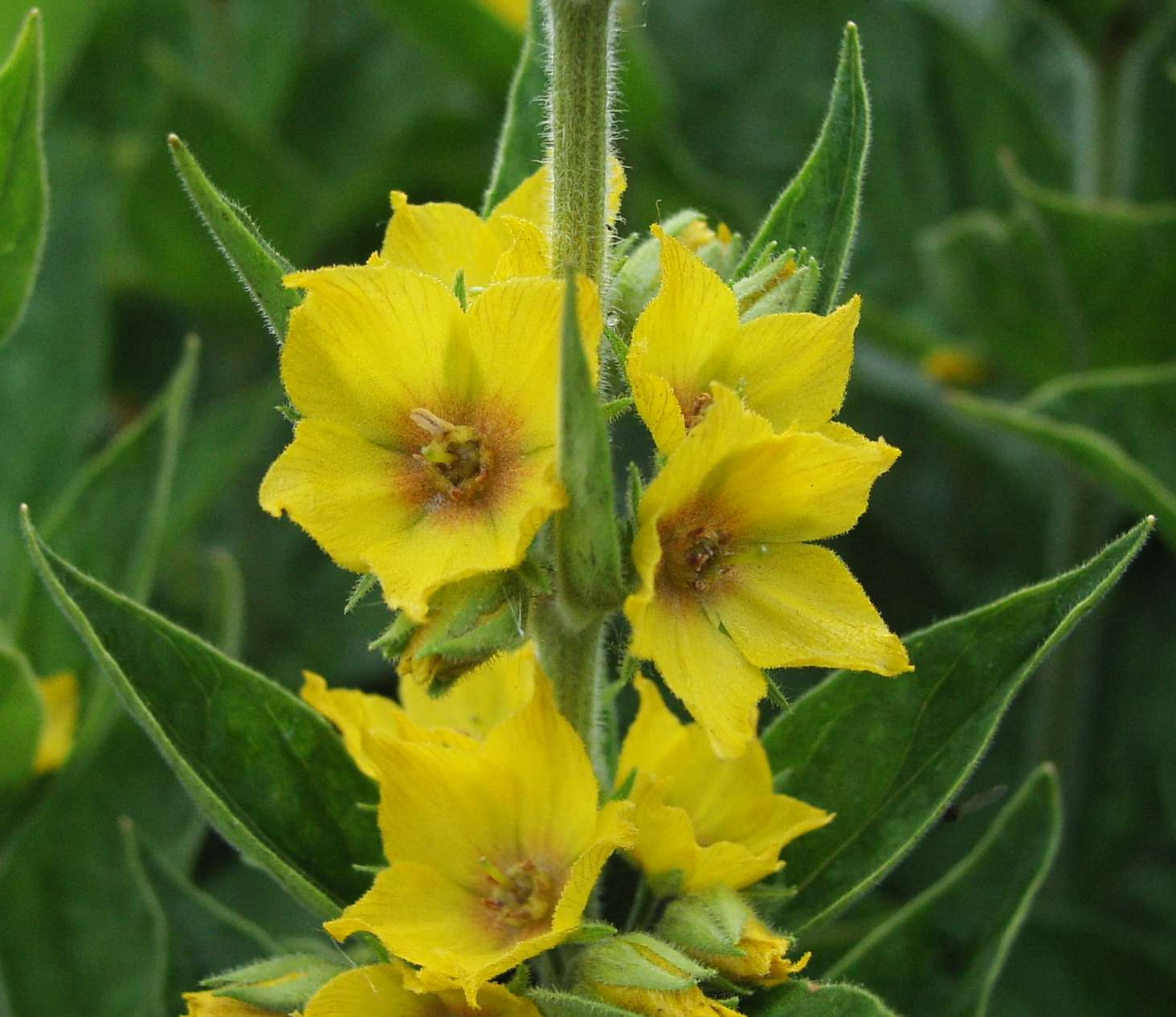

Conservation status
- Least Concern (IUCN 3.1)

Scientific classification
- Kingdom: Plantae
- Clade: Tracheophytes
- Clade: Angiosperms
- Clade: Eudicots
- Clade: Asterids
- Order: Ericales
- Family: Primulaceae
- Genus: Lysimachia
- Species: L. punctata

Binomial name
- Lysimachia punctata L.

= Lysimachia punctata =

Species of flowering plant in the primrose family

Lysimachia punctata, the dotted loosestrife, large yellow loosestrife, circle flower, or spotted loosestrife, is a flowering plant species in the family Primulaceae.

== Description ==
Lysimachia punctata is a rhizomatous perennial herbaceous plant growing up to about 1.2 m (3 ft 11 in) in height. The flowers have five petals, sepals and stamens and are produced in dense groups in the axils of leaves. The leaves are opposite and ovate. Both the leaves and the flower parts are hairy. The petals are fringed with hairs and the hairy sepals all-green, without the orange margin of L. vulgaris.

== Distribution ==
It is native to SE Europe east to the Caucasus, introduced as a garden plant and widely naturalized as a garden escape on rough ground, roadsides and damp places.
