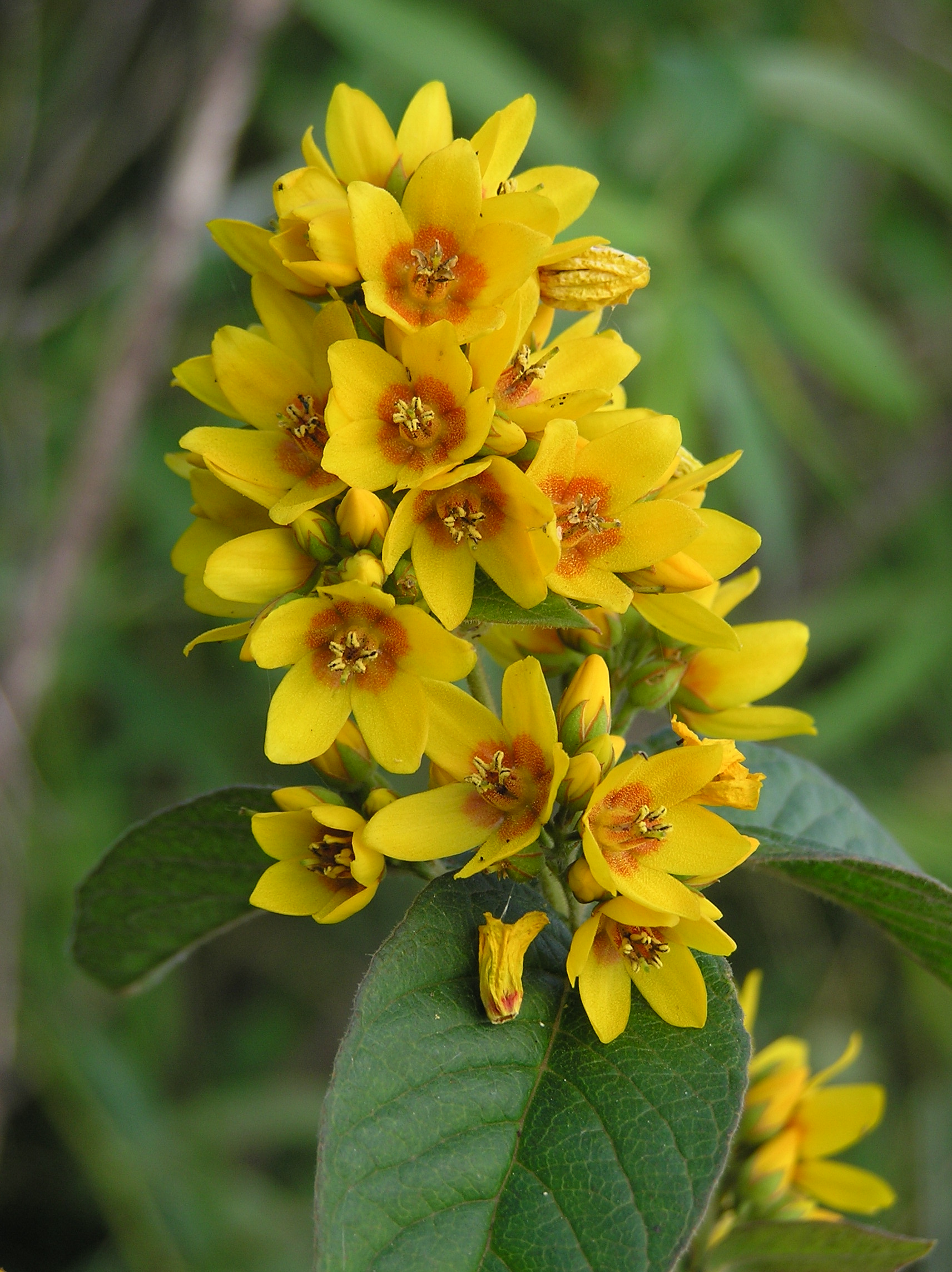

Conservation status
- Least Concern (IUCN 3.1)

Scientific classification
- Kingdom: Plantae
- Clade: Embryophytes
- Clade: Tracheophytes
- Clade: Spermatophytes
- Clade: Angiosperms
- Clade: Eudicots
- Clade: Asterids
- Order: Ericales
- Family: Primulaceae
- Genus: Lysimachia
- Species: L. vulgaris

Binomial name
- Lysimachia vulgaris L.

Synonyms
- Lysimachia vulgaris var. typica R.Knuth; Lysimachusa vulgaris (L.) Pohl

= Lysimachia vulgaris =

Species of flowering plant in the primrose family

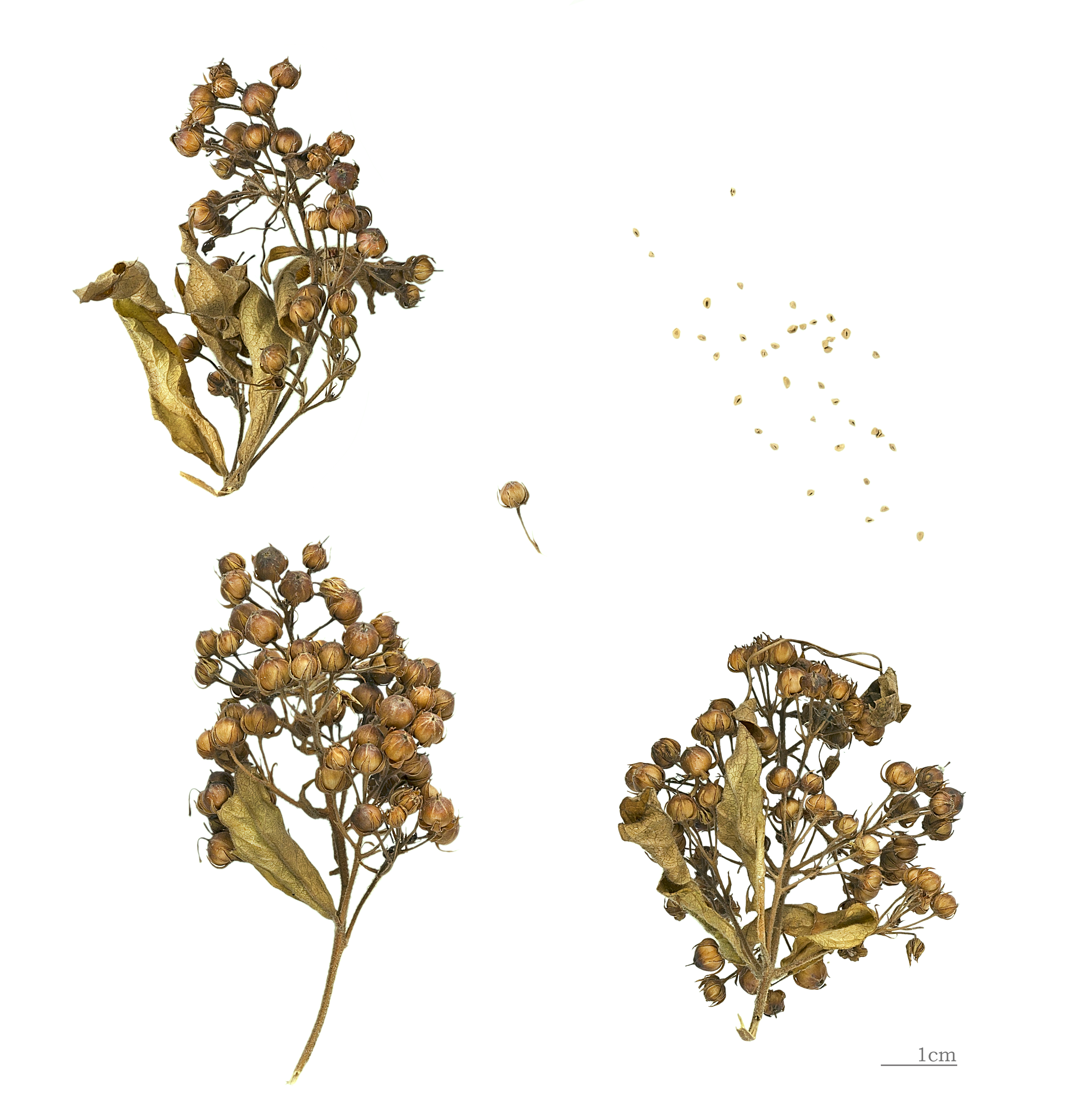
Lysimachia vulgaris capsules and seeds

Lysimachia vulgaris, the yellow loosestrife or garden loosestrife, is a species of herbaceous perennial flowering plant in the family Primulaceae. It was transferred to Myrsinoideae based on results of molecular phylogenetic research before being merged into the Primulaceae.

== Description ==
Yellow loosestrife is a tall downy semi-evergreen perennial plant with an upright habit, 50–150 cm (20–59 in) high, with erect panicles of conspicuous yellow flowers. The edges of the petals lack the fringe of hairs seen in L. punctata, and the hairy, narrow triangular sepals have a conspicuous orange margin. It flowers from June through August in the British Isles. Measuring 5–12 cm (2.0–4.7 in) long, the entire-margined leaves are opposite or 3–4-whorled, ovate to lanceolate and spotted with translucent orange glands.

The stem is round or square in cross-section, downy, and usually solid and pith-filled

== Etymology ==
The generic name Lysimachia means ‘ending strife’, derived from Lysimachus, a King of Thrace, Asia Minor and Macedon, also an army leader under Alexander the Great. The specific epithet vulgaris means common, or usual.

== Habitat, distribution and ecology ==
L. vulgaris is native to Eurasia, as far West as Ireland where it is frequent to locally common, and North Africa. It has been introduced to North America, where it is considered an exotic introduction, for its ornamental value in gardens. It grows best in moist habitats such as fens and wet woodlands as well as on lakesides and riverbanks.

Like many of its congeners, L. vulgaris provides an important nectar source for specialist solitary bees in the genus Macropis, especially Macropis europaea. However, the relationship between Lysimachia and Macropis is not thought to be obligate on the part of the plant.

For the first time, a plant pathogen Ramularia lysimachiae was found on the plant in County Durham in 2004.

L. vulgaris has been listed as a noxious weed in Washington State and Oregon on account of its invasiveness. Although the seeds only appear to have a maximum viability of 3 years when stored in the soil, the plant can spread by vegetative means from rhizomes over extensive areas, sometimes to the detriment of other species. It remains in a vegetative state for some years before blooming, so that flowering stands of the plant indicate that it has long been present in that area.

L. vulgaris is an unpalatable species that is avoided by large herbivores due to its content of toxic compounds.

== In use ==
Like many other plants in the genus Lysimachia, yellow loosestrife has historically been valued for its medicinal properties and is still sometimes used today in traditional folk medicine by some eastern cultures. It has been used as an effective anti-inflammatory agent as well as for treating fever, wounds, ulcers, and diarrhoea. It also has analgesic, astringent, and expectorant properties.
