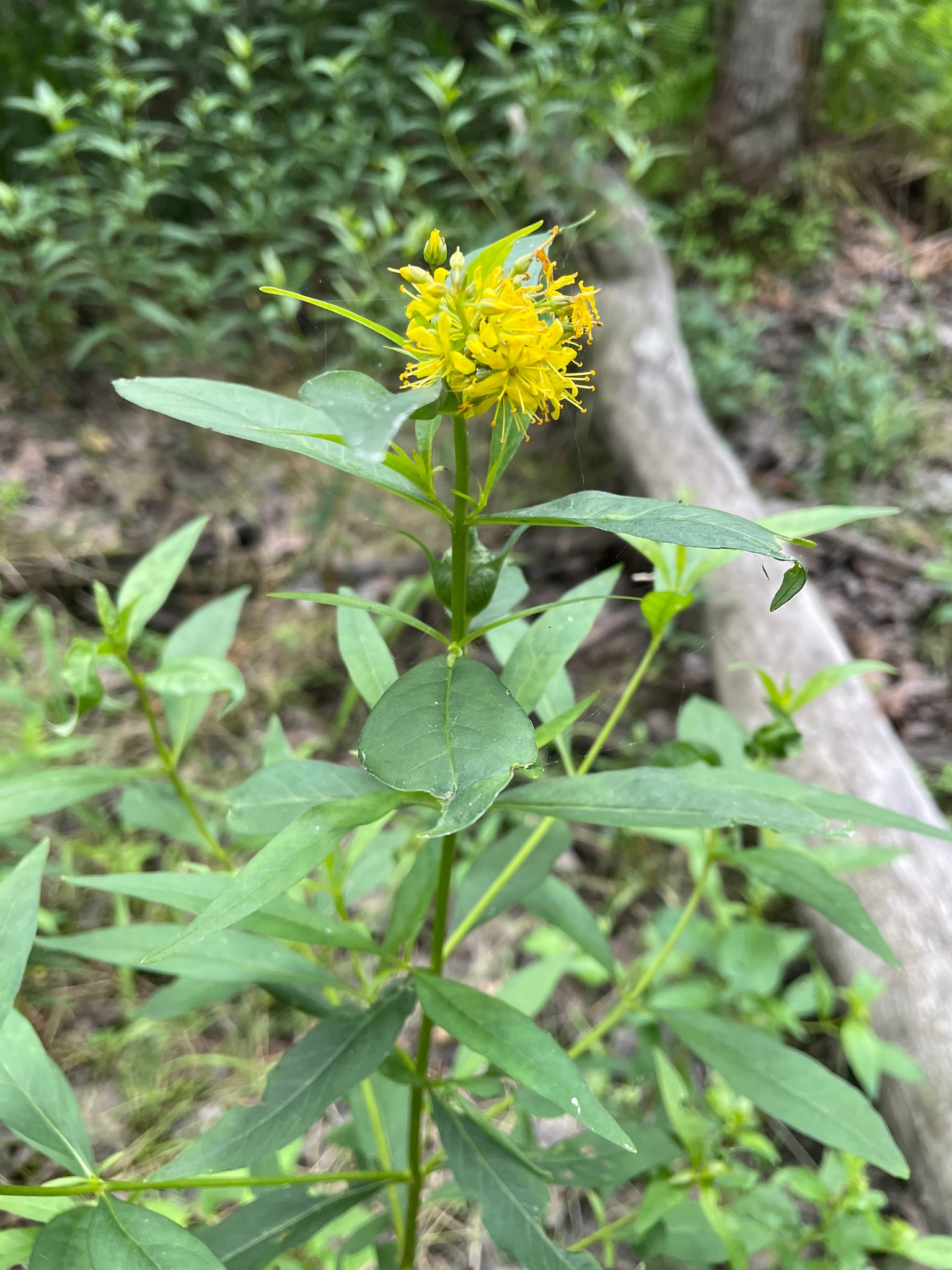

Scientific classification
- Kingdom: Plantae
- Clade: Tracheophytes
- Clade: Angiosperms
- Clade: Eudicots
- Clade: Asterids
- Order: Ericales
- Family: Primulaceae
- Genus: Lysimachia
- Species: L. × commixta

Binomial name
- Lysimachia × commixta Fernald

= Lysimachia × commixta =

Hybrid of flowering plant

Lysimachia × commixta is a hybrid of flowering plant in the primrose family Primulaceae. It is native to eastern North America, from eastern Canada across the Great Lakes region west to Minnesota. The hybrid specific epithet commixta means "mixed together, mixed up", which presumably refers to the genetic mixing of two species. Indeed, the hybrid is sometimes referred to as the mixed loosestrife or the commingling loosestrife.

== Description ==
The parents of Lysimachia × commixta are L. terrestris and L. thyrsiflora. The hybrid has a terminal raceme subtended by similar lateral racemes. Vigorous individuals have additional axillary racemes up to 6 cm (2.4 in) long. Although it shows a floral morphology approaching L. thyrsiflora, the hybrid is often confused with L. terrestris, which also has a terminal raceme. The length of the terminal raceme, the length of its pedicel, and the length of the filaments may be used to distinguish L. terrestris from L. × commixta.

	L. terrestris	Lysimachia × commixta	L. thyrsiflora
Leaves	Opposite or subopposite (rarely alternate); 3 to 10 cm (1.2 to 3.9 in) long and 0.5 to 2 cm (0.2 to 0.8 in) wide	Alternate or subopposite; 5 to 12 cm (2.0 to 4.7 in) long and 1.3 to 4 cm (0.5 to 1.6 in) wide	Opposite to subopposite or whorled; 5 to 16 cm (2.0 to 6.3 in) long and 0.5 to 6 cm (0.2 to 2.4 in) wide
Inflorescence	Terminal raceme, 10 to 30 cm (3.9 to 11.8 in) long	Terminal raceme and (usually) one or more axillary racemes, up to 6 cm (2.4 in) long	Axillary racemes, 1 to 3 cm (0.4 to 1.2 in) long
Pedicels	From 5 to 16 mm (0.2 to 0.6 in) long	From 3 to 6 mm (0.1 to 0.2 in) long	From 1 to 4 mm (0.0 to 0.2 in) long
Flowers	5-merous	(4-)5(-9)-merous	5-7(-9)-merous
Perianth	Petals yellow, with dark streaks	Petals cream-yellow, with dark streaks	Petals cream-yellow, dark streaked or dotted
Stamens	Filaments fused, 1 to 3.5 mm (0.0 to 0.1 in) long, shorter than the petals	Filaments distinct, 3.5 to 7 mm (0.1 to 0.3 in) long, as long as or slightly longer than the petals	Filaments distinct, 4 to 5 mm (0.2 to 0.2 in) long, nearly twice as long as the petals

== Taxonomy ==
Lysimachia × commixta was first collected (as L. terrestris) by H. Eggert in 1878 in St. Clair County, Illinois. It was described by Merritt Lyndon Fernald in 1950 based on an earlier report by Fernald and Karl McKay Wiegand published in 1910. However, Fernald did not provide a Latin description of the hybrid and so technically the name is invalid.

Specimens of Lysimachia × commixta Fernald
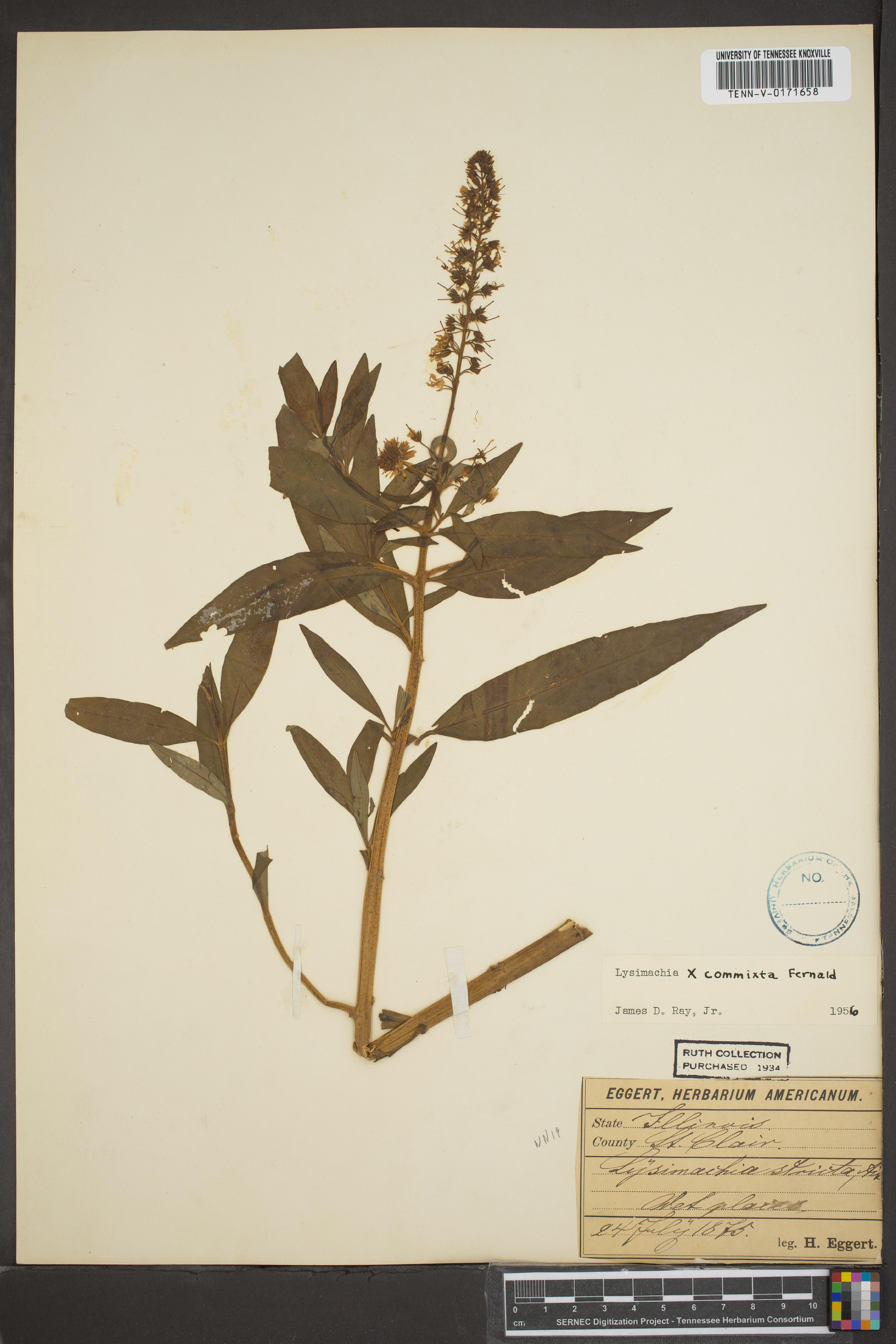
Specimen collected by Eggert in Illinois in 1875

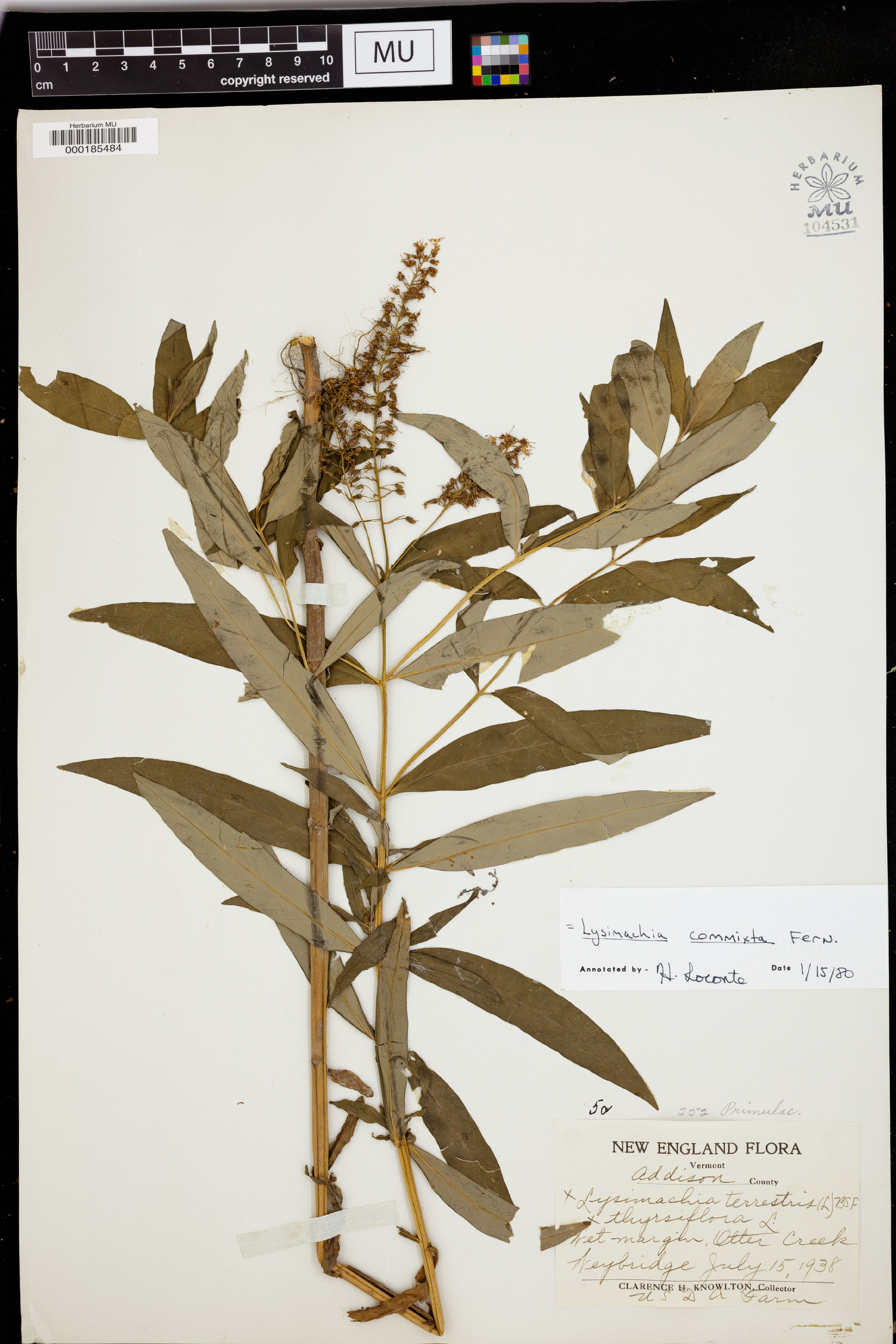
Specimen collected by Knowlton in Vermont in 1938

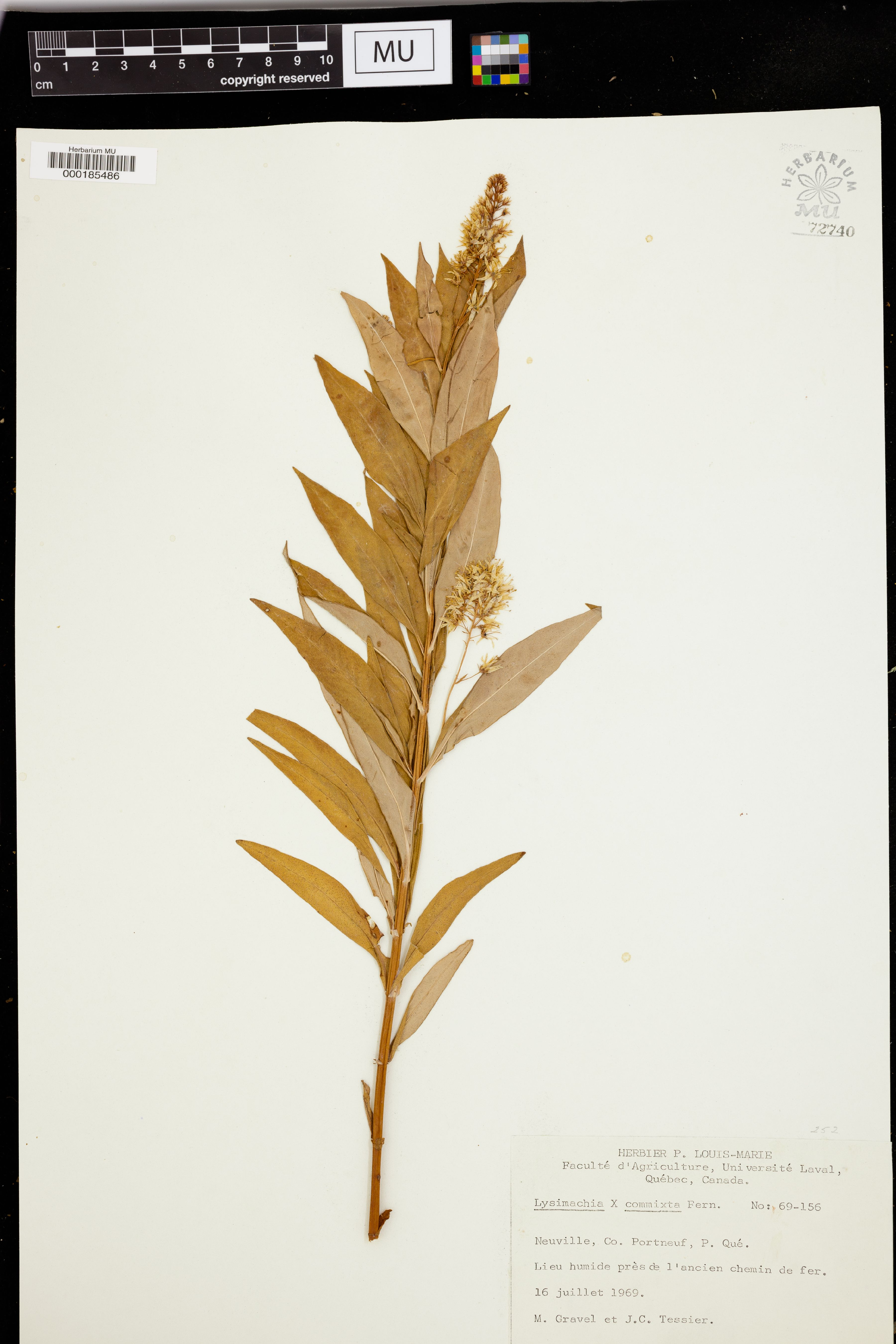
Specimen collected by Gravel and Tessier in Quebec in 1969

== Distribution ==
The distribution of Lysimachia × commixta coincides with that of its parents. The hybrid ranges from eastern Canada, across New England, New York, and the Great Lakes region, extending as far west as Minnesota.

Lysimachia × commixta is local in distribution. The parents may or may not be found in the vicinity of hybrid populations. For example, the populations in St. Clair County, Illinois, discovered by Eggert in 1878, appear to be extra-parental in range. The hybrid's expansion into southern Illinois is thought to be a result of vegetative propagation along the Mississippi River lowlands.
