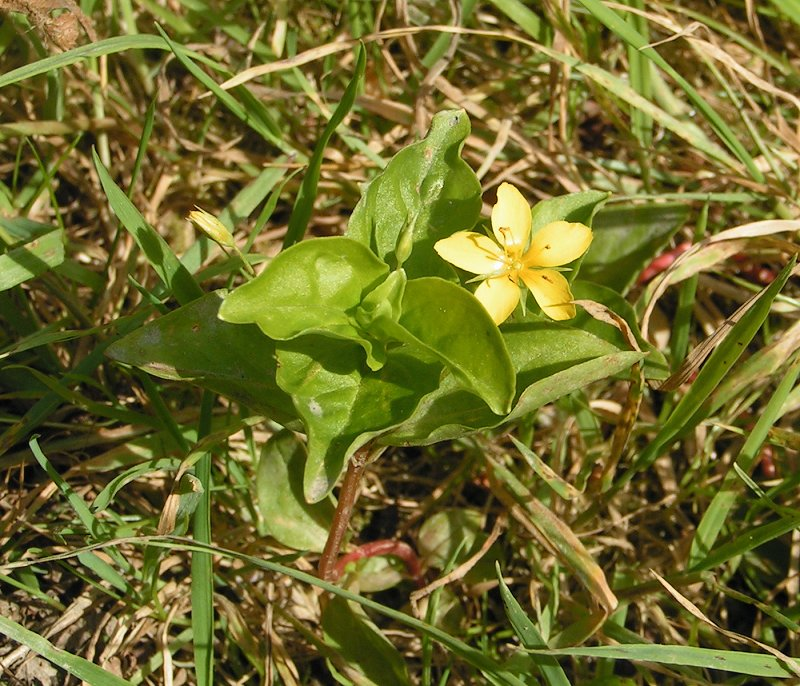
- Yellow pimpernel, Lysimachia nemorum

Scientific classification
- Kingdom: Plantae
- Clade: Embryophytes
- Clade: Tracheophytes
- Clade: Spermatophytes
- Clade: Angiosperms
- Clade: Eudicots
- Clade: Asterids
- Order: Ericales
- Family: Primulaceae
- Subfamily: Myrsinoideae
- Genus: Lysimachia; Tourn. ex L. (1753)

Species
- 282; see text

Synonyms
- Synonymy: Alsinanthemum Fabr. (1759); Anagallidastrum P.Micheli ex Adans. (1763); Anagallis L. (1753); Anagzanthe Baudo (1843), nom. nud.; Apochoris Duby (1844); Asterolinon Hoffmanns. & Link (1820); Bernardina Baudo (1843); Borissa Raf. ex Steud. (1840), not validly publ.; Centunculus L. (1753); Cerium Lour. (1790); Coxia Endl. (1839); Dugezia Montrouz. (1860); Ephemerum Rchb. (1831); Euparea Banks & Sol. ex Gaertn. (1788); Glaux Tourn. ex L. (1753); Godinella T.Lestib. (1827); Jirasekia F.W.Schmidt (1793); Lerouxia Mérat (1812); Lubinia Comm. ex Vent. (1803); Lysima Medik. (1791); Lysimachiopsis A.Heller (1897); Lysimachusa Pohl (1809); Lysimandra (Endl.) Rchb. (1841); Lysis Kuntze (1891); Manoelia Bowdich (1825); Micropyxis Duby (1844); Naumburgia Moench (1802); Nemorella Ehrh. (1789); Nummularia Hill (1756); Numularia Gilib. (1782), not validly publ.; Orescia Reinw. (1825); Palladia Moench (1794), nom. illeg.; Pelletiera A.St.-Hil. (1822); Steironema Raf. (1820); Theopyxis Griseb. (1856); Thyrsanthus Schrank (1813 publ. 1814); Tridynia Raf. ex Steud. (1841), not validly publ.; Trientalis Ruppius ex L. (1753); Vroedea Bubani (1897)

= Lysimachia =

Genus of flowering plants

Lysimachia (/ˌlaɪsɪˈmeɪkiə/ LY-sim-AY-kee-ə) is a genus consisting of 182 accepted species of flowering plants traditionally classified in the family Primulaceae. Based on a molecular phylogenetic study it was transferred to the family Myrsinaceae, before this family was later merged into the Primulaceae.

== Characteristics ==
Lysimachia species often have yellow flowers, and grow vigorously. They tend to grow in damp conditions. Several species within Lysimachia are commonly called loosestrife, although this name is also used for plants within the genus Lythrum. The genus is named in honor of Lysimachus, who is said to have calmed a mad ox by feeding it a member of the genus.

Lysimachia species are used as food plants by the larvae of some butterflies and moths, including the dot moth, grey pug, lime-speck pug, small angle shades, and v-pug.

== Specialized pollinators ==
Bees of the genus Macropis are specialized to pollinate oil-producing Lysimachia plants. These bees use exclusively Lysimachia floral oils for building their nests and provisioning cells. Lysimachia floral-specific chemicals are strong attractors for Macropis nuda and Macropis fulvipes bees that are seldom found in other plant genera.

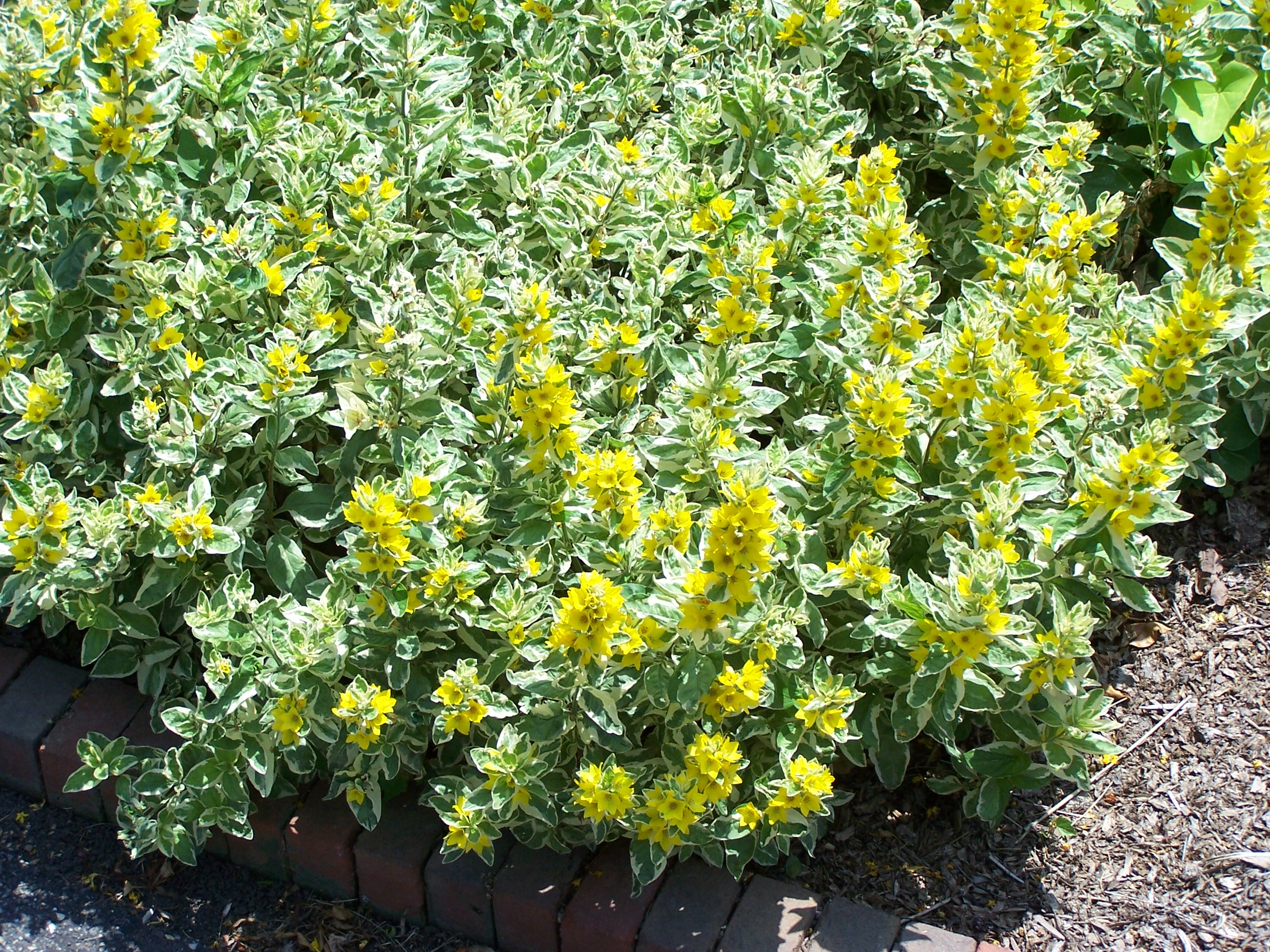
Spotted Loosestrife (Lysimachia punctata)

== Fossil record ==
Several fossil seeds of Lysimachia sp. have been described from middle Miocene strata of the Fasterholt area near Silkeborg in Central Jutland, Denmark. †Lysimachia nikitinii seed fossils have been collected from Pliocene strata of south eastern Belarus. The fossils are most similar to seeds of the East Asian Lysimachia davurica.

== Selected species ==
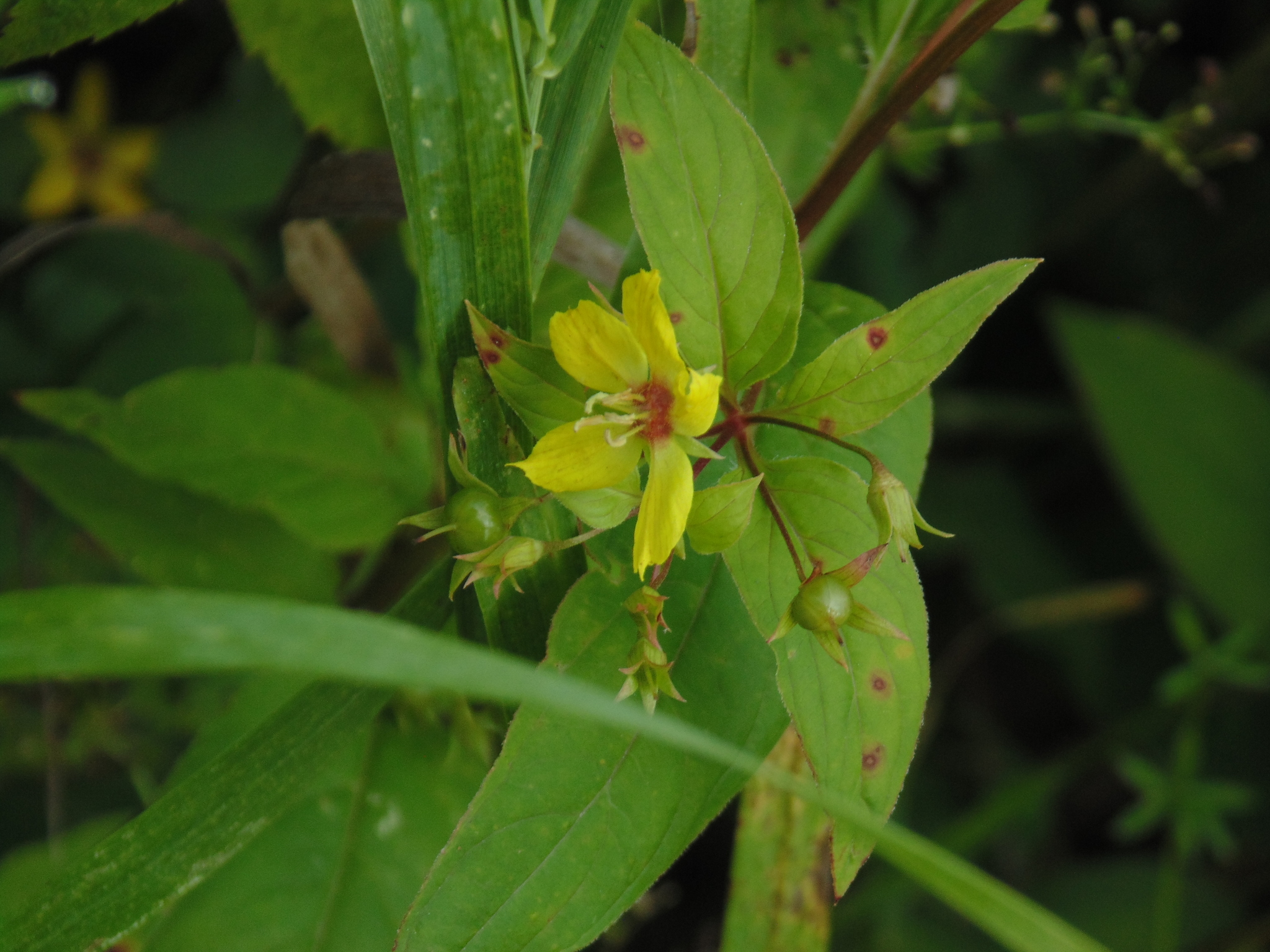
Fringed Loosestrife (Lysimachia ciliata)

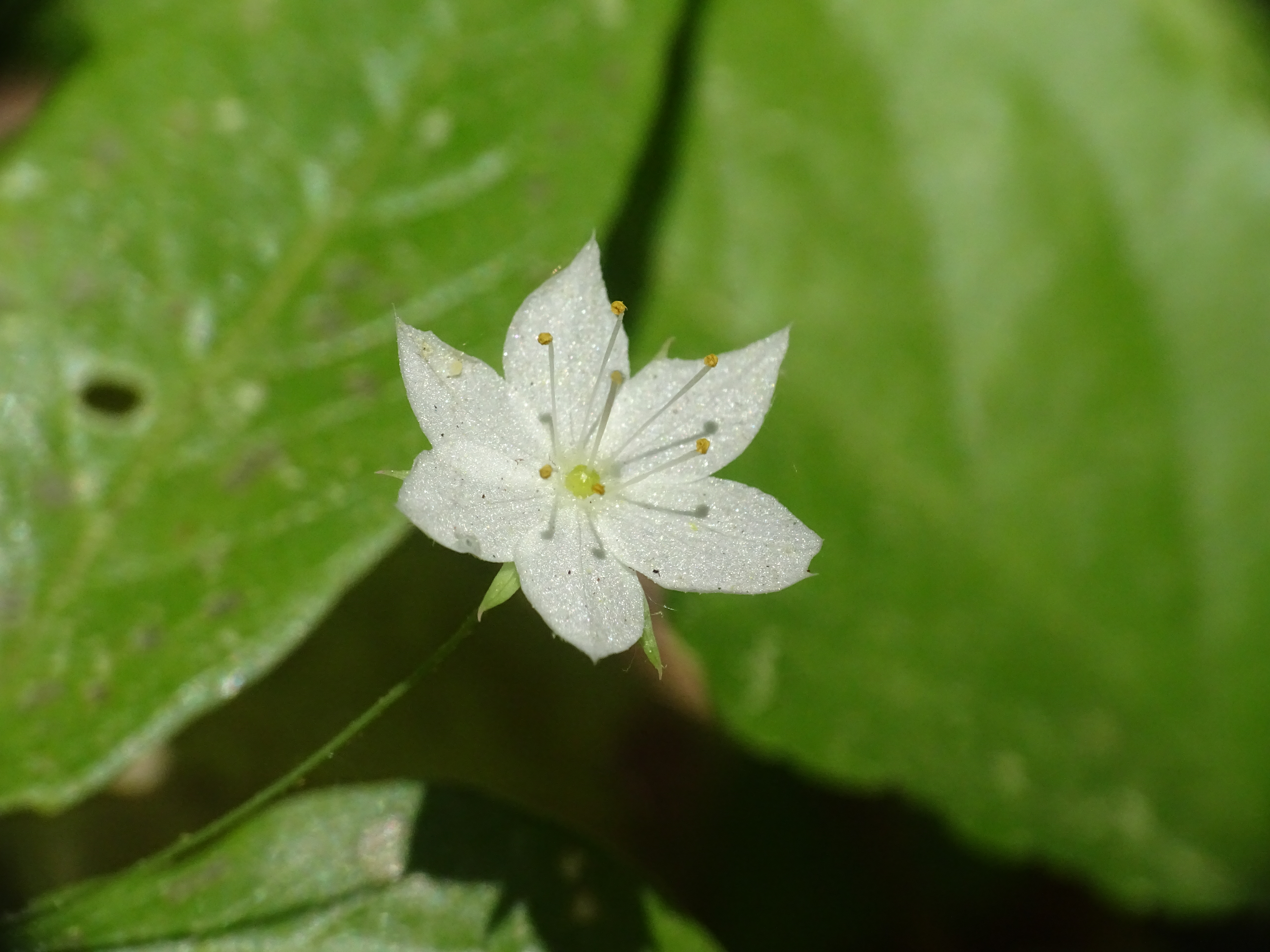
Starflower (Lysimachia borealis)

282 species are accepted. Selected species include:

- Lysimachia arvensis L. – Scarlet pimpernel
- Lysimachia asperulifolia Poir., orth. var. L. asperulaefolia – roughleaf yellow loosestrife (endemic to Atlantic coastal plain in North and South Carolina)
- Lysimachia atropurpurea L. – purple gooseneck loosestrife
- Lysimachia azorica Hornem. ex Hook. – (endemic to the Azores)
- Lysimachia barystachys Bunge – Manchurian yellow loosestrife
- Lysimachia ciliata L. – fringed loosestrife (North America)
- Lysimachia clethroides Duby – gooseneck loosestrife
- Lysimachia × commixta Fernald – a hybrid of L. terrestris and L. thyrsiflora
- Lysimachia congestiflora Hemsl.
- Lysimachia daphnoides (A.Gray) Hillebr. – Lehua makanoe (Island of Kauaʻi in Hawaii)
- Lysimachia filifolia C.N.Forbes (Islands of Oʻahu and Kauaʻi in Hawaii)
- Lysimachia foenum-graecum Hance
- Lysimachia fraseri Duby – Fraser's yellow loosestrife (Southeastern United States)
- Lysimachia glutinosa Rock
- Lysimachia hillebrandii Hook.f. ex A.Gray – kolokolo kuahiwi (Hawaii)
- Lysimachia hybrida Michx.
- Lysimachia iniki K.L.Marr – Wailua River yellow loosestrife (endemic to Kauaʻi, Hawaii)
- Lysimachia japonica Thunb.
- Lysimachia latifolia (Hook.) Cholewa – Pacific starflower
- Lysimachia lichiangensis Forrest
- Lysimachia lydgatei Hillebr. – Maui yellow loosestrife (endemic to Maui, Hawaii)
- Lysimachia maritima (L.) Galasso, Banfi & Soldano
- Lysimachia mauritiana Lam.
- Lysimachia minoricensis J.J.Rodr. (Spain)
- Lysimachia nemorum L. – yellow pimpernel
- Lysimachia nummularia L. – creeping jenny, moneywort (Europe, introduced in North America)
- Lysimachia pendens K.L.Marr
- Lysimachia × producta (A.Gray) Fernald – a hybrid of L. terrestris and L. quadrifolia
- Lysimachia punctata L. – spotted loosestrife
- Lysimachia quadriflora Sims – four-flower yellow loosestrife (Eastern North America)
- Lysimachia quadrifolia L. – whorled loosestrife (Eastern North America)
- Lysimachia remyi Hillebr. (islands of Maui and Molokaʻi in Hawaii)
  - Lysimachia remyi subsp. maxima (Masam.) I.C.Oh & Anderb. (Molokaʻi)
  - Lysimachia remyi subsp. remyi (Maui and Molokaʻi)
- Lysimachia scopulensis K.L.Marr
- Lysimachia sertulata Baudo – Chilean melilukul
- Lysimachia terrestris (L.) Britton, Sterns & Poggenb. – swamp candles (North America)
- Lysimachia thyrsiflora L. – tufted loosestrife
- Lysimachia venosa (Wawra) H.St.John – veined yellow loosestrife (endemic to Kauaʻi, Hawaii)
- Lysimachia verticillaris Biehler
- Lysimachia vulgaris L. – garden loosestrife, yellow loosestrife (Eurasia)
