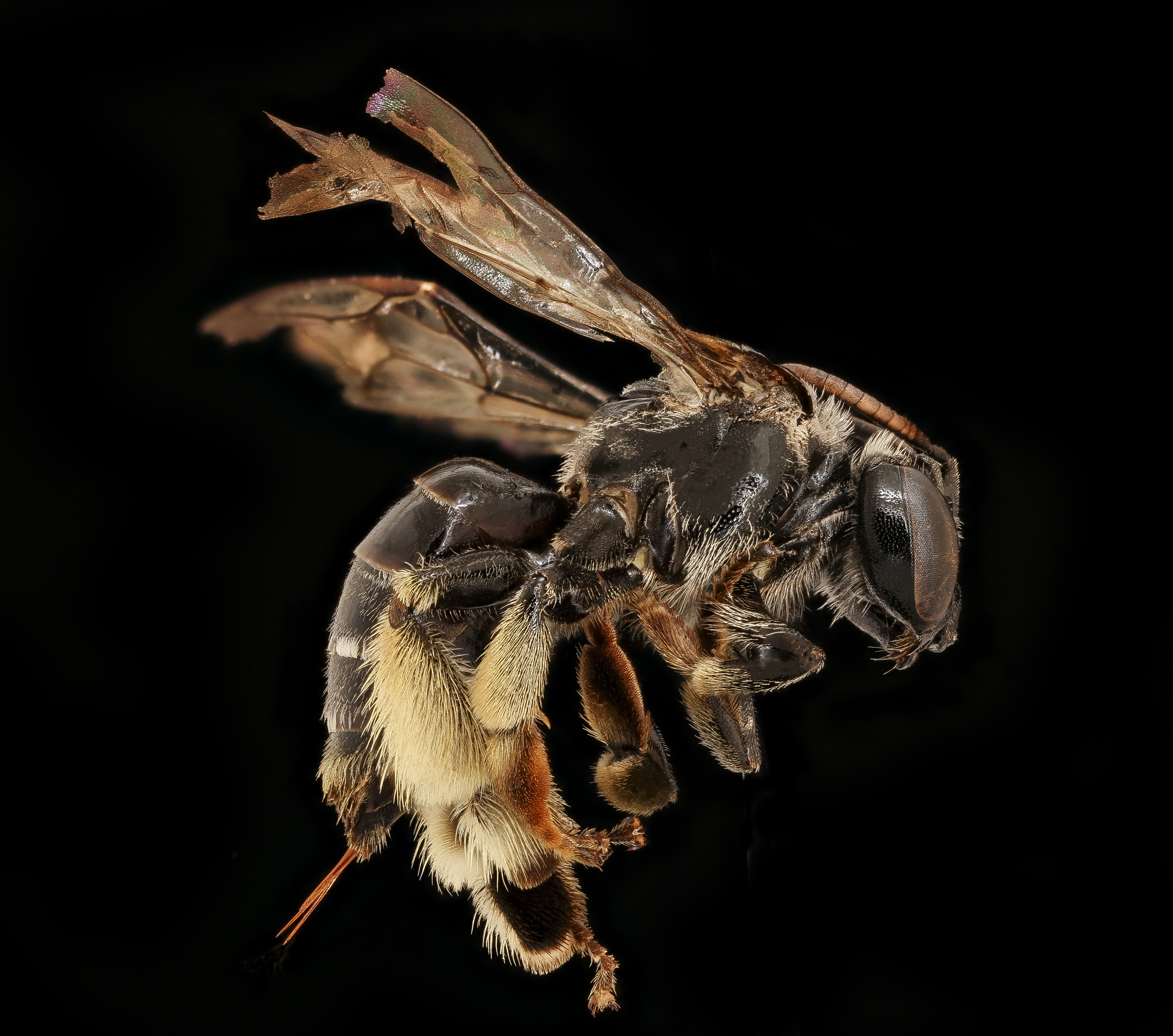

Scientific classification
- Kingdom: Animalia
- Phylum: Arthropoda
- Class: Insecta
- Order: Hymenoptera
- Family: Melittidae
- Genus: Macropis
- Species: M. patellata

Binomial name
- Macropis patellata Patton, 1880

= Macropis patellata =

Species of bee

Macropsis patellata is a solitary bee in the Melittidae family. This species is endemic to the United States with observations in Minnesota, Virginia, North Carolina, Maryland, Vermont, Michigan and Massachusetts. M. patellata is oligolectic and known to feed only on species in the primrose family such as Lysimachia ciliata. In Michigan the species has been a host for Epeoloides pilosulus.
