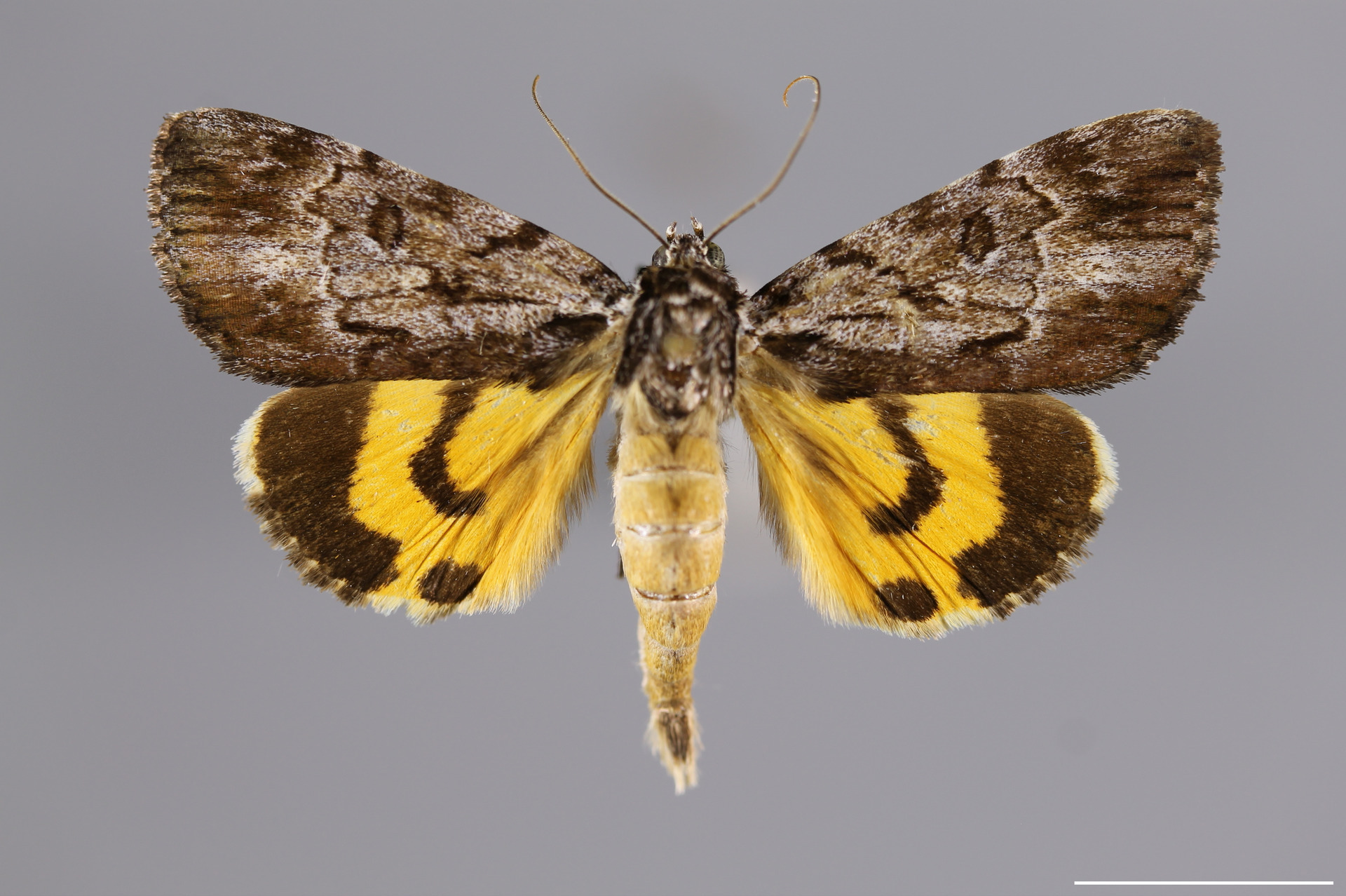

Conservation status
- Apparently Secure (NatureServe)

Scientific classification
- Kingdom: Animalia
- Phylum: Arthropoda
- Clade: Pancrustacea
- Class: Insecta
- Order: Lepidoptera
- Superfamily: Noctuoidea
- Family: Erebidae
- Genus: Catocala
- Species: C. louiseae

Binomial name
- Catocala louiseae Bauer, 1965

Synonyms
- Catocala protonympha Boisduval, 1840; Catocala nebraskae louiseae; Catocala nebraskae var. somnus Dodge, 1881

= Catocala louiseae =

Louise's underwing

Species of moth

Catocala louiseae, or Louise's underwing, is a moth of the family Erebidae. The species is endemic to the United States. The epithet, louiseae, is in honor of "the late Louise (Mrs. E.P.) Mellon" who funded the Carnegie Museum of Natural History expedition on which the type specimen was collected. The species was described by John Bauer in 1965.

== Distribution ==
C. louiseae is found in the United States from North Carolina south to Florida and west through Alabama to Texas. However, the westernmost records (west of Alabama) probably represent Catocala bastropi that was only described in 2017.

== Description ==
The wingspan of C. louiseae is about 40 mm (1.6 in).

== Life cycle ==
Adults of C. louiseae are on wing in May, sometimes into June. The larvae feed on Vaccinium arboreum and probably other blueberries, at least Vaccinium stamineum.

== Taxonomy ==
Catocala louiseae is given precedence per Article 23.9.2 as a nomen protectum over its disused senior subjective synonym Catocala protonympha Boisduval, 1840, which becomes a nomen oblitum.
