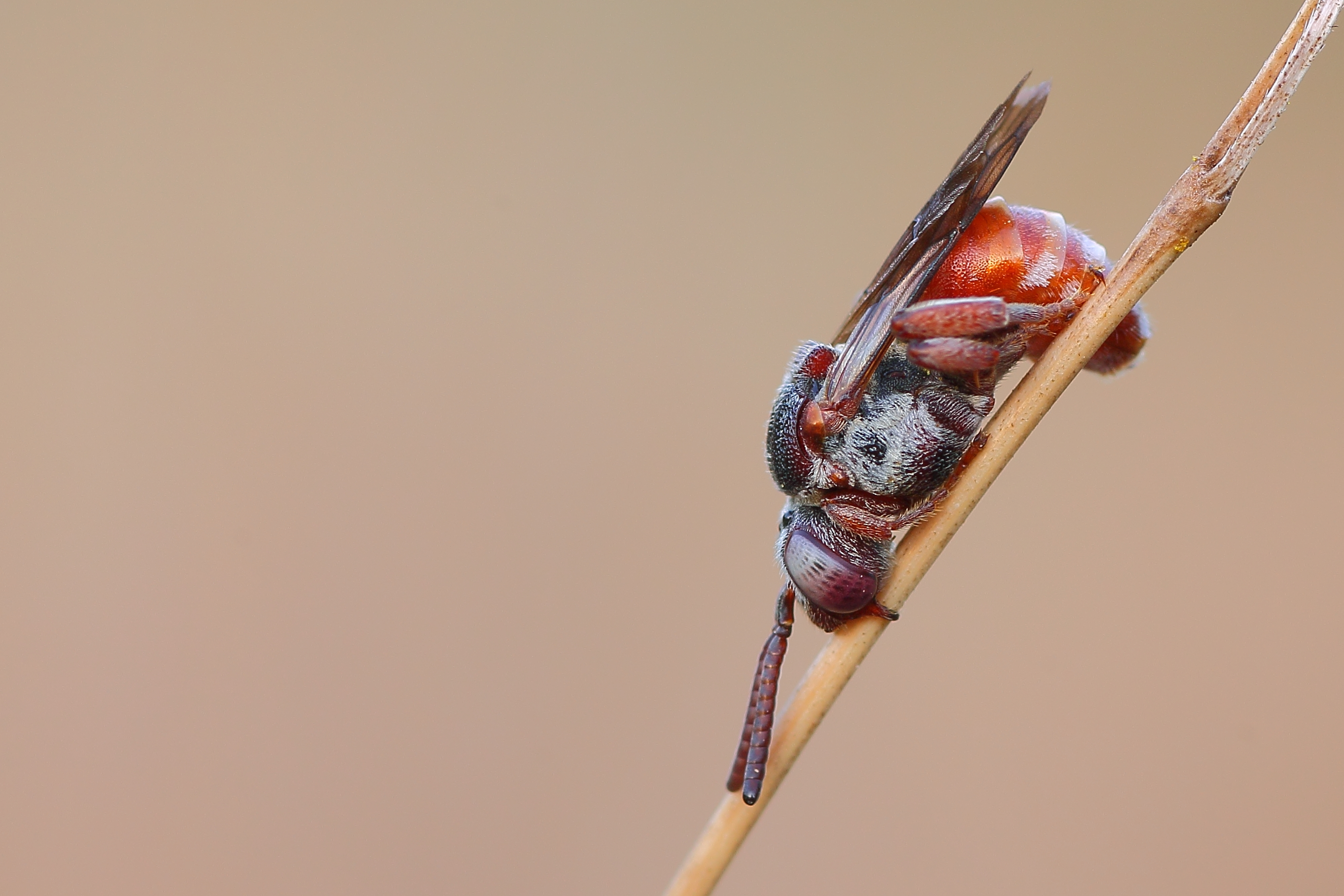
- Epeoloides coecutiens ♀

Scientific classification
- Kingdom: Animalia
- Phylum: Arthropoda
- Clade: Pancrustacea
- Class: Insecta
- Order: Hymenoptera
- Family: Apidae
- Subfamily: Apinae
- Tribe: Osirini; Handslirsch, 1925

Genera
- Epeoloides; Osirinus; Osiris; Parepeolus; Protosiris

= Osirini =

Tribe of bees

The Osirini are a tribe of cuckoo bees in the family Apidae, all but one genus exclusively from the Neotropics, and laying their eggs in the nests of bees in the apid tribe Tapinotaspidini; the one exceptional genus is Epeoloides, which has one North American species and one European species, both of which attack the melittid genus Macropis.

All species in this tribe are unique among the bees in the possession of a tiny sclerite embedded in the membrane beneath the head, possibly to help guard against being stung in the neck by an angry host bee when invading a nest.
