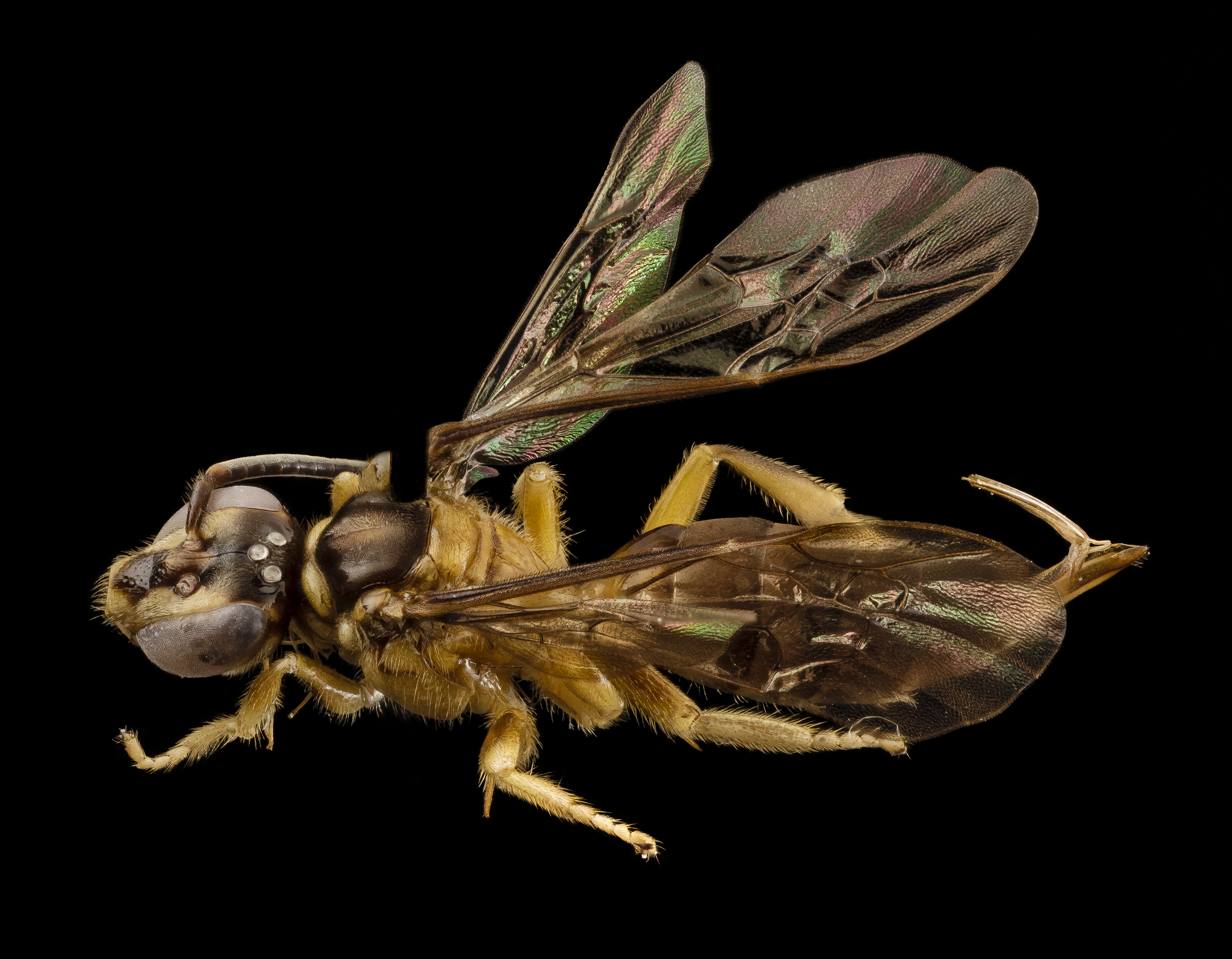

Scientific classification
- Domain: Eukaryota
- Kingdom: Animalia
- Phylum: Arthropoda
- Class: Insecta
- Order: Hymenoptera
- Family: Apidae
- Tribe: Osirini
- Genus: Osiris; Smith, 1854

Species
- >20 species

= Osiris (bee) =

Genus of bees

The cuckoo bee genus Osiris is a rare group of apid bees from the Neotropics (Mexico through Argentina), that lay their eggs in the nests of bees in the related tribe Tapinotaspidini, such as Paratetrapedia. Most of the known species are pale yellowish, smooth and shining, and very wasp-like in appearance.

Females in this tribe are unusual in having the last metasomal sternite elongated to form a sheath for the sting, which is remarkably long.
