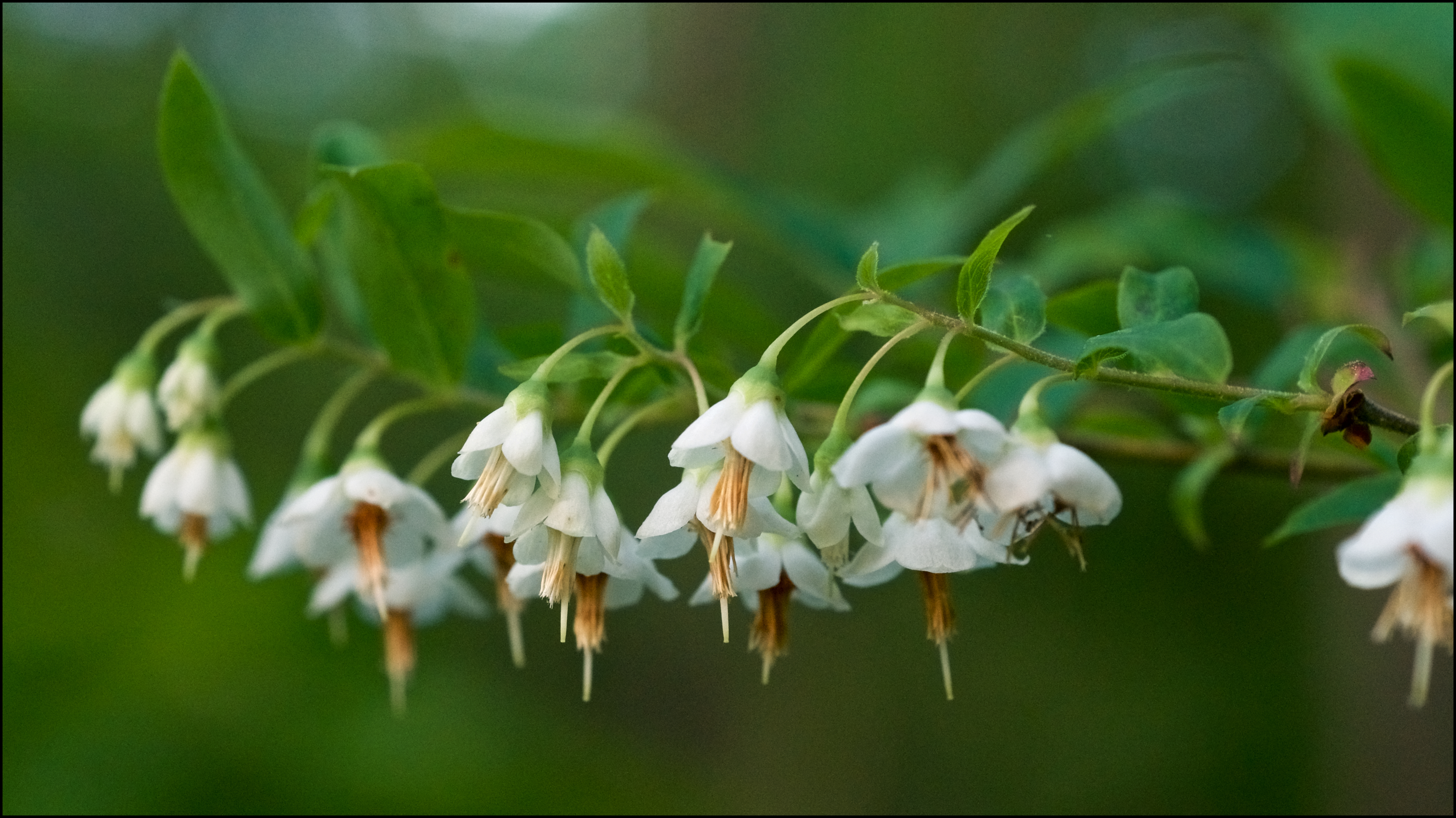

Conservation status
- Secure (NatureServe)

Scientific classification
- Kingdom: Plantae
- Clade: Embryophytes
- Clade: Tracheophytes
- Clade: Spermatophytes
- Clade: Angiosperms
- Clade: Eudicots
- Clade: Asterids
- Order: Ericales
- Family: Ericaceae
- Genus: Vaccinium
- Species: V. stamineum

Binomial name
- Vaccinium stamineum L. 1753

Synonyms
- Synonymy: Polycodium ashei Harbison; Polycodium candicans (C. Mohr) Small; Polycodium depressum Small; Polycodium floridanum (Nuttall) Greene; Polycodium leptosepalum Small; Polycodium macilentum Small; Polycodium melanocarpum (C. Mohr) Small; Polycodium neglectum Small; Polycodium stamineum (Linnaeus) Greene; Vaccinium caesium Greene; Vaccinium melanocarpum (C. Mohr) C. Mohr ex Kearney; Vaccinium neglectum (Small) Fernald; Vaccinium stamineum var. affine (Ashe) Sleumer; Vaccinium stamineum var. austromontanum (Ashe) Sleumer; Vaccinium stamineum var. interius (Ashe) E. J. Palmer & Steyermark; Vaccinium stamineum var. melanocarpum C. Mohr; Vaccinium stamineum var. neglectum (Small) Deam; Vaccinium stamineum var. virginianum (Ashe) Sleumer

= Vaccinium stamineum =

Species of flowering plant

Vaccinium stamineum, commonly known as deerberry, tall deerberry, highbush huckleberry, buckberry, and southern gooseberry, is a North American species of flowering plant in the heath family.

== Description ==
This species is quite variable in morphology. It is a shrub usually growing up to 1.5 meters (5 feet) tall, but reaching up to 3 m (10 ft) at times. It has multiple twisted trunks covered in peeling reddish bark and is highly branched, tapering into thin twigs, some just a millimeter wide. It is deciduous, with alternately arranged leaves. The thin leaf blades are yellow-green, sometimes hairy or waxy in texture, especially on the undersides, and oval in shape with pointed tips and smooth edges. They are up to 7 centimeters (2 3/4 inches) long by 2.5 cm (1 in) wide.

The flowers are borne in hanging inflorescences from the leaf axils. Each flower has five green sepals and a bell-shaped corolla of five fused white petals about 0.5 cm (1/4 in) long. The long, yellow stamens protrude, bearing long, tubular anthers. The style is longer than the stamens. The fruit is a spherical berry about 1 cm wide. It is greenish or yellowish, often with a purple tinge. The species is diploid and has 24 chromosomes.

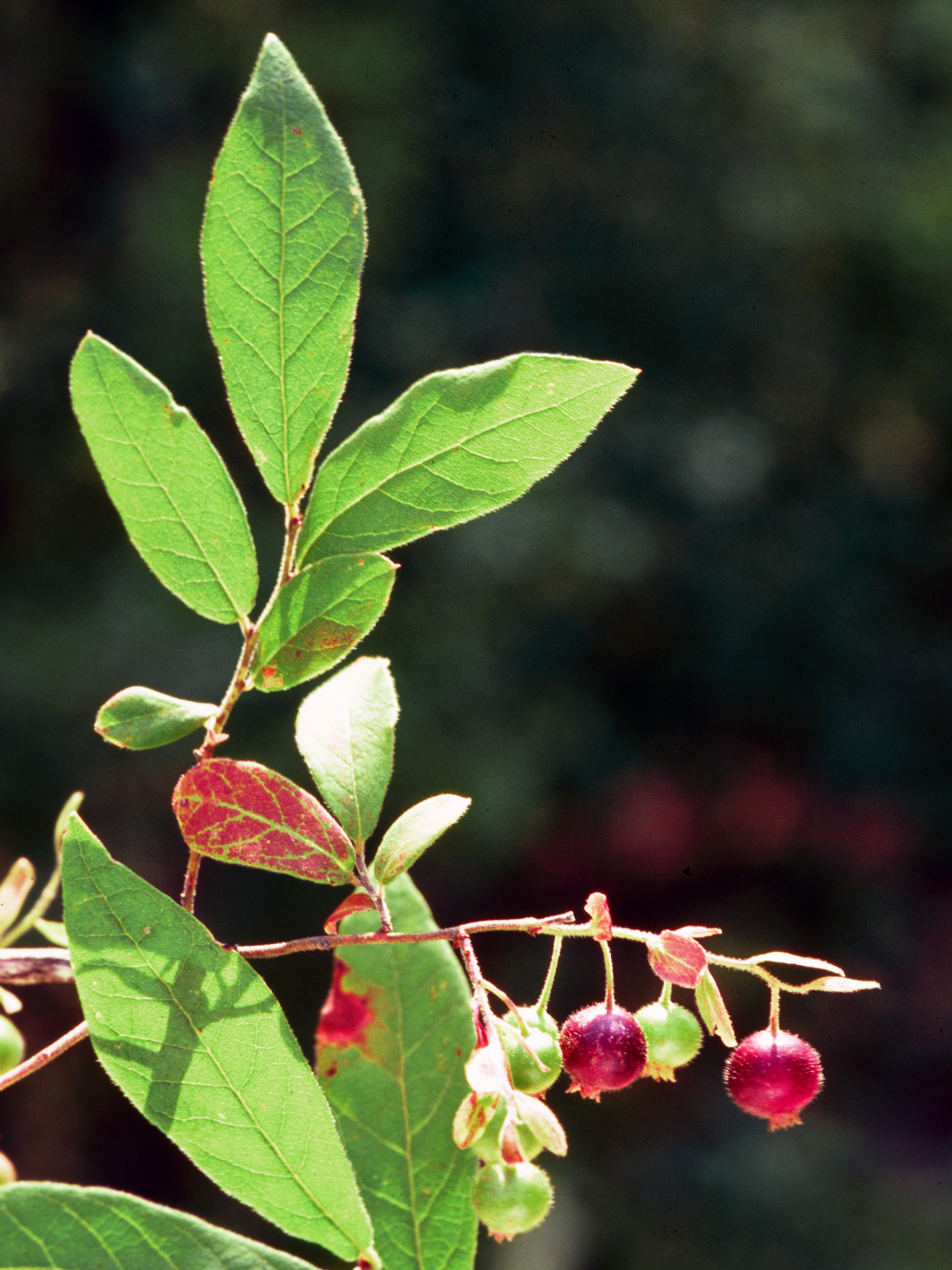
Fruits

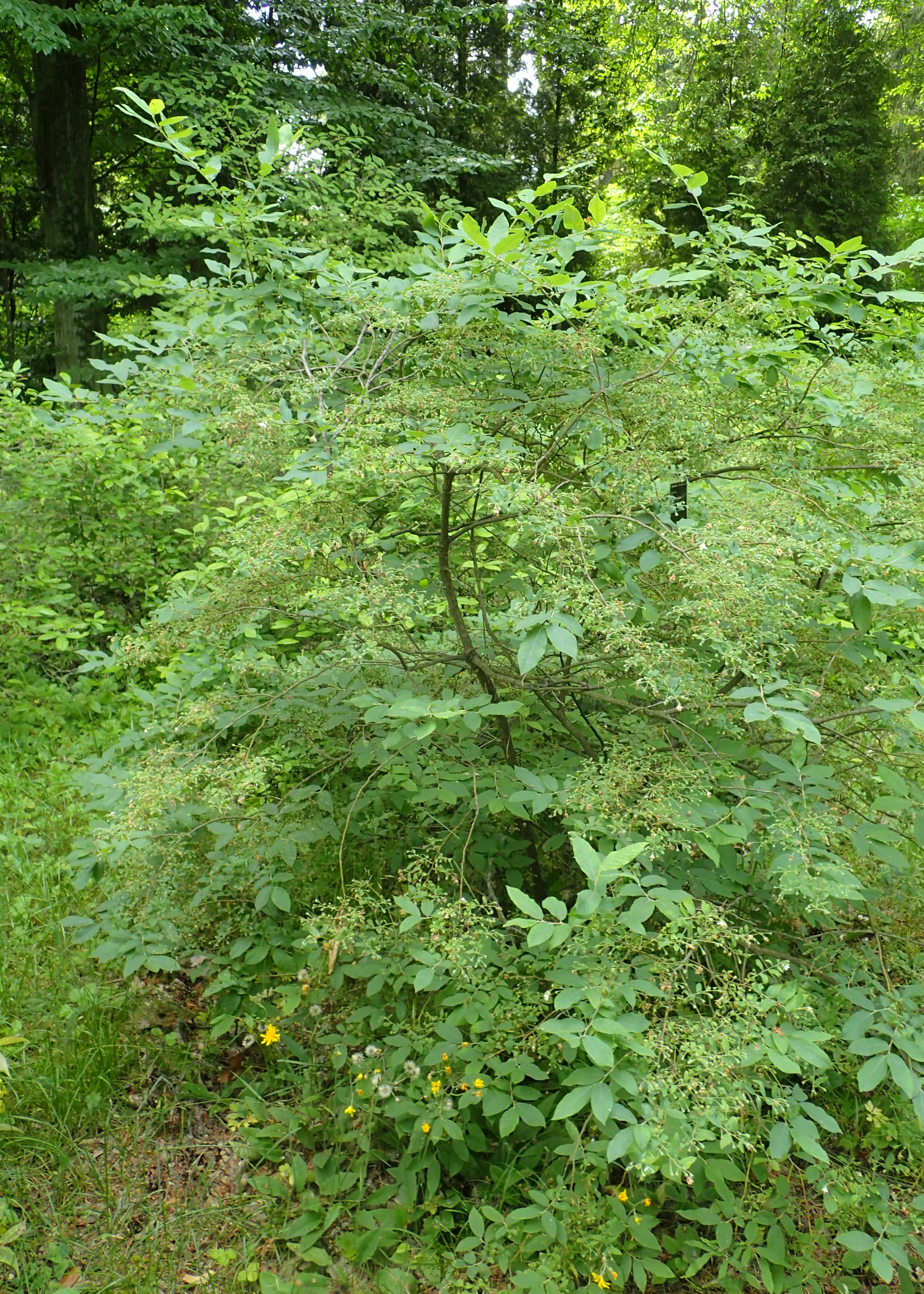
Habitat

== Distribution and habitat ==
It is native to North America, including Ontario, the central and eastern United States, and parts of Mexico. It is most common in the southeastern US.

This plant usually grows in dry, rocky habitat types in forests and fields, but it sometimes occurs in moist areas such as bogs and swamps. It grows in acidic, well-drained soils. It is wildfire-adapted and associated with fire-tolerant vegetation.

== Ecology ==
The plant establishes via seed and commonly spreads via woody rhizomes, with a single plant forming what appears to be a thicket with many trunks. Because most of the mass of the plant is underground, it easily survives fire and the above-ground parts grow back.

The fruits are large for a Vaccinium species. They are an important food source for many kinds of wildlife. They are eagerly consumed by deer along with the twigs and foliage, the inspiration for the common names deerberry and buckberry. Smaller animals gather fallen fruits from the ground. They are food for many songbirds, ruffed grouse, bobwhite quail, wild turkey, foxes, raccoons, black bears, chipmunks, and squirrels.

The plant is pollinated by bees, the primary pollinator being Melitta eickworti. Bees dislodge, accumulate, and disperse pollen with buzz pollination while foraging nectar from the bell-shaped flowers. This species is a host to the blueberry maggot (Rhagoletis mendax), a pest of blueberry crops.

Vaccinium stamineum is insect pollinated and is recorded to have been visited in northern Florida by Augochloropsis metallica, Augochloropsis sumptuosa, Megachile addenda, Melitta americana, Xylocopa micans.

== Uses ==
The fruit is edible for humans, and the taste has been described as tart, sour, bitter, or "sweet-spicy tasting, a little reminiscent of lady's perfume". It has long been collected in the southern US for preserves and pie filling. Deerberries contain potent free radical scavenging activities. However, deerberry is of the Vaccinium genus, which typically contains high amounts of oxalates.
