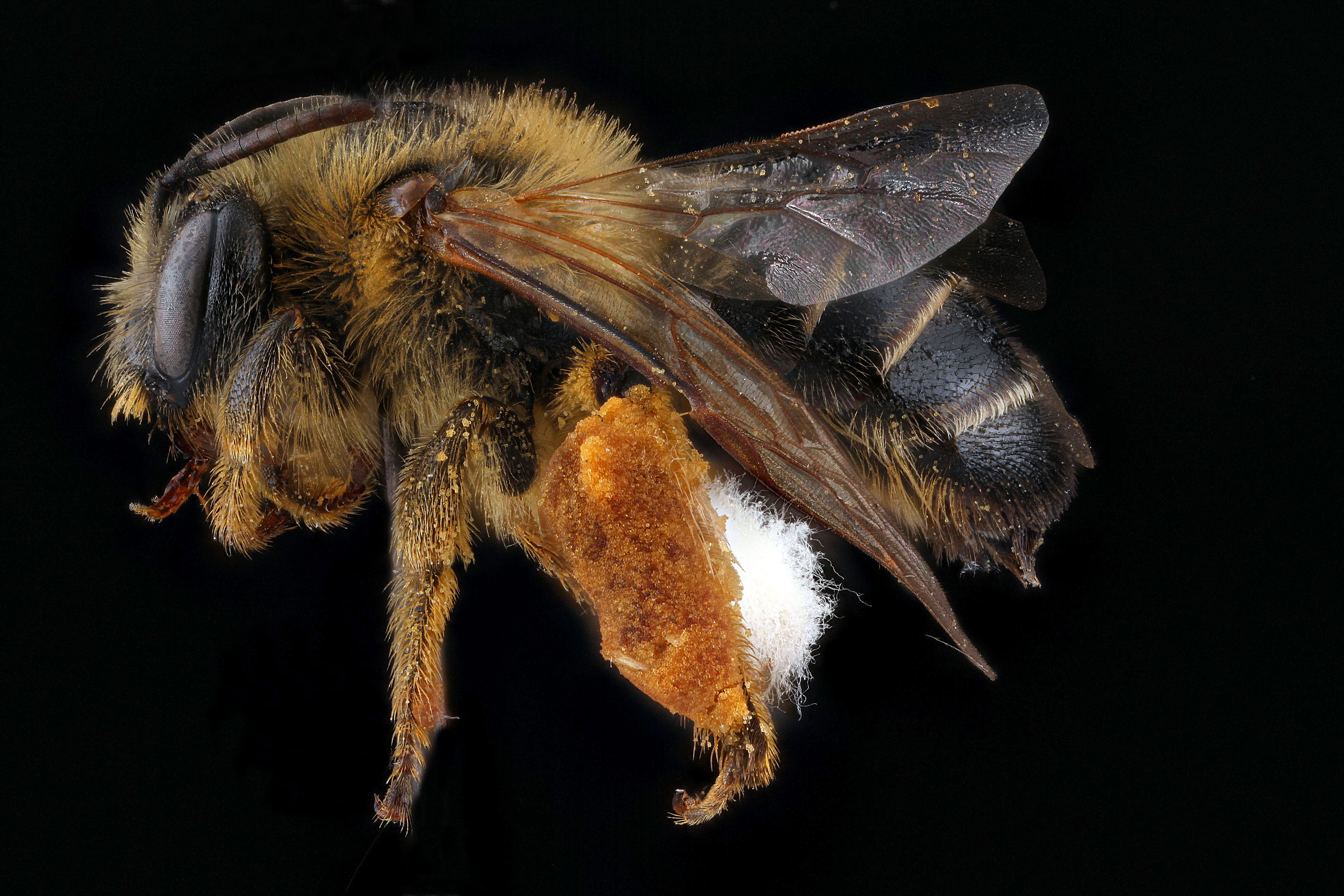

Scientific classification
- Domain: Eukaryota
- Kingdom: Animalia
- Phylum: Arthropoda
- Class: Insecta
- Order: Hymenoptera
- Family: Melittidae
- Subfamily: Melittinae
- Genus: Melitta
- Species: M. eickworti

Binomial name
- Melitta eickworti Snelling & Stage, 1995

= Melitta eickworti =

Species of bee

Melitta eickworti is a species of melittid bee in the family Melittidae. It is found in North America.
