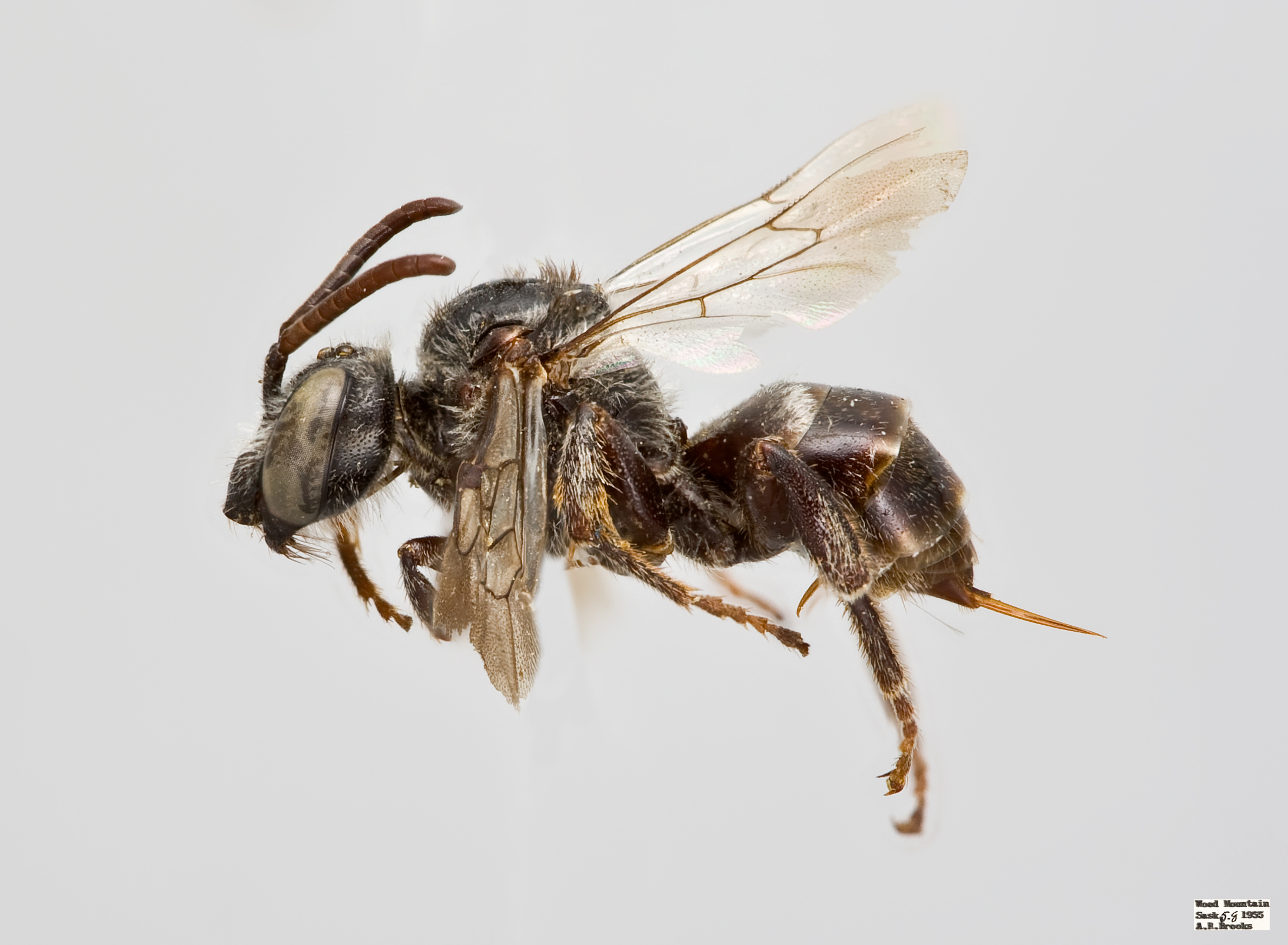
- Female (upper) and male (lower)
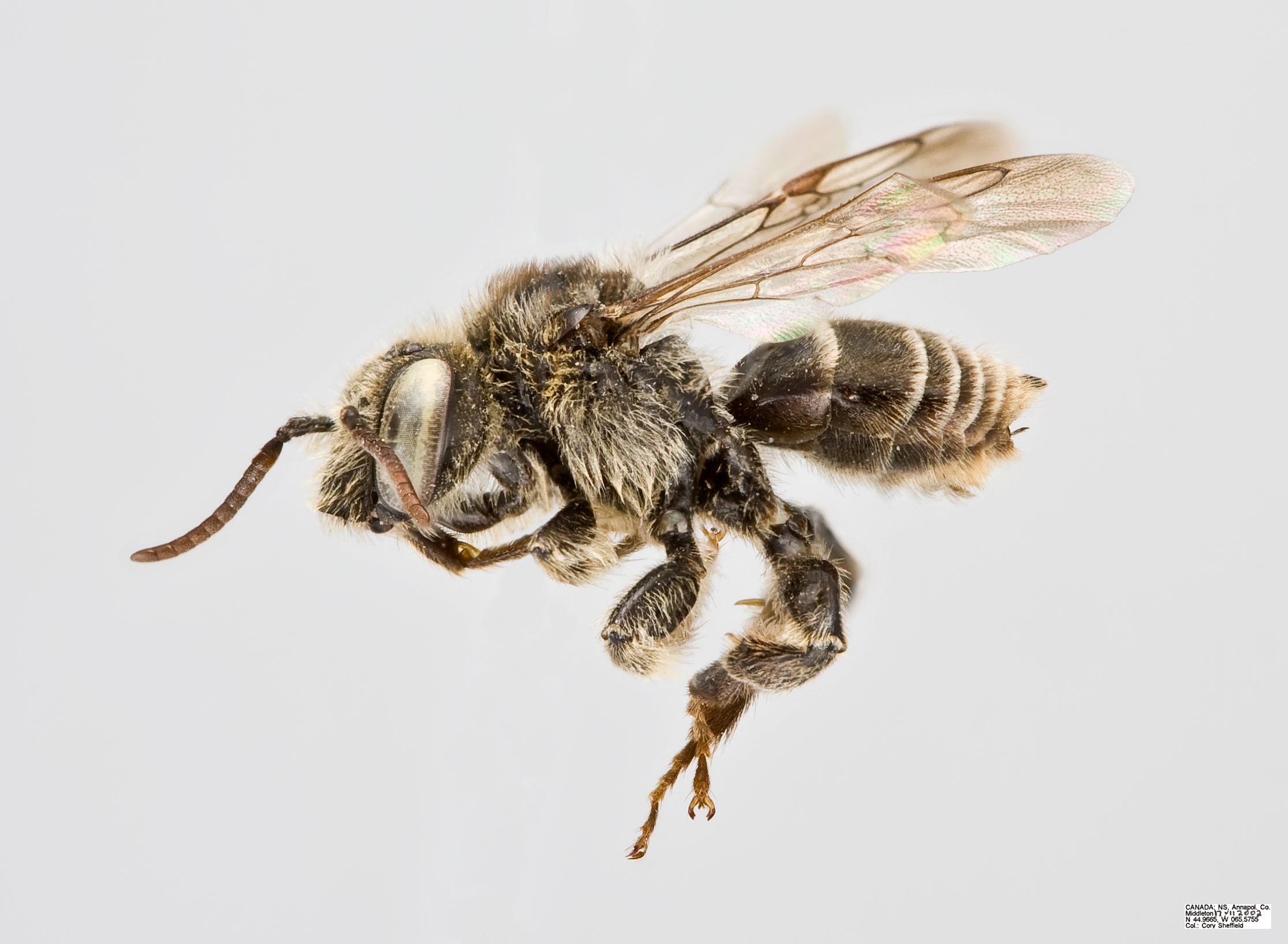

Scientific classification
- Kingdom: Animalia
- Phylum: Arthropoda
- Clade: Pancrustacea
- Class: Insecta
- Order: Hymenoptera
- Family: Apidae
- Genus: Epeoloides
- Species: E. pilosulus

Binomial name
- Epeoloides pilosulus (Cresson, 1878)

Synonyms
- Nomada pilosula Cresson, 1878; Nomia compacta (Provancher, 1888); Epeolus pilosulus (Provancher, 1888); Viereckella ceanothina (Cockerell, 1907); Epeoloides nearticus (Ducke, 1909)

= Epeoloides pilosulus =

Species of bee

Epeoloides pilosulus (also sometimes referred to as Epeoloides pilosula), or the macropis cuckoo bee, is a species of kleptoparasitic (cuckoo) bee within the family Apidae. They are found in moist habitats along swamps, streams, and ponds near the nest aggregations of their Macropis (oil-collecting bee) hosts. They are considered a very rare and possibly endangered species with sparse observations across the Central and Eastern United States and Canada.

== Taxonomy ==
Epeoloides pilosulus is one of two species within the Epeoloides genus. They belong to the Apidae family and the Osirini tribe, a tribe entirely consisting of parasitic bees who primarily rely on oil-collecting bees as hosts. E. pilosulus is the only Osirini species present in Canada and the United States.

Epeoloides pilosulus was first described from a single New York specimen in 1878 by E. T. Cresson. At the time of description, it was placed in the Nomada genus before being shifted to Epeoloides by Ducke in 1909.

== Description ==
Epeoloides pilosulus are medium-sized, 7.5–10 mm bees with a shiny, entirely black body covered in fine pale hairs (significantly greater pubescence on their head and thorax than most other Osirini or other cuckoo bees). While the apical edges of the abdominal terga have fine bands of dense white hair, there are no red or yellow markings on the abdomen setting them apart from other kleptoparasites such as Nomada.

Wings have “dusky” coloring near the margin and three submarginal cells in the forewing venation, the second of which is significantly smaller than the first and third. The marginal cell bends away from the edge of the wing at its apex.

Like other kleptoparasitic bees, females lack scopae for collecting pollen. Males have large eyes that converge strongly near the top of their head and a unique pygidial plate nearly surrounded by strong carinae (ridges).

Being the only bee in the Tribe Osirini within its North American range, E. pilosulus can also be recognized by distinct Osirini traits, including a round sclerite in their cervical membrane and a large stigma in the venation of their forewing (over three times as long as the pre-stigma).

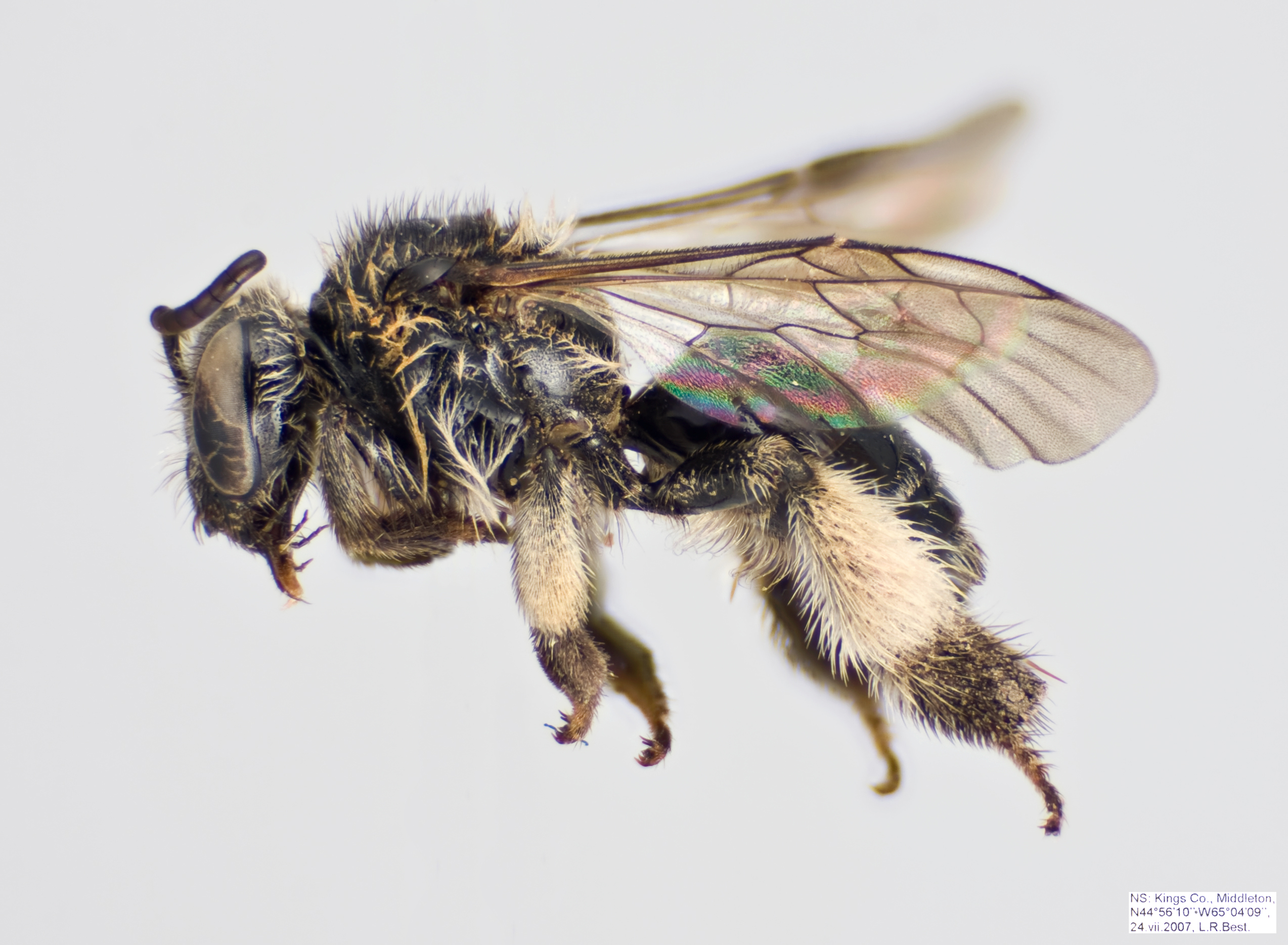
Female Macropis nuda, a main host of E. pilosulus

== Life cycle and behavior ==
Given the scarcity of records, little is concretely known about the behavior and life of E. pilosulus. They are obligate parasites of Macropis (Melittidae) bees, often found in regions with Macropis nests and near Lysimachia (yellow loosestrife), the main Macropis source of pollen and nectar. Based on historical and current range, they are thought to likely parasitize multiple species within this genus, most significantly Macropis nuda.

Adults emerge in mid-summer with an active period from June to July. During this active period, they mate, feed on pollen and nectar, and females look for hosts. They nectar on a variety of flower species but largely collect no pollen, instead relying on the pollen collection of their hosts.

Much of the life history data of immature stages is assumed to be similar to their corresponding European species, Epeoloides coecutiens, which has been more well observed. Eggs are laid in the host nest, and after hatching, they kill the host egg or larva before consuming the host-collected pollen provisions. The offspring likely overwinter as fourth or fifth instar larvae before pupating and emerging as adults in the summer.

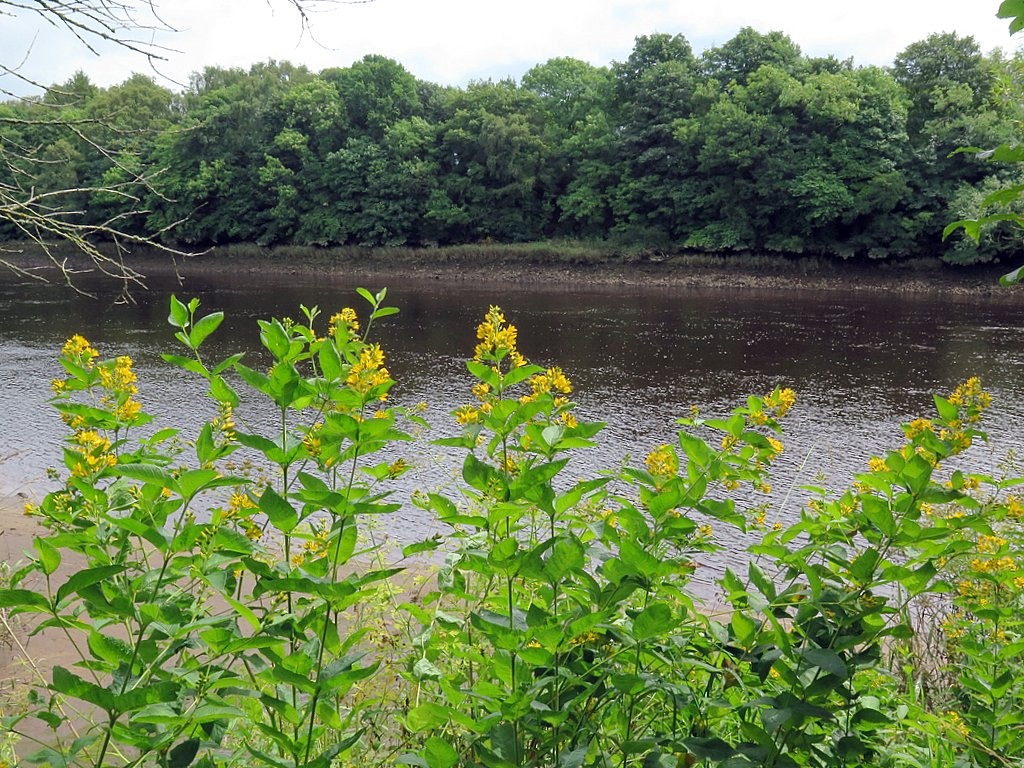
A riverside patch of Lysimachia, similar to a habitat in E. pilosulus could be found in

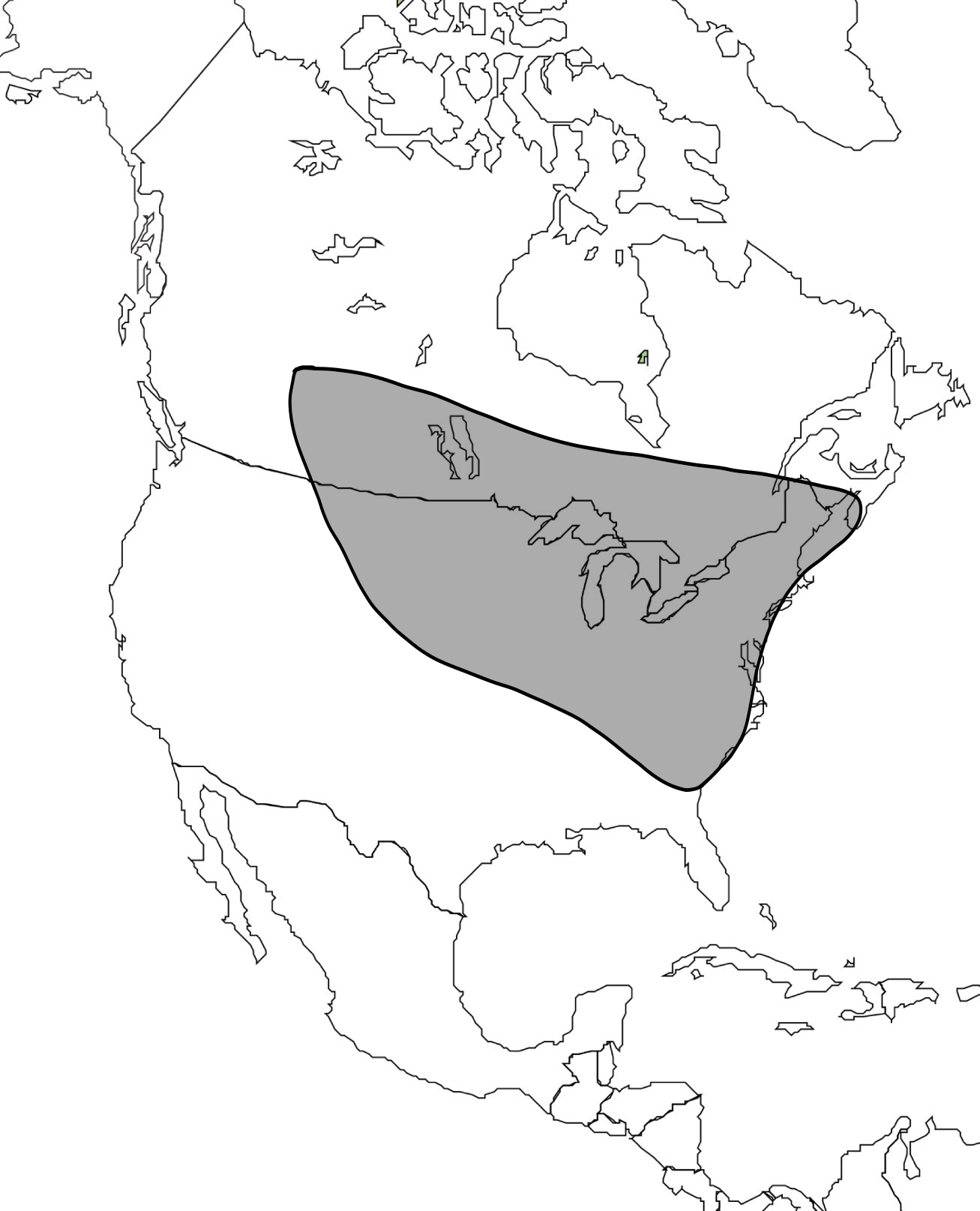
Approximate presumed range based on COSEWIC (2011) and Sheffield & Heron (2018)

== Distribution and habitat ==
Though sparsely recorded within the last hundred years, E. pilosulus has historically been found across a large swath of eastern and central United States and Canada from Alberta and North Dakota to Maine and Georgia. Within the last 80 years, scarce observations have limited the current range knowledge.

Their habitat include moist regions such as swamps, streams, ponds, and lake margins where Lysimachia grows. Though Lysimachia is widespread, the mere presence of the plant cannot be used as a strong indicator for either Macropis or Epeoloides presence.

== Risk and conservation ==
While they were frequently collected and observed in the 19th and early 20th centuries, there was an almost complete absence of records of this bee from the 1950s to the early 2000s, leading many people to believe E. pilosulus to be endangered if not extinct. However, since being rediscovered in Nova Scotia in 2004, there have been several additional published rediscoveries:

- Connecticut, 2008 (Wagner, & Ascher, 2008)
- York County, Maine, 2016 (Dibble et al, 2017)
- Elk Island National Park, Alberta, 2018 (Sheffield & Heron, 2018)
- New Hampshire, 2019 (Wagner, 2019)
- Midland County, Michigan, 2019 (Wood et al, 2019)
- Sandilands Provincial Forest, Manitoba, 2021 (Gibbs et al., 2021)

Due to their specialization and host reliance, cuckoo bees are generally found in lower abundances than other non-parasitic bees. This contributes to their rarity and can make conservation assessments difficult.

In 2011, the Committee on the Status of Endangered Wildlife in Canada (COSEWIC) designated E. pilosulus as Endangered, but in May 2025, it was instead designated as Data Deficient. In 2005, the Xerces Society designated this bee to be Critically Imperiled and at high risk of extinction. The U.S. Fish and Wildlife does not have a listed threat ranking for E. pilosulus.

Epeoloides pilosulus are reliant on their Macropis host population, which are in turn specialists on Lysimachia. As such, their survival is highly and specifically dependent on the health of these additional populations. Loss and reduction of Macropis habitat and nest aggregations presents the most significant threat to the species survival. Their range is highly dependent on the swampy habitats of Lysimachia that are becoming increasingly fragmented, preventing gene flow between both the floral and bee populations.

While E. pilosulus populations remain very limited, the other Epeoloides species, Epeoloides coecutiens, remains more common.
