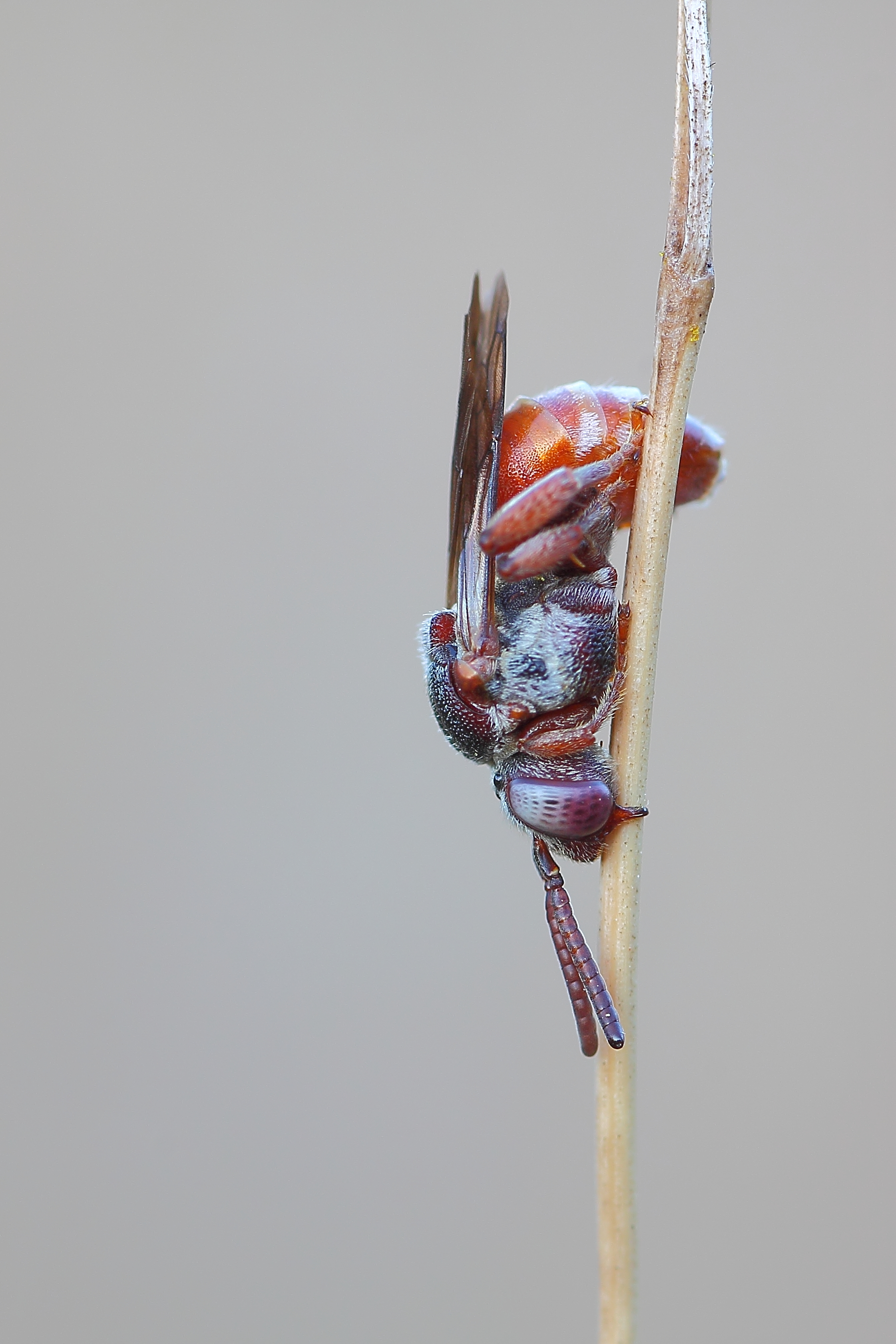
- Epeoloides coecutiens ♀

Scientific classification
- Kingdom: Animalia
- Phylum: Arthropoda
- Class: Insecta
- Order: Hymenoptera
- Family: Apidae
- Subfamily: Apinae
- Tribe: Osirini
- Genus: Epeoloides; Giraud, 1863

Synonyms
- Viereckella Swenk, 1907

= Epeoloides =

Genus of bees

Epeoloides is a genus of cuckoo bees which lay their eggs in the nests of melittid bees of the genus Macropis. One species, Epeoloides pilosulus, is classified as Endangered by the State of Connecticut.

== Species ==
- Epeoloides coecutiens (Fabricius, 1775)
- Epeoloides pilosulus (Cresson, 1878)
