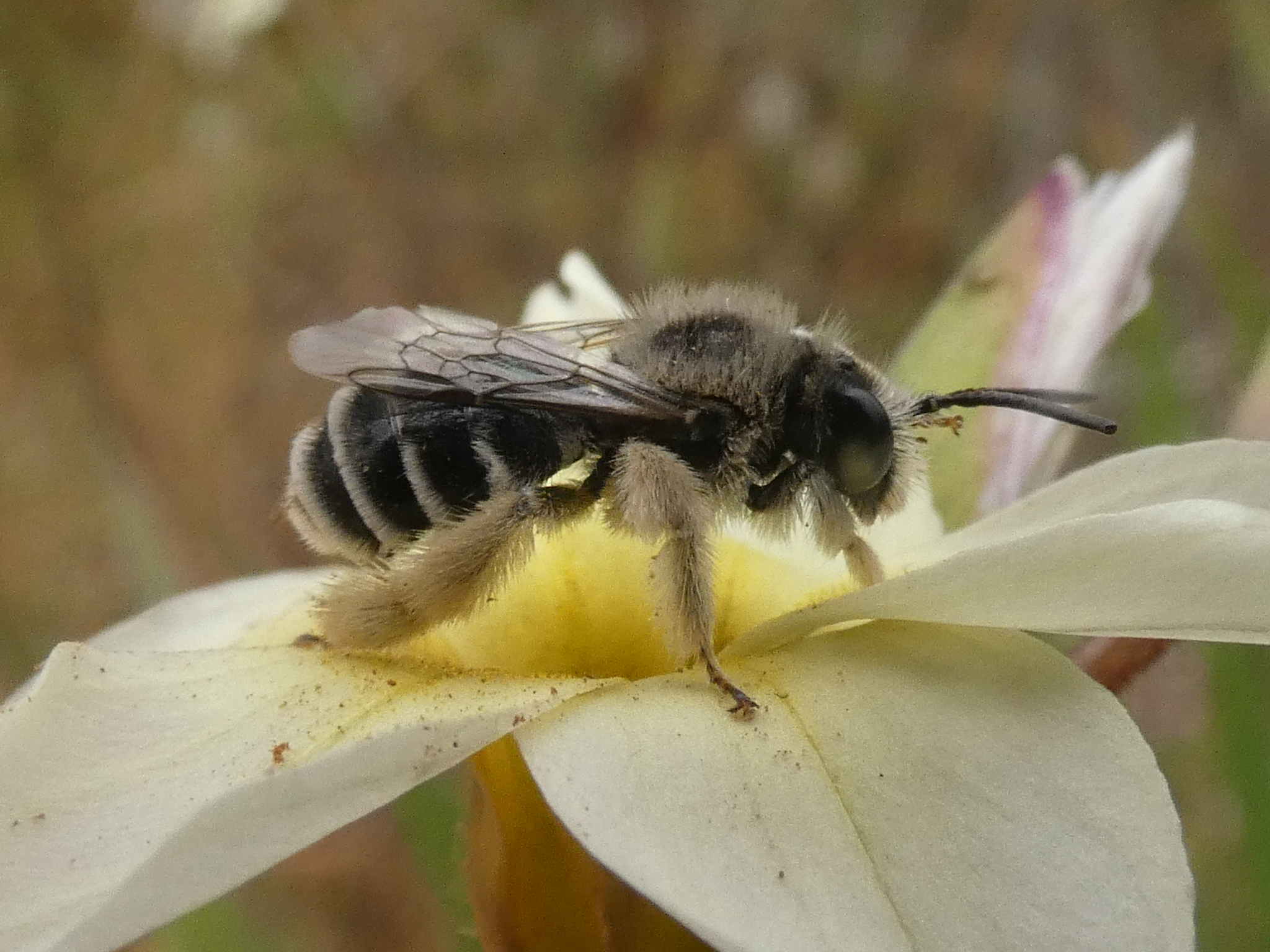
- Chalepogenus herbsti visiting Sisyrinchium striatum

Scientific classification
- Kingdom: Animalia
- Phylum: Arthropoda
- Clade: Pancrustacea
- Class: Insecta
- Order: Hymenoptera
- Family: Apidae
- Tribe: Tapinotaspidini
- Genus: Chalepogenus
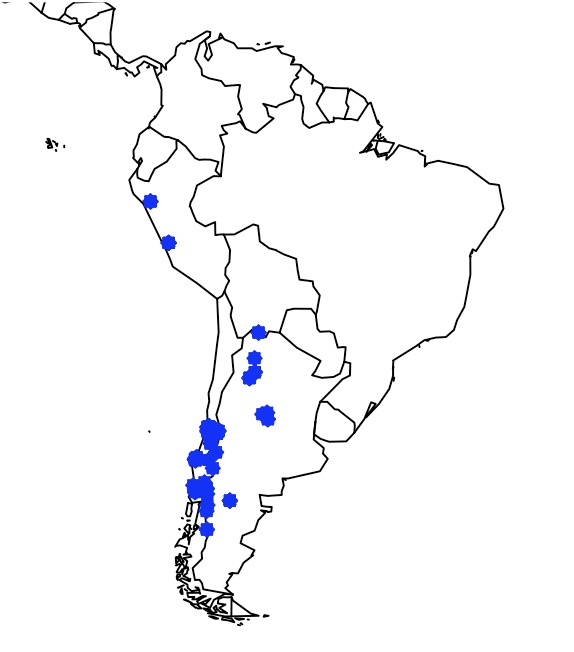
- Observations of Chalepogenus from iNaturalist (as of October, 2023).

= Chalepogenus =

Genus of bees

The genus Chalepogenus, consisting of 21 species of solitary oil-collecting apid bees, demonstrates oligolecty by foraging on oil-producing flowers from the families Calceolariaceae, Iridaceae and Solanaceae. These oil-flowers are abundant in South America, where Chalepogenus is endemic. In contrast to honey bees, Chalepogenus species do not collect nectar; instead, they gather floral oil for various purposes, including provisioning their larvae, constructing nests, and sustaining foraging adult bees. Although oil collection has been reported to be performed by females only, both males and females have specialised oil-collecting structures.

== Distribution ==
Species of Chalepogenus are restricted to South America.

== Morphology ==
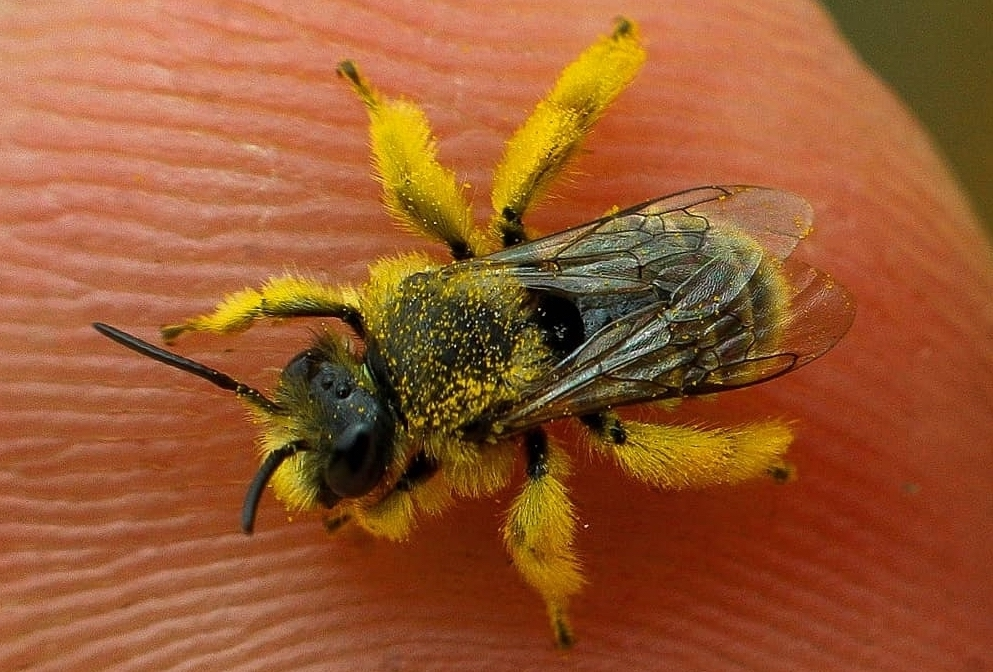
Chalepogenus herbsti (Herbst's Mini-Oil Digger).

Bees belonging to the genus Chalepogenus are relatively small compared to honey bees; their body size ranges from 4.2 to 10.0 millimetres. Chalepogenus species are hairy and exhibit diverse colouration, with some having a black integument (e.g. C. cocuccii), and others displaying yellow markings on their head, thorax, legs, or metasoma (e.g. C. herbsti). Additionally, certain species exhibit red colouring on their legs or metasoma (e.g. C. rufipes), while others have bluish metallic reflections (e.g. C. caeruleus).

=== Oil-collecting structures ===
The oil-collecting structures (pad and comb) of Chalepogenus bees are covered by setae and are located on the posterior surface of the forebasitarsus. The bees exhibit interspecific variation based on the flower type they forage:

- Some Chalepogenus species (e.g. C. rufipes) forage on flowers possessing trichome elaiophores. To do so, they reach the floral oil with their forelegs, making their bulging pad soaked.
- Other Chalepogenus species (e.g. C. cocuccii) collect oil from flowers that possess epithelial elaiophores, by sweeping floral oil with their compound comb of setae. These species have a non-bulging pad.

== Pollination ==
Chalepogenus oil-collecting bees pollinate plant species belonging to the families Calceolariaceae, Iridaceae and Solanaceae.

=== Calceolariaceae ===
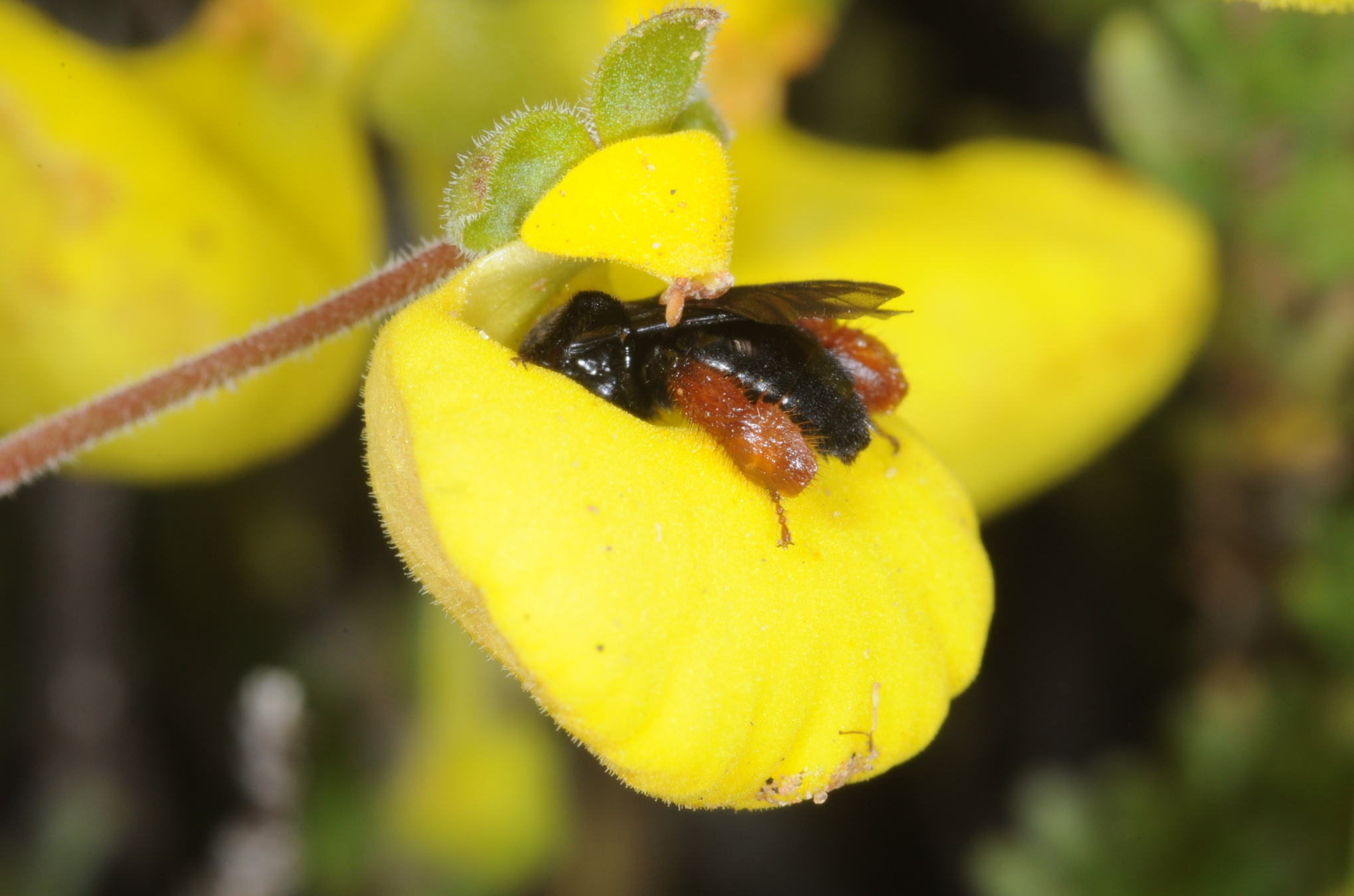
Chalepogenus rufipes (Red-legged Mini-Oil Digger) visiting a Calceolaria flower.

The family Calceolariaceae is composed of three genera, namely Calceolaria, Jovellana, and Porodittia. Calceolaria is the most successful oil-producing genus present in the Neotropical realm, with 210 oil-producing species. This genus is pollinated by Chalepogenus and Centris oil-collecting bees. These bees, distinguished by their varying sizes and foraging capabilities, visit oil-flowers of different sizes and shapes to collect oil, effectively ensuring pollination for Calceolaria.

Chalepogenus oil-collecting forage on Calceolaria flowers of small size, with a wide lower lip. It has been speculated that both of these criteria enhance the bees' ability to land and manipulate the flowers.

A single floral visit extends for a minimum of 30 seconds. Chalepogenus bees initiate their visit by landing on the labellum and search for the flower's opening. Once they have found it, the bees use their heads to push aside the hindmost part of the two anthers, thereby revealing the previously hidden frontal section that contains Calceolaria pollen. The bees become dorsally coated with this pollen during this process; in other words, they pollinate Calceolaria flowers nototribically. As they collect oil with their forelegs, the majority of their bodies remains hidden within the labellum, with only their hindlegs visible from outside. Upon completing their oil collection, the bees back out and ipsilaterally transfer the collected oil from forelegs, to middle legs, then to hindlegs.

=== Iridaceae ===
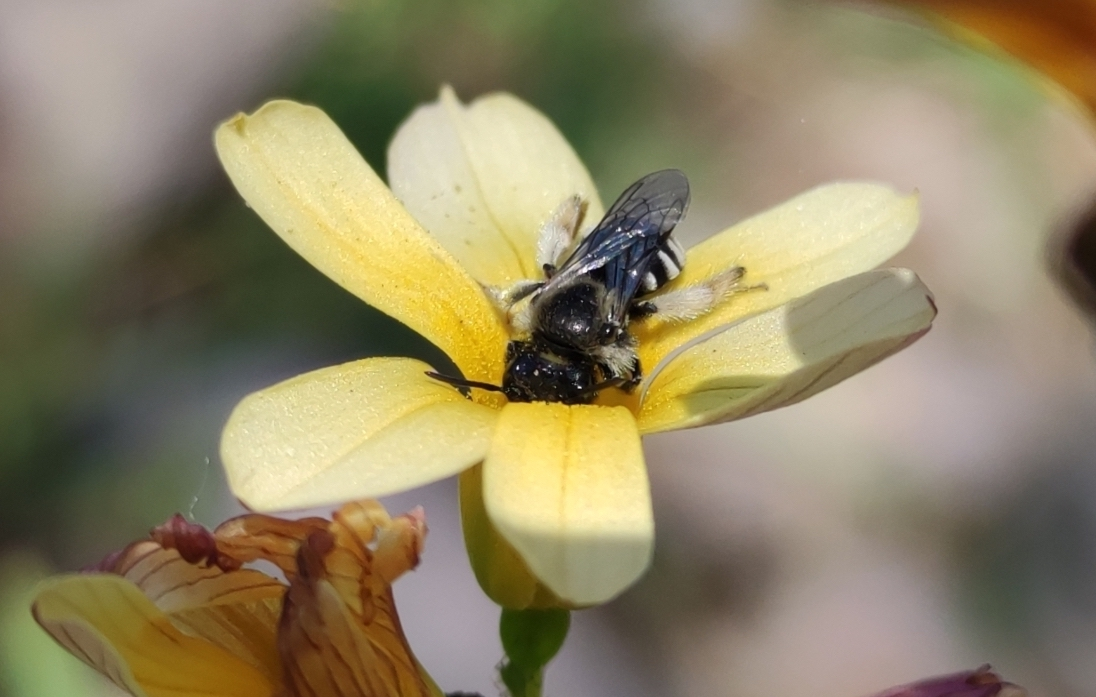
Chalepogenus herbsti (Herbst's Mini-Oil Digger) visiting an Iridaceae flower.

The family Iridaceae comprises seven subfamilies, and within the subfamily Iridoideae, there are five tribes. One of these tribes is the Sisyrinchieae, which consists of four genera exclusively found in the Americas: Olsynium, Sisyrinchium, Solenomelus, and Tapeinia. Among Neotropical Iridoideae, the genus Sisyrinchium is the most diverse. Many of its species produce floral oil, which attracts oil-collecting pollinators, such as Chalepogenus bees.

The oil-collecting bees take approximately 1 to 3 seconds to exploit each flower. Upon landing on the perianth, they insert themselves deep into the flower by firmly grasping the horizontal part of the perianth with their middle and hindlegs. As a result, the undersides of the pollinators' head and thorax are in contact with the stamen and stylodia. By doing so, they perform sternotribic pollination, in which ventral regions of the bees become covered by pollen. Although movements of the oil-collecting forelegs may not be visible, it is evident that the bees manipulate the filament column of the flower and collect floral oil.

=== Solanaceae ===
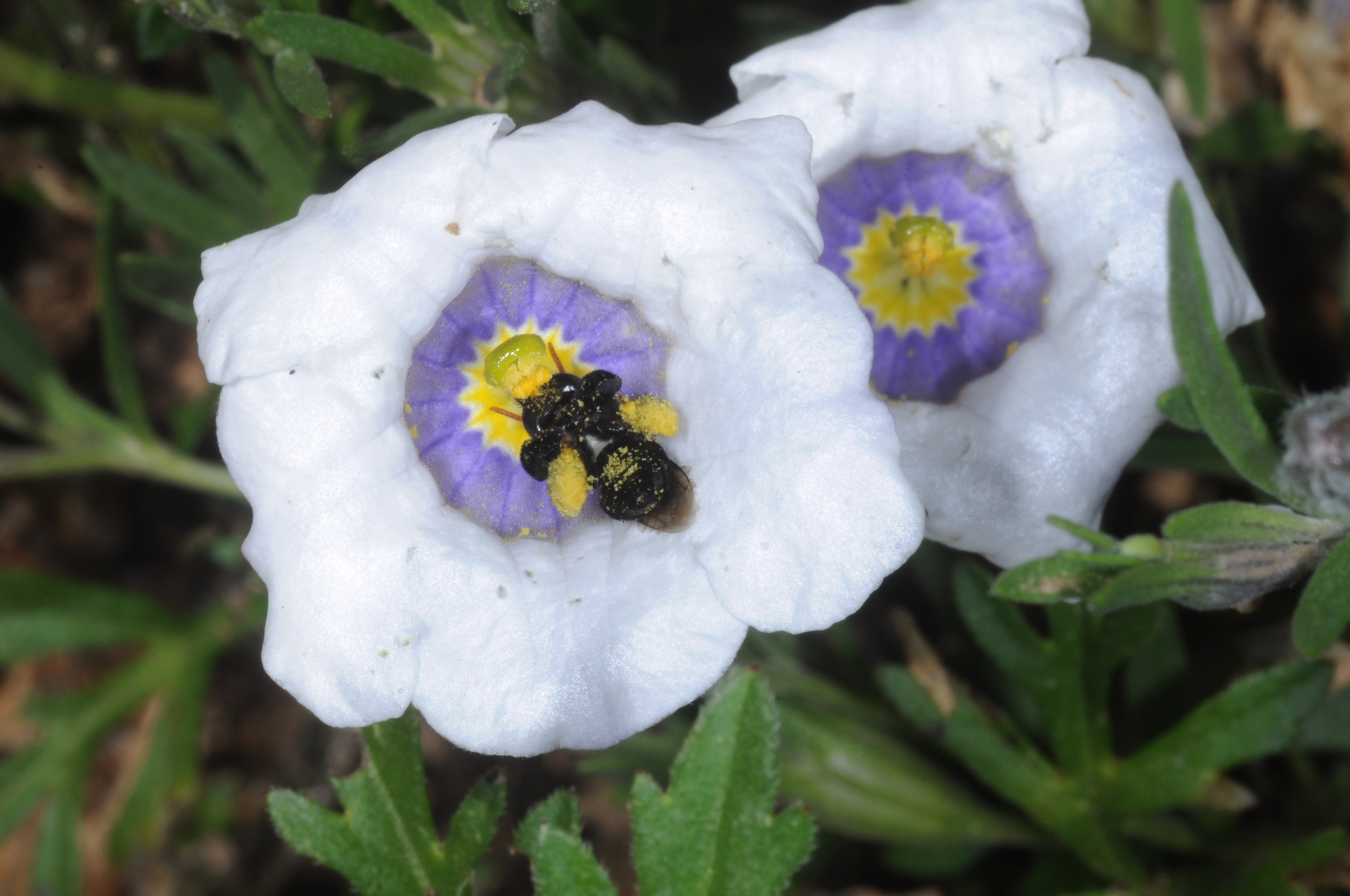
Chalepogenus cocuccii (Cocucci's Mini-Oil Digger) visiting a Nierembergia flower in a vertical bottom-up position.

Within the family Solanaceae, which includes 98 genera, Nierembergia is the sole genus that offers non-volatile oil as a floral reward to pollinators, which are oil-collecting bees primarily belonging to the genera Tapinotaspis, Centris, and Chalepogenus. Chalepogenus bee species exhibit distinctive foraging behaviours by actively collecting both oil and pollen, in contrast to Tapinotaspis and Centris bees, which exclusively collect floral oil.

During the oil collection process, the oil-collecting bees land on the corolla limb and circle around the central fertile column to collect oil using their forelegs. This results in nototribic pollination, which is the deposition of pollen on oil-collectors’ heads. In contrast, when Chalepogenus bee species collect pollen, they climb to the top of the central fertile column, and secure their grip just below the anthers using their mandibles. In a vertical, bottom-up posture, the bees collect pollen with their forelegs, and transfer it to the scopas located on their hindlegs. This specific positioning above the floral fertile parts leads to sternotribic pollination, which is characterised by the deposition of pollen from the anthers onto various ventral body regions of the pollinator, including the abdomen and legs. Therefore, by exhibiting both nototribic and sternotribic pollination, Chalepogenus bee species enhance the probability of effective pollination for Nierembergia species.

== Taxonomy ==
In the Neotropical realm, there are three tribes of oil-collecting bees, namely Tapinotaspidini, Centridini, and Tetrapediini. The genus Chalepogenus belongs to the tribe Tapinotaspidini and is composed of 21 species:

- C. bicellularis
- C. caeruleus
- C. calceolariae
- C. clypeolatus
- C. cocuccii
- C. crassifasciatus
- C. goeldianus
- C. herbsti
- C. luciane
- C. muelleri
- C. neffi
- C. nigripes
- C. parvus
- C. perimelaena
- C. rasmusseni
- C. roitmani
- C. rozeni
- C. rufipes
- C. subcaeruleus
- C. unicolor
- C. vogeli
