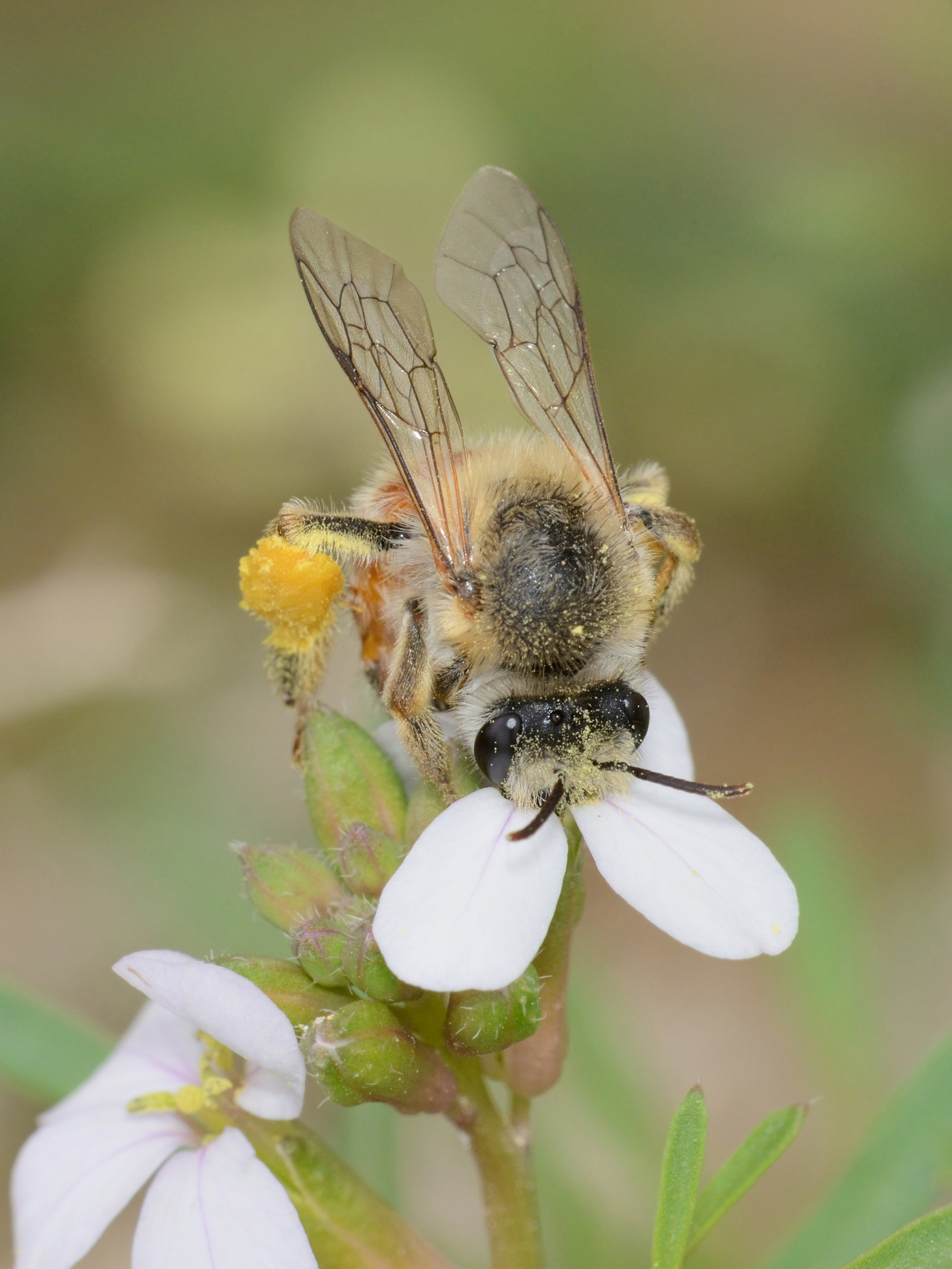
- Melitta maura, female

Scientific classification
- Kingdom: Animalia
- Phylum: Arthropoda
- Clade: Pancrustacea
- Class: Insecta
- Order: Hymenoptera
- Family: Melittidae
- Subfamily: Melittinae
- Genus: Melitta; Kirby, 1802

Species
- ~50 species (see text)

= Melitta (bee) =

Genus of bees

Melitta is a genus of bees in the family Melittidae. It includes about 40 species restricted to Africa and the northern temperate zone. Most Melitta species are Palaearctic, although three rare species occur in North America.

Melitta are bees of moderate size, generally 8 to 15 mm long. They are commonly oligolectic, with narrow host plant preferences. They resemble bees of the genus Andrena, though with radically different mouthparts and a scopa limited to the hind tibia and basitarsus. Melitta have a crucial role as pollinators, and are protected through the Pollinators policy included in the EU Biodiversity Strategy.

== Species ==
- Melitta aegyptiaca (Radoszkowski, 1891)
- Melitta albida Cockerell, 1935
- Melitta americana (Smith, 1853)
- Melitta arrogans (Smith, 1879)
- Melitta avontuurensis Michez & Kuhlmann, 2014
- Melitta barbarae Eardley, 2006
- Melitta bicollaris Warncke, 1973
- Melitta budashkini Radchenko & Ivanov, 2012
- Melitta budensis (Mocsáry, 1878)
- Melitta californica Viereck, 1909
- Melitta cameroni (Cockerell, 1910)
- Melitta changmuensis Wu, 1988
- Melitta danae Eardley, 2006
- Melitta dimidiata Morawitz, 1876
- Melitta eickworti Snelling & Stage, 1995
- Melitta engeli Michez, 2012
- Melitta ezoana Yasumatsu & Hirashima, 1956
- Melitta fulvescenta Wu, 2000
- Melitta guichardi Michez, 2007
- Melitta haemorrhoidalis (Fabricius, 1775)
- Melitta harrietae (Bingham, 1897)
- Melitta heilungkiangensis Wu, 1978
- Melitta hispanica Friese 1900
- Melitta iberica Warncke, 1973
- Melitta japonica Yasumatsu & Hirashima, 1956
- Melitta kastiliensis Warncke, 1973
- Melitta katherinae Eardley, 2006
- Melitta latronis Cockerell, 1924
- Melitta leporina (Panzer, 1799)
- Melitta magnifica Michez, 2012
- Melitta maura (Pérez, 1896)
- Melitta melanura (Nylander, 1852)
- Melitta melittoides (Viereck, 1909)
- Melitta mongolica Wu, 1978
- Melitta montana Wu, 1992
- Melitta murciana Warncke, 1973
- Melitta nigrabdominalis Wu, 1988
- Melitta nigricans Alfken, 1905
- Melitta piersbakeri Engel, 2005
- Melitta rasmonti Michez, 2007
- Melitta richtersveldensis Michez & Kuhlmann, 2014
- Melitta schmiedeknechti Friese, 1898
- Melitta schultzei Friese, 1909
- Melitta seitzi Alfken 1927
- Melitta sibirica (Morawitz, 1888)
- Melitta singular Michez, 2012
- Melitta tomentosa Friese, 1900
- Melitta tricincta Kirby, 1802
- Melitta udmurtica Sitdikov 1986
- Melitta whiteheadi Eardley, 2006

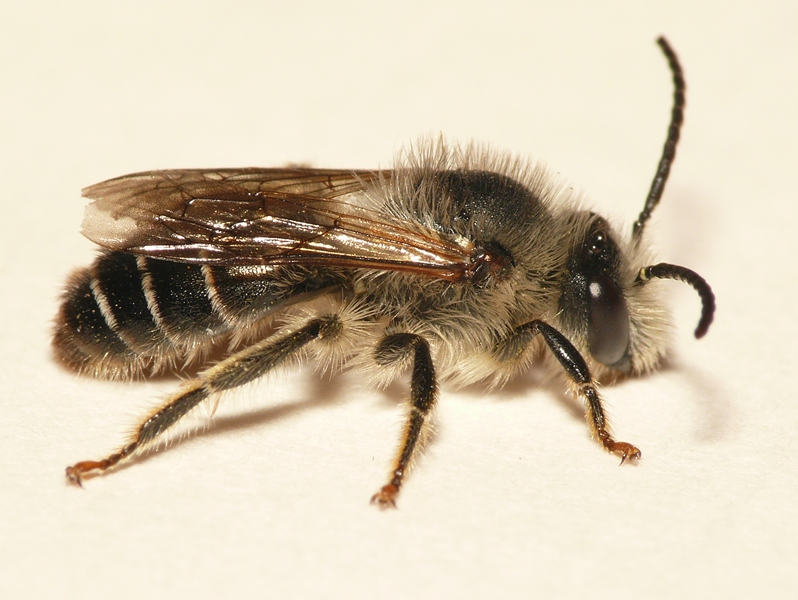
Melitta leporina, male

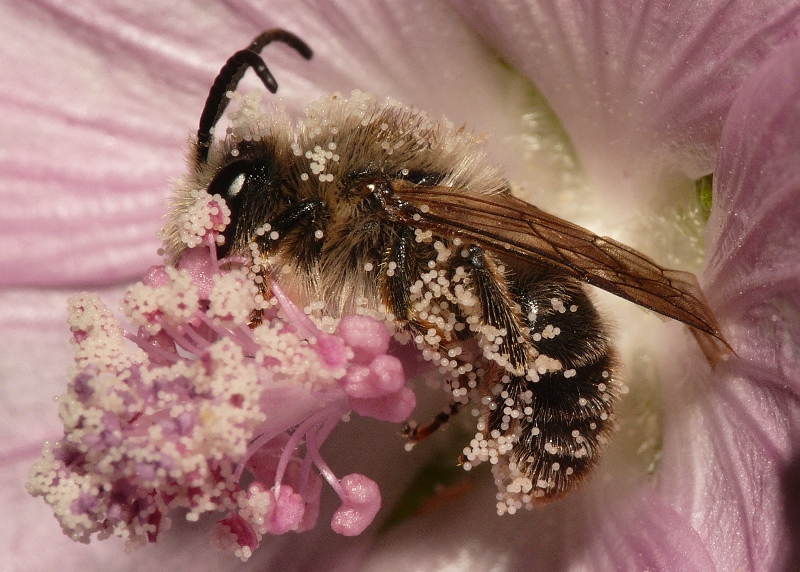
Melitta haemorrhoidalis, male

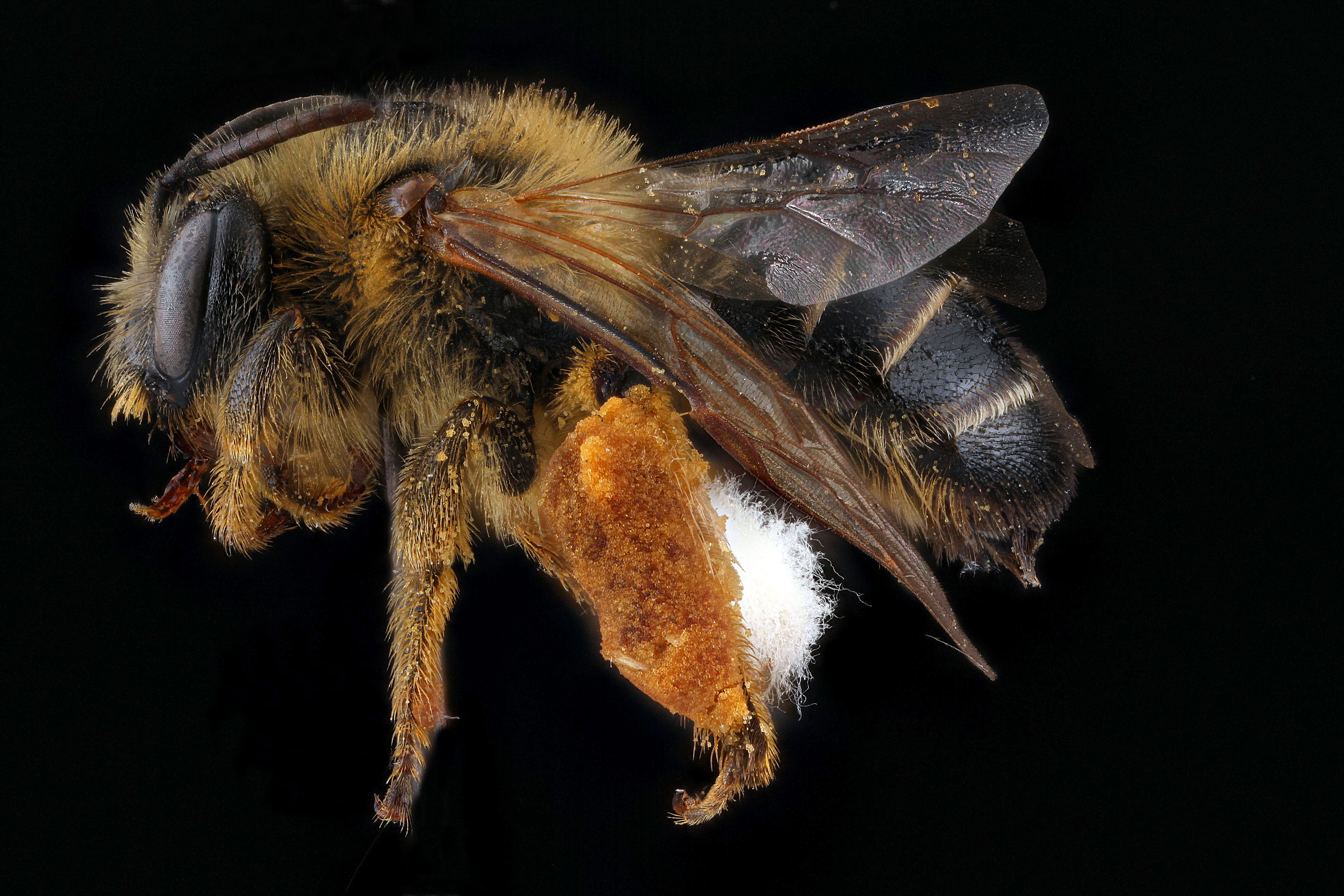
Melitta eickworti, female
