= Melitta melanura =

Scientific classification
- Kingdom: Animalia
- Phylum: Arthropoda
- Clade: Pancrustacea
- Class: Insecta
- Order: Hymenoptera
- Family: Melittidae
- Genus: Melitta
- Species: M. melanura

Binomial name
- Melitta melanura (Nylander, 1852)

Synonyms
- Kirbya melanura Nylander, 1852; Melitta wankowiczi (Radoszkowski, 1891)

Species of bee

Melitta melanura is a species of Melitta.

The species was described in 1852 by Nylander as Kirbya melanura.

It is found in Eurasia.
