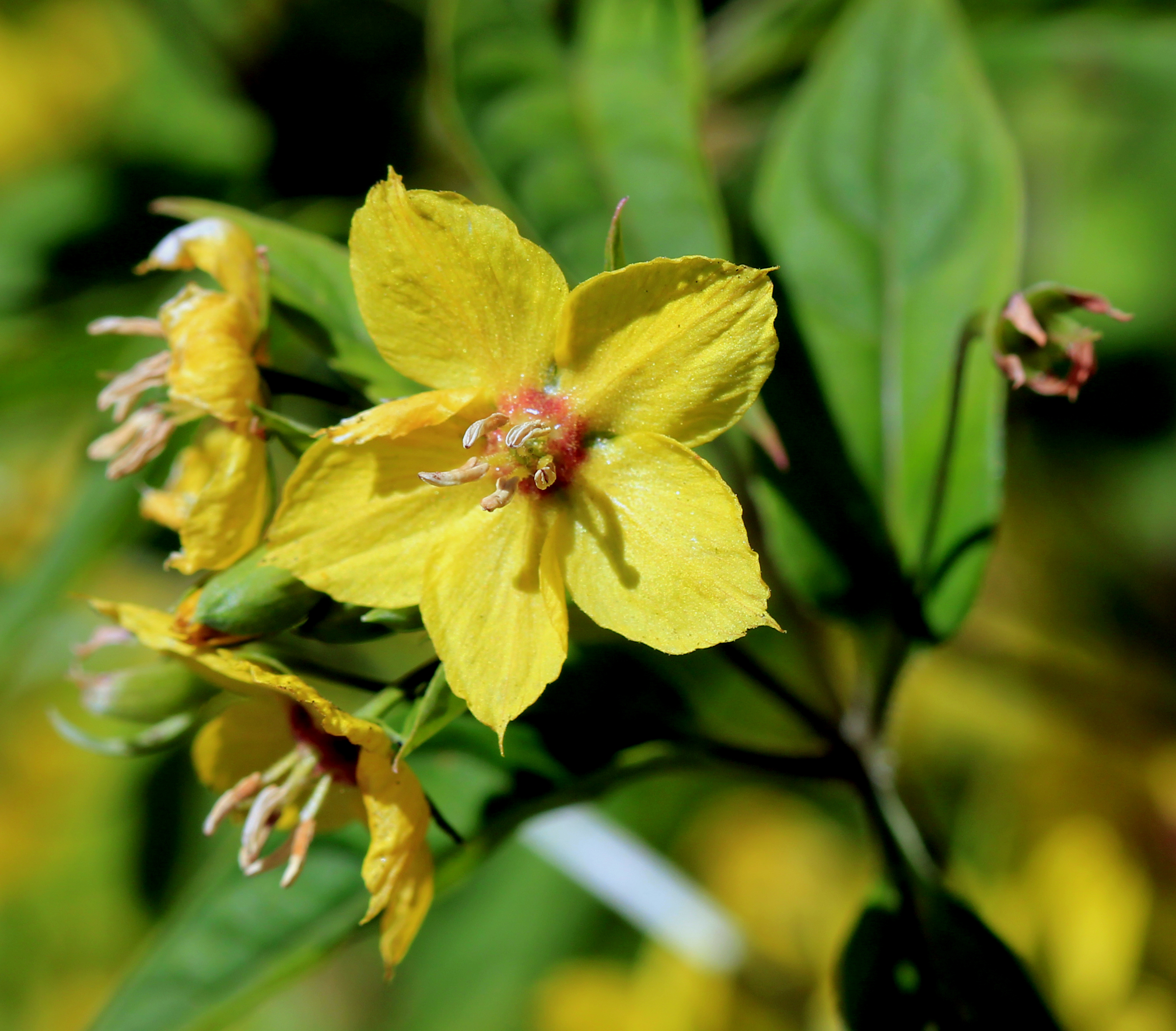
- Flower

Scientific classification
- Kingdom: Plantae
- Clade: Tracheophytes
- Clade: Angiosperms
- Clade: Eudicots
- Clade: Asterids
- Order: Ericales
- Family: Primulaceae
- Genus: Lysimachia
- Species: L. ciliata

Binomial name
- Lysimachia ciliata L.

Synonyms
- Steironema ciliatum Steironema pumilum

= Lysimachia ciliata =

Fringed loosestrife

Species of flowering plant

Lysimachia ciliata, the fringed loosestrife, is a species of flowering plant in the family Primulaceae. It is an erect herbaceous perennial growing to 120 cm (47 in) tall and 60 cm (24 in) broad, with opposite, simple leaves, and smooth green stems. The star-shaped yellow flowers are borne in midsummer. It is native to North America, including most of southern Canada and most of the United States except for the southwest. This plant is notable in that it is one of the few species of Lysimachia to bear elaiophores, that is, to offer oil instead of nectar as a reward to pollinators. It is pollinated in the northern part of its range by the specialist oil bee Macropis nuda, a native bee species whose survival depends upon this host plant.

It is also cultivated as an ornamental plant. It can be aggressive, but new suckers can be removed easily to keep plant size under control. The most common cultivars of L. ciliata include:

- L. ciliata 'Firecracker'
- L. ciliata 'Purpurea'

'Firecracker' has gained the Royal Horticultural Society's Award of Garden Merit.
