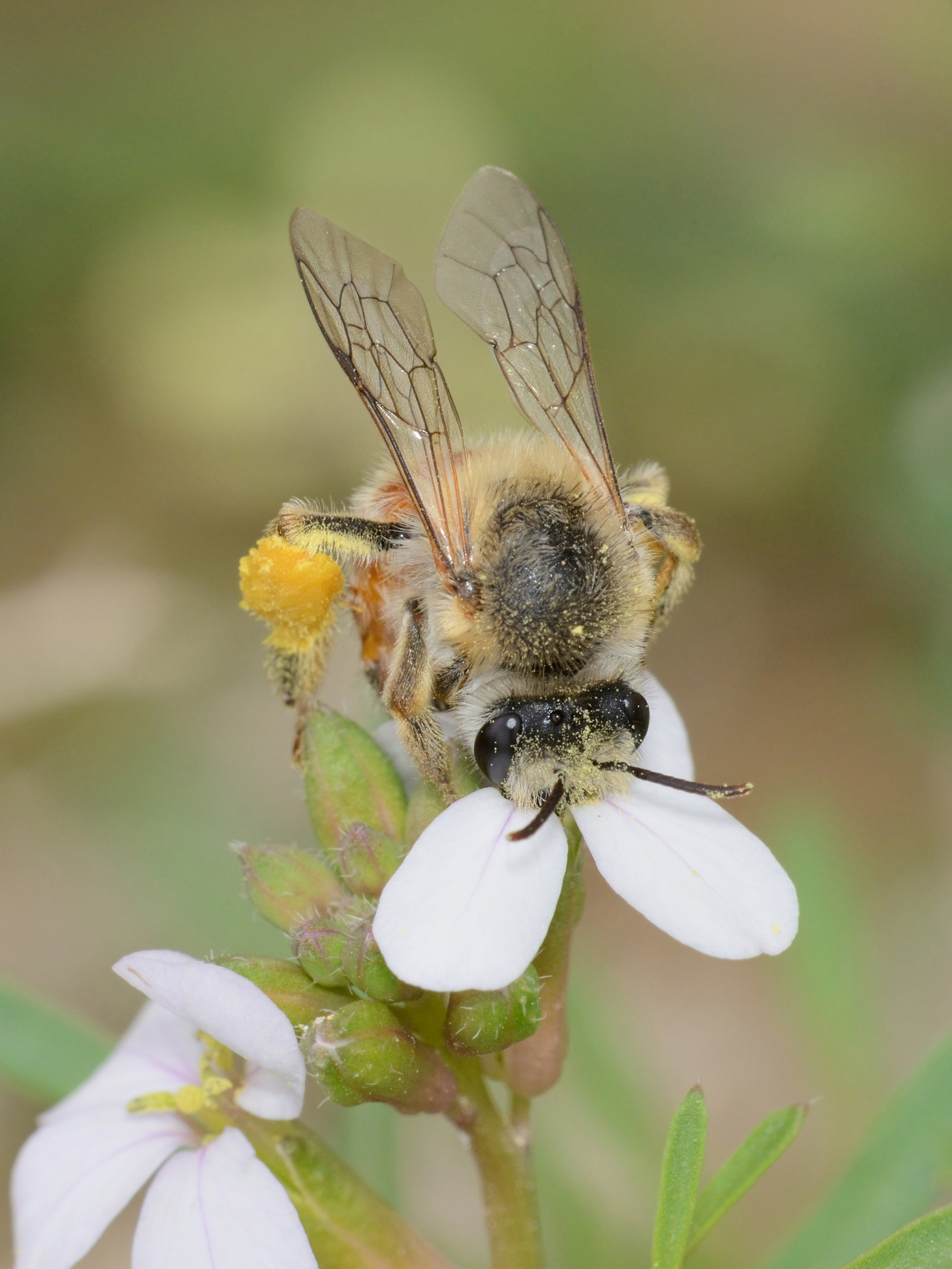
- Melitta maura, female

Scientific classification
- Kingdom: Animalia
- Phylum: Arthropoda
- Clade: Pancrustacea
- Class: Insecta
- Order: Hymenoptera
- Family: Melittidae
- Subfamily: Melittinae

Genera
- Macropis; Melitta; Rediviva; Redivivoides

= Melittinae =

Subfamily of bees

Melittinae is a small melittid subfamily, with some 60 species in four genera, restricted to Africa and the northern temperate zone. They are typically small to moderate-sized bees, which often have shaggy scopae, and are commonly oligolectic; several species further specialize on floral oils as larval food rather than pollen, including Rediviva emdeorum, a highly unusual species in which the forelegs are longer than the entire body, and used to sponge up the floral oil at the end of elongated corolla spurs of the host plant, Diascia.

The Melittinae are known from a fossil of Palaeomacropis eocenicus in the Early Eocene of Oise, France.
