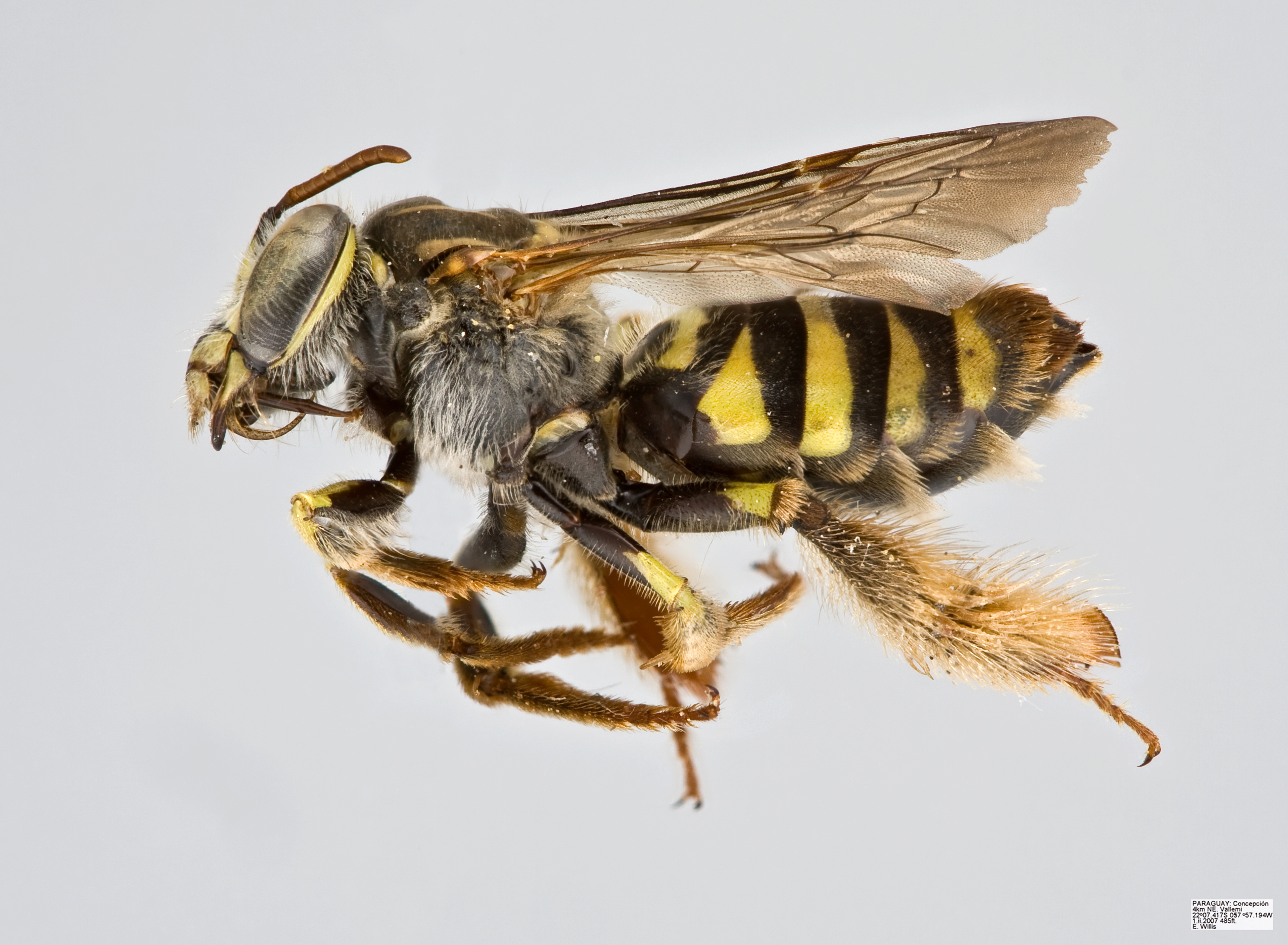
- Caenonomada unicalcarata (female)

Scientific classification
- Kingdom: Animalia
- Phylum: Arthropoda
- Clade: Pancrustacea
- Class: Insecta
- Order: Hymenoptera
- Family: Apidae
- Subfamily: Apinae
- Tribe: Tapinotaspidini; Roig-Alsina & Michener, 1993

= Tapinotaspidini =

Tribe of bees

The Tapinotaspidini are a tribe of apid bees. They belong to the order Hymenoptera and the family Apidae. The Tapinotaspidini tribe consists of 180 different species. Many species of Apidae are recognised as oil-collecting bees and Tapinotaspidini possess this oil-collecting behaviour. It is maintained that mutualism exists between oil secreting flowers and oil collecting Tapinotaspidini bees. Morphological and molecular phylogenies have found that the trait of oil-collecting is polyphyletic. Tapinotaspidini are solitary bees which collect oil sources from flowers belonging to the families of Malpighiaceae, Solanaceae, Orchidaceae, Calceolariaceae, Iridaceae, Plantaginaceae, Melastomataceae and Krameriaceae. Tapinotaspidini species differ in terms of being generalist and specialist oil-collectors. Selected species exclusively obtain floral oil from one family of flowering plants, whilst many Tapinotaspidini species employ a range of plant families to fulfil their oil-collecting behaviour.

== Geographical origin ==
Tapinotaspidini bees evolved during the Paleocene within a savanna environment resembling the Cerrado with broad grasslands of South America. The ancestral floral host of Tapinotaspidini is deemed to be the flowering plant family of Malpighiaceae which arose 60 million years ago and is regarded as the oldest oil producing plant. Tapinotaspidini began to occupy forested terrain approximately 30 million years ago. The introduction and interaction with other oil producing plants occurred throughout the Eocene and Miocene eras. This diversification was significant in facilitating an array of habitats for Tapinotaspidini.

== Morphology ==
Tapinotaspidini possess adapted morphological features which aid its ability to collect oil from flowers. For both male and female oil-collecting bees, this includes the presence of plumose, combs and setae hairs on the sternum and covering the front and middle pairs of legs. Tapinotaspidini bees generally exhibit a body length of approximately 6mm as observed in the genera of Arhysoceble, Lophopedia and Chalepogenus.

== Distribution and habitat ==
Tapinotaspidini bees are geographically distributed across Neotropical region, spanning from northern Argentina, encompassing central Mexico and the Caribbean. Tapinotaspidini are ground-nesting bees, whereby the brood cells are constructed by embedding the structure into soil matter. Males pertaining to the Tapinotaspidini species of Arhysoceble picta reside on the exterior of the flower species Cuphea glutinosa, establishing aggregations over the night period while they sleep. This is feasible for the species of Arhysoceble picta belonging to the Tapinotaspidini tribe, as their integument colouring is comparable to the calyx of the Cuphea glutinosa flower which inhibits them from being predated upon. It is denoted that male Tapinotaspidini species of Chalepogenus muelleri, Lanthanomelissa clementis and Lanthanomelissa discrepans typically sleep on the interior of the flowers which undergo nyctinasty, whereby the petals of the flower close at night. This protects the bees from external weather forces, including rain and wind and maintain a warm temperature via respiratory metabolism.

== Pollination ==
Tapinotaspidini females are the predominant performers of pollination compared to males. Tapinotaspidini females are identified as oligolectic pollinators to differing species of the genus Sisyrinchium. When Tapinotaspidini have access to plant species of Cuphea glutinosa (Lythraceae), Calibrachoa ovalifolia (Solanaceae), Sisyrichium micranthum, Sisyrichium scariosum, Sisyrichium osteneanum (Iridaceae) and Nothoscordum gracile (Amaryllidaceae), the females of the bee species Lanthanomelissa discrepans belonging to the Tapinotaspidini tribe have been found to interact with Sisyrinchium scariosum for the longest duration of time. Tapinotaspidini males may engage in physical contact with pollen when they choose a flower to sleep in over night. There is controversy in regards to potential pollination by male Tapinotaspidini. Throughout the diurnal period, Arhysoceble picta (Tapinotaspidini) are considered to consume nectar from flowers in which the transfer of pollen could possibly occur. Male Tapinotaspidini species which sleep inside flowers may be deemed as potential pollinators as grains of pollen that adhered to the individual's body over the night period may be transported, delivering it to a different flower when visiting it the following day. Pollen may also be acquired by males when in contact with a flower, anticipating a mating event.

The flowering plant family Plantaginaceae includes the Angelonia clade. The genera of Caenonomada, Paratetrapedia and Arhysoceble within the Tapinotaspidini tribe have been found to pollinate Angelonia flowers. Angelonia plants have corolla tubes which differ in length whereby some have short length corolla tubes and long lobes and other species have long corolla tubes and short lobes thus, require different methods of pollination. For example, the plant species of A. goyazensis exhibits short tubes and long lobes. It undergoes pollination by the bee species Paratetrapedia punctata within the Tapinotaspidini tribe. The scutellum on the thorax of the bee and the mesoscutum reaches physical contact with the fertile organs of the plant. Due to how the reproductive organs are situated on the flower, pollen adheres to the bee and facilitates pollination by transporting it to other flowers. In comparison, if the flower has deep corolla tubes and short lobes, this requires the bee to insert its entire body into the flower to pick up pollen.

Plant-pollinator specialisation is present between the flower species of Angelonia cornigera and the species of Tapinotaspis nordestina within the Tapinotaspidini tribe. They exhibit the morphological feature of a pair of long legs which extend beyond the other limbs. This biological adaption facilitates oil-collection as the bee is able to retrieve the oil from the oil sacs which are located deep within the flower. However, this adaption is considered to be species specific as it has been denoted that this morphological trait is absent in the genus of Caenonomada yet they also pollinate Angelonia cornigera.

== Use of floral oil ==
The floral oils are obtained from elaiophores which are the glands in flowers which produce oil. Tapinotaspidini females coat their nest cell wall in floral oils. Females additionally combine the floral oils with pollen as a food source for their larvae. Thus, Tapinotaspidini benefit from the floral oils and support pollination in plants via the transfer of pollen grains. This gives rise to a mutualistic relationship. Moreover, it is recognised that Tapinotaspidini males partake in floral oil-collecting but the rationale behind this is uncertain.

== Genera ==
- Arhysoceble
- Caenonomada
- Chalepogenus
- Monoeca
- Paratetrapedia
- Tapinotaspis
- Tapinotaspoides
- Trigonopedia
