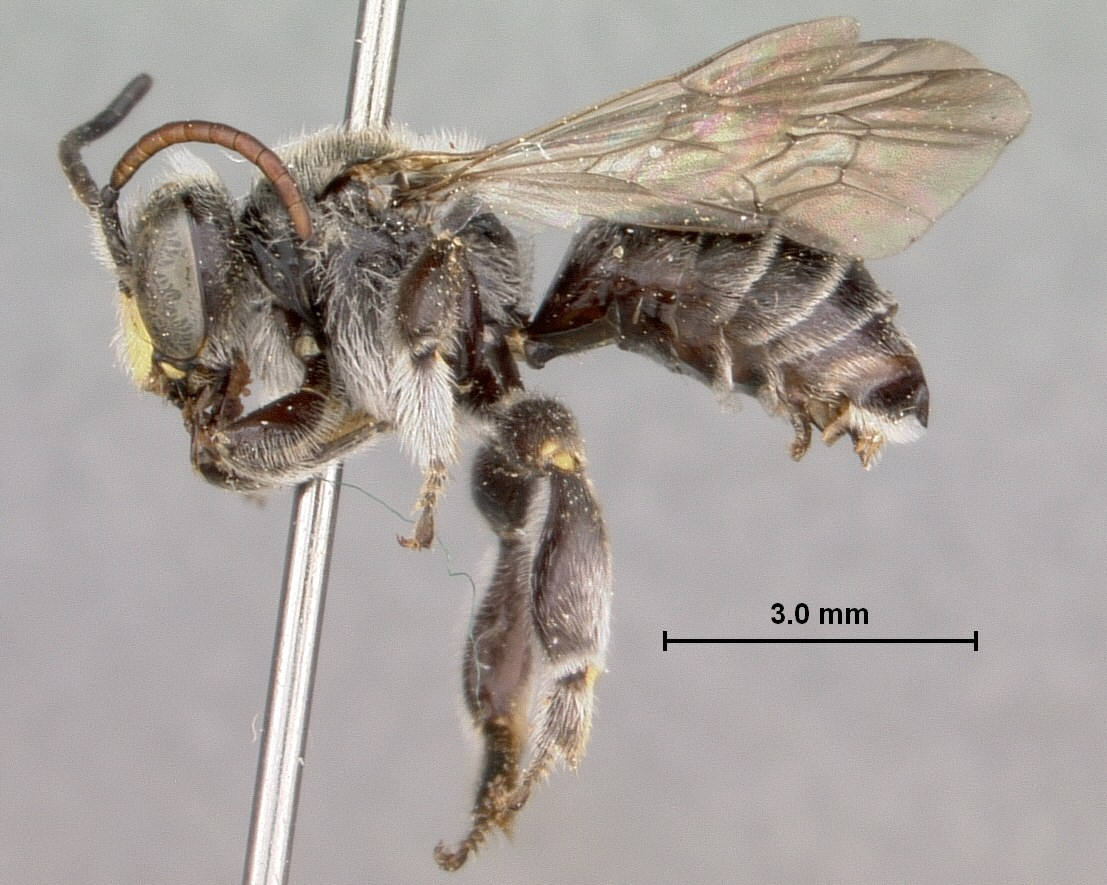
- Macropis sp.

Scientific classification
- Kingdom: Animalia
- Phylum: Arthropoda
- Class: Insecta
- Order: Hymenoptera
- Family: Melittidae
- Subfamily: Melittinae
- Genus: Macropis; Panzer, 1809

Species
- See text

= Macropis =

Genus of bees

Macropis is a genus of bees in the family Melittidae. They are very rare and were likely more common in the past. They are associated with yellow loosestrife plants in the genus Lysimachia.

== Description ==
Macropis species are of moderate size, not exceeding 15 mm. They have a livery predominantly black; males are characterized by conspicuous yellow markings on the head, but the females show morphological adaptations related to their foraging habits of flower oils, posterior tibiae with very developed, covered with a dense velvety hairs. Unlike most Melittidae, the wing has only two submarginal cells.

== Biology ==
They are solitary bees that dig their nests in the ground. Most species are oligolectic and feed on pollen and floral oils of Lysimachia spp. They make a single generation per year. The males emerge from the ground in spring, just before the females, and await the females in the vicinity of the flowers of the host plant. After mating, the females dig a nest in the ground, ending with one or two rooms in which is collected the pollen, which is placed on the egg. The larvae, feeding on the pollen, develop rapidly, and within 10 days turn into pupae, spending the winter in this stage. Macropis nests are often parasitized by bee cleptoparasites such as Epeoloides.

== Species ==
- Macropis ciliata Patton, 1880
- Macropis dimidiata Yasumatsu & Hirashima, 1956
- Macropis europaea Warncke, 1973
- Macropis frivaldszkyi Mocsáry, 1878
- Macropis fulvipes (Fabricius, 1804)
- Macropis hedini Alfken 1936
- Macropis immaculata Wu 1965
- Macropis kiangsuensis Wu, 1978
- Macropis micheneri Wu, 1992
- Macropis nuda (Provancher, 1882)
- Macropis omeiensis Wu, 1965
- Macropis orientalis Michez & Patiny, 2005
- Macropis patellata Patton, 1880
- Macropis steironematis Robertson, 1891
- Macropis tibialis Yasumatsu & Hirashima, 1956
- Macropis ussuriana (Popov, 1936)
