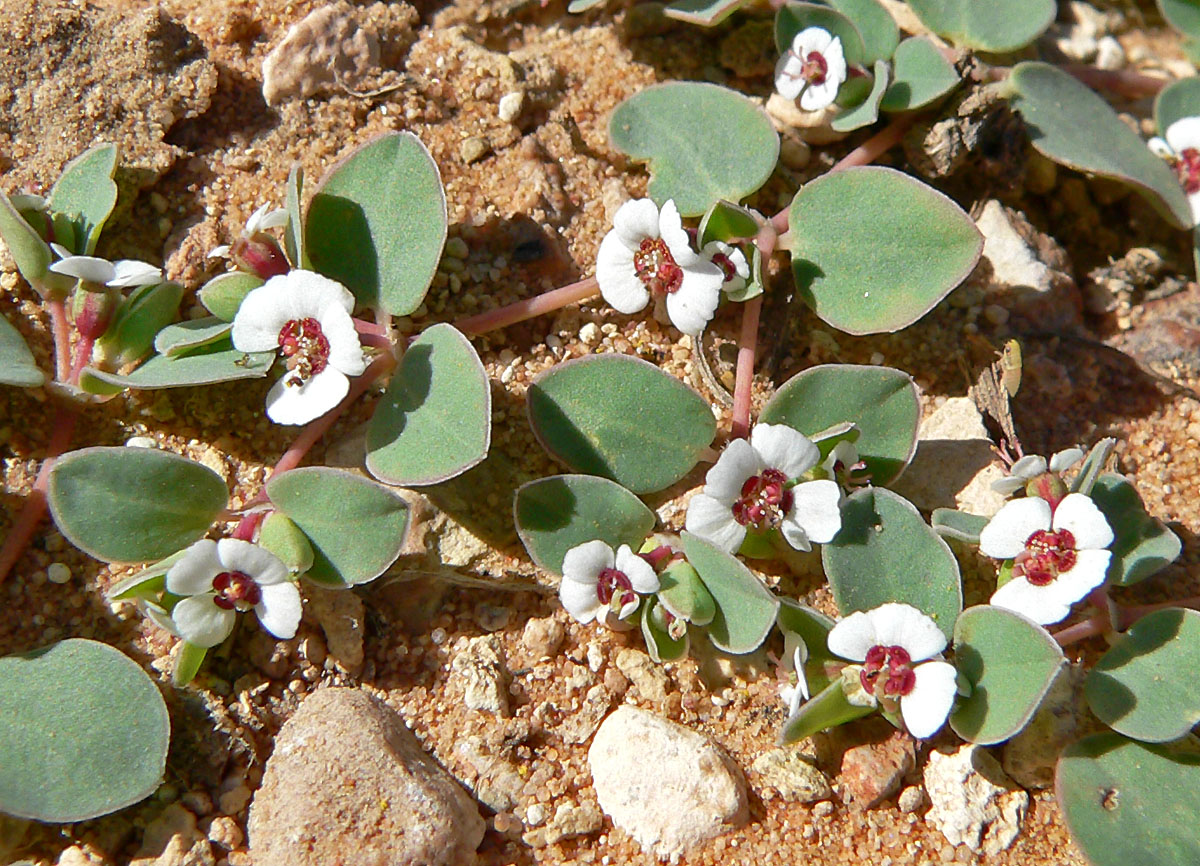

Conservation status
- Secure (NatureServe)

Scientific classification
- Kingdom: Plantae
- Clade: Tracheophytes
- Clade: Angiosperms
- Clade: Eudicots
- Clade: Rosids
- Order: Malpighiales
- Family: Euphorbiaceae
- Genus: Euphorbia
- Species: E. albomarginata

Binomial name
- Euphorbia albomarginata Torr. & A.Gray

Synonyms
- Chamaesyce albomarginata (Torr. & A.Gray) Small; Chamaesyce hartwegiana (Boiss.) Small; Euphorbia hartwegiana Boiss.; Euphorbia stipulacea Engelm. ex Boiss. nom. illeg.

= Euphorbia albomarginata =

Species of flowering plant in the spurge family

Euphorbia albomarginata (formerly Chamaesyce albomarginata), whitemargin sandmat or rattlesnake weed, is a small low-growing perennial, in the spurge family (Euphorbia, Euphorbiaceae) native to desert, chaparral, and grassland habitats of southwestern North America, from southern and central California to Northern Mexico and Louisiana.

It can be easily identified by its small size, dusty green leaves, very flattened growth pattern, and the white circular margin around the edge of its burgundy centered flowers. It is one of four members of the former Chamaesyce genus that are native to the Santa Monica Mountains, in addition to three species that have been introduced there, most of which share to some degree or other the white margin on the flower. As with other typical members of the Euphorbia family, it has a white milky sap, and is poisonous. It is one of only 11 members of the Euphorbia native to California, and one of four native to the Santa Monica Mountains.

== Description ==
Euphorbia albomarginata is a common ground cover plant, usually growing less than 1/2 in (13 mm) high, with individual plants covering about a square foot, often growing closely and forming mats of vegetation. The flowers of this plant are tiny and edged in white, with a purplish center. It can be found in open fields, on roadsides, or anywhere where the ground is disturbed, including ornamental gravels in suburban yards, where it is considered as a weed.

The former genus name Chamaesyce comes from the Greek word "chame", meaning "on the ground", and "syce" meaning "fig". This refers to the growth pattern of being flattened in all aspects, as if a box had been placed on it, so as to be lying very close to the ground. One of the defining chaparral plants, Chamise (Adenostoma fasciculatum), derives from the same word.

The flower has a circular burgundy center with a white ring around it. The epithet "albomarginata" (white-margined) refers to the "white" ringed "margin" of the flower "petals". The plant actually has no petals, but has modified leaves called "bracts", more round that the green leaves on the rest of the plant, which form a cuplike shape. The 12–30 male flowers are difficult to see, consisting only of one stamen each, and are clustered in the center of the cup. The single female flower is at the center, with an elevated ovary pendant on a long stalk, which when fertilized and mature, bears a capsule fruit, and so the name "syce" ("fig").

The leaves are round to heart shaped with the point of the heart away (ovoid) from the small stem attaching the leaf to the branch (petiole). The "nonflower leaves" are a peculiar "dusty green", with green but sometimes with burgundyish edges, and burgundyish stems, similar in color to the flower center inside the white ring, and particularly so after a late Spring or Summer rain.

== Uses ==
The plant was formerly used as a folk remedy for snakebites (as a poultice or brewed as a tea) – hence the common name "rattlesnake weed". However, this species is not proven to be medically effective in treating rattlesnake venom. Like most spurges, rattlesnake weed secretes an acrid, milky sap containing alkaloids poisonous to humans, with emetic and cathartic properties that may be misconstrued as curative.

Among the Zuni people, the leaves and roots are eaten to promote lactation.

== Other names ==
- Rattlesnake weed
- Whitemargin sandmat
- Golondrina (Spanish – "swallow" (the bird))
- Yerba de la vibora (Spanish – "viper grass")

== Additional references ==
- Blanchan, Neltje (2002). Wild Flowers: An Aid to Knowledge of our Wild Flowers and their Insect Visitors. Project Gutenberg Literary Archive Foundation.
- Blanchan, Neltje (2005). Wild Flowers Worth Knowing. Project Gutenberg Literary Archive Foundation.
