= Blue pimpernel =

Blue pimpernel is a common name for several plants and may refer to:

- Anagallis foemina
- Lysimachia monelli
