= John Turner Sargent Sr. =

John Turner Sargent Sr. (June 26, 1924 – February 5, 2012) was president and CEO of the Doubleday and Company publishing house from 1963 to 1978, taking over from the previous president, Douglas Black. He led the expansion of the company from "a modest, family-controlled business to an industry giant with interests extending into broadcasting and baseball." A socialite, he was active in New York's cultural circles.

== Early life and education ==
John Turner Sargent was born probably on Long Island, New York and was raised in Cedarhurst. He was the son of Charles S. Sargent and his wife. His paternal grandfather was botanist Charles Sprague Sargent, the first director of the Arnold Arboretum at Harvard University.

His father became successful in finance as a partner in Hornblower & Weeks, a securities concern in New York. The young Sargent attended the private St. Mark's School and a year at Harvard College before enlisting in the Navy during World War II.

== Marriage and family ==
In May 1953 Sargent married Neltje Doubleday, who was 18. She was the granddaughter of the late Frank N. Doubleday, who founded the Doubleday publishing company in 1897. The couple had a daughter Ellen and son John Turner Sargent Jr.

After they divorced in 1965, Neltje Doubleday Sargent moved with their children to Wyoming. She remarried, bought a ranch, restored and operated the historic Sheridan Inn, and established herself as an abstract painter. In 2005 she received one of the annual Wyoming Governor's Art Awards.

Sargent remarried on December 21, 1985, to Elizabeth Nichols Kelly, the fiction and books editor of Cosmopolitan magazine. She brought her two children to the marriage.

== Career ==
After the war, Sargent started working at Doubleday as a copywriter. He soon advanced to higher positions and had been there for years before his marriage to Neltje. He made his career in book publishing at Doubleday and Company, which he led through a major expansion and diversification. He ranged from editing the poetry of Theodore Roethke to publishing bestsellers by Stephen King and others; in the 1970s, he recruited Jackie Kennedy Onassis as an editor.

In 1963 he became president and CEO of the Doubleday and Company publishing house. In the summer of 1972 his former wife Neltje Doubleday Kings led a shareholder effort to take the company public, but it was defeated. Her mother and brother supported Sargent in keeping the company privately held.

While Sargent served as president and CEO until 1978, he led the company through a major expansion, expanding its publishing and diversifying its businesses. As reported by Bruce Weber,

By 1979, the year after he left the presidency and was made chairman, Doubleday was publishing 700 books annually. The company had bought a textbook subsidiary and the Dell Publishing Company, which included Dell paperbacks. It was operating more than a dozen book clubs, including the mammoth Literary Guild; more than two dozen Doubleday bookshops across the country; and four book printing and binding companies.

Sargent also led the company's expansion into "radio and television broadcasting and film production."

In 1978 Sargent became chairman of the company, serving until 1985. Working in partnership with Nelson Doubleday Jr., Sargent supported purchase of the New York Mets. When Doubleday was sold to Bertelsmann during the Mets championship season of 1986, he became chairman of the executive committee at Doubleday.

Sargent was active in supporting literary and cultural institutions in the city. Deeply involved in its social life, he was described as a socialite and for years hosted a Christmas Eve party strictly for single people.

== Community service ==
Sargent was a trustee of the New York Public Library, the New York Zoological Society and the American Academy in Rome.

He died in 2012, aged 87, after recent years of frail health following a stroke. He was survived by, among others, his wife Elizabeth, two children and grandchildren, and two stepchildren.

== Legacy and honors ==
In 2005, the John Sargent Sr. First Novel Prize literary prize was established in his honor at the Center for Fiction at the New York Mercantile Library.

The award has been increased to $10,000; with $1,000 each for finalists on the shortlist. As of 2012, it is funded by Nancy Dunnan, a board member at the Center and non-fiction author. She has named it also for her father Ray Flaherty, a journalist with the Chicago Tribune. It is now called the Flaherty-Dunnan First Novel Prize.

== Sources ==
- "Book View - People, Duly Noted", Publishing Trends (April 2006)
