= John Turner Sargent =

American businessman

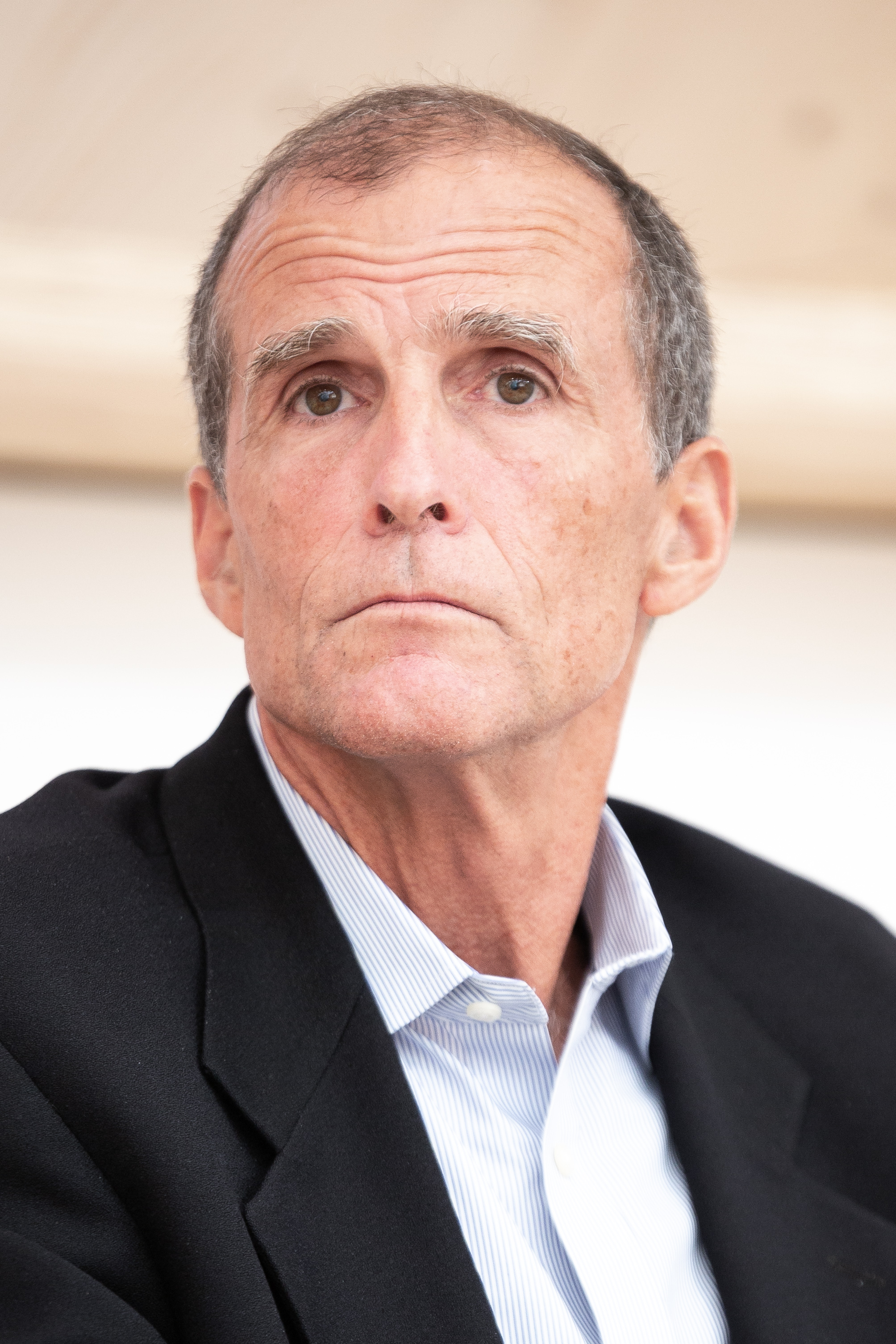
Turner Sargent at the Frankfurt Book Fair 2018

John Turner Sargent Jr. (born August 1957) is an American book publisher; he was the CEO of Macmillan Publishers USA, and was the executive vice president of the Georg von Holtzbrinck Publishing Group, where he oversaw the global trade operations in the U.S., U.K., Germany, and Australia as well as Macmillan Learning, the company's US-based higher education business.

== Early life and education ==
John Turner Sargent Jr. was born in New York City to Neltje Doubleday and John Turner Sargent Sr. His mother's paternal grandfather Frank Nelson Doubleday was the founder of Doubleday and Company. Sargent and his sister Ellen lived in Wyoming with their mother after their parents' divorce in 1965. After graduating from Stanford University with a B.A. in economics, Sargent Jr. earned an M.B.A. at Columbia University.

== Career ==
Throughout his career, he worked in many aspects of the publishing business.

After business school, he started working at Doubleday, and by 1985 was working as a business associate in the publishing division of Doubleday & Company. Sargent has also served as VP, Finance and Administration for Checkerboard Press, an imprint of Macmillan Co.; president of the Children's Book Division of Simon & Schuster; and CEO of Dorling Kindersley, Inc.

Beginning at Holtzbrinck in 1996 as CEO of St. Martin's Press, he later oversaw the US operations of the publishing group, including all the US trade companies, the Macmillan Higher Education group, St. Martin's Scholarly and Reference, Hanley & Belfus Medical Publishers, and Scientific American. Sargent is now the CEO of Macmillan and responsible for Macmillan higher education business as well as managing the global trade business. In 2015, he was promoted to executive vice president of Holtzbrinck Publishing Group. He also serves on the executive board of the Association of American Publishers as the vice chair.

Sargent is known for his role in Macmillan's disagreement with Amazon over agency pricing in 2010 and when the Department of Justice filed a suit against Macmillan in 2013, United States v. Apple Inc. Additionally, he negotiated on behalf of the AAP in the Google Books settlement in 2008, and published Macmillan's response to President Donald Trump's cease and desist attempt to block publication of Michael Wolff's Fire and Fury.

== Awards and honors ==
In 2000, the LMP Awards named John Sargent Person of the Year.

In 2012, the New Atlantic Independent Booksellers Association awarded Sargent with their annual Legacy Award in recognition of Sargent's "consistent willingness to battle Amazon and … his stance regarding e-book pricing and the DOJ."

In 2017, PEN America, a literary nonprofit dedicated to human rights and freedom of expression, honored Sargent at their annual literary gala for his commitment to the protection of publishers, authors, and intellectual property rights throughout his lifelong career in publishing.

== Community ==
Sargent serves on the board of Ocean Conservancy, a nonprofit based in Washington, D.C., that formulates sustainable environmental policy at federal and state levels to protect oceanic preservation.

Sargent is a longtime member of the board of directors of Graham Windham, a non-profit group providing aid to children and families in New York City since 1806. It is the oldest non-sectarian childcare agency in the United States. He is a former chairman of the board.

== Personal life ==
On September 21, 1985, Sargent married Constance Lane Murray. They met as graduate business students at Columbia University. They have two children and live in Brooklyn, NY.

== Controversy ==
Macmillan Publishers' decision to effectively put a two-month embargo on electronic copies of its new books at libraries, starting November 1. The publishing firm will allow library systems to have only a single electronic copy of a new book upon its release, despite the fact that a library system can cover a major metropolitan area.

When Macmillan announced the move in July, the company's CEO, John Sargent, argued that library readers were "cannibalizing our digital sales" and that a remedy to the rising use of electronic books in libraries was necessary.

"It seems that given a choice between a purchase of an e-book for $12.99 or a frictionless lend for free, the American e-book reader is starting to lean heavily toward free," he said in a letter to the company's authors, illustrators, and agents.

"Library reads are currently 45% of [Macmillan's] total digital book reads in the U.S. and growing," Macmillan Chief Executive John Sargent said in an interview with The Wall Street Journal. The article also noted that "[l]ibraries generate only 15% of Macmillan's total annual e-book revenue."

ALA has spoken against the move ever since, calling it "unacceptable," but the push to get the public interested in the issue is new and was announced this week at a major industry conference, Digital Book World. The association also launched a website titled e-books for All, which includes a petition aimed at Sargent, and it will include materials to place in libraries.

The website notes that Macmillan's policy harms readers with disabilities in particular. From the petition page:

This embargo would limit libraries' ability to provide access to information for all. It particularly harms library patrons with disabilities or learning issues. One of the great things about e-books is that they can become large-print books with only a few clicks, and most e-book readers offer fonts and line spacing that make reading easier for people who have dyslexia or other visual challenges. Because portable devices are light and easy to hold, e-books are easier to use for some people who have physical disabilities.

The Wall Street Journal noted that "The pricing model follows a similar distribution pattern as seen with movies, from the initial opening in theaters to DVD and video-on-demand, to pay-TV services like AT&T Inc.'s HBO or subscription services such as Netflix Inc. Sargent said publishers have long delayed the paperback editions of new titles in favor of generating more sales of higher-priced hardcovers."
