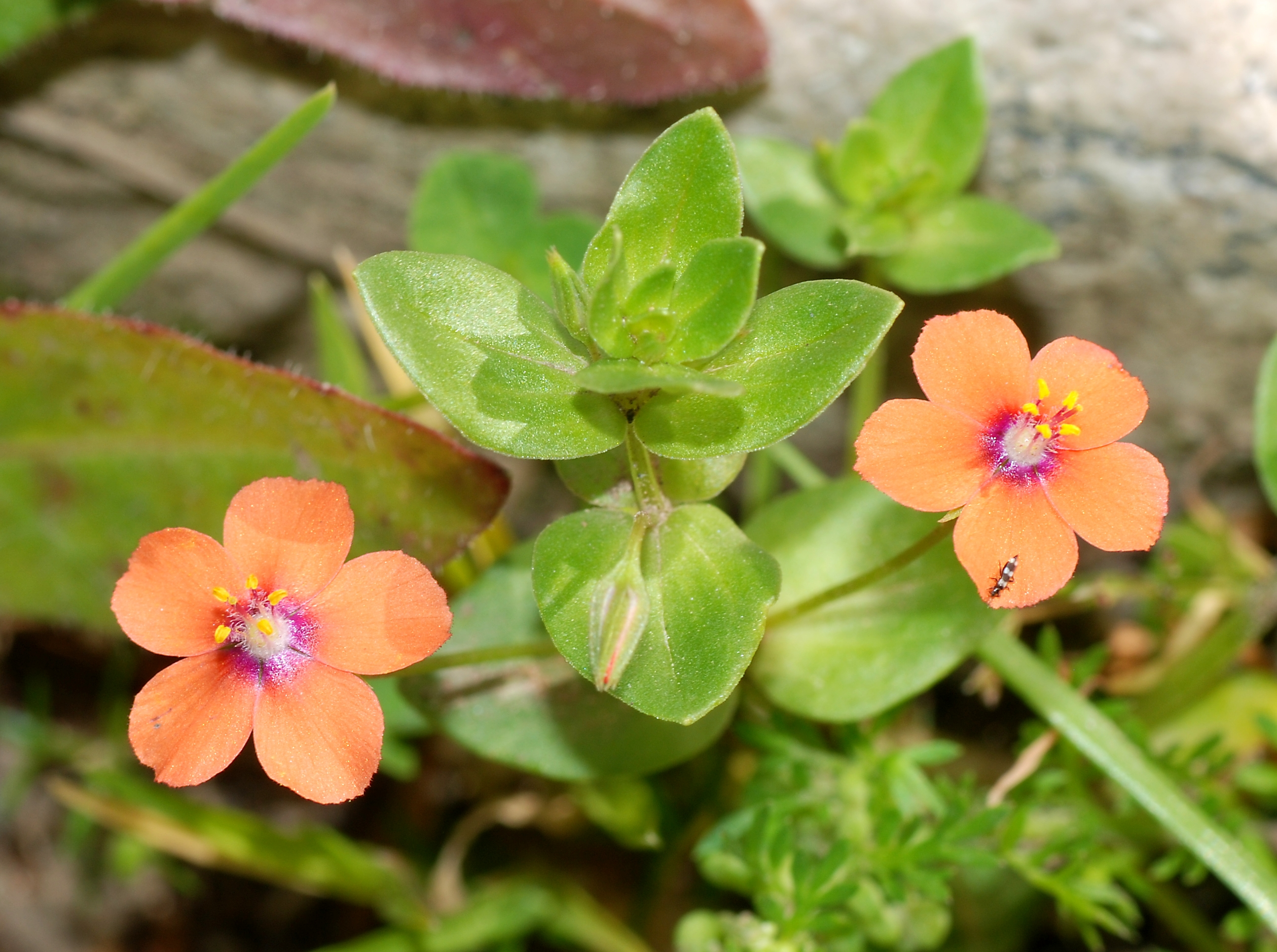

Scientific classification
- Kingdom: Plantae
- Clade: Tracheophytes
- Clade: Angiosperms
- Clade: Eudicots
- Clade: Asterids
- Order: Ericales
- Family: Primulaceae
- Genus: Lysimachia
- Species: L. arvensis

Binomial name
- Lysimachia arvensis (L.) U.Manns & Anderb.

Synonyms
- List: Anagallis arabica Duby; Anagallis arvensis L.; Anagallis arvensis subsp. phoenicea (Gouan) Vollm., not validly publ.; Anagallis arvensis decipiens Uechtr.; Anagallis arvensis var. carnea (Schrank) Boenn.; Anagallis arvensis var. immaculata Lej.; Anagallis arvensis var. lilacina Alef.; Anagallis arvensis var. pallida Hook.f.; Anagallis arvensis var. phoenicea Gouan, not validly publ.; Anagallis arvensis var. platyphylloides Pau; Anagallis arvensis var. purpurea Douie; Anagallis arvensis var. repens (DC.) Merino; Anagallis arvensis var. tridyma Klett & Richt.; Anagallis arvensis f. carnea (Schrank) Schinz & R.Keller; Anagallis arvensis f. decipiens (Uechtr.) Schinz & R.Keller; Anagallis arvensis f. lilacina (Alef.) Schinz & R.Keller; Anagallis arvensis f. pallida (Hook.f.) Hyl.; Anagallis arvensis f. purpurea (Douie) P.D.Sell; Anagallis carnea Schrank; Anagallis hadidii Chrtek & Osb.-Kos.; Anagallis indica Sweet; Anagallis jacquemontii Duby; Anagallis mas Vill.; Anagallis monelli M.Bieb., sensu auct.; Anagallis orientalis Fisch., C.A.Mey. & Avé-Lall.; Anagallis parviflora Loisel., nom. illeg.; Anagallis phoenicea Scop., nom. superfl.; Anagallis phoenicea var. verticillata Gray; Anagallis pulchella Salisb., nom. superfl.; Anagallis punctifolia Stokes; Anagallis repens DC.; Lysimachia arvensis var. arvensis

= Lysimachia arvensis =

Scarlet pimpernel

Species of flowering plant in the primrose family

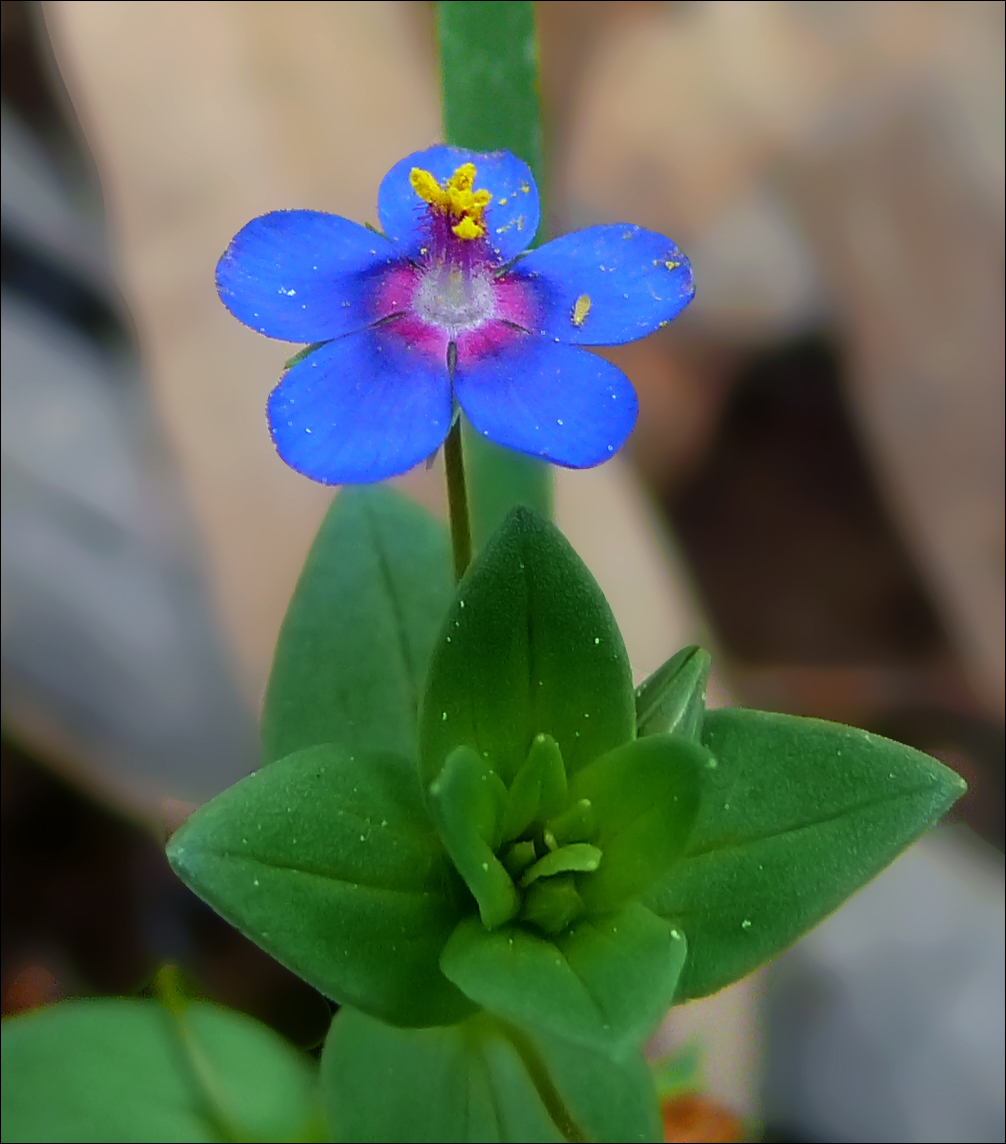
Blue form

Lysimachia arvensis, syn. Anagallis arvensis, commonly known as scarlet pimpernel, red pimpernel, red chickweed, poor man's barometer, poor man's weather-glass, shepherd's weather glass or shepherd's clock, is a species of low-growing annual plant with brightly coloured flowers, most often scarlet but also bright blue and sometimes pink. The native range of the species is Europe and Western Asia and North Africa. The species has been distributed widely by humans, either deliberately as an ornamental flower or accidentally. L. arvensis is now naturalised almost worldwide, with a range that encompasses the Americas, Central and East Asia, the Indian subcontinent, Malesia, the Pacific Islands, Australasia and Southern Africa.

This common European plant is generally considered a weed and is an indicator of light soils, though it grows opportunistically in clay soils as well. The origin of the name pimpernel comes from late Middle English pympernele [1400–50], derived from Middle French pimprenelle, from Old French piprenelle, and ultimately from Vulgar Latin *piperīnella (piper 'pepper' + -īn- '-ine' + -ella diminutive suffix).

The flower serves as the emblem of the fictional hero the Scarlet Pimpernel.

== Description ==
When found as a summer annual, the scarlet pimpernel has a low-growing creeping habit, but as a winter annual, it forms a half-rosette with an upright stem. It has weak sprawling stems with square cross-section growing to about 5–30 centimetres (2–12 in) long. They bear bright green, soft, ovate sessile leaves in opposite pairs. The orange, red or blue, radially symmetric flowers, about 10–15 millimetres (0.4–0.6 in) in diameter, are produced singly in the leaf axils from spring to autumn. The petal margins are somewhat crenate and have small glandular hairs. The stamens have lollipop hairs and therefore attract a variety of pollinators, especially flies, but the flowers are also capable of autopollination. The dehiscent capsule fruits ripen from August to October in the northern hemisphere. The weight of the fruiting body bends the stem, and the seeds are transported by the wind or rain. Blue-flowered plants (treated as L. arvensis f. azurea by some sources) are common in some areas, such as the Mediterranean region, and should not be confused with the related blue pimpernel, Lysimachia foemina. In 2007, a molecular phylogenetic study showed that Lysimachia foemina is more closely related to Lysimachia monelli than to Lysimachia arvensis, and should be treated as a separate species (all three species were then placed in Anagallis). The species has a diploid chromosome count of 2n=40.

Scarlet pimpernel flowers open only when the sun shines, and even close in overcast conditions. This habit leads to names such as "shepherd's weather glass". It has been observed along the verges of salted roads, creating a broad red band along the roadside.

Scarlet pimpernel has a wide variety of flower colours, which may be treated as forms, although not by Plants of the World Online which does not accept any subdivisions. The petals of the type arvensis are bright red to minium-coloured; carnea is deep peach; lilacina is lilac; pallida is white; and azurea is blue. The blue form can be difficult to distinguish from L. foemina, but the petal margins are diagnostic: whereas L. foemina has clearly irregular petal margins with only 5 to 15 glandular hairs, L. arvensis f. azurea has 50 to 70 hairs on only slightly irregular margins.

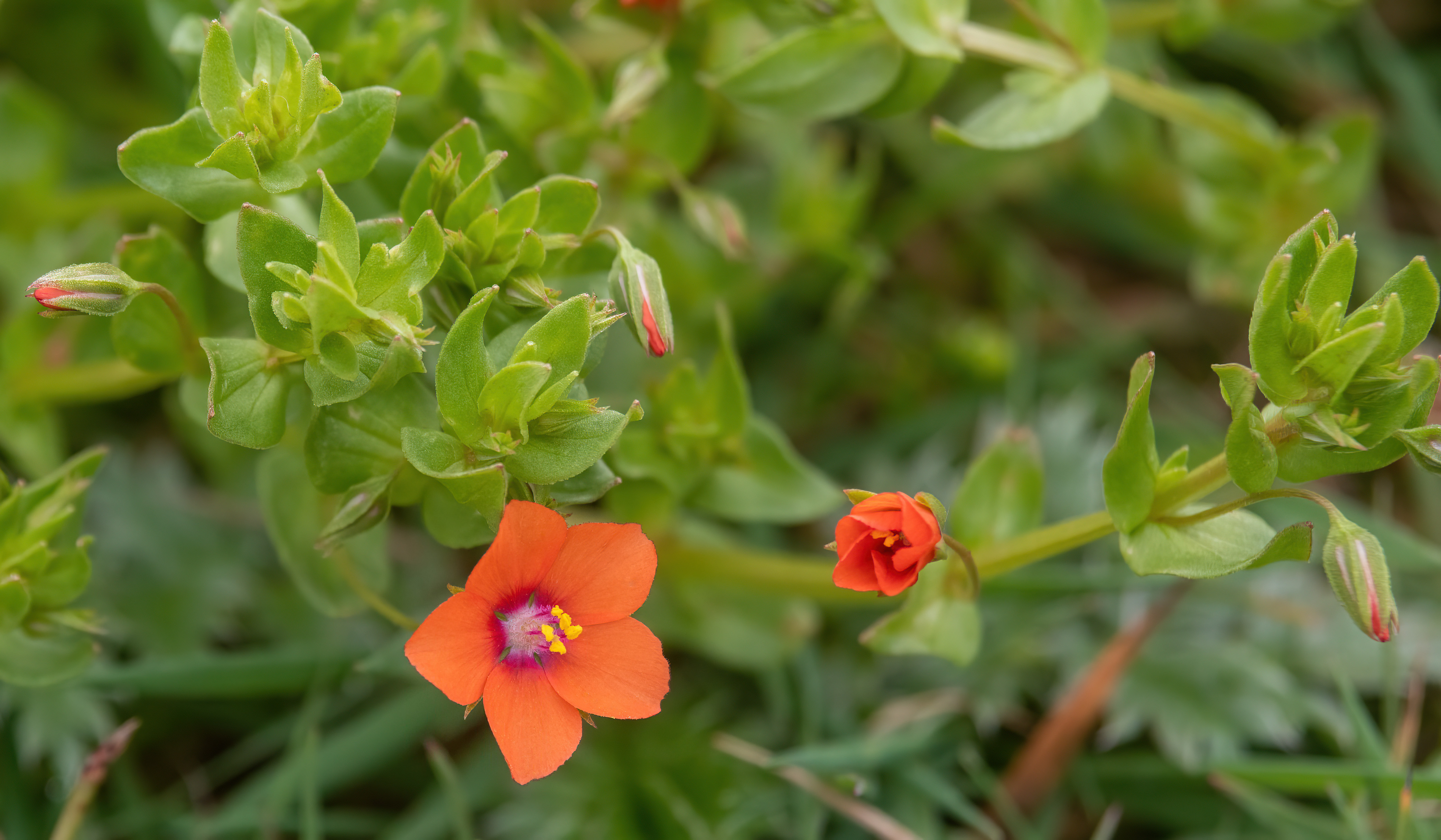

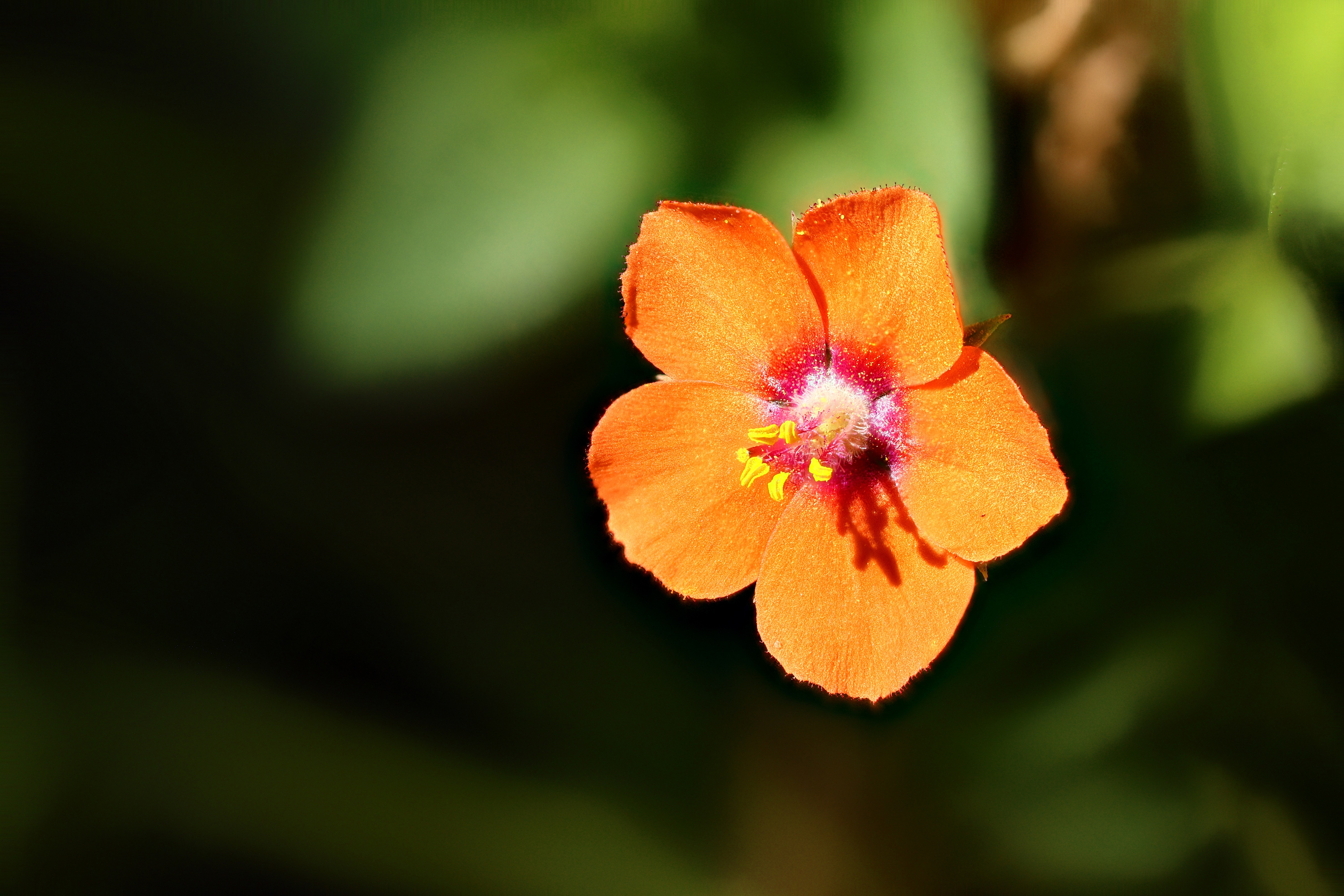
Flower close up

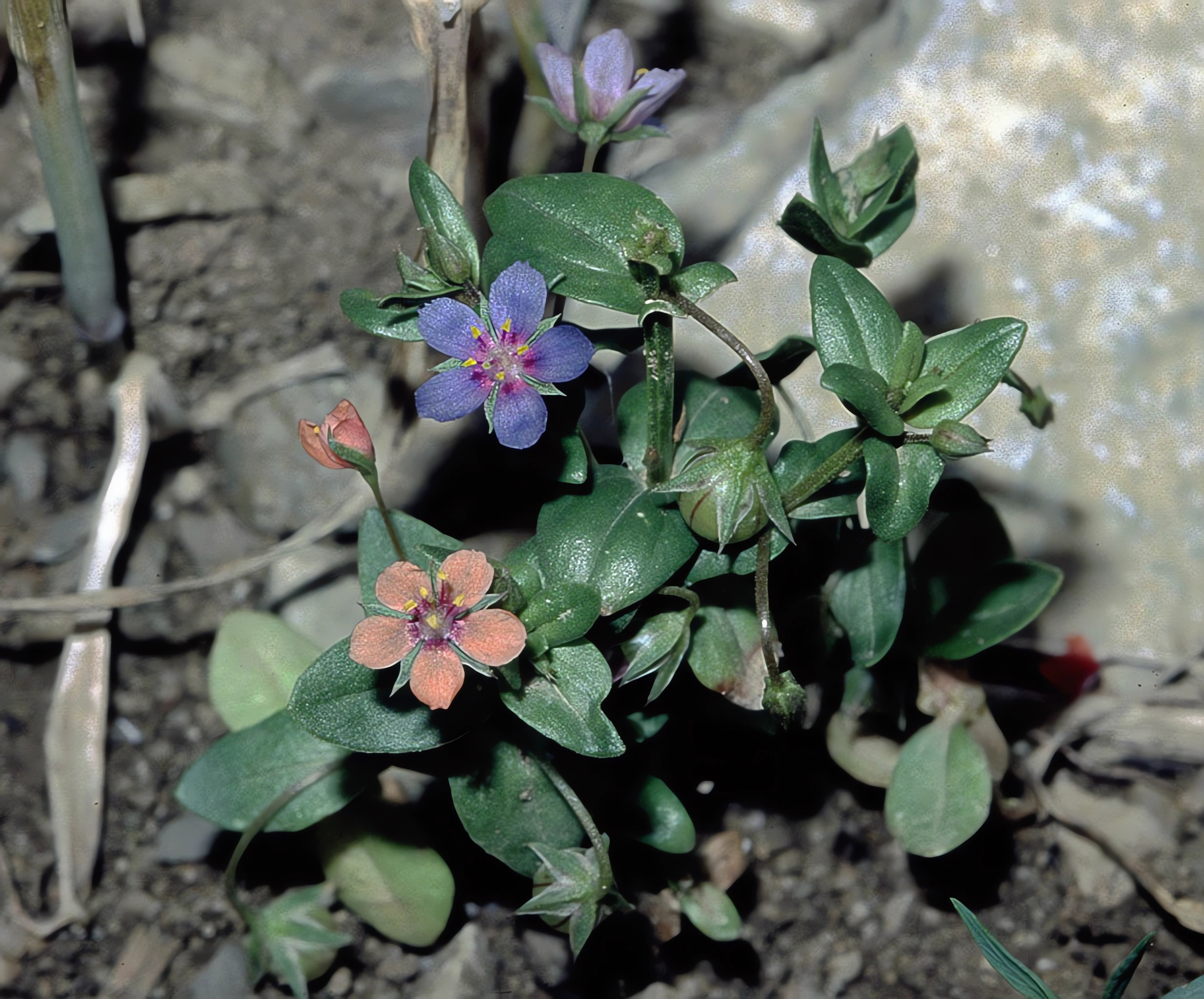
L. arvensis f. azurea together with a colour variant closer to f. carnea

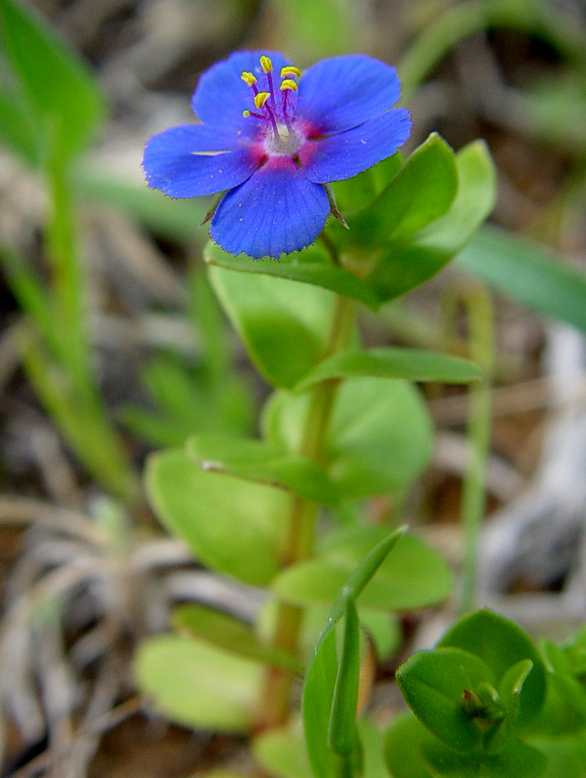
L. arvensis f. azurea. The glandular hairs on the petal margins, at least 50 in this example, are clearly visible in the enlarged photo.

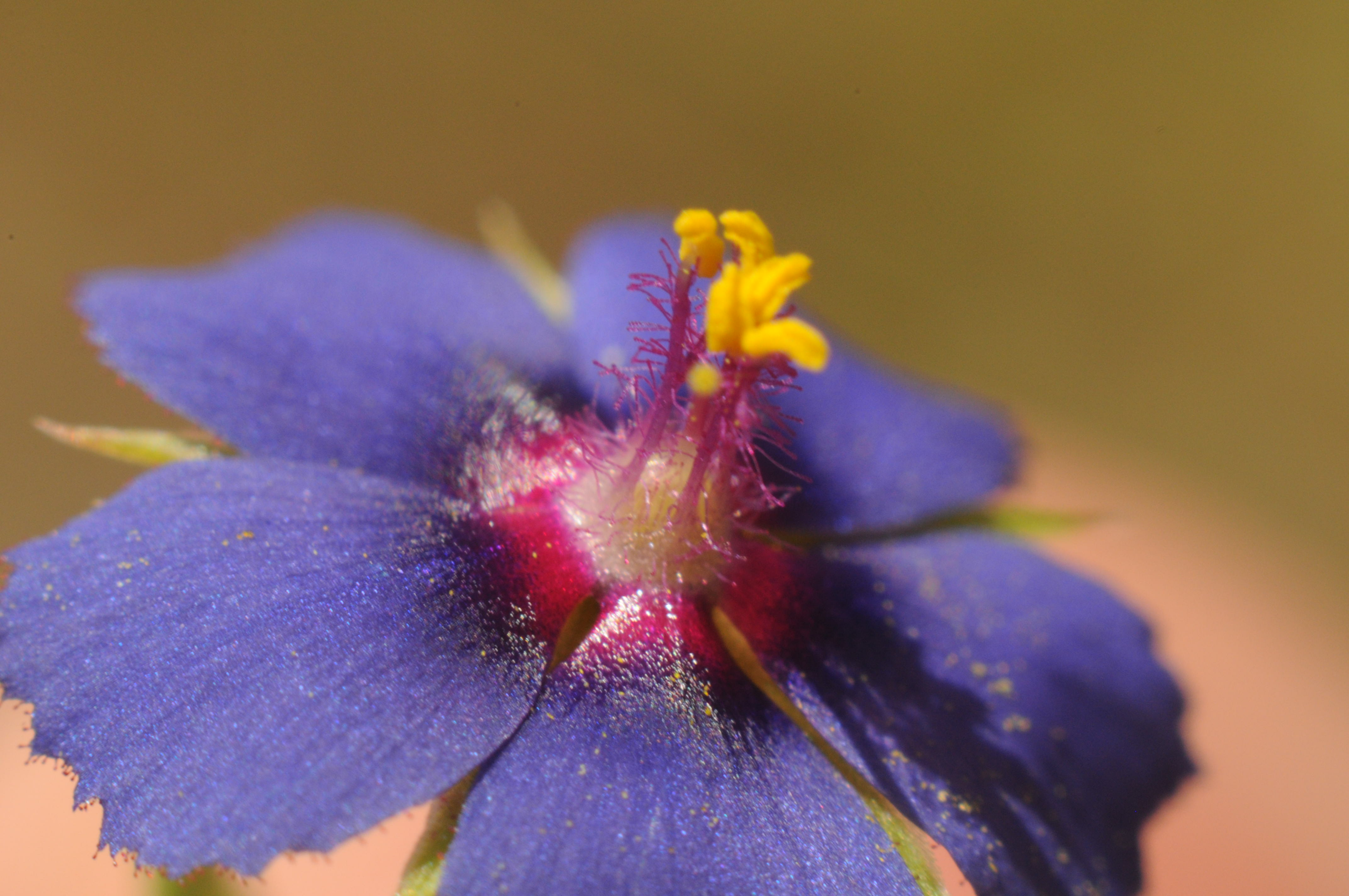
Purple form

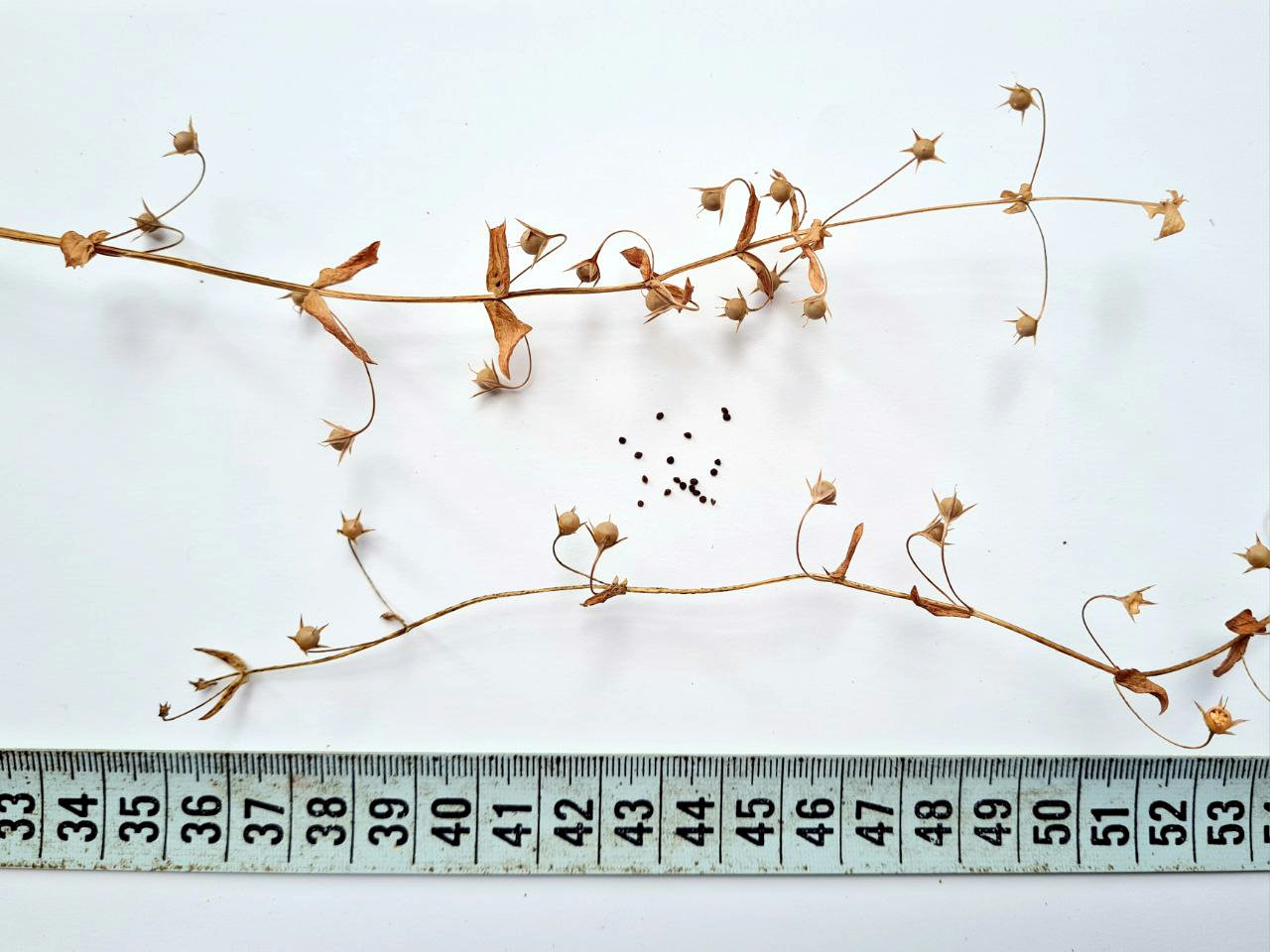
Fruits and seeds of Lysimachia arvensis

== Medical and agricultural significance ==
Lysimachia arvensis is generally unwelcome as a cosmopolitan invasive species; it is harmfully toxic in several respects and accordingly undesirable in pastures. The plant is acrid and bitter, and grazing livestock generally avoid eating it except in conditions of overgrazing or grazing of unsatisfying stubble. Experimental feeding of the plant material to various animals, such as horses and dogs, caused gastroenteritis. Sufficiently high doses proved fatal. Less specifically the herb has been reported as being toxic to poultry and rabbits, and the seed to birds.

Lysimachia arvensis is less often used in folk medicine worldwide than where it has long been familiar in its countries of origin. In various countries however, the plant material has been applied externally to slow-healing ulcers and wounds. It also has been applied as an expectorant and as a remedy for pruritus, rheumatism, haemorrhoids, rabies, leprosy, and snake-bite. Lysimachia has been used in treatment of non-specified types of phthisis, and of kidney-related conditions such as dropsy and chronic nephritis. It was used as an antidepressant in ancient Greece, and to treat various mental disorders in European folk medicine, leading to the German name Gauchheil (Gauch meaning 'fool, cuckoo' and heil meaning 'heal'). Generally however, documented evidence for clinical efficacy is lacking. Lysimachia arvensis is traditionally known by pharmacists as Arvensis Herba.

Lysimachia arvensis is insecticidal, or at least is repellent to some insects, possibly by virtue of its pungent essential oil which has a characteristic smell. Taken by mouth, experimental doses of the liquid in humans caused twenty-four hours of intense nausea, headache and bodily pain. Some people also experience dermatitis from contact with the leaf. Reports from Australia state that when grain crops have been infested by the weed, chaff that contains much of the material becomes unpalatable to stock as fodder. When grazing in pasture, livestock usually leave the plant alone, but when they do nonetheless eat significant quantities, they suffer diuretic and narcotic effects sufficiently intense to justify regarding the plant as poisonous. Reportedly an Indian practice of expelling leeches from dog nostrils can lead to fatal results if the animal swallows the fluid.

The herb and its seed contain saponins, which could explain why fresh material is strongly haemolytic. Among other possible glycosides, the root yields the triterpenoid glycoside cyclamin which is highly toxic and occurs in Cyclamen species, also a member of the subfamily Myrsinoideae.

The plant contains tanning agents, bitters, and the proteolytic enzyme primverase.

Antibacterial tests of the green parts failed to show any encouraging positive effect.

== In literature ==
Scarlet pimpernel (anicham in Tamil) is one of the two flowers mentioned in the Tirukkural.

The Scarlet Pimpernel is the alias of Sir Percy Blakeney in the novel of the same name by Baroness Emma Orczy and its numerous film and musical adaptations.

The fictional flower elanor is said to be a little enlarged version of pimpernel, according to one of J. R. R. Tolkien's letters. The flower elanor appears in The Lord of the Rings: Fellowship of the Ring, The Lord of the Rings: Return of the King, and in Unfinished Tales.

== Sources ==
- Blanchan, Neltje (2005). Wild Flowers Worth Knowing. Project Gutenberg Literary Archive Foundation.
- Harvey Wickes Felter and John Uri Lloyd (1898) King's American Dispensatory.
- Ulrika Manns; Arne A. Anderberg (2005). "Molecular Phylogeny of Anagallis (Myrsinaceae) Based on ITS, trnL-F, and ndhF Sequence Data". International Journal of Plant Sciences. 166 (6): 1019–1028. Bibcode:2005IJPlS.166.1019M. doi:10.1086/449318. S2CID 83727080.
