= Neltje Doubleday Kings =

American artist, businesswoman, and philanthropist (1934–2021)

- Born: Neltje Doubleday; October 10, 1934; New York City
- Died: April 30, 2021 (aged 86); Banner, Wyoming
- Other names: Neltje
- Occupations: artist, businesswoman and philanthropist
- Years active: 1966-2021
- Spouse: John Turner Sargent, Sr.
- Children: 2, including John Turner Sargent, Jr.
- Parents: Ellen Doubleday, mother; Nelson Doubleday, father
- Relatives: Nelson Doubleday Jr., brother

Neltje, also known as Neltje Doubleday Kings (October 10, 1934 – April 30, 2021), was an American artist, businesswoman and philanthropist. In 2005 Neltje received the Wyoming Governor's Art Award for her artwork; she was an abstract painter.

She has also created a variety of awards and programs to encourage writing and the arts, including the Neltje Blanchan Literary Award and the Jentel Foundation, which supports artists' residencies at her ranch in Banner, Wyoming.

In 2010, Neltje made an estate gift to the University of Wyoming, which it says is the largest in its history. It consists of her ranch, studio, art collection, and financial holdings. The UW Neltje Center for the Visual and Literary Arts is based at her ranch, creating a center for collaboration among three university departments.

== Early life and education ==
Born Neltje Doubleday in 1934, she is the daughter of Ellen McCarter and Nelson Doubleday, and has an older brother Nelson Doubleday, Jr. The siblings were born in New York City; they grew up in Oyster Bay, Long Island. The family also spent time in South Carolina. Nelson and Neltje attended private schools.

Their paternal grandparents were Neltje Blanchan De Graff and Frank N. Doubleday; their grandfather was the founder of the United States Doubleday publishing company. Their grandmother wrote books on gardens and birds. Their maternal grandfather Thomas McCarter was head of the New Jersey Public Service Commission and a benefactor of Princeton University.

== Marriage and family ==
In May 1953 at the age of 18, Neltje married John Turner Sargent, Sr., then 28 and already working at the Doubleday Company. They had a daughter Ellen and son John Turner Sargent, Jr. Sargent was promoted to leadership positions at Doubleday, where he later served as president and chairman.

After the couple divorced in 1965, Neltje moved with her young children to Wyoming. They also continued to see their father in New York. She started to draw at the age of 30 and became increasingly involved in making art.

By 1967, she married a Mr. Kings, an artist; they divorced after six years. Some years later, Neltje dropped her surnames, legally using only one name: Neltje.

Neltje Doubleday Kings died Friday, April 30, 2021 in Banner, Wyoming.

== Career ==
Neltje Doubleday left New York and moved to Banner, Wyoming, where in 1966 she bought a 440-acre ranch on Lower Piney Creek. She has since added to the property for cattle ranching and hay production. She operated the working ranch in part for preservation of historic and land resources; the original stone house was built soon after the Spanish–American War. There she has gradually built her art career, learning to paint and working in a variety of materials, including sculpting.

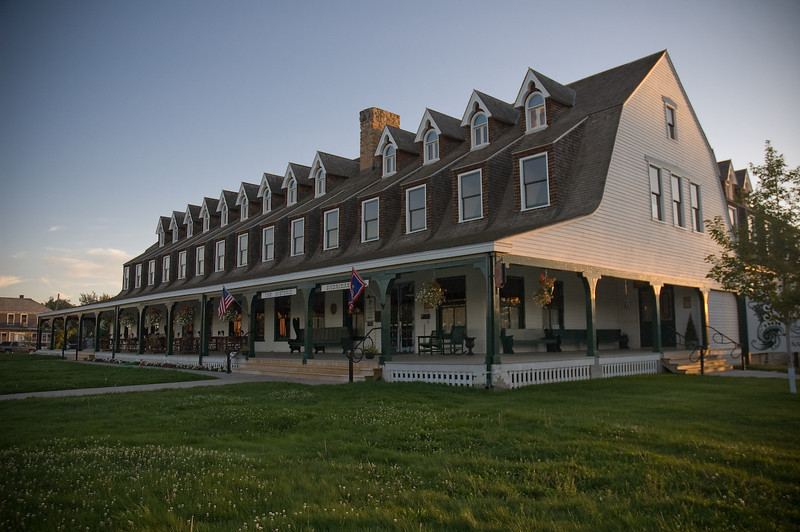
Sheridan Inn, photo in 2008

In 1967, the heiress bought the Sheridan Inn in Sheridan, Wyoming to save it from destruction; the property was a National Historic Landmark that had been condemned because of deterioration. She renovated parts of it, and in 1968, "re-opened the Inn’s saloon, which was followed a year later by the re-opening of the dining room, the Ladies Parlor and the Wyoming Room, an all new addition to the Inn." It was renewed as part of community life of the city. She owned and operated it for 18 years. Working in every aspect of its operations, she also added a gift shop and art gallery to the hotel interior. The inn has been owned since 1990 by the Sheridan Heritage Center, Inc.

In her art, Neltje has concentrated on painting abstract works. She is represented by galleries and her work is held in numerous private collections and museums, including the Smithsonian Institution; Wyoming State Museum, Cheyenne; and Yellowstone Art Museum, Billings, Montana.

She is the author of the 2016 memoir, North of Crazy (9781250088147).

== Philanthropy, legacy, and honors ==
In addition to creating her own artwork, Neltje has endowed and organized programs to encourage other artists and writers. As the leader of the Wyoming Arts Council, from 1985 to 1988, she established and endowed the Neltje Blanchan literary award, named in honor of her paternal grandmother, who used this pen name as an author of books about gardens and birds. In January 2001 she created the private Jentel Foundation, to support and manage artists' residencies at her ranch in Banner. Following the first pilot residencies of writers in 2001, the foundation had undertaken both renovation of existing buildings and new construction to create additional facilities to support the Jentel program. The program has expanded to admit artists and writers for short-stay residencies which run eleven months of the year. Applications are taken twice a year. In 2005 she received the Wyoming Governor's Art Award. She has also received an honorary degree from Rocky Mountain College in Billings, Montana.
