= Bird Neighbors =

1897 book by Neltje Blanchan

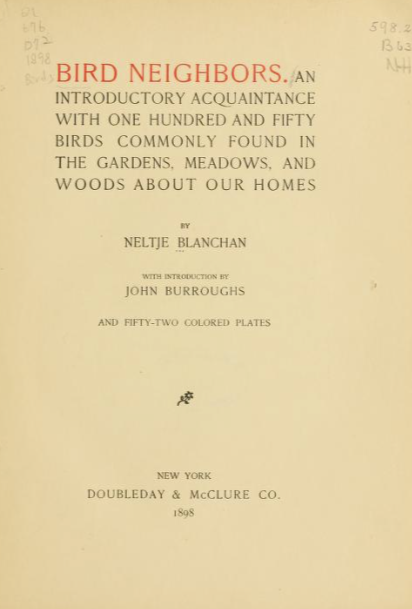
- Title page for Bird Neighbors (1898)
- Author: Neltje Blanchan
- Language: English
- Subject: Ornithology; Zoology
- Genre: Non-fiction
- Publisher: Doubleday
- Publication date: 1897
- Publication place: United States

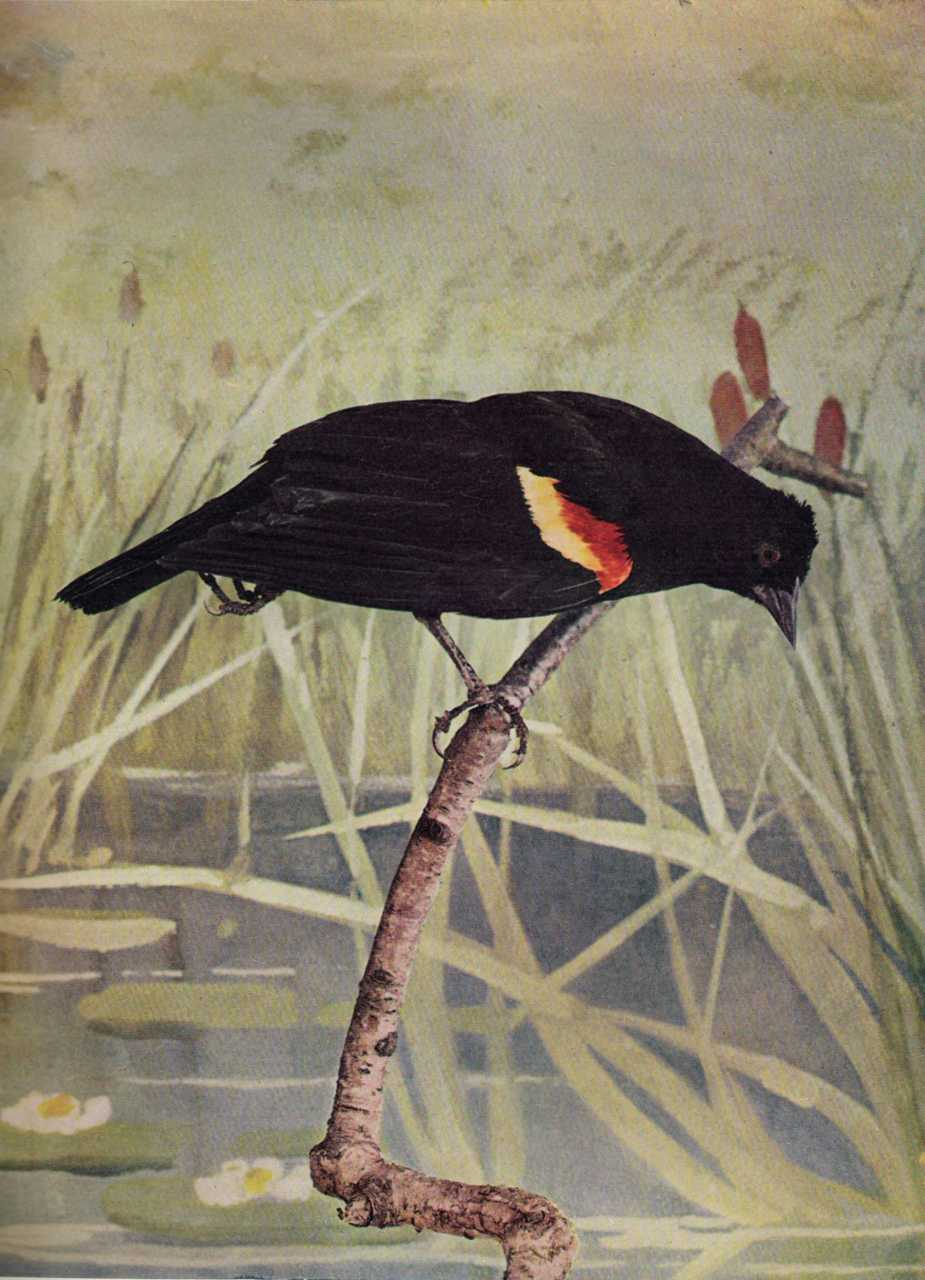
An illustration of a red-winged blackbird from Bird Neighbours. The position of the feet reveals that this is a posed photograph of a stuffed bird.

Bird Neighbors, published in 1897, was the first major work by American nature writer Neltje Blanchan. The book combined scientific data with color illustrations, accessible language, and personal experience reflecting Blanchan's joy in nature. In her introduction, naturalist John Burroughs praised it as "reliable" as well as "written in a vivacious strain by a real bird lover."

After discussing the scientific classification of birds by families, Blanchan lists 19 "habitats" where birds can be found (such as "birds seen near the edges of woods" and "birds found near salt water"), and groups the birds themselves by size and color. The 52 color illustrations were produced by photographing stuffed birds in front of appropriate backgrounds, since cameras of the time could not take good photographs of living birds. The published photographs were also limited by the color printing technologies of the time, and some of the darker birds have been described as looking like "they had been dipped in shoe polish."

Among the "birds conspicuously black" in the book is the red-winged blackbird, which is introduced this way:

In oozy pastures where a brook lazily finds its way through the farm is the ideal pleasure ground of this "bird of society." His notes, "h'-wa-ker-ee" or "con-quer-ee" (on an ascending scale), are liquid in quality, suggesting the sweet, moist, cool retreats where he nests ... satisfied with cut-worms, grubs, and insects, or with fruit and grain for his food – the blackbird is an impressive and helpful example of how to get the best out of life.

On publication, The New York Times praised the book's color prints and its ability to be "understood by all readers," and the following year included it in a list of "150 books for summer reading." Bird Neighbors sold over 250,000 copies, helping to make the author the best-selling female nature writer of her time.

Originally published by Doubleday, the book was republished by the Project Gutenberg Literary Archive Foundation in 1999.

== See also ==
- Nature's Garden: An Aid to Knowledge of our Wild Flowers and their Insect Visitors
- Wild Flowers Worth Knowing
- Birdwatching
- History of photography
