= Anagallis =

Genus of flowering plants

Anagallis is a formerly recognized genus of flowering plants in the family Primulaceae. It had about 20–25 species, commonly called pimpernels. Molecular phylogenetic studies showed that Anagallis was embedded in the genus Lysimachia, so its species were transferred to that genus. The scarlet pimpernel referred to in literature was part of this genus.

== Taxonomy ==
The genus name Anagallis is from the Greek ana (ἀνα- 'again') and agállein (ἀγάλλειν 'to delight in'), and it refers to the opening and closing of the flowers in response to environmental conditions.

Molecular phylogenetic studies have shown that as then circumscribed neither Anagallis nor the related genus Lysimachia were monophyletic. Accordingly in 2009, it was proposed to merge Anagallis (together with two other small genera) into Lysimachia. Names in that genus were published for all Anagallis species. As of March 2025, the merger was accepted by Plants of the World Online, among other taxonomic databases.

== Some former species ==
Species formerly placed in Anagallis include:

- Anagallis acuminata = Lysimachia acuminata
- Anagallis alternifolia = Lysimachia amoena
- Anagallis arvensis = Lysimachia arvensis – scarlet pimpernel, red pimpernel
- Anagallis barbata = Lysimachia barbata
- Anagallis brevipes = Lysimachia brevipes
- Anagallis crassifolia = Lysimachia tyrrhenia
- Anagallis djalonis = Lysimachia djalonis
- Anagallis filiformis = Lysimachia filiformis
- Anagallis foemina = Lysimachia foemina – blue pimpernel
- Anagallis gracilipes = Lysimachia gracilipes
- Anagallis hexamera = Lysimachia hexamera
- Anagallis kingaensis = Lysimachia kingaensis
- Anagallis minima = Lysimachia minima – chaffweed
- Anagallis monelli = Lysimachia monelli
- Anagallis nummulariifolia = Lysimachia nummulariifolia
- Anagallis oligantha = Lysimachia oligantha
- Anagallis peploides = Lysimachia peploides
- Anagallis pumila = Lysimachia ovalis – Florida pimpernel
- Anagallis rubricaulis = Lysimachia rubricaulis
- Anagallis schliebenii = Lysimachia schliebenii
- Anagallis serpens = Lysimachia serpens
- Anagallis tenella = Lysimachia tenella – bog pimpernel
- Anagallis tenuicaulis = Lysimachia tenuicaulis
- Anagallis tsaratananae = Lysimachia tsaratananae
