= Nelson Doubleday =

American publisher (1889–1949)

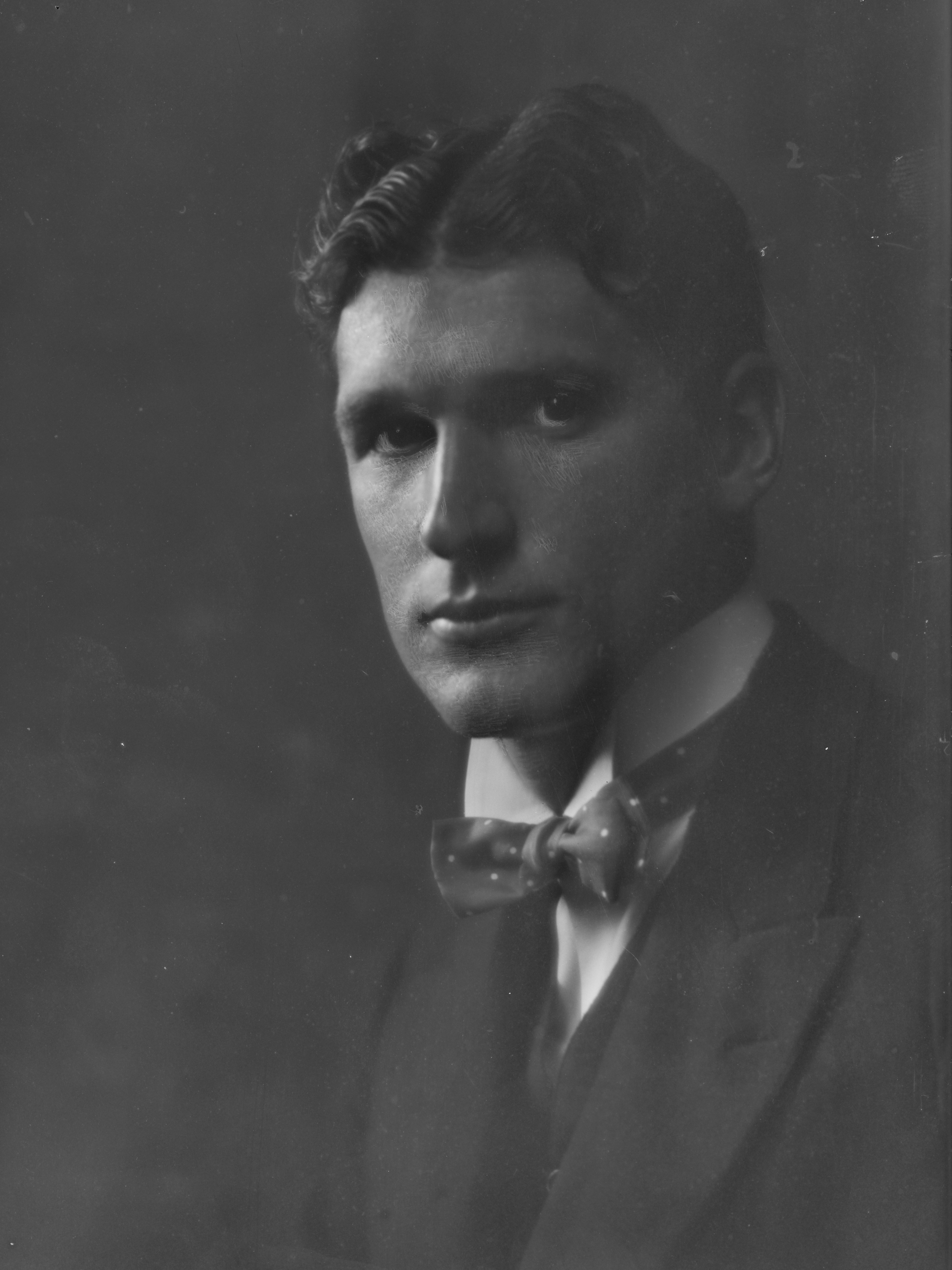
- Doubleday, c. 1916
- Born: June 16, 1889; Brooklyn, New York, U.S.
- Died: November 1, 1949 (aged 60); Oyster Bay, New York, U.S.
- Resting place: Locust Valley Cemetery
- Occupation: Book publisher
- Children: Nelson Jr.; Neltje
- Parents: Frank Nelson Doubleday; Neltje Blanchan

Nelson Doubleday (June 16, 1889 – January 11, 1949) was an American book publisher and president of Doubleday Company from 1922–1946. His father Frank Nelson Doubleday had founded the business. His son Nelson Doubleday Jr. followed him into it, taking part in expansion and serving as president from 1978–1986.

== Early life and education ==
Nelson Doubleday was born in Brooklyn, New York to Frank Nelson Doubleday (the first Doubleday ancestor came to Boston in the early 1600s from England) (the name Doubleday is English – possibly of Norman origin originally, DuBaldy ) and Neltje Blanchan. His older brother Felix Doty was adopted, and he had a younger sister Dorothy. In the city, the children attended a private Friends School run by Quakers. The family moved out to a large estate in Locust Valley on Long Island, called "Effendi" after their father's nickname given to him by his friend, the British author Rudyard Kipling. The author wrote his Just So Stories after the boy Nelson asked him to publish a book of animal stories.

Nelson grew up in the world of book publishing, as his father had founded the Doubleday company. His mother wrote several books about gardening and birds, which were considered notable for their combination of scientific content and lyrical expression.

Nelson later studied at Dr. Holbrook's Military School in Ossining, New York. He attended two years of New York University before joining his father in business, which he found more interesting. Even as a youth, he had creative solutions to business issues, for instance, suggesting selling dated magazines at a discount and thereby gaining some revenue from them.

== Career ==
Doubleday established his own business in 1910 and used the profits to publish books under his own imprint. After serving in World War I, he joined his father's firm, Doubleday, Page and Company, as a junior partner. After the firm merged with Doran Company, and upon his father's death in 1934, Nelson Doubleday became chairman of the board of Doubleday, Doran Company, Incorporated. He remained chairman of the firm (later Doubleday and Company) until his death in 1949. With some expansion, he still maintained Doubleday as a family publishing business, with one associated book club.

== Marriage and family ==
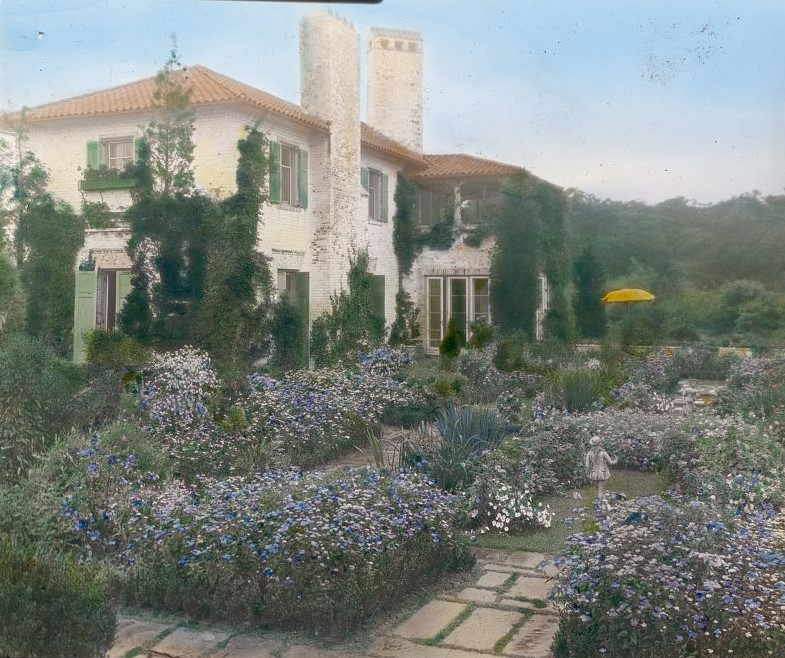
"Barberrys," Nelson Doubleday house, Mill Neck, New York, by Frances Benjamin Johnston, 1921. Architect: Harrie Thomas Lindberg (1916). Landscape: Percival Gallagher, Olmsted Brothers, 1919–1924 and others

He married Ellen McCarter (1899–1978). Her father was an attorney who organized the Public Service Corporation in New Jersey, serving as president for its first 36 years.

They had a son Nelson Doubleday Jr. (1933–2015) and a daughter Neltje (1934–2021), named for Nelson's mother. At age 18, Neltje married John Turner Sargent, Sr., who was already working at Doubleday, and they had two children. Nelson senior died, aged 59, in Oyster Bay, Long Island.

Both Sargent and Nelson Doubleday, Jr., worked for Doubleday. Beginning with Sargent in 1963, each served as president. Nelson Jr. served as president from 1978 to 1986 when, following wide changes in the publishing business, he sold the company to the German conglomerate, Bertelsmann.

After the Sargents divorced in 1965, Neltje moved to Wyoming with her two children. She remarried, bought a ranch and restored and operated the historic Sheridan Inn, and became an abstract artist. In the 1980s, she created the "Neltje Blanchan Literary Prize" in honor of her paternal grandmother. In 2001, Neltje founded Jentel, an artist-in-residence program supported by her private family foundation. In 2005, Neltje received the Governor's Art Award as one of Wyoming's "preeminent artists." In 2010, she made an estate gift of her ranch, studio, art collection and financial holdings to the University of Wyoming, the largest in its history.

== Legacy and honors ==
Ellen Doubleday left her collection of Doubleday business and personal documents to Princeton University. The Ellen McCarter Doubleday Papers, circa 1930s–1978 contain business and social correspondence, documents by and from Doubleday authors, personal and family letters, and issues related to Doubleday estates.
