= Nature's Garden =

Book by Neltje Blanchan

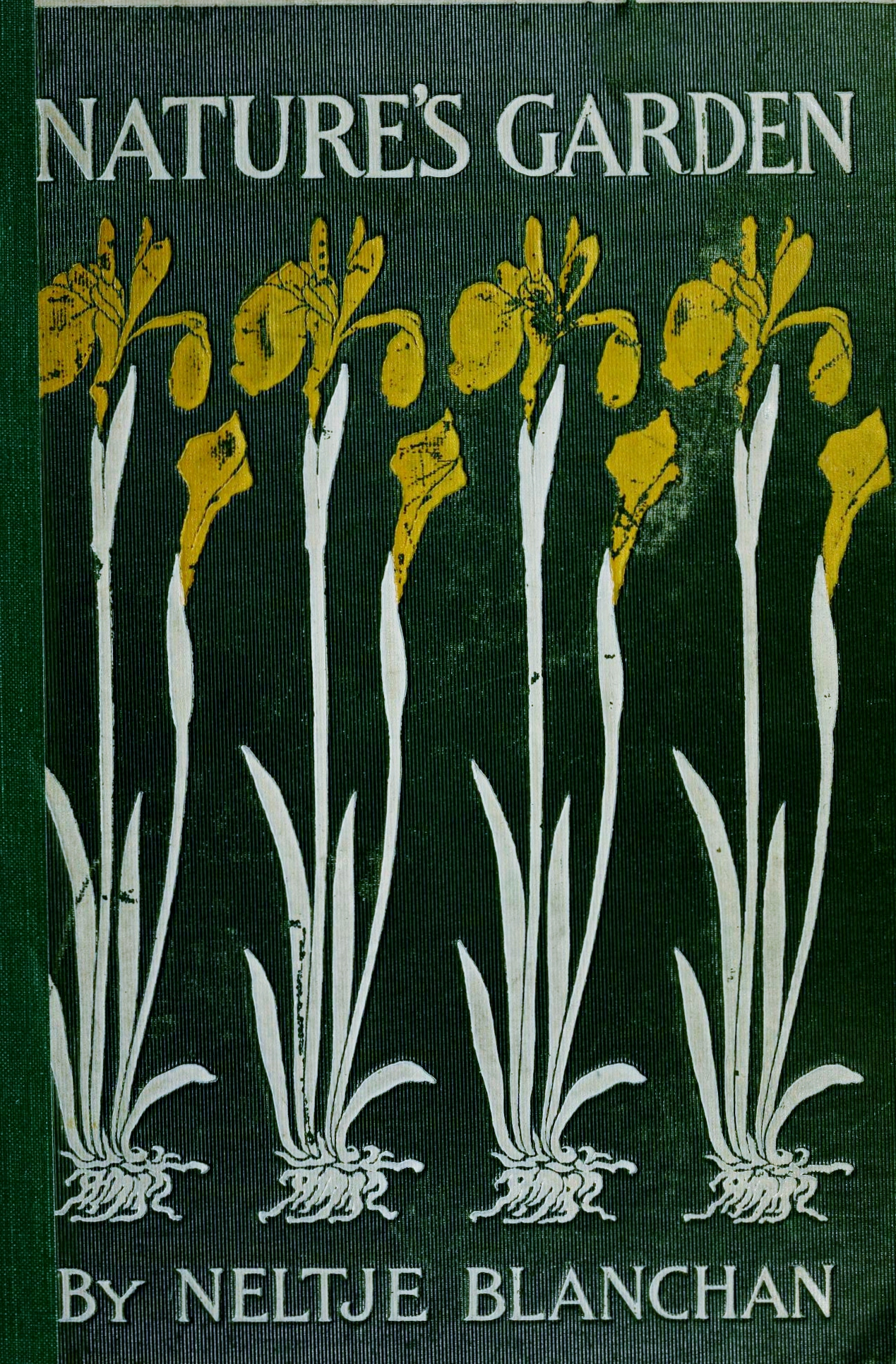
- First edition cover
- Author: Neltje Blanchan
- Publisher: Doubleday, Page & Company
- Publication date: 1900, 1901

Nature's Garden: An Aid to Knowledge of our Wild Flowers and their Insect Visitors (1900), republished as Wild Flowers: An Aid to Knowledge of our Wild Flowers and their Insect Visitors (1901), is a book written by nature writer Neltje Blanchan and published by Doubleday, Page & Company. In order to aid the amateur botanist, it used color to classify flowers, noting that this made it easier for novices to identify specimens, and that insects also used color to identify plants. The book also explored the relationship between flowers and the insects that feed on their nectar, using rather anthropomorphic language, and discussed scientific questions of the time, such as Sprengel's theory that orchids produce no nectar. Her description of the flowers also referred to relevant poetry and folklore. Unlike her book Bird Neighbors, the photographs (by Henry Troth and A. R. Dugmore) were taken directly from nature.

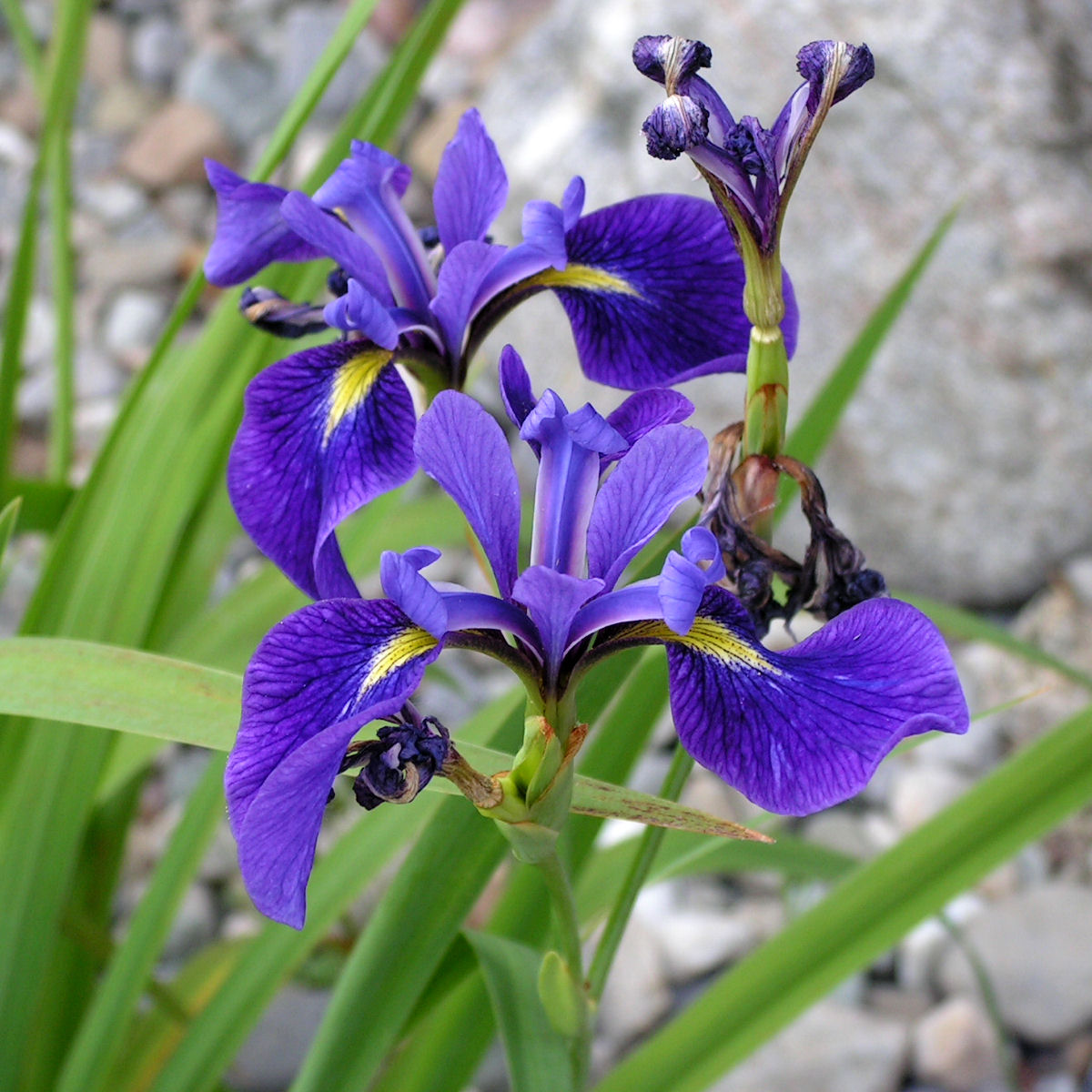
Iris versicolor, one of the flowers described in the book.

In discussing the Larger Blue Flag (Iris versicolor), to take one example, Blanchan notes botanical characteristics of the flower, and a preference for marshes and wet meadows, but also quotes the poet John Ruskin, mentions anecdotes involving Napoleon, and continues by discussing the pollination process:

But even in the meadows of France Napoleon need not have looked far from the fleurs-de-lis growing there to find bees. Indeed, this gorgeous flower is thought by scientists to be all that it is for the bees' benefit, which, of course, is its own also. ... The large showy blossom cannot but attract the passing bee, whose favorite color (according to Sir John Lubbock) it waves. The bee alights on the convenient, spreading platform, and, guided by the dark veining and golden lines leading to the nectar, sips the delectable fluid shortly to be changed to honey. Now, as he raises his head and withdraws it from the nectary, he must rub it against the pollen-laden anther above, and some of the pollen necessarily falls on the visitor....

On publication, monthly journal The Plant World described the book as "charming in its language, instructive and entertaining in its descriptions, and above all, fascinating in its wealth of beautifully executed illustrations," while The New York Times wrote that "this kind of a popular flower book has long been wanting in America."

In 1917, Asa Don Dickinson reorganised and substantially adapted the book as Wild Flowers Worth Knowing. The original book was republished by the Project Gutenberg Literary Archive Foundation in 2002.
