= Douglas Black (publisher) =

American lawyer and publishing executive (1895–1977)

- Born: Douglas McCrae Black; July 25, 1895; Queens, New York, New York, US
- Died: May 15, 1977 (aged 81)
- Education: Columbia University
- Occupations: Lawyer and publishing house executive
- Known for: President of Doubleday and Company (1946–1963), and president of the American Book Publishers Council

Douglas McCrae Black (July 25, 1895 – May 15, 1977) was an American lawyer and publishing house executive, president of Doubleday and Company from 1946 to 1963 and president of the American Book Publishers Council.

== Life and career ==
Black was born in Queens, New York, New York, the son of John William Black (1861–1956), a newspaper editor, and Flora Elizabeth Blayney (1863–1940). Black was educated at Columbia University (class of 1916) – where he was a member of the Philolexian Society, and was awarded the Washington Prize – and Columbia Law School (class of 1918).

On September 11, 1920, Black married Maude T. Bergen (1894–1987), daughter of Benjamin Bergen, and they had one child, Virginia Bergen Black (1924–1994). Black was a lawyer in private practice for many years.

When Nelson Doubleday resigned as president in 1946, Black took over and was president of Doubleday and Company from 1946 to 1963. By 1947, Doubleday was the largest publisher in the US, with annual sales of over 30 million books.

Black and his wife were close friends of U.S. President Dwight D. Eisenhower and his wife Mamie Eisenhower for more than 20 years and Black was responsible for Doubleday publishing Eisenhower's four volumes of autobiography. The "Douglas M. Black Dwight D. Eisenhower Collection", including over 200 letters and notes exchanged, is at St. Lawrence University.

Black was a keen advocate of freedom of speech and lost a $60,000 court case defending Edmund Wilson's Memoirs of Hecate County, which was banned. Black was also involved in trying to publish Vladimir Nabokov's controversial 1955 novel Lolita in the US.

Black was a trustee of Columbia University, and a director of the Council on Library Resources.
