= Wild Flowers Worth Knowing =

1917 book by Neltje Blanchan and Asa Don Dickinson

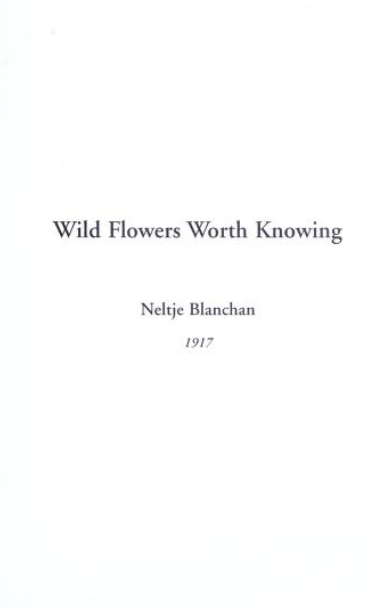
- Title page for Wild Flowers Worth Knowing (1917)
- Author: Neltje Blanchan, Asa Don Dickinson
- Publisher: Doubleday, Page & Company
- Publication date: 1917, 1922

Wild Flowers Worth Knowing is a book published in 1917 (and republished in 1922) as a result of an adaptation by Asa Don Dickinson of Neltje Blanchan's earlier work Nature's Garden (1900).

== Scope ==
It covers mostly North American species, with a sprinkling of cosmopolitans, and includes a preface by Blanchan (who died in 1918). The book, along with Birds Worth Knowing (also by Blanchan), and other books such as Animals Worth Knowing, was part of the Little Nature Library series published by Blanchan's husband Frank Nelson Doubleday.

== Structure ==
It contains over 40 color illustrations accompanying the text, which is arranged by plant family under the classification system of Gray's New Manual of Botany as revised by Robinson and Fernald. This is in contrast to Blanchan's earlier work, where the flowers were organized by color. The text of the newer work was also somewhat simplified, and had fewer illustrations than the earlier one.

== Reception ==
Wild Flowers Worth Knowing was briefly reviewed by The Outlook along with a few other books in the Little Nature Library series as, "well printed, well illustrated, and admirably adapted for home and school use." The New York Times review of the book series concludes that the books are "beautifully made" and that in this book the "descriptions are chatty and entertaining." The review goes on to comment that beginners may have difficulty in using Wild Flowers as a practical field guide because it assumes the user can identify the specimen to a plant family.

== Public domain ==
The book was also republished by the Project Gutenberg Literary Archive Foundation in 2005.

== See also ==
- Bird Neighbors
