= Nelson Doubleday Jr. =

American businessman

- Born: July 20, 1933; Oyster Bay, New York, US
- Died: June 17, 2015 (aged 81); Locust Valley, New York, US
- Occupations: Owner of Doubleday and Company (1978–1985); Co-owner of the New York Mets (1986–2002)
- Father: Nelson Doubleday
- Awards: 2× National League champions (1986, 2000); World Series champions (1986)

Nelson Doubleday Jr. (July 20, 1933 – June 17, 2015) was the owner and the next-to-last president and CEO of Doubleday and Company before its sale to Bertelsmann A.G. in 1986. He was instrumental in the company's purchase of the New York Mets in 1980.

After selling Doubleday Publishing, Doubleday personally bought a 50 percent stake in the Mets in 1986, with team president Fred Wilpon buying the remaining 50 percent. Doubleday remained chairman of the board of the Mets, a post which he had held since 1980. In 2002, Doubleday sold his interest in the New York Mets to Wilpon and Wilpon's family, in an acrimonious transaction that saw a dispute over the team's value.

== Early life and education ==
Nelson Doubleday Jr. was born July 20, 1933, in Oyster Bay, Long Island, as the son of Ellen McCarter and Nelson Doubleday, and had a younger sister Neltje. Their father owned Doubleday Publishing, which was founded by Nelson Sr.'s father Frank N. Doubleday. Their paternal grandmother Neltje Blanchan De Greff published books on gardens and birds. He grew up in Oyster Bay and in South Carolina. He attended the Green Vale School in Glen Head, then the Eaglebrook School and Deerfield Academy, both in Deerfield, Massachusetts. After Deerfield, Doubleday attended Princeton, where he earned a degree in economics, and played baseball, football and ice hockey. Upon his graduation in 1955, Doubleday served in the United States Air Force and was stationed at Myrtle Beach, South Carolina.

== Career ==
Growing up as the son and grandson of owners of a major book publishing house, Nelson Doubleday Jr. was determined to join the family business. Entering Doubleday as a young man as an assistant in the promotion and subsidiary rights departments, he learned the business by progressing through a variety of positions. He became the president of Doubleday in 1978. In the 1970s, he made investments in the Oakland Seals and the New York Islanders.

In 1980, he was instrumental in the company's decision to buy the New York Mets baseball team from the Payson family, putting up 80% of the $21.1 million price tag and became chairman of the board of the Mets. The remaining 20% came from partners City Investing Corporation and Fred Wilpon. Wilpon and Doubleday put in an additional $20 million over the next three years to rebuild the franchise. The pair built the franchise into a pennant contender in 1984 and 1985 and winner of the 1986 World Series. The team also saw attendance rise significantly and earn $6 million.

In 1985, Doubleday saw a decline in sales from 1980 and hired James R. McLaughlin, the head of Dell Publishing, a Doubleday subsidiary, to streamline and downsize. Doubleday's tenure as president ended in 1985; he was succeeded by McLaughlin, who was president during 1985 and 1986. In 1986, Doubleday sold the publishing company to Bertelsmann AG for a reported $475 million. That same year, Doubleday bought a 50 percent stake in the Mets in his own name. Wilpon bought the remaining 50 percent to become a full partner.

In 2002, Doubleday sold his stake in the Mets to Wilpon for $135 million, thus making Wilpon the sole owner of the Mets.

== Personal life ==
Doubleday married Florence McKim, the daughter and step-daughter, respectively, of Lillian Bostwick Phipps and Ogden Phipps. By 1972, they had divorced. In 1973, he married Sandra Pine Barnett (nicknamed Sandy). He had five daughters and one son.

Doubleday died of pneumonia at his Locust Valley, New York, home on June 17, 2015, aged 81.
