= Scarlet Pimpernel (disambiguation) =

The scarlet pimpernel (Lysimachia arvensis, syn. Anagallis arvensis) is a very common small annual plant, usually with red or orange flowers.

Scarlet Pimpernel may also refer to:

== Literature and theatre ==
- The Scarlet Pimpernel, a 1905 novel by Baroness Orczy based on a 1903 play by the same author, as well as the title character from said play and book
- The Scarlet Pimpernel (musical), a 1997 Broadway adaptation, or the song of the same name from the musical

== Film, television and radio ==
- The Scarlet Pimpernel, a 1917 American film adaptation starring Dustin Farnum
- The Scarlet Pimpernel (1934), a British film adaptation starring Leslie Howard
- The Return of the Scarlet Pimpernel (1937), a British film adaptation starring Barry K. Barnes
- The Scarlet Pimpernel (1952–53), a British radio series starring Marius Goring
- The Adventures of the Scarlet Pimpernel (1955–56), a British television series starring Marius Goring
- "The Scarlet Pimpernel" (1960), an episode of DuPont Show of the Month starring Michael Rennie
- The Scarlet Pimpernel (1982), a British television adaptation starring Anthony Andrews
- The Scarlet Pimpernel (1999–2000), a British television series starring Richard E. Grant
- The Scarlet Pimpernel (2017), a two-part BBC Radio 4 adaptation starring James Purefoy

== Music ==
- "Scarlet Pimpernel", an instrumental track on the Black Sabbath album The Eternal Idol

== See also ==
- The Scarlet Pumpernickel, a 1949 Looney Tunes animated short film spoofing the Orczy works
- Don't Lose Your Head, a 1967 British comedy film, which parodies the work
- Hugh O'Flaherty, Catholic priest and senior official of the Roman Curia, nicknamed "The Scarlet Pimpernel of the Vatican"
- Pimpinela Escarlata, a Mexican professional wrestler
