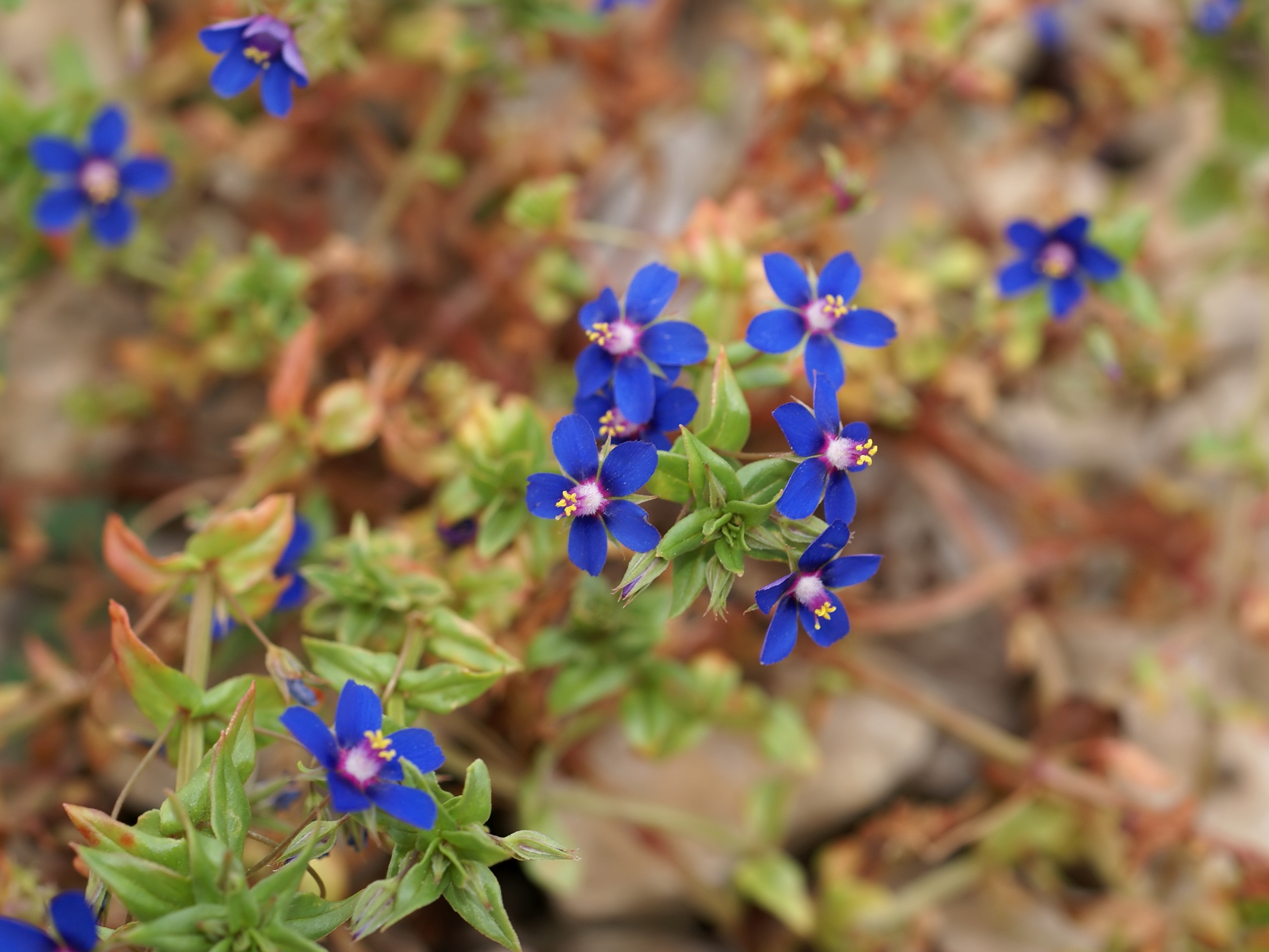
- Lysimachia foemina

Scientific classification
- Kingdom: Plantae
- Clade: Tracheophytes
- Clade: Angiosperms
- Clade: Eudicots
- Clade: Asterids
- Order: Ericales
- Family: Primulaceae
- Genus: Lysimachia
- Species: L. foemina

Binomial name
- Lysimachia foemina (Mill.) Manns & Anderb.

Synonyms
- Anagallis foemina Mill.; Anagallis arvensis subsp. foemina (Mill.) Schinz & Thell; Anagallis arvensis subsp. caerulea Hartm.

= Lysimachia foemina =

Species of flowering plant

Lysimachia foemina is commonly known as blue pimpernel or poor man's weatherglass, and was formerly called Anagallis foemina. It is a low-growing annual herbaceous plant in the genus Lysimachia of the family Primulaceae. In a comparison of DNA sequences, L. foemina was shown to be most closely related to L. monelli. It had been thought by many to be closest to L. arvensis, and some authors had even included L. foemina as a subspecies of L. arvensis, as Anagallis arvensis subsp. foemina. These three species (L arvensis, L foemina and L monelli) were among several transferred from Anagallis to Lysimachia in a 2009 paper.

== Etymology ==
The previous genus name Anagallis derives from the Greek words ana meaning "again" and agallein meaning "to delight in", possibly referring to the fact that these plants produce flowers twice in a year and the flowers open whenever the sun strikes them. The species epithet foemina means "female" and refers to the small size of the plant and the gentleness of its appearance. The common name refers to the fact that the flowers close at the approaching of the bad weather.

== Description ==
Lysimachia foemina has weak, square and sprawling stems growing to about 5–18 centimetres (2.0–7.1 in) long, which bear bright green sessile leaves in opposite pairs. The leaves are usually lance-shaped about 7–11 mm (0.28–0.43 in) wide and 12–16 mm (0.47–0.63 in) long, although some leaves, especially the lowest, may be ovate.

The small flowers are about 8 mm (0.31 in) in diameter, have a short stalk, are produced in the leaf axils and are usually blue. They have five lanceolate sepals and five petals. The filaments are about 3 mm (0.12 in) long, with showy yellow anthers. The flowering period extends from April to October. The hermaphroditic flowers are pollinated by insects (entomogamy). The fruit is a spherical capsule up to 4 mm (0.16 in) in diameter containing about 15 seeds.

This species is very similar to the related Lysimachia arvensis, and has been regarded as a subspecies of L. arvensis. In 2007, a molecular phylogenetic study showed that Lysimachia foemina is more closely related to Lysimachia monelli than to Lysimachia arvensis, and should be treated as a separate species.

=== Confusable species ===
Lysimachia foemina is widely confused with Lysimachia loeflingii (formerly Lysimachia arvensis var. azurea/caerulea). They can be distinguished by the large fruiting capsule's conspicuous veins (loeflingii 5–6 veined, foemina many more), petal shape/glanding (foemina narrow, separated petals with sparse (3)4-celled glands at tip (final cell ellipsoid), loeflingii usually broad touching petals with many 3-celled glands (final cell globose; see photo in Stace), flower stalk (foemina most stalks up to length of under-flower leaves, loeflingii often much longer), leaf shape/colour (foemina upper leaves rather narrow and usually dark, loeflingii broader and usually lighter).

== Distribution ==
This cosmopolitan plant is native to central and southern Europe and has been introduced in Africa, northern and eastern Asia, North and South America and western Australia.

== Habitat ==
It grows in scrub, uncultivated soils and grasslands. It prefers dry, nutrient- and lime-rich soils, at an altitude of 0–1,200 metres (0–3,937 ft) above sea level.
