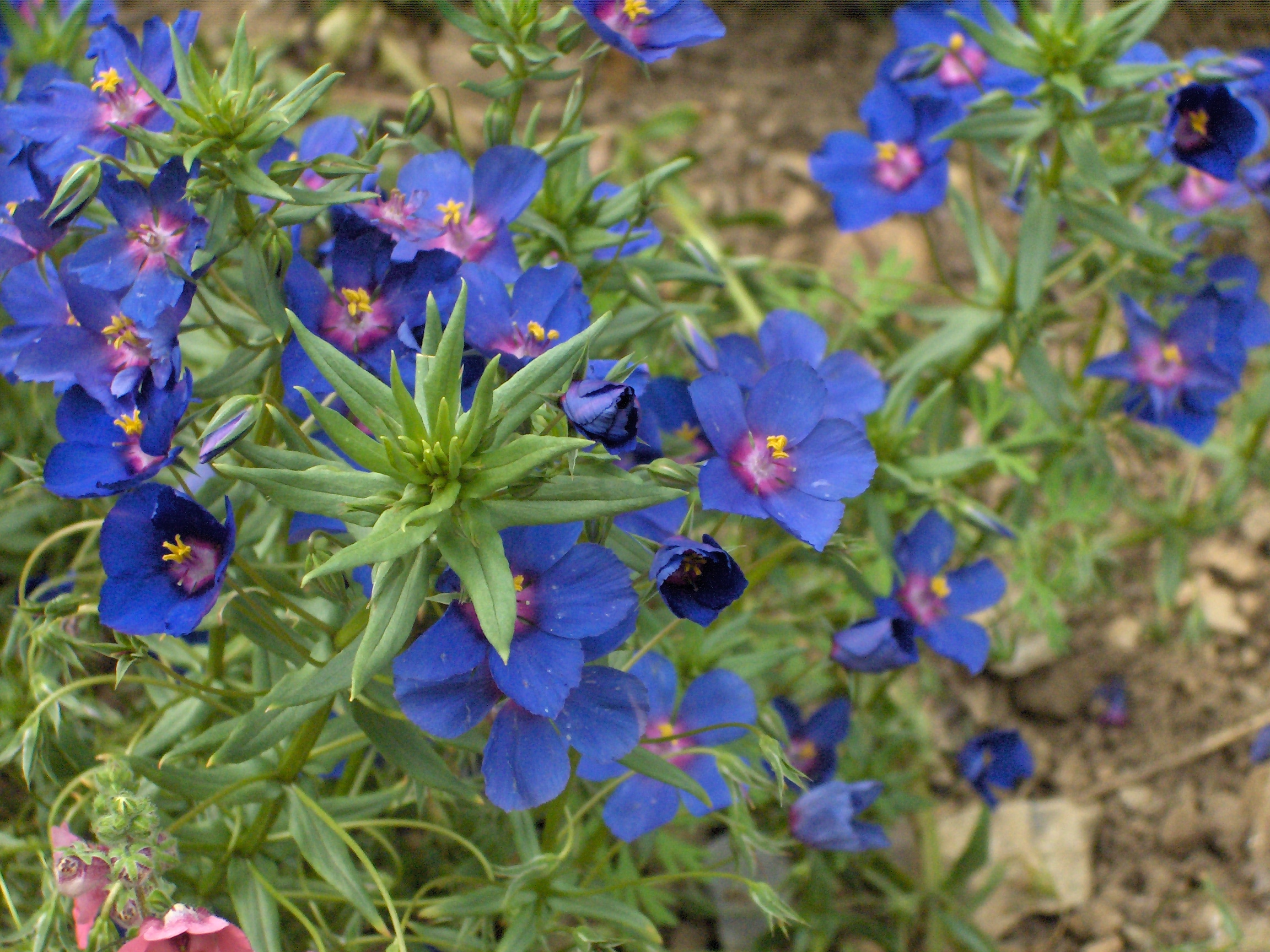
- Blue pimpernel (Anagallis monelli), the Skylover cultivar)
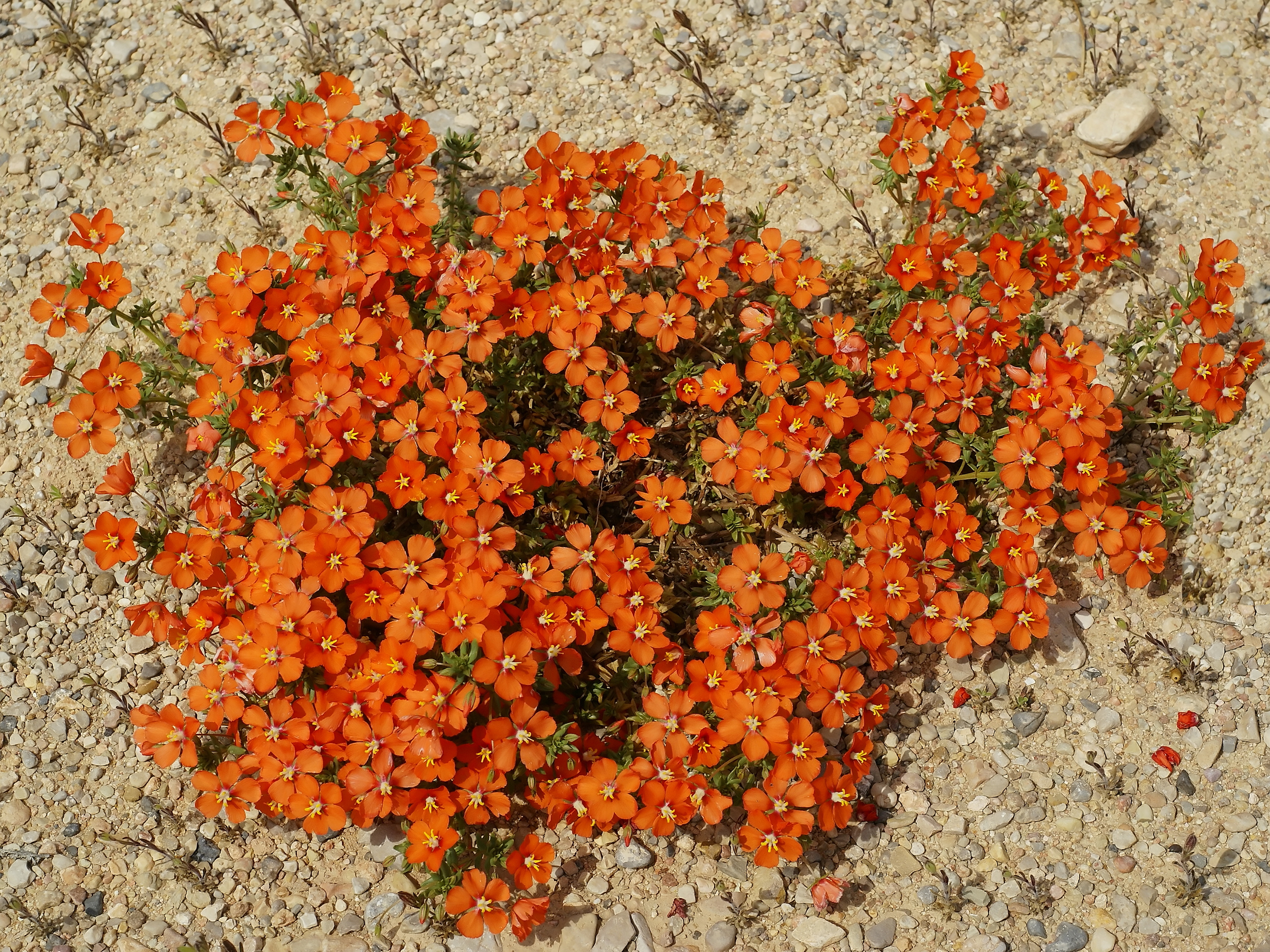
- Orange colour form of the Blue Pimpernel near el Perelló (Catalonia), Spain

Scientific classification
- Kingdom: Plantae
- Clade: Tracheophytes
- Clade: Angiosperms
- Clade: Eudicots
- Clade: Asterids
- Order: Ericales
- Family: Primulaceae
- Genus: Lysimachia
- Species: L. monelli

Binomial name
- Lysimachia monelli (L.) U. Manns & Anderb.

= Lysimachia monelli =

Blue pimpernel

Species of flowering plant

Lysimachia monelli, the blue pimpernel or garden pimpernel (formerly known as Anagallis monelli) is a species of flowering plant in the family Primulaceae, native to the Mediterranean region (in the Iberian Peninsula, Northwest Africa, Corsica, Sicily and the Balearic Islands). It is not to be confused with Lysimachia foemina, which has very similar blue flowers, but broader leaves and can be found also in colder climates. In a comparison of DNA sequences, L. monelli was shown to be most closely related to L. foemina. The latter had been thought by many to be closest to L. arvensis, and some authors had even included L. foemina as a subspecies of L. arvensis. The three species were among several transferred from Anagallis to Lysimachia in a 2009 paper.

Lysimachia monelli is a low-growing perennial with trailing stems. Wild specimens have blue or orange coloured flowers and are not sympatric with the blue-flowered plants growing natively in southern Spain and the orange in Morocco and southern Italy. A red variant was also developed by breeding at the University of New Hampshire. The orange-coloured flowers have a higher concentration of pelargonidin pigment, while blue flowers have a higher concentration of malvidin. The red-coloured flowers are due to the relative concentrations of delphinidin and malvidin pigments. In addition to the blue, orange and red forms, a white form of the flower also exists.

Although this is a perennial, in cultivation in temperate regions this plant is often grown as an annual. As Anagallis monellii it has gained the Royal Horticultural Society's Award of Garden Merit.

== See also ==
- Anagallis arvensis, the scarlet pimpernel.
