= Sheridan Inn =

- U.S. National Register of Historic Places
- U.S. National Historic Landmark
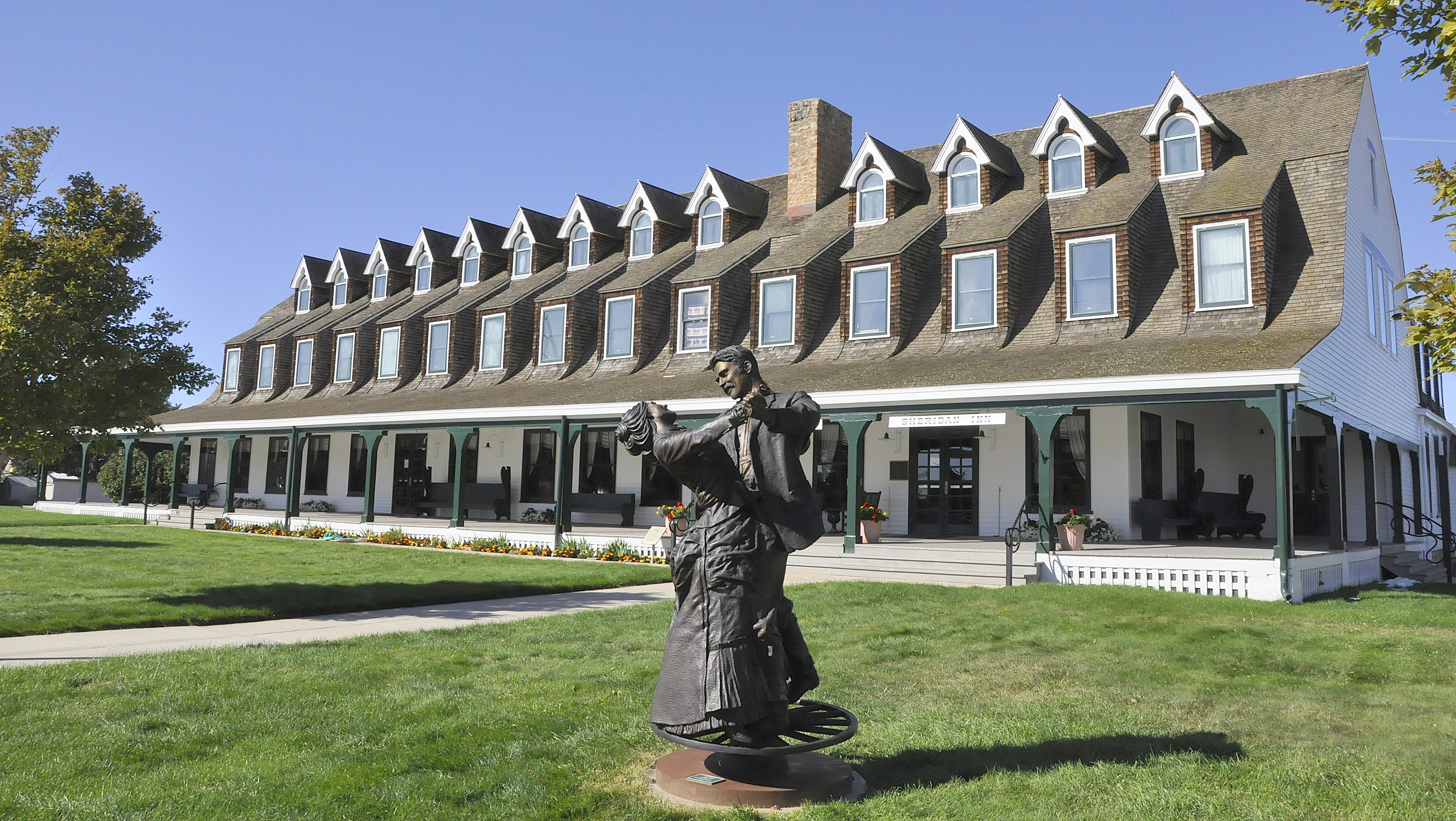
- Sheridan Inn

- Location within Wyoming Location within the United States
- Location: 856 Broadway (at 5th St.), Sheridan, Wyoming
- Coordinates: 44°48′23″N 106°57′14″W
- Built: 1893
- Architect: Thomas R. Kimball
- NRHP reference No.: 66000762

Significant dates
- Added to NRHP: October 15, 1966
- Designated NHL: January 29, 1964

The Sheridan Inn is a historic hotel in Sheridan, Wyoming. Designed by the architect Thomas R. Kimball of Omaha, Nebraska, in 1893, it was constructed by the Chicago, Burlington and Quincy Railroad as part of its development program in Wyoming associated with extension of the railway. Equipped with the first bathtubs and electric lights in that part of Wyoming, the inn was considered the "finest hotel" between Chicago and San Francisco. It was declared a National Historic Landmark in 1964.

Buffalo Bill Cody managed the hotel for the railroad from 1894 to 1896. He mostly attracted sportsmen for big game hunting in the Big Horn Mountains to the west, and hosted numerous notable guests. He often auditioned talent for his Wild West Show from the broad front porch during his ownership.

== Description and history ==
Designed in the style of hotels which Kimball had seen in Scotland, the three-story, wood-frame inn is 145 feet long under a gambrel roof, with broad porches 30 feet wide on two sides. The porches were designed with a gradual slope so that rainwater would run off. The hotel had 64 bedrooms on the second and third floors, each with its own dormer window. The large dining room sat up to 160 guests. The barns and livery stable associated with the Cody Transportation Company were at the rear of the property, but no longer survive. He ran a stage line between the inn and Deadwood, South Dakota. The inn was listed on the National Register of Historic Places when it was established in 1966.

After condemnation in 1967, the inn was purchased by Neltje Doubleday Kings, who had recently moved to the area from New York City. She undertook renovations and in 1968, "re-opened the Inn’s saloon, which was followed a year later by the re-opening of the dining room, the Ladies Parlor and the Wyoming Room, an all new addition to the Inn." The inn could host large social gatherings and became a center of community events. She also added a small gift shop and art gallery to the interior. She operated the inn for 18 years. She has since worked full-time as an artist, exhibiting her work under the name of Neltje.

Since 1990, the inn has been owned and operated by The Sheridan Heritage Center, Inc. The nonprofit organization has restored the entire outside of the building, installed a fire alarm system, and brought the first floor up to ADA standards and city codes. In 2006 it initiated a capital campaign to raise money for needed structural improvements in a "Core and shell" program, as interior conditions have deteriorated. Many rooms are smaller than current expectations for such space and spaces would need to be reworked. Plans are to redevelop upper floors to yield 22 rooms, with the entire facility to be operated as a boutique hotel. The national economy has affected fundraising and in April 2012, the inn faced foreclosure. On September 6, 2012, it was announced that the Sheridan Inn would close on October 1, 2012.

As of October 2013, the inn was purchased by Bob and Dana Townsend and Custom Services out of Tulsa Oklahoma. The first floor ballrooms have been reopened and a new restaurant named Open Range Bar & Grill opened in January 2015, but is now closed. The hotels rooms were opened to the public for the first time in over 50 years on May 15, 2015. The inn was then inducted into Historic Hotels of America, the official program of the National Trust for Historic Preservation.

== See also ==
- List of Historic Hotels of America
