= Frank Nelson Doubleday =

American publisher (1862–1934)

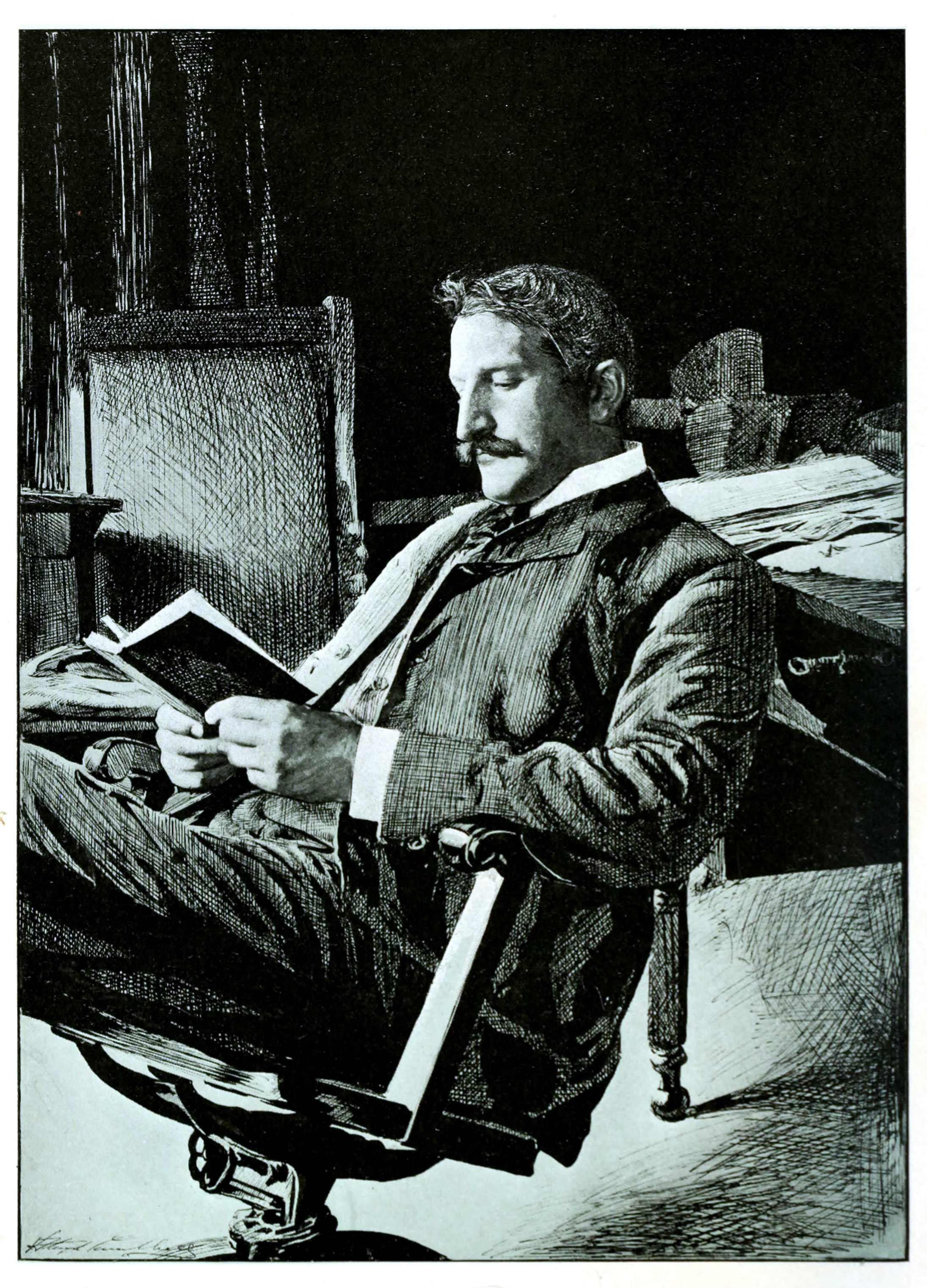
Frank N. Doubleday by V. Floyd Campbell

Frank Nelson Doubleday (January 8, 1862 – January 30, 1934), known to friends and family as "Effendi" (phonetic "F.N.D."), founded the Doubleday & McClure Company in 1897, which later operated under other names. Starting work at the age of 14 after his father's business failed, Doubleday began with Charles Scribner's Sons in New York.

His son Nelson Doubleday, son-in-law John Turner Sargent, Sr. and grandson Nelson Doubleday, Jr. all worked in the company and led it through different periods. In 1986, after years of changes in the publishing business, his grandson Nelson Doubleday, Jr. as president sold the Doubleday Company to the German group Bertelsmann.

== Early life ==
He was born on January 8, 1862, in Brooklyn, to William Edwards and Ellen M. Dickinson Doubleday.

His father was a hatter. Frank Doubleday's ancestors came to Boston in the early 17th century. Early in life, he became fascinated with the printing business. By age 10, he had saved up enough money to buy his own printing press. He earned back the cost by printing advertising and news circulars for local businesses, and from that point never left the business. Frank's distant relative Ulysses F. Doubleday was a book publisher earlier in the 19th century. When Doubleday was 14, his father's business failed. The youth had to leave school and find a full-time job.

== Career ==
He went to work at the firm of Charles Scribner's Sons in Manhattan in 1877 for the salary of $3 a week. Doubleday worked 18 years at Scribner's, eventually rising to become the publisher of Scribner's Magazine and head of Scribner's subscription book department. When his relationship with Scribner's soured, Doubleday left the company to go into partnership with Samuel S. McClure, publisher of McClure's Magazine.

They formed the Doubleday & McClure Co. in March 1897. The following year, Doubleday and McClure accepted a contract to manage the great publishing house of Harper & Brothers, at the instigation of their banker, J. Pierpont Morgan. On taking control, Doubleday dug thoroughly through Harper's books and decided that the company's finances were in a shambles; he convinced McClure and Morgan to call off the deal. (Harper had gone heavily into debt in the Panic of 1893, and the extension of copyright to foreign authors in 1891 put a large dent in Harper's principal business, the cheap domestic reprints of respected foreign authors.)

On December 31, 1899, growing tension between Doubleday and McClure led the two men to dissolve their partnership. The following year, Doubleday invited Walter Hines Page, former editor of The Atlantic Monthly, to join him; the new firm was Doubleday, Page & Co.

In 1921, Doubleday bought a controlling interest in the English publisher William Heinemann, after Heinemann died unexpectedly without leaving an heir. In 1927, Doubleday purchased the publishing house of George H. Doran, and his company became Doubleday, Doran & Co.

An anglophile, Frank Doubleday spent many working vacations in England exploring authors and publishers for U.S. editions. His personal friends included James Barrie, Andrew Carnegie, Alfred Harcourt, Edward Mandell House, Rudyard Kipling, T. E. Lawrence, Christopher Morley, Mark Twain. Through a cousin, he met John D. Rockefeller and either edited or ghost-wrote Rockefeller's autobiography.

Doubleday's nickname "Effendi" was coined by Kipling, derived from the initials F.N.D.

== Marriage and family ==
Doubleday married Neltje De Graff (1865–1918) on June 9, 1886, who published several books on gardens and birds. They adopted a boy Felix Doty, then had a son, Nelson, and daughter, Dorothy, together. Nelson Doubleday followed his father into the publishing business and served for years as president of the company, to be followed in 1978 by his own son, Nelson Doubleday, Jr. Neltje died in 1918 in Canton, China while taking working as the Commissioner for the Red Cross. After her death, Doubleday married Florence Van Wyck later that year.

== Sources ==
- Doubleday, Frank Nelson (1972). The Memoirs of a Publisher. Doubleday & Co.
