= Neltje Blanchan =

American scientific historian and nature writer (1865-1918)

Blanchan De Graff Doubleday (October 23, 1865 – February 21, 1918) was a United States scientific historian and nature writer who published several books on wildflowers and birds under the pen name Neltje Blanchan. Her work is known for its synthesis of scientific interest with poetic phrasing.

== Biography ==
=== Early life and education ===
Neltje Blanchan De Graff was born in Chicago to Liverius De Graff, a proprietor of a men's clothing store, and his wife Alice Fair. She was educated at St. John's Preparatory School in New York City and The Masters School in Dobbs Ferry, New York.

Neltje married Frank Nelson Doubleday in Plainfield, New Jersey, on June 9, 1886. They had two sons and one daughter: Felix Doty (adopted), Nelson (1889–1949) and Dorothy. They had homes in both New York City and Oyster Bay.

=== Writing career ===
Neltje Doubleday published eleven books under her pen name of Neltje Blanchan. Her works on wildflowers and birds were notable for their combination of scientific facts with poetic expression.

=== Community service ===
Neltje Doubleday entertained regularly and participated in philanthropic work for the American Red Cross.

In 1917, she visited the Philippines and China on special assignment as a commissioner for the Red Cross. She died suddenly in Canton, China on February 21, 1918, at age 52.

== Legacy and honors ==
- Some of her papers (1914–1918) are held in the Frank N. Doubleday and Nelson Doubleday Collection at the Princeton University Library.
- The Wyoming Arts Council established the Neltje Blanchan Literary Award (now called the Blanchan/Doubleday Writing Award), which is given annually to "a writer whose work, in any genre, is inspired by nature." The award was funded in Blanchan's memory by her granddaughter, Neltje Doubleday Kings, an abstract artist who served on the board of the council from 1985 to 1988. In 2010 Neltje Kings made an estate gift to the University of Wyoming, including her land, ranch and studio buildings, art collections, which is the largest in the history of the university. When realized, it will become the UW Neltje Center for the Visual and Literary Arts.

== Published works ==
- The Piegan Indians (1892)
- Bird Neighbors (1897)
- Nature's Garden (1900), republished as Wild Flowers: An Aid to Knowledge of our Wild Flowers and their Insect Visitors (1901)
- "What the Basket Means to the Indian", a chapter in Mary White's How To Make Baskets (1901)
- How to Attract the Birds (1902)
- Birds that Hunt and Are Hunted (1905)
- Birds Every Child Should Know (1907)
- The American Flower Garden (1909)
- Birds Worth Knowing (1917)
- Canadian Birds Worth Knowing (1917)
- Wild Flowers Worth Knowing (adapted from Nature's Garden by Asa Don Dickinson, 1917, 1922)
- Birds: Selected from the Writings of Neltje Blanchan (posthumously, 1930)
