= Doubleday (publisher) =

American publishing company

- Parent company: Knopf Doubleday Publishing Group (Penguin Random House)
- Status: Imprint
- Founded: 1897; 129 years ago
- Founders: Frank Nelson Doubleday; S. S. McClure
- Country of origin: United States
- Headquarters location: 1745 Broadway, New York City, U.S.
- Publication types: Commercial fiction, literary fiction, and serious nonfiction books
- Official website: knopfdoubleday.com/imprint/doubleday/

Doubleday is an American publishing company. It was founded as the Doubleday & McClure Company in 1897. By 1947, it was the largest book publisher in the United States. It published the work of mostly American authors under a number of imprints and distributed them through its own stores.

In 2009, Doubleday merged with Knopf Publishing Group to form the Knopf Doubleday Publishing Group, which, as of 2018, is part of Penguin Random House.

== History ==
=== 19th century ===
The firm was founded as Doubleday & McClure Company in 1897 by Frank Nelson Doubleday in partnership with Samuel Sidney McClure. McClure had founded the first American newspaper syndicate in 1884 (McClure Syndicate) and the monthly McClure's Magazine in 1893. One of their first bestsellers was The Day's Work by Rudyard Kipling, a short story collection that Macmillan published in Britain late in 1898. Other authors published by the company in its early years include W. Somerset Maugham and Joseph Conrad. Theodore Roosevelt Jr. later served as a vice-president of the company.

=== 20th century ===
The partnership ended in 1900. McClure and John Sanborn Phillips, the co-founder of his magazine, formed McClure, Phillips and Company. Doubleday and Walter Hines Page formed Doubleday, Page & Company.

The bestselling novels of Thomas Dixon Jr., including The Leopard's Spots, 1902 and The Clansman, 1905, "changed a struggling publishing venture into the empire that Doubleday was to become". At the same time, Doubleday helped Dixon launch his writing career. Page and Dixon were both from North Carolina and had known each other in Raleigh, North Carolina.

In 1910, Doubleday, Page & Co. moved its operations, which included a train station, to Garden City, New York, on Long Island. The company purchased much of the land on the east side of Franklin Avenue, and estate homes were built for many of its executives on Fourth Street. Co-founder and Garden City resident Walter Hines Page was named Ambassador to Great Britain in 1916. In 1922, the company founded its juvenile department, the second in the nation, with May Massee as head. The founder's son Nelson Doubleday joined the firm in the same year.

In 1927, Doubleday, Page merged with the George H. Doran Company, creating Doubleday, Doran, then the largest publishing business in the English-speaking world. Doubleday Canada Limited launches in the thirties. In 1944, Doubleday, Doran acquired the Philadelphia medical publisher Blakiston.

In 1946, the company became Doubleday and Company. Nelson Doubleday resigned as president, but continued as chairman of the board until his death on January 11, 1949. Douglas Black took over as president from 1946 to 1963. His tenure attracted numerous public figures to the publishing company, including Dwight D. Eisenhower, Harry S. Truman, Douglas MacArthur, Robert Taft, and André Malraux. He was a strong opponent of censorship and felt that it was his responsibility to the American public to publish controversial titles. Black also expanded Doubleday's publishing program by opening two new printing plants; creating a new line of quality paperbacks, under the imprint Anchor Books; founding mail-order subscription book clubs in its book club division; opening 30 new retail stores in 25 cities; and opening new editorial offices in San Francisco, London, and Paris.

By 1947, Doubleday was the largest publisher in the United States, with annual sales of more than 30 million books. In 1954, Doubleday sold Blakiston to McGraw-Hill.

Doubleday's son-in-law John Sargent was president and CEO from 1963 to 1978. In 1964, Doubleday acquired the educational publisher Laidlaw.

In 1967, the company purchased the Dallas-based Trigg-Vaughn group of radio and TV stations to create Doubleday Broadcasting. After expanding during the 1970s and 1980s, Doubleday sold the broadcasting division in 1986.

Nelson Doubleday Jr. succeeded John Sargent as president and CEO from 1978 to 1985.

In 1976, Doubleday bought paperback publisher Dell Publishing. In 1980, the company bought the New York Mets baseball team. The Mets defeated the Boston Red Sox to win the World Series in 1986 in a seven-game contest. In 1981, Doubleday promoted James R. McLaughlin to the presidency of Dell Publishing.

Sales slowed in the early 1980s and earnings fell precipitously. Doubleday Jr., brought James McLaughlin over (from subsidiary Dell) to help streamline and downsize. McLaughlin went on to succeed Doubleday Jr., as president and CEO, with Doubleday Jr., becoming chairman of the board.

By 1986, the firm was a fully integrated international communications company, doing trade publishing, mass-market paperback publishing, book clubs, and book manufacturing, together with ventures in broadcasting and advertising. The company had offices in London and Paris and wholly owned subsidiaries in Canada, Australia, and New Zealand, with joint ventures in the UK and the Netherlands. Nelson Doubleday Jr. sold the publishing company to Bertelsmann in 1986 for a reported $475 million, with James R. McLaughlin resigning on December 17, 1986. After the purchase, Bertelsmann sold Laidlaw to Macmillan Inc.

The sale of Doubleday to Bertelsmann did not include the Mets, which Nelson Doubleday and minority owner Fred Wilpon had purchased from Doubleday & Company for $85 million. In 2002, Doubleday sold his stake in the Mets to Wilpon for $135 million after a feud over the monetary value of the team.

In 1988, portions of the firm became part of the Bantam Doubleday Dell Publishing Group, which in turn became a division of Random House in 1998. Doubleday was combined in a group with Broadway Books, Anchor Books was combined with Vintage Books as a division of Knopf, while Bantam and Dell became a separate group.

In 1996, Doubleday founded the Christian publisher WaterBrook Press.

=== 21st century ===
WaterBrook acquired Harold Shaw Publishers in 2000 and Multnomah Publishers in 2006.

In late 2008 and early 2009, Doubleday imprint merged with Knopf Publishing Group to form the Knopf Doubleday Publishing Group. In October 2008, Doubleday laid off about 10% of its staff (16 people) across all departments. That December, the Broadway, Doubleday Business, Doubleday Religion, and WaterBrook Multnomah divisions were moved to Crown Publishing Group, a subsidiary of Random House in Manhattan.

== Presidents ==
- Frank Doubleday, founder, 1897–1922
- Nelson Doubleday, 1922–1946
- Douglas Black, 1946–1963
- John Turner Sargent Sr., 1963–1978
- Nelson Doubleday Jr., 1978–1983
- James R. McLaughlin, 1983–1986

== Editors ==
- May Massee, head of juvenile publishing from 1922 to 1932
- Jacqueline Kennedy Onassis, associate editor from 1978 to 1982 and senior editor from 1982 to 1994
- T. O'Conor Sloane III, senior editor from 1960 to 1977

== Authors ==
- Chinua Achebe
- Andre Agassi
- Felipe Alfau
- Isaac Asimov
- Margaret Atwood
- John Barth
- Evelyn Berckman
- Ray Bradbury
- Dan Brown
- Bill Bryson
- Pat Conroy
- Philip K. Dick
- Theodore Dreiser
- Daphne du Maurier
- Jennifer Egan
- Raymond E. Feist
- Graeme Gibson
- Erving Goffman
- David Grann
- John Grisham
- Mark Haddon
- Arthur Hailey
- Alex Haley
- Noah Hawley
- Dolores Hitchens
- Laura Z. Hobson
- Lilly Singh
- Michael Jackson
- Carl Jung
- Michio Kaku
- Stephen King
- Rudyard Kipling
- Jon Krakauer
- Jonathan Lethem
- Alistair MacLean
- Peter Mayle
- Andy McNab
- Herman Melville
- Michael A. O'Donnell
- Kirby Page
- Chuck Palahniuk
- Vera Pavlova
- Harvey Pekar
- Terry Pratchett
- Christopher Reich
- Judith Rossner
- Thorne Smith
- Bill Strickland
- Paul Shaffer
- Una Lucy Silberrad
- Wallace Stegner
- Immanuel Velikovsky
- Jose Antonio Villarreal
- Colson Whitehead
- Jacqueline Wilson
- P. G. Wodehouse
- William H. Whyte
- Hanya Yanagihara

== Employees ==
- William Faulkner worked part-time at the Doubleday Bookstore in New York City in 1921.

== Imprints ==
The following imprints exist or have existed under Doubleday:

- Anchor Books (sometime as Anchor Doubleday), produced quality paperbacks for bookstores; named for the anchor that (along with a dolphin) forms Doubleday's colophon; later part of the Knopf Publishing Group's Vintage Anchor unit
- Best in Children's Books, a mail-order collection of original children's short story anthologies
- Blakiston Co., medical and scientific books. Sold in 1947 to McGraw-Hill
- Blue Ribbon Books, purchased in 1939 from Reynal & Hitchcock
- Book League of America, contemporary and world classic literature, purchased in 1936
- The Crime Club, active through much of the 20th century, publishing mystery and detective novels, most notably the Fu Manchu series by Sax Rohmer and the Saint series by Leslie Charteris
- Garden City Publishing Co., established as a separate firm by Nelson Doubleday, Garden City's books were primarily reprints of books first offered by Doubleday, printed from the original plates but on less expensive paper. It was named for the village of the same name on Long Island in which Doubleday was headquartered until 1986, and which still houses Bookspan, the direct marketer of general interest and specialty book clubs run by Doubleday Direct and Book of the Month Club holdings.
- Image Books, Catholic Books, moved to Crown Publishing Group
- Nan A. Talese/Doubleday, a literary imprint established in 1990. Talese, the imprint's publisher and editorial director, was a senior vice president of Doubleday.
- Permabooks, paperback division established in 1948
- Rimington & Hooper, high-quality limited editions
- Triangle Books, purchased in 1939 from Reynal & Hitchcock; sold inexpensive books through chain stores
- Zenith Books, aimed at African-American youths

== Bookstores ==
- Doubleday Bookstores were purchased by Barnes & Noble in 1990 and operated by B. Dalton.
