= Dasypoda delectabilis =

- Holotype (male) of Dasypoda delectabilis in lateral view

Scientific classification
- Kingdom: Animalia
- Phylum: Arthropoda
- Clade: Pancrustacea
- Class: Insecta
- Order: Hymenoptera
- Family: Melittidae
- Genus: Dasypoda
- Species: D. delectabilis

Binomial name
- Dasypoda delectabilis Ghisbain & Michez, 2023

Species of bee

Dasypoda delectabilis, the delightful pantaloon bee, is a species of solitary bee from the family Melittidae. It was described in 2023 based on a single male specimen caught in arid areas of south-eastern Iran.

== Description ==
Dasypoda delectabilis is a medium-size, solitary bee from the family Melittidae, a family of Hymenoptera comprising approximately 150 species worldwide. The only specimen of Dasypoda delectabilis known to date is the male holotype used to describe the species. The specimen was caught in xeric areas of the Sistan and Baluchestan province in south-eastern Iran. The female of the species is yet to be discovered. Nothing is known about the habitat and biology of the species, but the known specimen was caught flying in May.

== Taxonomy ==
The genus Dasypoda is traditionally divided into four subgenera: Dasypoda sensu stricto (the group of the widespread pantaloon bees Dasypoda hirtipes and Dasypoda morawitzi), Heterodasypoda (the species group of Dasypoda radchenkoi), Microdasypoda (the group of the small-sized Dasypoda crassicornis and Dasypoda schwarzi), and Megadasypoda (the subgenus of the large-sized pantaloon bees Dasypoda braccata and Dasypoda vulpecula). The morphology of the male of Dasypoda delectabilis is largely similar to other species belonging to the subgenus Heterodasypoda, which led the authors of the original description to place the species into this subgenus. The same authors however noted that the morphology of Dasypoda delectabilis is intriguing due to the presence of unexpected characters shared by representatives of the subgenus Dasypoda sensu stricto. The phylogenetic position of the species is currently unknown. After its description at the University of Mons, the holotype was sent to the Naturalis Biodiversity Center, in The Netherlands where it is now hosted.

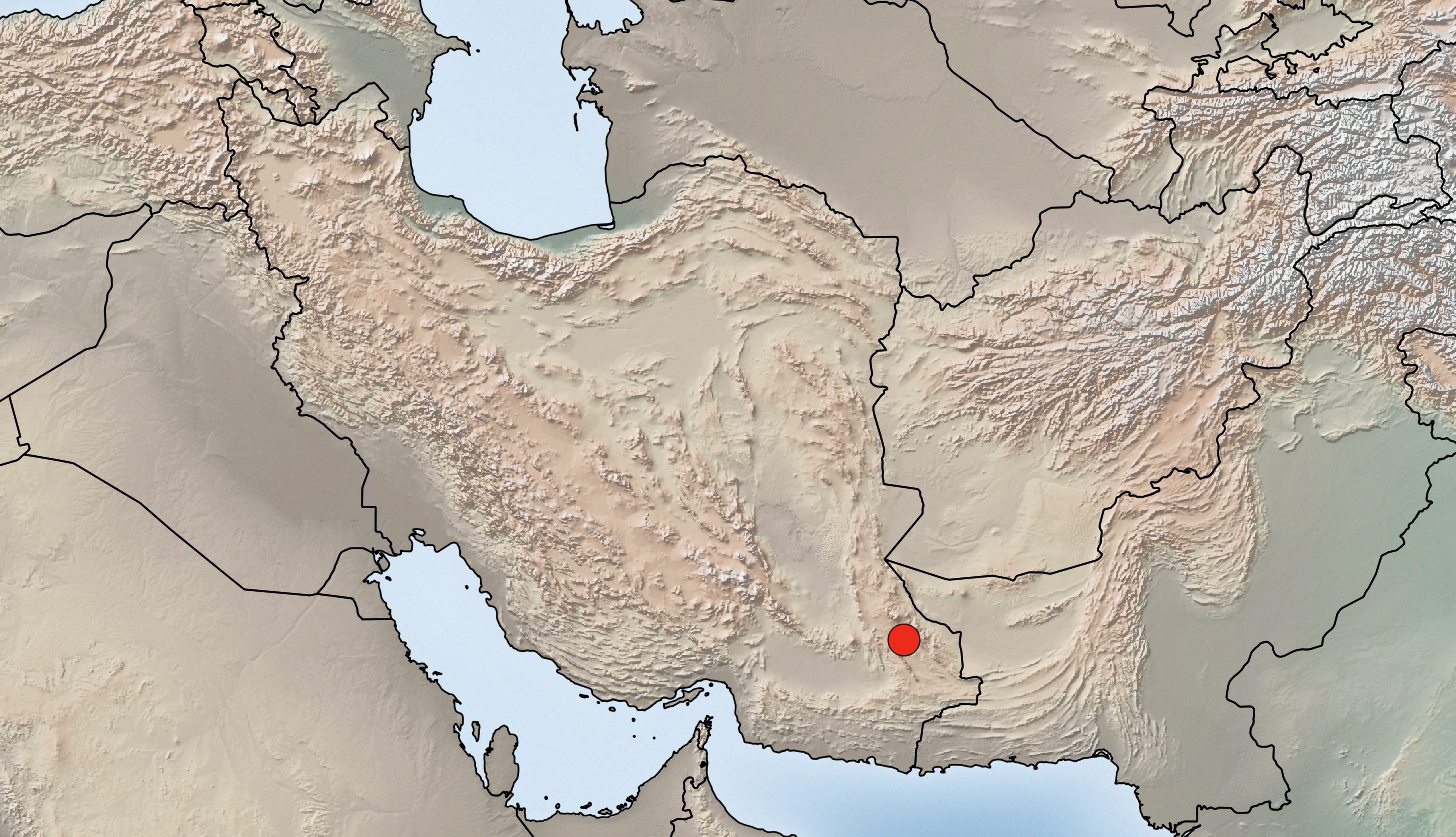
Currently known distribution of Dasypoda delectabilis (red dot)

== Etymology ==
The unique combination of morphological features (unknown in any other species) displayed by the male holotype led the authors of the description to name the species the delightful (in Latin delectabilis) pantaloon bee, as a reminder of the feeling of delight when observing the specimen for the first time.
