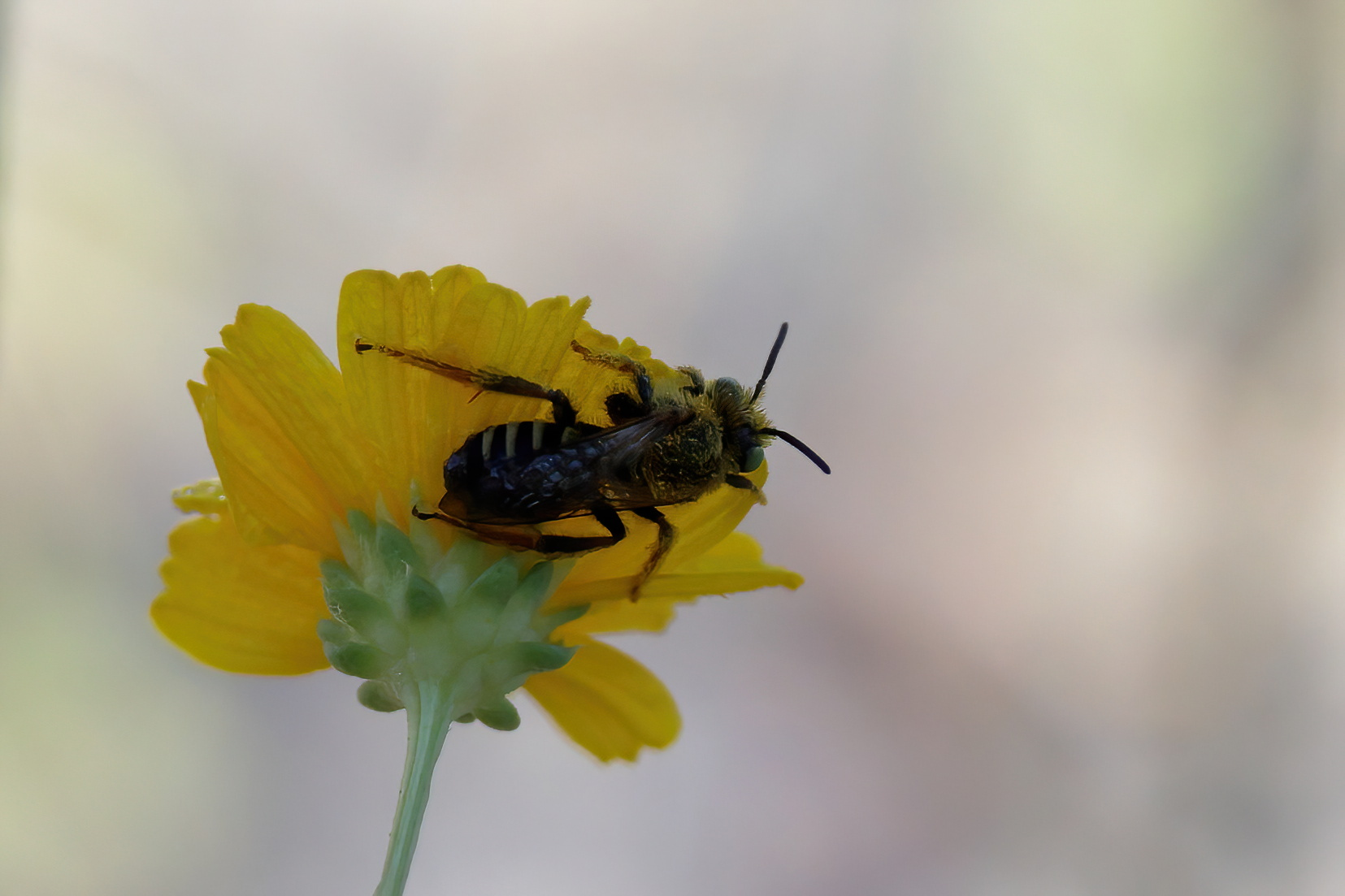

Conservation status
- Critically Imperiled (NatureServe)

Scientific classification
- Kingdom: Animalia
- Phylum: Arthropoda
- Class: Insecta
- Order: Hymenoptera
- Family: Melittidae
- Subfamily: Dasypodainae
- Genus: Hesperapis
- Species: H. oraria

Binomial name
- Hesperapis oraria Cane, Snelling, and Kervin, 1997

= Hesperapis oraria =

Species of bee

Hesperapis oraria, or Gulf Coast solitary bee is a rare species of bee in the family Melittidae. It was first described in 1997. The bee's current known range is on the barrier islands and coastal mainland secondary dunes on the Gulf Coast of the United States in Florida, Alabama, and Mississippi. The Gulf Coast solitary bee is the only known member of its subfamily in the eastern United States, and it is a monolege of the coastal plain honeycomb head (Balduina angustifolia).

== Taxonomy ==
Hesperapis oraria is a member of the insect order Hymenoptera, family Melittidae, subfamily Dasypodainae, tribe Hesperapini, genus Hesperapis, subgenus Carinapis, or the Carinata group.

== Etymology ==
The genus name Hesperapis is derived from the Latin words for “evening” and “bee”, and the specific epithet oraria is Latin meaning of the “coast or shore”.

== Description ==
The Gulf Coast solitary bee appears to be monolectic, only gathering pollen and nectar from one floral host, the coastal plain honeycomb head, Balduina angustifolia. Females of the Gulf Coast solitary bee are 11-13mm in length, while males are smaller at 8.5-11mm long; both sexes have shiny black heads with many hairs, plumose or hairy yellowish mesosomas with clear to brownish wings and hairy dark brown to reddish legs. Hairs on female metathoracic legs differ from males in a way that is thought to assist in nest construction in sand. Males can further be distinguished from females by their distinctive subtriangular pygidial plate that ends in a point, whereas female pygidial plates are broad with points greater than 45°. Overall, bodies of both sexes are covered in dense hairs and metasomas have alternating dark and light colored bands.

Melittidae is hypothesized to be the basal group of all bees, with the Dasypodainae the basal most branch in a recently constructed phylogeny. The genus Hesperapis is only found in xeric parts of South Africa and North America. The Gulf Coast solitary bee is the only known member of its genus, Hesperapis, and member of subfamily Dasypodainae found in eastern North America. There are other named 39 species found in xeric grasslands and deserts in western North America.

== Natural history ==
=== Life cycle and behavior ===
Adult Gulf Coast solitary bee activity coincides with the bloom of its pollen host, the coastal plain honeycomb head, in September and October. Gulf Coast solitary bees are thought to be univoltine, or produce one generation per year. In their few weeks as adults, female bees build underground nests and lay eggs after mating. Females provision a brood cell with a ball of pollen upon which one egg is laid and left to hatch and develop into likely five instars. The final larval stage enters diapause as a pre-pupa/post-defecating larvae before pupating and emerge as an adult.

Male Gulf Coast solitary bees often sleep on and patrol flowers of the honeycomb head for females and have been observed to attempt matings at the flowers; however as none of those observed mating attempts were successful, it is assumed that the majority of mating occurs at nest sites. Alternatively, patrolling males may have a low success rate and mating does indeed occur near host plants, such as at the base of the plants. Males also rest on flowers during severe weather. The activity of males on the flowers contributes to the bee's efficacy as a pollinator of the coastal plain honeycomb head.

While the nesting biology of the Gulf Coast solitary bee has not been specifically described, the 14 members of the Carinata group (subgenus of Hesperapis) have nests associated with soft sand, such as on dunes. Female Gulf Coast solitary bees have modified hind basitarsi setae that form a trough-like depression used to excavate nests in sandy soils. Other members of the subgenus have been found to nest in aggregate, with upwards of 25 burrows/m^{2} in the sandy soil and each burrow housing one to six individual larval cells within a 30 cm radius and around 25–30 cm deep. Larval cells of Hesperapis are not lined by the female and the larvae do not spin cocoons; however, post-defecating larvae have been found to be coated in a rigid integument-like material that may regulate moisture.

The Gulf Coast solitary bee may exhibit bet hedging, or a reproductive strategy that reduces between year variance in reproductive success and increases overall survival in ecosystems with unpredictable annual weather conditions. In response to unpredictable habitat, bees often enter extended diapause for two or three years, delaying emergence until blooms of their host plants. Monolectic bees do not switch pollen sources if they emerge when their host plant is not in bloom and so have evolved synchrony in emergence time with the blooming period of the plants, using environmental cues for emergence. At least one congener, Hesperapis rhodocerata, has been shown to exhibit extended diapause, not emerging until sufficient rainfall resulted in blooms of the preferred pollen host.

=== Habitat ===
When described, the Gulf Coast solitary bee was only found on secondary dunes behind fore dunes on barrier islands and coastal shores within 2–3 km from the shoreline, but it is now known only within 500m from the shoreline. Barrier islands in the Gulf of Mexico are long and narrow bands of sand that run parallel to the shore from two miles west of Alabama to Destin, Florida in the east. The islands and coastal areas consist of foredunes that break waves coming off of the Gulf and secondary dunes behind foredunes, with grasslands and temporary wetlands in the swales; on wider sections of the islands, such as on Perdido Key, the vegetation in the secondary dunes becomes wood scrub forest.

As the Gulf Coast solitary bee is monolectic and does not switch host plants, its habitat must consist of both dense patches of its sole pollen host, the Coastal Plain honeycombhead, as well as appropriate nesting substrate within flight range of the plants. The Gulf Coast solitary bee use patches of the honeycombhead less than 475m from the coastline and, as the plant prefers habitat greater than 110m from the shore, the bee can most likely be found between 110-475m from the Gulf coastline. On a regional scale, the bee requires at least 12 patches of the honeycombhead per site and on a landscape scale requires the area of the patches be at least 111.5m^{2}, or at least 2.5 plants per m^{2}. In 2011–2012, the bee was found in higher densities on the coastal mainland sites which had three times the number of honeycomb head patches compared to the barrier islands. The bee is not found at stands of honeycomb head on non-coastal mainland sites even those with dense patches of the honeycomb head.

As the Gulf Coast solitary bee's range is much smaller than the honeycomb head, its habitat is restricted by several other factors, most likely bare areas of fine sandy soil for nesting as well as the intermediate disturbances needed to maintain the bee's dune habitat. Dune habitat is dynamic and disturbance dependent and so constantly changing due to forces of wind, water, storms, and fire, which has led to naturally patchy distribution of the honeycomb head and other vegetation on the dune ecosystem. The bee and plant are found in higher densities on the coastal mainland sites, potentially due to reduced high intensity storm disturbance in these areas. In addition, low intensity fires are a common and natural component of these ecosystems that maintains bare ground and patchy vegetation. The bee's coastal and island habitats are separated from the non-coastal mainland patches of honeycomb head by development or dense scrubland that has built up due to suppression of natural fire, reducing habitat connectivity. As such, the Gulf Coast solitary bee and its host plant appear to require a moderate level of disturbance in their naturally shifting dune habitats.

Nests of the Gulf Coast solitary bees are in the deep, soft sandy soils found in their dune habitats, are potentially no more than 2 km from the shore, as they are restricted to the crumbly sands in back-dune habitats; although considering where the adult bees are found, the nests are more likely around 500m from the gulf shore. Nesting resources are key factors in solitary bee population viability; however, Gulf Coast solitary bee nests are difficult to locate and proxy measurements of fine sandy soil with bare ground and host plant proximity can be used to quantify nesting site availability and habitat quality. Indeed, a Gulf Coast solitary female has been recorded digging a burrow in fine sand within the largest patch of honeycomb head in the area on Fort Pickens.

== Historic and current distribution ==
The Gulf Coast solitary bee is narrowly distributed and its historic known range is a narrow strip along the northern shore of the Gulf of Mexico and extends linearly around 320 km from Horn Island in eastern Mississippi to St. Andrew's Bay in northwestern Florida within the states of Florida, Alabama, and Mississippi. Despite extensive surveys for the bee throughout the region, even within dense patches of its host plant, the coastal plains honeycomb head, which also occur in the Florida peninsula and southern Georgia, the bee was only found in sites within 1–2 km of the coast in 1996, when it was described. Further, the Gulf Coast solitary bee was not found on small barrier islands containing its host plant, such as Petit Bois Island in Mississippi, nor on islands or areas without the honeycomb head (Dauphin Island, Alabama and Crooked Islands, and Shell Islands, Florida). The Gulf Coast solitary bee has not been surveyed outside of Florida since the original description, and thus has not been seen in Mississippi or Alabama since 1994.

== Conservation ==
The Gulf Coast solitary bee has been recognized as imperiled or needing protection by international and state entities. It has a NatureServe ranking of G1 or critically imperiled from 2007 and all known occurrences may be in danger from development and hurricanes. According to NatureServe, as of 2007, the bee is extirpated or likely extirpated from Choctawhatchee Bay and Pensacola Bay (NatureServe 2018 p. 2). The Gulf Coast solitary bee is state ranked as S1/S2, or critically imperiled/imperiled in Florida because of extreme rarity or vulnerability to extinction due to some natural or man-made factor by the Florida Natural Areas Inventory; however, it is not listed as a Florida Endangered Species or Species of Special Concern so is not formally protected by the state of Florida. It has no federal endangered species protection. It was petitioned for federal endangered species act protections in 2019.
