= Hesperapis rufipes =

Scientific classification
- Domain: Eukaryota
- Kingdom: Animalia
- Phylum: Arthropoda
- Class: Insecta
- Order: Hymenoptera
- Family: Melittidae
- Subfamily: Dasypodainae
- Genus: Hesperapis
- Species: H. rufipes

Binomial name
- Hesperapis rufipes (Ashmead, 1899)

Species of bee

Hesperapis rufipes is a species of hairy-footed bee in the family Melittidae. It is found in North America.
