= Rediviva albifasciata =

Scientific classification
- Domain: Eukaryota
- Kingdom: Animalia
- Phylum: Arthropoda
- Class: Insecta
- Order: Hymenoptera
- Family: Melittidae
- Genus: Rediviva
- Species: R. albifasciata

Binomial name
- Rediviva albifasciata Friese, 1911

Species of bee

Rediviva albifasciata is a species of oil-collecting bee in the Rediviva genus and Melittidae family endemic to South Africa. It is the smallest of all Rediviva species.

== Characteristics ==
The distribution of Rediviva albifasciata is strongly congruent with the distribution of the plant Colpias mollis. Its size allows it to collect oil from C. mollis flowers much more easily than other bees, such as R. bicava and R. parva.

The forelegs of R. albifasciata are covered in blade-like hairs ventrally that allow it to collect and rupture elaiophores from C. mollis.
