= Dasypoda radchenkoi =

- Male paratype of Dasypoda radchenkoi

Conservation status
- Data Deficient (IUCN 3.1)

Scientific classification
- Kingdom: Animalia
- Phylum: Arthropoda
- Clade: Pancrustacea
- Class: Insecta
- Order: Hymenoptera
- Family: Melittidae
- Genus: Dasypoda
- Species: D. radchenkoi

Binomial name
- Dasypoda radchenkoi Ghisbain & Wood, 2023

Species of bee

Dasypoda radchenkoi, also known as Radchenko's pantaloon bee, is a species of solitary bee from the family Melittidae. It was described in 2023 in the scientific journal Osmia based on specimens caught in the limestone areas of southern Spain.

== Description ==
Dasypoda radchenkoi is a medium-size, solitary Hymenoptera from the species-poor family Melittidae, a wild bee family comprising approximately 150 species globally. The species is near cryptic with the Iberian pantaloon bee Dasypoda morotei, which means that the morphology is both species is highly similar and hardly allows their differentiation. Although tiny morphological features allow to distinguish the females of both species, males remain unidentifiable based on visual examination only. The discovery of Dasypoda radchenkoi as a separate species was initially fortuitous via the genetic barcoding of two specimens, one being the holotype female and the other being a paratype male. The species is only known from the limestone mountains of southern Spain, from where it is thought to be endemic. The species flies in May and June and collects floral resources on plants of the genus Cistus (Cistaceae).

== Taxonomy ==
The genus Dasypoda is divided into four subgenera that allow the classification of most species globally: Dasypoda sensu stricto (the group of the common pantaloon bee Dasypoda hirtipes), Heterodasypoda (including the Iberian Dasypoda morotei), Microdasypoda (the group of small-sized pantaloon bee Dasypoda crassicornis) and Megadasypoda (the group of the large-sized pantaloon bees such as Dasypoda vulpecula). The morphology of Dasypoda radchenkoi is typical of the subgenus Heterodasypoda. The phylogenetic position of the species shows that it is the sister species of the near cryptic Dasypoda morotei, as it could be expected based on morphology alone. After the formal description if D. radchenkoi at the University of Mons, the holotype female was sent to the Museum of Linz, in Austria, where it now hosted. Some paratypes were sent to the Naturalis Biodiversity Center, in The Netherlands.

== Etymology ==
The species is dedicated to Prof. Vladimir G. Radchenko, worldwide authority on the ecology and taxonomy of bees, and head of the Department of General Biology at the National Academy of Sciences of Ukraine.

== Conservation ==
Based on the guidelines of the International Union for the Conservation of Nature, Dasypoda radchenkoi was assessed "Data Deficient" based on two arguments: no information about the possible threats to the species is known, and the complete distribution of the species is yet to be assessed. More surveys in southern Spain are necessary to understand more in detail the ecology and biogeography of the species.
