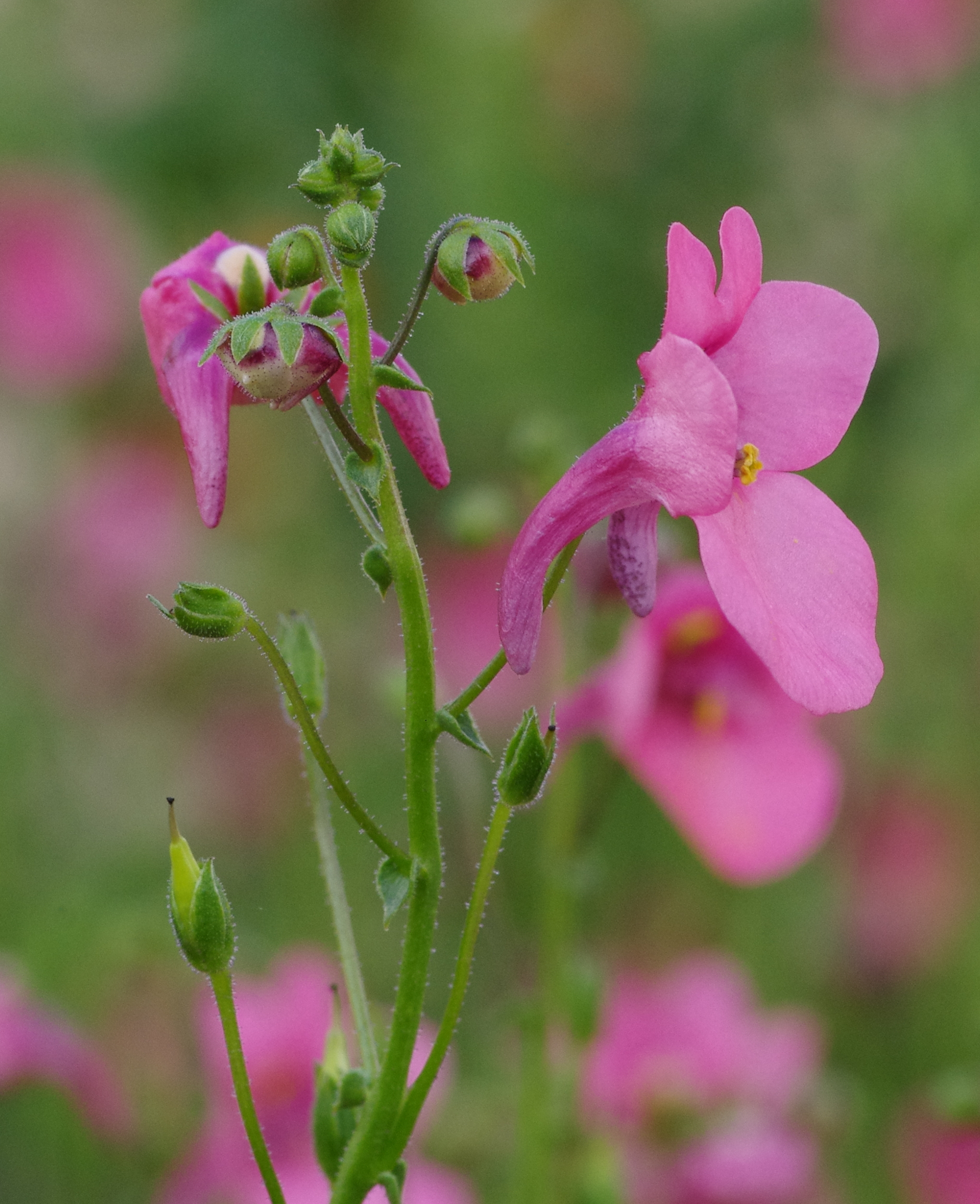
- Diascia barberae

Scientific classification
- Kingdom: Plantae
- Clade: Tracheophytes
- Clade: Angiosperms
- Clade: Eudicots
- Clade: Asterids
- Order: Lamiales
- Family: Scrophulariaceae
- Tribe: Hemimerideae
- Genus: Diascia; Link & Otto

Type species
- Diascia bergiana Link & Otto

Species
- See here

= Diascia (plant) =

Genus of flowering plants

Diascia is a genus of around 70 species of herbaceous annual and perennial flowering plants of the family Scrophulariaceae, native to southern Africa, including South Africa, Lesotho and neighbouring areas.

The perennial species are found mainly in summer-rainfall areas such as the KwaZulu-Natal Drakensberg; about 50 species, mostly annuals, are found in the Western Cape and Namaqualand, winter rainfall areas.

Their common name is twinspur, in reference to the two (usually downward-pointing) spurs to be found on the back of the flower. These help to distinguish them from the similar (and closely related) genera Alonsoa and Nemesia. The spurs contain a special oil, which is collected in the wild by bees of the genus Rediviva (e.g. R. longimanus) that appear to have coevolved with the plants, as they have unusually long forelegs for collecting the oil.

In gardens, Diascia cultivars (mostly hybrids) have become extremely popular as colourful, floriferous, easily grown bedding plants in recent years.

== Description ==
Most diascia species are short-growing, straggling plants, reaching no more than 30–45 centimetres (12–18 in) in height, although Diascia rigescens can reach 60 cm (24 in), and the rather similar D. personata (with which it is often confused) up to 120 cm (47 in) or so. Some Diascia species spread by means of stolons, while others produce multiple lax stems from a single crown. The flowers are borne in loose terminal racemes. The corolla is five-lobed, and normally pink or rose-coloured in the perennial species most commonly seen in cultivation. Dark purplish patches of oil glands may make the flowers of some species appear bicoloured.

== Taxonomy ==
It was described by Johann Heinrich Friedrich Link and Christoph Friedrich Otto in 1820 with Diascia bergiana Link & Otto as the type species. Within the family Scrophulariaceae it is placed in the tribe Hemimerideae.

=== Etymology ===
Surprisingly, the generic name (from the Greek di = two and askos = bag, pouch or sack) does not refer to the spurs, but to the two translucent sacs, or pouches, known as 'windows', found in the upper part of the corolla of the original type specimen, Diascia bergiana. Diascia species in the section Racemosae have similar windows, but in some species they merge into one. The windows may help oil-collecting bees to find the correct position within the corolla when gathering oil from the glands within the spurs.

=== Species ===
Around 60–70 species are currently recognised in the genus Diascia:

- Diascia aliciae Hiern
- Diascia alonzoides Benth.
- Diascia anastrepta Hilliard & B.L.Burtt
- Diascia ausana Dinter
- Diascia austromontana K.E.Steiner
- Diascia barberae Hook.f.
- Diascia batteniana K.E.Steiner
- Diascia bergiana Link & Otto
- Diascia bicolor K.E.Steiner
- Diascia capensis (L.) Britten
- Diascia capsularis Benth.
- Diascia cardiosepala Hiern
- Diascia cordata N.E.Br.
- Diascia cuneata E.Mey. ex Benth.
- Diascia decipiens K.E.Steiner
- Diascia dielsiana Schltr. ex Hiern
- Diascia diffusa Benth.
- Diascia dissecta Hiern
- Diascia dissimulans Hilliard & B.L.Burtt
- Diascia ellaphieae K.E.Steiner
- Diascia elongata Benth.
- Diascia engleri Diels
- Diascia esterhuyseniae K.E.Steiner
- Diascia fetcaniensis Hilliard & B.L.Burtt
- Diascia fragrans K.E.Steiner
- Diascia glandulosa E.Phillips
- Diascia gracilis Schltr.
- Diascia heterandra Benth.
- Diascia hexensis K.E.Steiner
- Diascia humilis K.E.Steiner
- Diascia insignis K.E.Steiner
- Diascia integerrima E.Mey. ex Benth.
- Diascia lewisiae K.E.Steiner
- Diascia lilacina Hilliard & B.L.Burtt
- Diascia longicornis (Thunb.) Druce
- Diascia macrophylla (Thunb.) Spreng.
- Diascia maculata K.E.Steiner
- Diascia megathura Hilliard & B.L.Burtt
- Diascia minutiflora Hiern
- Diascia mollis Hilliard & B.L.Burtt
- Diascia namaquensis Hiern
- Diascia nana Diels
- Diascia nodosa K.E.Steiner
- Diascia nutans Diels
- Diascia pachyceras E.Mey. ex Benth.
- Diascia parviflora Benth.
- Diascia patens (Thunb.) Grant ex Fourc.
- Diascia pentheri Schltr.
- Diascia personata Hilliard & B.L.Burtt
- Diascia purpurea N.E.Br.
- Diascia racemulosa Benth.
- Diascia ramosa Scott-Elliot
- Diascia rigescens E.Mey. ex Benth.
- Diascia rudolphii Hiern
- Diascia runcinata E.Mey. ex Benth.
- Diascia sacculata Benth.
- Diascia scullyi Hiern
- Diascia stachyoides Schltr. ex Hiern
- Diascia stricta Hilliard & B.L.Burtt
- Diascia tanyceras E.Mey. ex Benth.
- Diascia tugelensis Hilliard & B.L.Burtt
- Diascia unilabiata (Thunb.) Benth.
- Diascia veronicoides Schltr.
- Diascia vigilis Hilliard & B.L.Burtt

== Coevolution with Rediviva bees ==
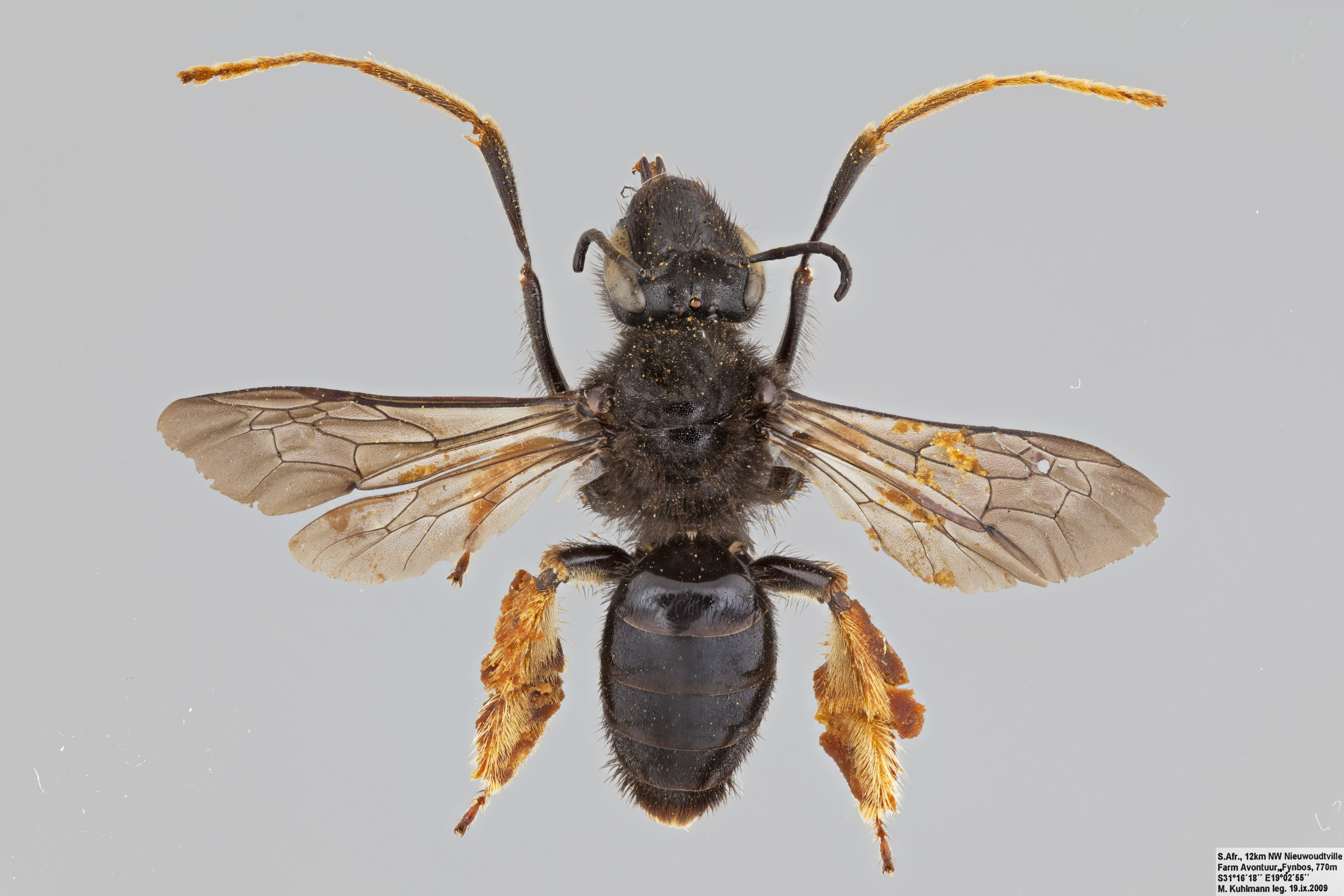
Female Rediviva longimanus bee with elongate front legs

The two spurs found on the back of a Diascia flower (from which it gets the common name twinspur) contain a special oil, which is collected in the wild by at least 8 species of bees of the genus Rediviva. The bees appear to have coevolved with the plants, as the females have developed unusually long, hairy forelegs with which they collect the oil from Diascia spurs to feed their larvae (and sometimes to line their nests with). The spurs vary in average length from 5.3 millimetres (0.21 in) to as much as 13.9 mm (0.55 in), mainly between species (although those of D. capsularis can vary widely between populations); the bees' forelegs vary similarly. The spurs of Diascia longicornis are about 25 mm (0.98 in) in length, but the existence of a suitably equipped pollinator, Rediviva emdeorum, with forelegs of the same length, was only confirmed in the 1980s. Rediviva longimanus has also been observed pollinating D. longicornis in the Western Cape.

Rediviva neliana, a widespread species, collects from at least 12 species of Diascia, but in general, few different Diascia species grow together in the same locality. As a result, local populations of R. neliana have been found to differ from each other, as each has developed legs that match the spur length of the diascias that are available to them in that locality. This indicates that local populations of R. neliana are coevolving with the flowers on which they depend.

== Garden uses ==
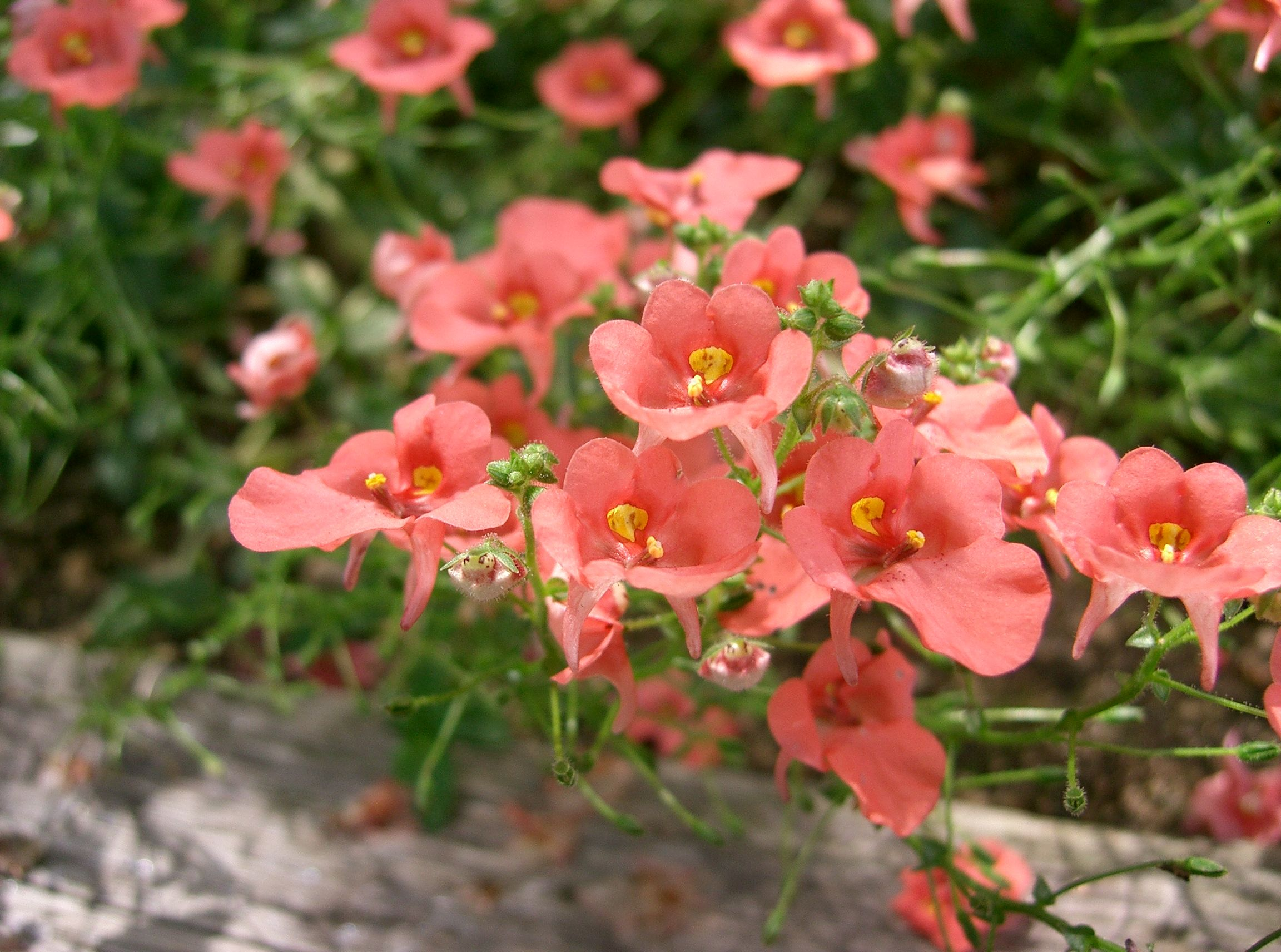
'Coral Belle', a cultivar used for summer bedding

Diascia cultivars have become extremely popular worldwide as bedding plants, suitable for hanging baskets, window boxes and other containers, as well as rockeries and the fronts of herbaceous borders. This explosion of interest is largely thanks to the breeding work done by the late Hector Harrison of Appleby, North Lincolnshire, England. From 1985, he raised hundreds of hybrid seedlings, from which several excellent cultivars have been selected and named. He increased the colour range to include shades of apricot, pink, coral, lilac, red and white. Other nurseries and breeders have continued to build on his pioneering work.

Several species and cultivars have been given the Award of Garden Merit by the British Royal Horticultural Society. The AGM includes a hardiness rating: most have been rated as intermediate between H3 (hardy outside in some regions or particular situations or which, while usually grown outside in summer, needs frost-free protection in winter – e.g. dahlias) and H4 (hardy throughout the British Isles).

=== Cultivars ===
The species and cultivars commonly grown in gardens include the following (those awarded the Royal Horticultural Society's Award of Garden Merit are marked agm):

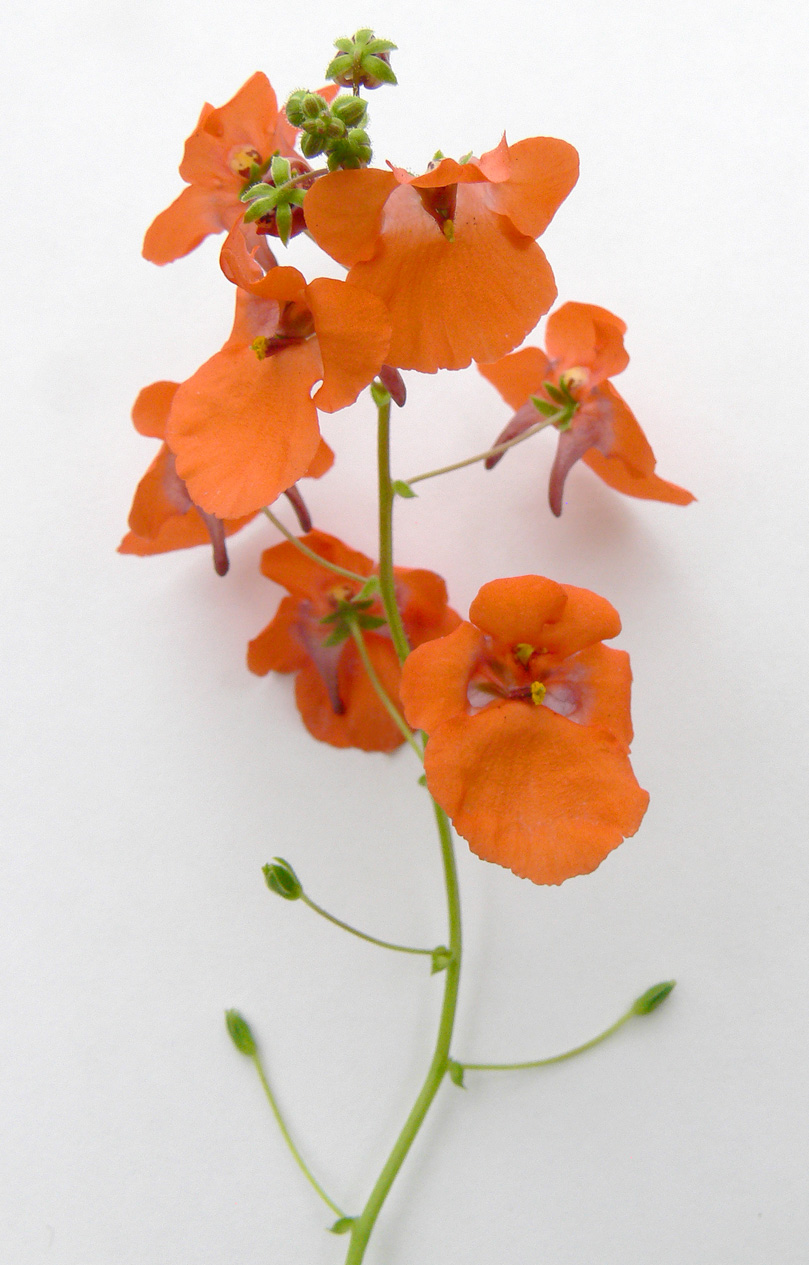
A raceme of Diascia 'Little Tango', a hybrid cultivar. The spurs on the back of the corolla can be seen

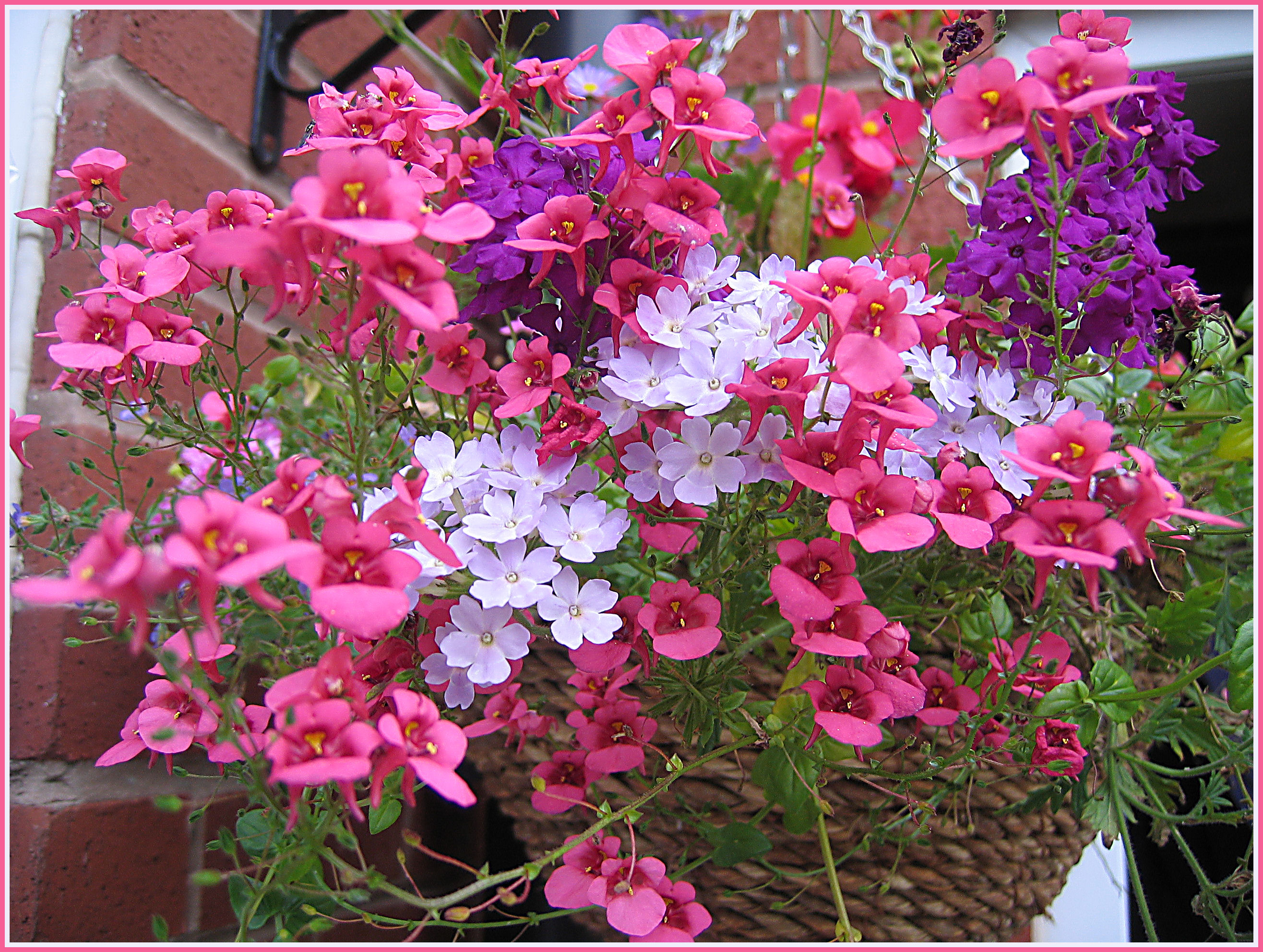
Floral basket with diascia

- 'Appleby Apricot'
- D. barberae:
  - 'Belmore Beauty'
  - 'Blackthorn Apricot' agm H3-4
  - 'Fisher's Flora' agm
  - 'Ruby Field' agm H3–4
- 'Blue Bonnet'
- Coral Belle='Hecbel' agm H3–4
- 'Dark Eyes' agm
- 'Elizabeth' agm
- D. fetcaniensis
- Flying Colours Series
  - 'Flying Colours Appleblossom'
  - 'Flying Colours Apricot'
  - 'Flying Colours Coral'
  - 'Flying Colours Red'
- 'Ice Cracker'
- 'Ice Cream'
- D. integerrima agm
- 'Jacqueline's Joy'
- 'Joyce's Choice' agm H3–4
- 'Katherine Sharman'
- 'Lady Valerie' agm H3–4
- 'Lilac Belle' agm H3–4
- 'Lilac Mist' agm H3–4
- 'Little Dancer'
- 'Little Tango'
- 'Pink Panther'
- 'Red Ace'
- 'Redstart'
- D. rigescens agm
- 'Rupert Lambert' agm H3–4
- 'Salmon Supreme'
- 'Twinkle' agm
- D. vigilis agm
- Whisper Series
  - 'Whisper Apricot Improved'
  - 'Whisper Cranberry Red'
  - 'Whisper Pumpkin'
  - 'Whisper Tangerine'
  - 'Whisper White'
- Wink Series
  - 'Wink Garnet'
