= Hesperapis larreae =

Scientific classification
- Kingdom: Animalia
- Phylum: Arthropoda
- Clade: Pancrustacea
- Class: Insecta
- Order: Hymenoptera
- Family: Melittidae
- Genus: Hesperapis
- Species: H. larreae

Binomial name
- Hesperapis larreae Cockerell, 1907

Species of insect

Hesperapis larreae is a solitary species of ground-nesting bee in the family Melittidae.
