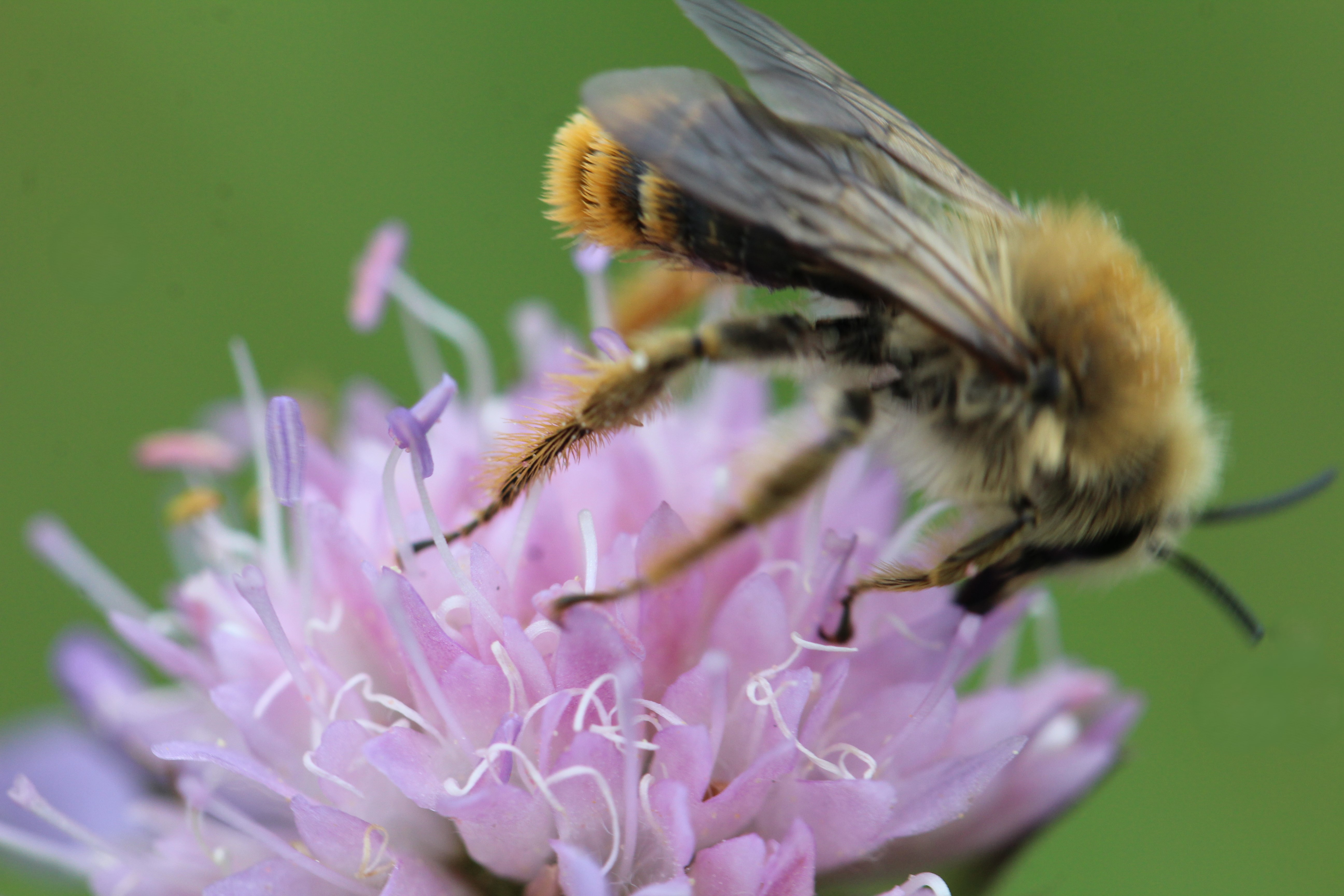

Conservation status
- Vulnerable (IUCN 3.1) (Europe regional assessment)

Scientific classification
- Kingdom: Animalia
- Phylum: Arthropoda
- Clade: Pancrustacea
- Class: Insecta
- Order: Hymenoptera
- Family: Melittidae
- Genus: Dasypoda
- Species: D. argentata

Binomial name
- Dasypoda argentata Panzer, 1808

= Dasypoda argentata =

Species of bee

Dasypoda argentata is a species of bee in the family Melittidae.

It is native to Europe.
