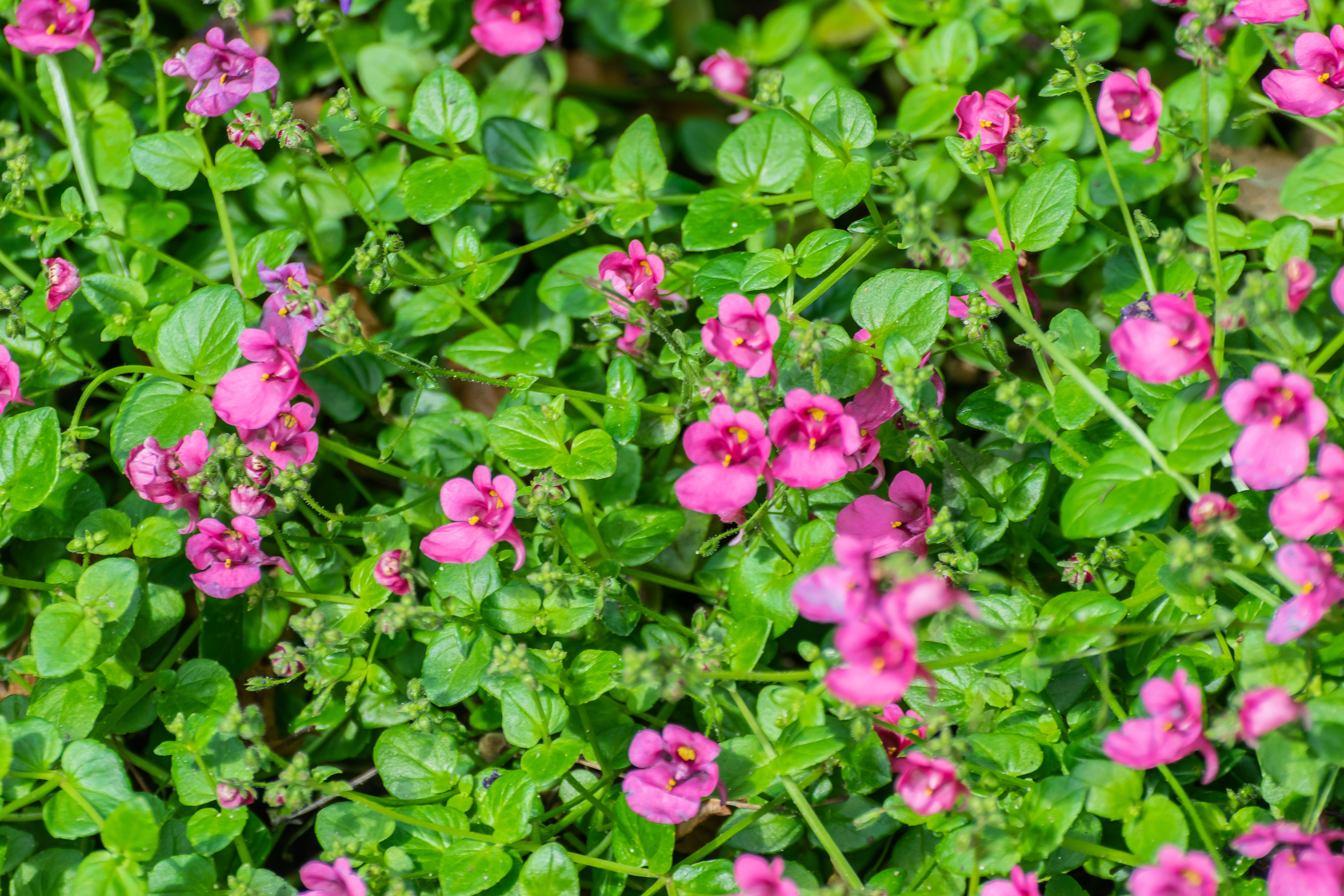
- At the Botanischer Garten Münster
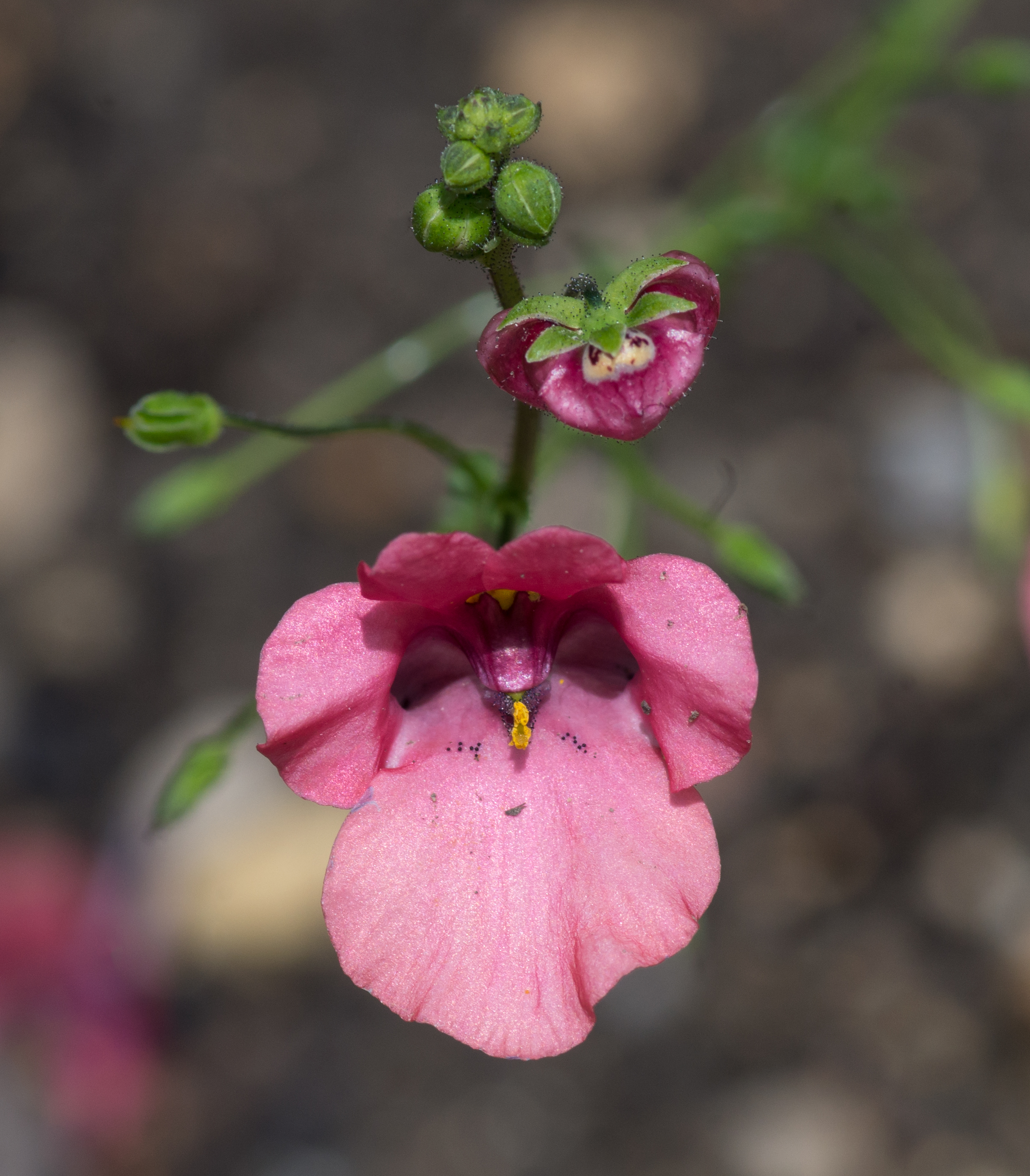
- Close-up of flower

Scientific classification
- Kingdom: Plantae
- Clade: Embryophytes
- Clade: Tracheophytes
- Clade: Angiosperms
- Clade: Eudicots
- Clade: Asterids
- Order: Lamiales
- Family: Scrophulariaceae
- Genus: Diascia
- Species: D. vigilis

Binomial name
- Diascia vigilis Hilliard & B.L.Burtt

= Diascia vigilis =

Species of flowering plant

Diascia vigilis, called the twinspur or elf spur, is a species of flowering plant in the genus Diascia, native to South Africa. It has gained the Royal Horticultural Society's Award of Garden Merit.
