= Hesperapis =

Scientific classification
- Kingdom: Animalia
- Phylum: Arthropoda
- Class: Insecta
- Order: Hymenoptera
- Family: Melittidae
- Subfamily: Dasypodainae
- Genus: Hesperapis; Cockerell, 1898

Genus of bees

Hesperapis is a genus of bees in the family Melittidae. There are at least 30 described species in Hesperapis. The genus is very uncommon. Its abdomen is flattened and its integument or "skin" is soft compared to other groups of bees.

== Behavior ==
One species, Hesperapis rhodocerata, was recorded in one area in 2010 and 2015, appearing in those years but not the years in between. This suggests that their diapause may be prolonged over multiple years.

== Species ==
These 37 species belong to the genus Hesperapis:

- Hesperapis aliciae (Cockerell, 1932)^{i c g}
- Hesperapis arenicola Crawford, 1917^{i c g}
- Hesperapis arida Michener, 1936^{i c g}
- Hesperapis braunsiana (Friese, 1911)^{i c g}
- Hesperapis carinata Stevens, 1919^{i c g}
- Hesperapis danforthi (Eardley, 2007)^{i c g}
- Hesperapis elegantula Cockerell, 1898^{i c g}
- Hesperapis eumarpha (Cockerell, 1898)^{i c g}
- Hesperapis flavicara (Eardley, 2007)^{i c g}
- Hesperapis flavitarsis (Friese, 1912)^{i c g}
- Hesperapis fuchsi (Viereck, 1909)^{i c g}
- Hesperapis fulvipes Crawford, 1917^{i c g}
- Hesperapis gessorum (Eardley, 2007)^{i c g}
- Hesperapis hantamensis (Michez & Kuhlmann, 2007)^{i c g}
- Hesperapis ilicifoliae (Cockerell, 1910)^{i c g}
- Hesperapis larreae Cockerell, 1907^{i c g}
- Hesperapis laticeps Crawford, 1917^{i c g}
- Hesperapis leucura Cockerell, 1916^{i c g}
- Hesperapis macrocephala Cockerell, 1924^{i c g}
- Hesperapis micheneri (Michez, 2007)^{i c g}
- Hesperapis nanula (Cockerell, 1936)^{i c g}
- Hesperapis nigerrima (Cockerell, 1932)^{i c g}
- Hesperapis nitidula Cockerell, 1916^{i c g}
- Hesperapis oliviae (Cockerell, 1897)^{i c g}
- Hesperapis oraria Snelling & Stage, 1997^{i c g b}
- Hesperapis parva Michener, 1937^{i c g}
- Hesperapis pellucida Cockerell, 1925^{i c g}
- Hesperapis regularis (Cresson, 1878)^{i c g b}
- Hesperapis rhodocerata (Cockerell, 1897)^{i c g}
- Hesperapis rhodostoma (Cockerell, 1932)^{i c g}
- Hesperapis richtersveldensis (Patiny & Michez, 2007)^{i c g}
- Hesperapis rodecki Cockerell, 1934^{i c g}
- Hesperapis rufipes (Ashmead, 1899)^{i c g b}
- Hesperapis rufiventris (Friese, 1912)^{i c g}
- Hesperapis semirudis Cockerell, 1910^{i c g}
- Hesperapis trochanterata Snelling, 1987^{i c g}
- Hesperapis wilmattae Cockerell, 1933^{i c g}

Data sources: i = ITIS, c = Catalogue of Life, g = GBIF, b = Bugguide.net
