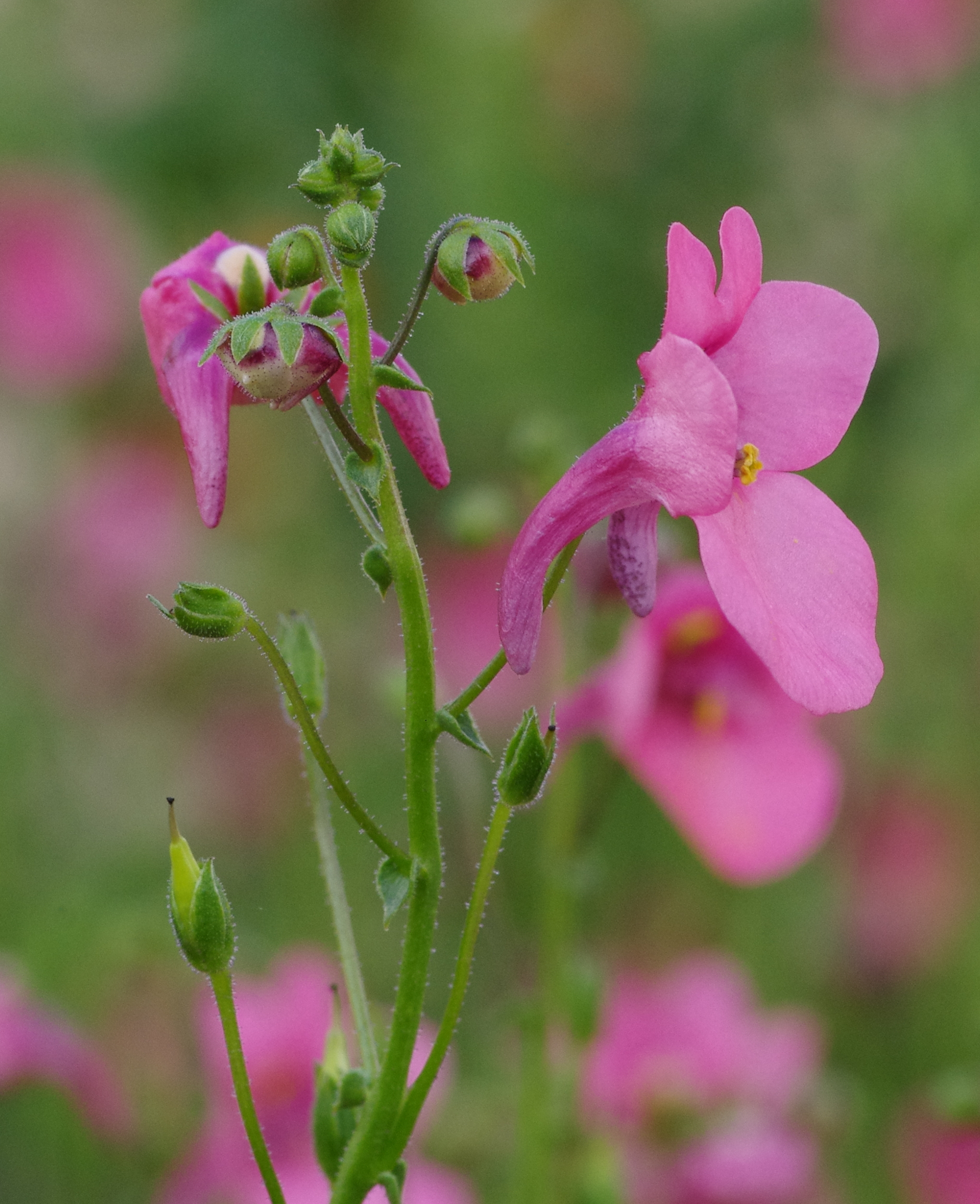
- Flowers
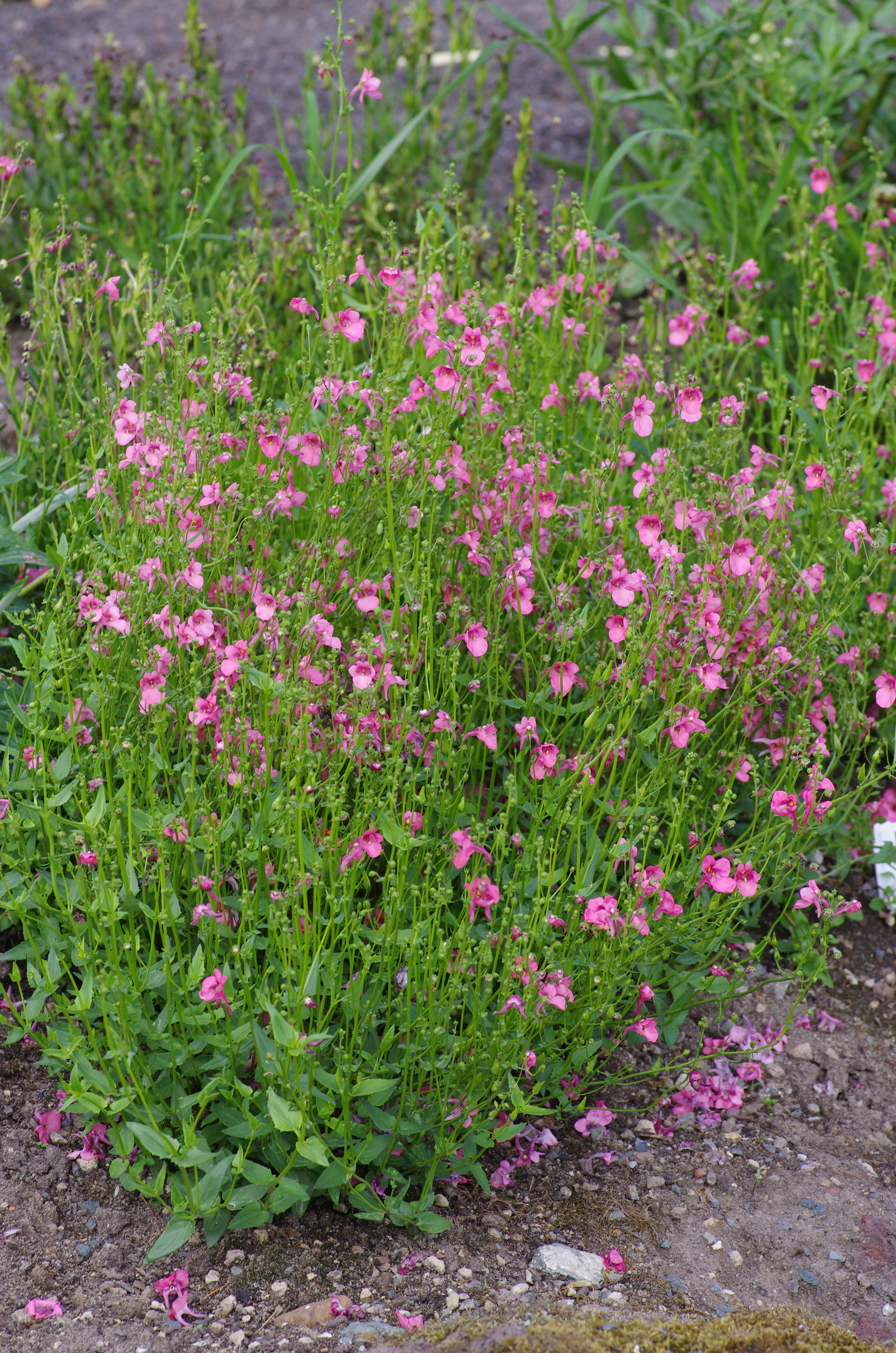
- Habit

Scientific classification
- Kingdom: Plantae
- Clade: Embryophytes
- Clade: Tracheophytes
- Clade: Angiosperms
- Clade: Eudicots
- Clade: Asterids
- Order: Lamiales
- Family: Scrophulariaceae
- Genus: Diascia
- Species: D. barberae

Binomial name
- Diascia barberae Hook.f.

= Diascia barberae =

Species of flowering plant

Diascia barberae, called twinspur along with other members of its genus, is a species of flowering plant in the family Scrophulariaceae, native to South Africa and Lesotho. Its cultivar 'Blackthorn Apricot' has gained the Royal Horticultural Society's Award of Garden Merit. Many other cultivars that vary largely by the color of their flowers are available, including 'Ruby Field', 'Lilac Belle' and 'Rupert Lambert'.
