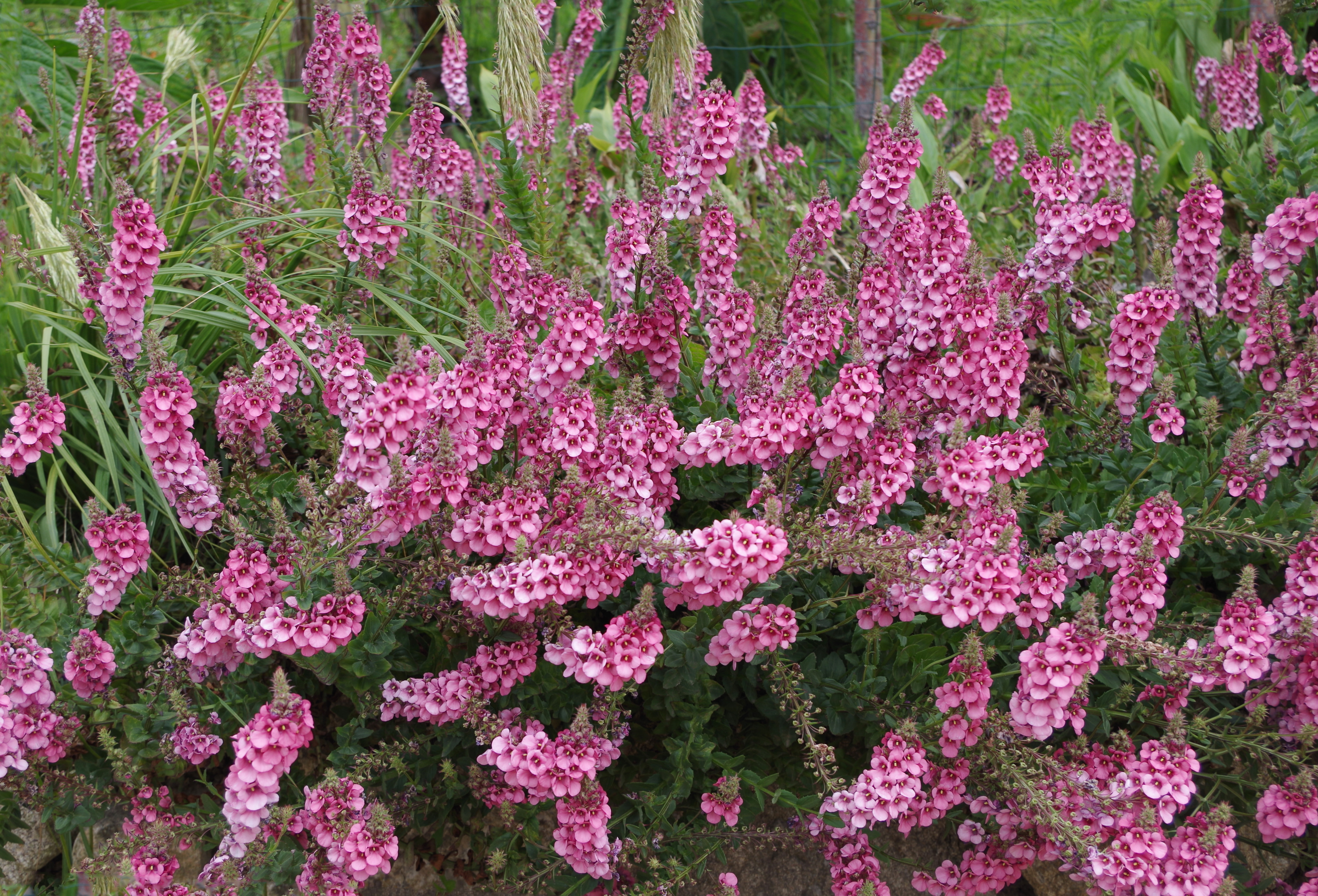
- In the Jardin Exotique de Roscoff

Scientific classification
- Kingdom: Plantae
- Clade: Embryophytes
- Clade: Tracheophytes
- Clade: Angiosperms
- Clade: Eudicots
- Clade: Asterids
- Order: Lamiales
- Family: Scrophulariaceae
- Genus: Diascia
- Species: D. rigescens

Binomial name
- Diascia rigescens E.Mey. ex Benth.

Synonyms
- Diascia macowanii Hiern

= Diascia rigescens =

Species of flowering plant

Diascia rigescens, called the stiff twinspur, is a species of flowering plant in the genus Diascia, native to the Eastern Cape and southern KwaZulu-Natal provinces of South Africa. It has gained the Royal Horticultural Society's Award of Garden Merit.
