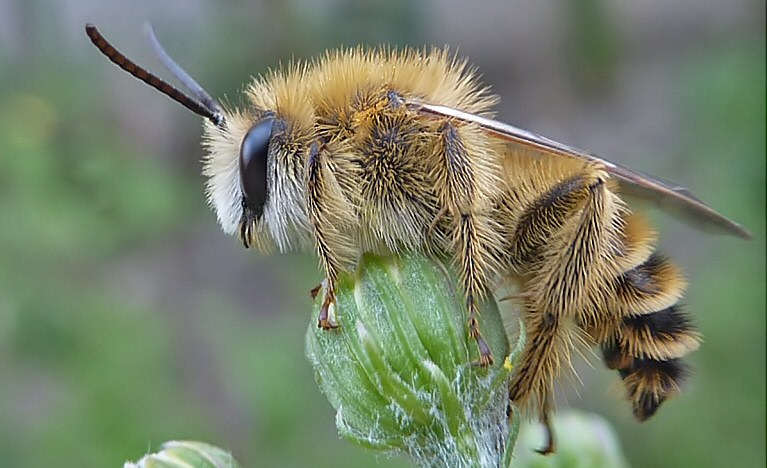
- Dasypoda hirtipes (male)

Scientific classification
- Domain: Eukaryota
- Kingdom: Animalia
- Phylum: Arthropoda
- Class: Insecta
- Order: Hymenoptera
- Family: Melittidae
- Subfamily: Dasypodainae
- Genus: Dasypoda

Species
- See text

= Dasypoda =

Genus of bees

Dasypoda is a genus of bees in the family Melittidae.

== Species ==
- Dasypoda albimana Pérez, 1905
- Dasypoda albipila Spinola, 1838
- Dasypoda altercator (Harris 1780)
- Dasypoda argentata Panzer 1809
- Dasypoda aurata Rudow, 1881
- Dasypoda braccata Eversmann 1852
- Dasypoda brevicornis Pérez, 1895
- Dasypoda chinensis Wu, 1978
- Dasypoda cingulata Erichson 1835
- Dasypoda cockerelli Yasumatsu, 1935
- Dasypoda comberi Cockerell 1911
- Dasypoda crassicornis Friese, 1896
- Dasypoda delectabilis Ghisbain & Michez, 2023
- Dasypoda dusmeti Quilis 1928
- Dasypoda frieseana Schletterer, 1890
- Dasypoda gusenleitneri Michez 2004
- Dasypoda heliocharis Gistel 1857
- Dasypoda hirtipes Fabricius, 1793
- Dasypoda iberica Warncke, 1973
- Dasypoda intermedia Michez, 2005
- Dasypoda japonica Cockerell, 1911
- Dasypoda leucoura Rudow, 1882
- Dasypoda litigator Baker, 2002
- Dasypoda longigena Schletterer, 1890
- Dasypoda maura Pérez, 1895
- Dasypoda michezi Radchenko, 2017
- Dasypoda morawitzi Radchenko, 2016
- Dasypoda morotei Quilis, 1928
- Dasypoda oraniensis Pérez, 1895
- Dasypoda patinyi Michez, 2002
- Dasypoda pyriformis Radoszkowski, 1887
- Dasypoda pyrotrichia Förster, 1855
- Dasypoda radchenkoi Ghisbain & Wood, 2023
- Dasypoda rudis Gistel 1857
- Dasypoda schwarzi Radchenko & Michez, 2022
- Dasypoda sichuanensis Wu, 2000
- Dasypoda sinuata Pérez, 1895
- Dasypoda spinigera Kohl 1905
- Dasypoda syriensis Michez 2004
- Dasypoda tibialis Morawitz, 1880
- Dasypoda toroki Michez 2004
- Dasypoda tubera Warncke 1973
- Dasypoda visnaga (Rossi, 1790)
- Dasypoda vulpecula Lebedev, 1929
- Dasypoda warnckei Michez 2004
