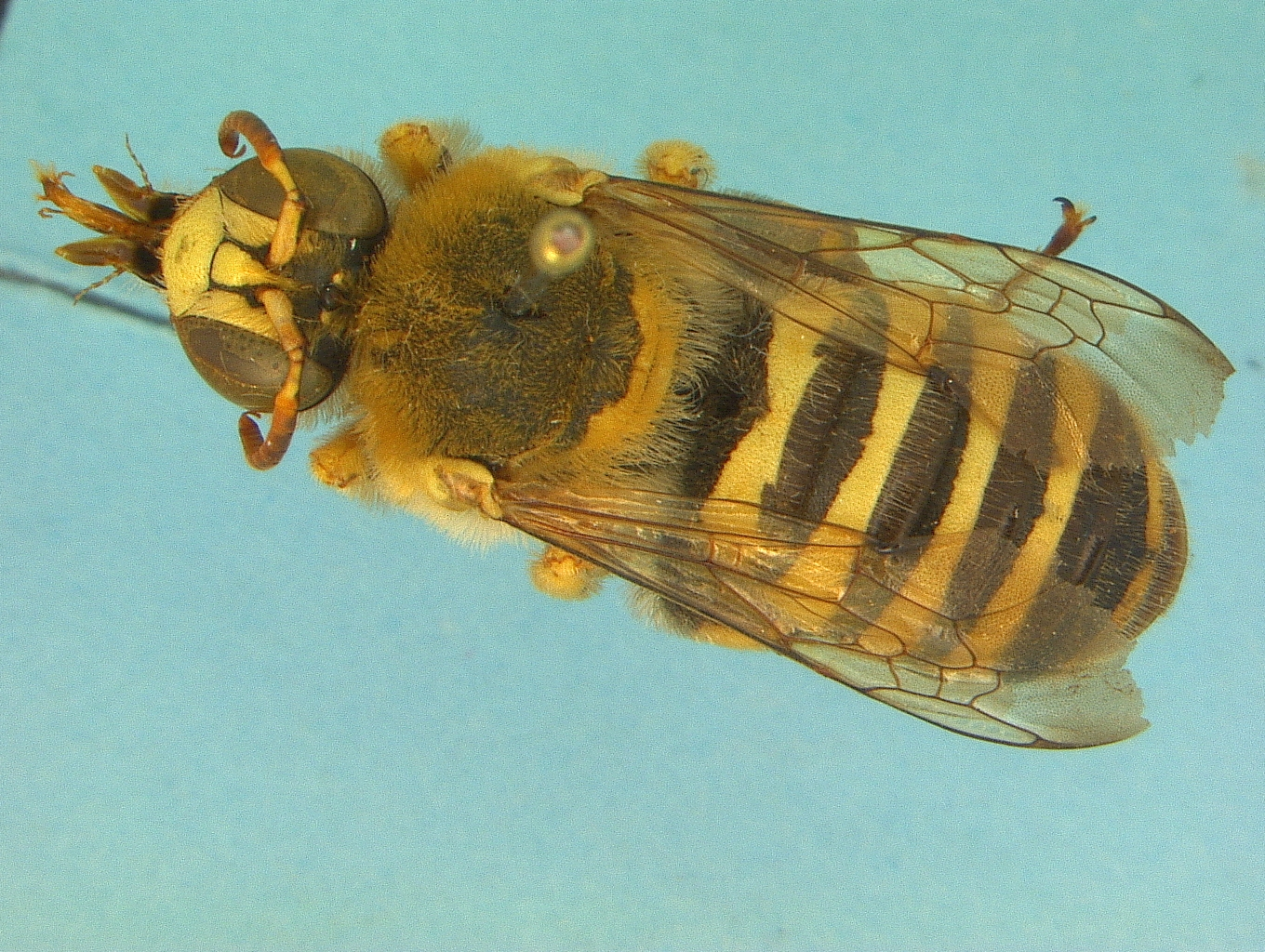
- Meganomia gigas

Scientific classification
- Kingdom: Animalia
- Phylum: Arthropoda
- Clade: Pancrustacea
- Class: Insecta
- Order: Hymenoptera
- Clade: Anthophila
- Family: Melittidae
- Subfamily: Meganomiinae

Genera
- Ceratomonia; Meganomia; Pseudophilanthus; Uromonia

= Meganomiinae =

Subfamily of bees

Meganomiinae is a subfamily of melittid bees, with 10 species in four genera, found only in Africa, primarily in xeric habitats, with the distributional limits in Yemen and Madagascar. They are rather different in appearance from the other groups of past/present melittids, being large bees (10–22 mm), mostly black with strong yellow markings, resembling anthidiine megachilids. Males of this subfamily are known to have hidden sterna.

== Taxonomy ==
Initial molecular work suggested that the family Melittidae was paraphyletic, and that its subfamilies (including Meganomiinae) should therefore be elevated to family status. However, these studies included very few melittids, due to their rarity. A 2013 investigation included a greater number of melittid bees and concluded that the family was probably monophyletic, thus supporting Meganomiinae as a subfamily of Melittidae.
