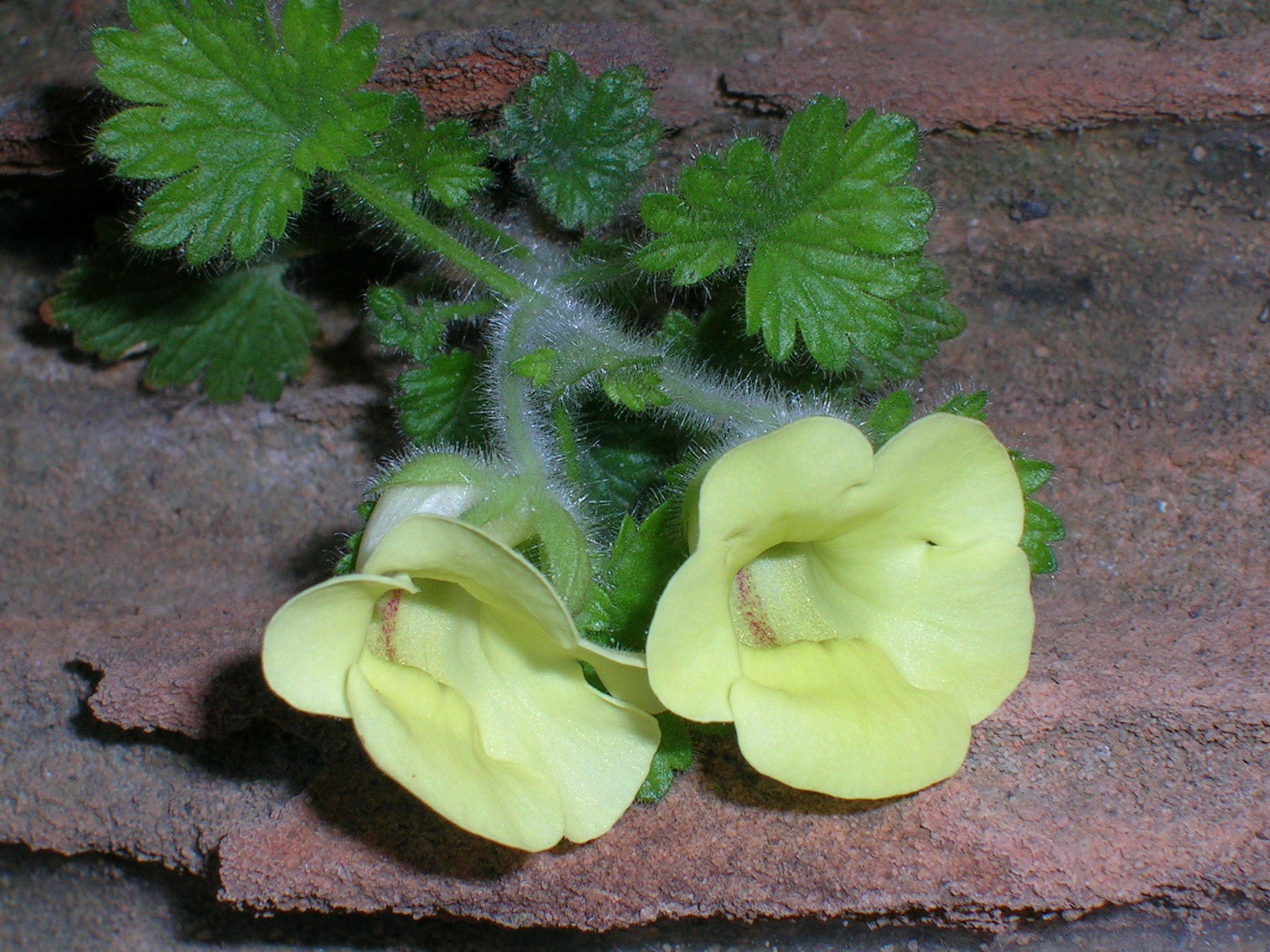

Conservation status
- Least Concern (SANBI Red List)

Scientific classification
- Kingdom: Plantae
- Clade: Tracheophytes
- Clade: Angiosperms
- Clade: Eudicots
- Clade: Asterids
- Order: Lamiales
- Family: Scrophulariaceae
- Tribe: Hemimerideae
- Genus: Colpias; E.Mey. ex Benth.
- Species: C. mollis

Binomial name
- Colpias mollis E.Mey. ex Benth.

= Colpias =

Genus of flowering plants

Colpias is a monotypic genus of flowering plant in the figwort family. It has only one currently accepted species, Colpias mollis, native to South Africa. It secretes oils to attract specialised oil-collecting bees from the genus Rediviva. It is also known by the name klipblom, meaning stone plant in Afrikaans.

== Description ==
Colpias mollis is a many-branched shrublet, with brittle branches, growing up to 200 mm high. The leaves and branches of Colpias mollis are covered with soft hairs. During spring the small plants produce showy clusters of white or yellow flowers with a sweet or clove-like scent. It is confined to rock crevices, mostly in granite. As they ripen the fruits move away from light to push the plant's seeds into suitable crevices.

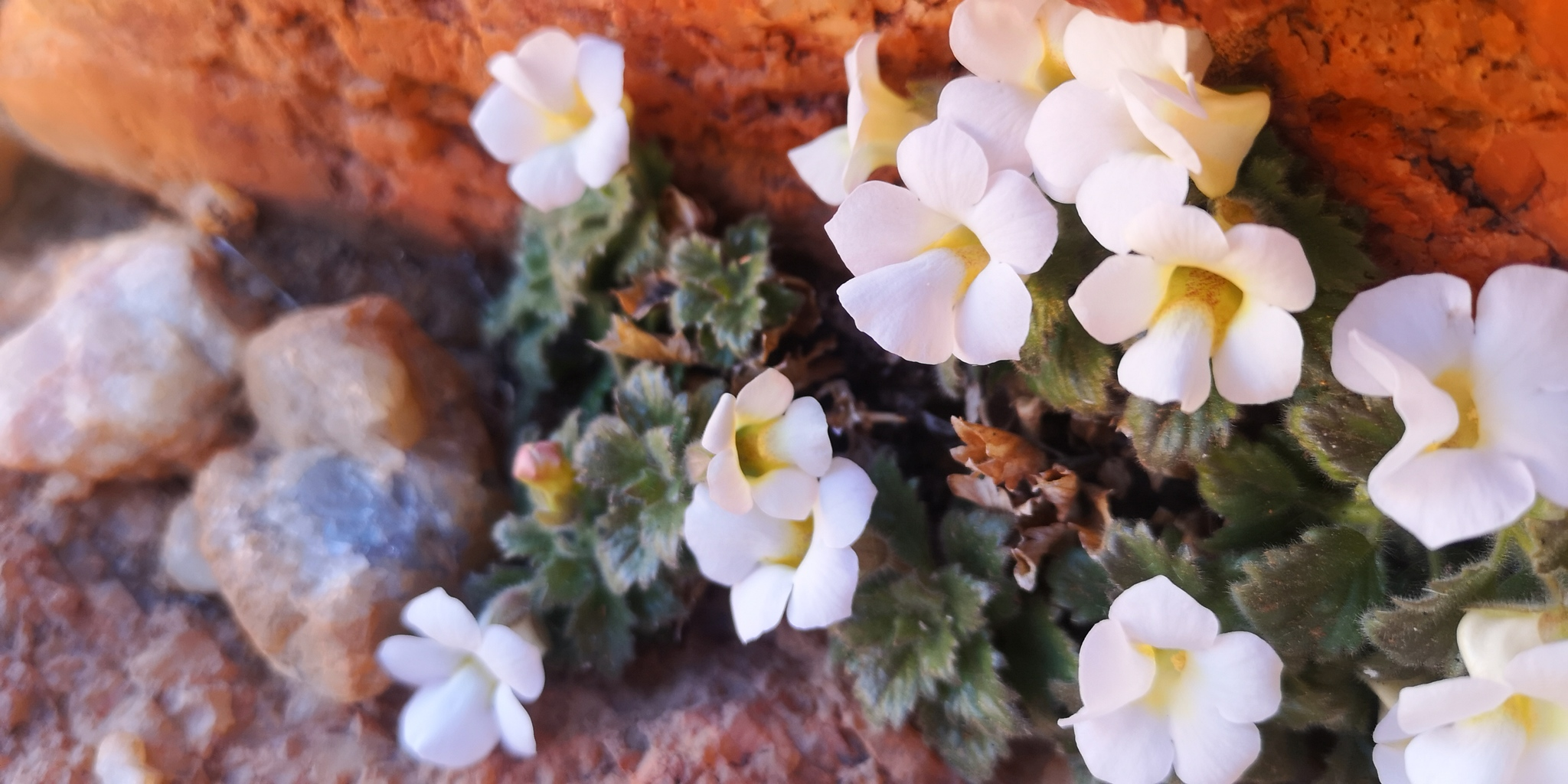

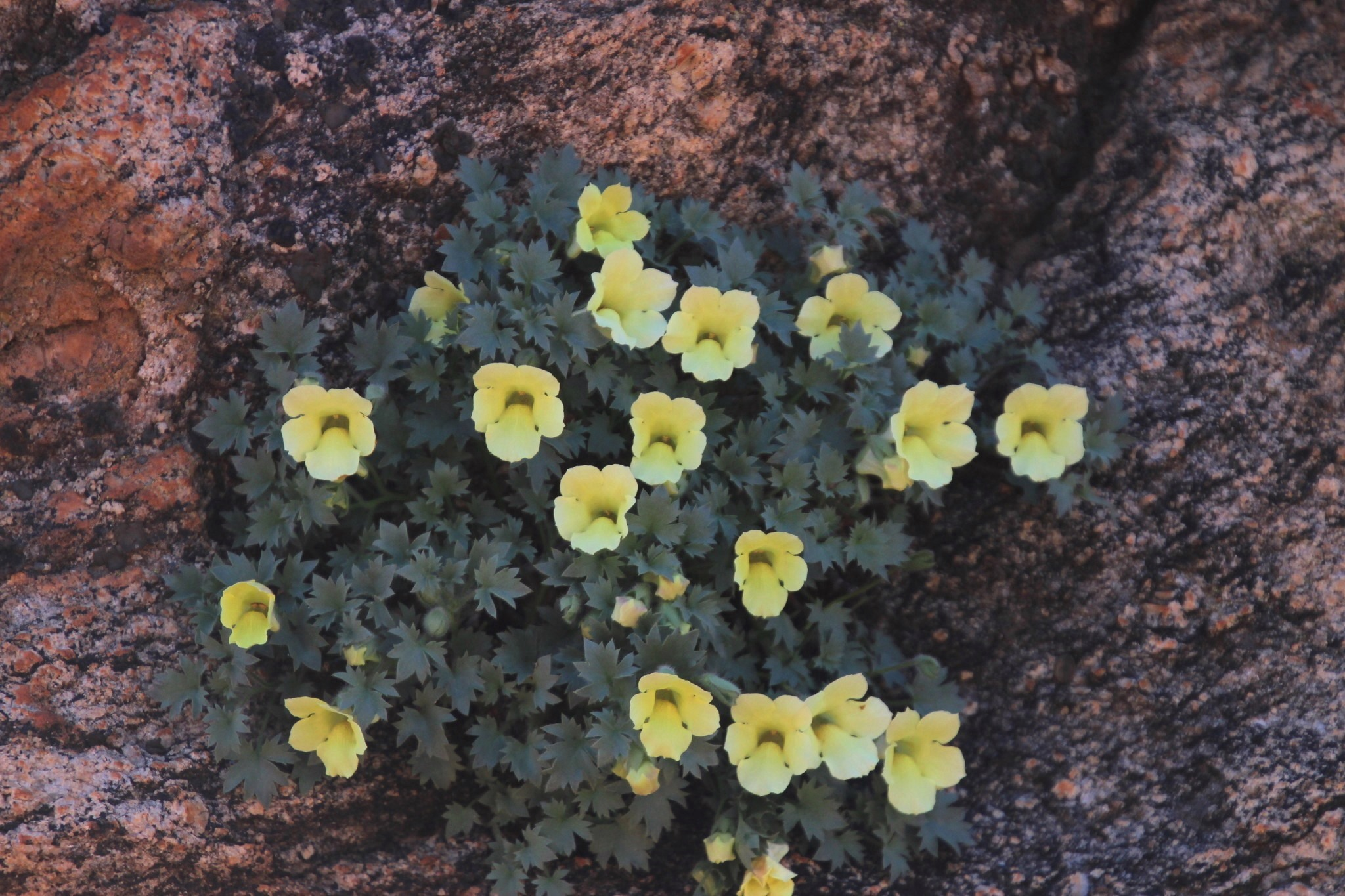

== Taxonomy ==
The genus Colpias was created in 1836 by botanist George Bentham who credited Ernst Heinrich Friedrich Meyer. It was created with one species and no further species has been added to the genus. Both are classified within the larger Scrophulariaceae family and the species has no subspecies or botanical synonyms. Bentham described the new taxa from a specimen collected, "On rocks near Zilverfontein in Namaqualand," by Johann Franz Drège.

=== Names ===
The Botanical Latin genus name, Colpias, is derived from the Ancient Greek κόλπος (kólpos) meaning bosom or breast as a reference to the pair of pouches on the flowers. The plant is known by the common names rock flower or klipblom.

== Distribution ==
Colpias mollis is endemic to the Northern Cape. It is found from the Richtersveld to near Kamieskroon, Namaqualand and the Bokkeveld Mountains.

== Conservation status ==
Colpias mollis is classified as Least Concern as it is widespread and not in decline.
