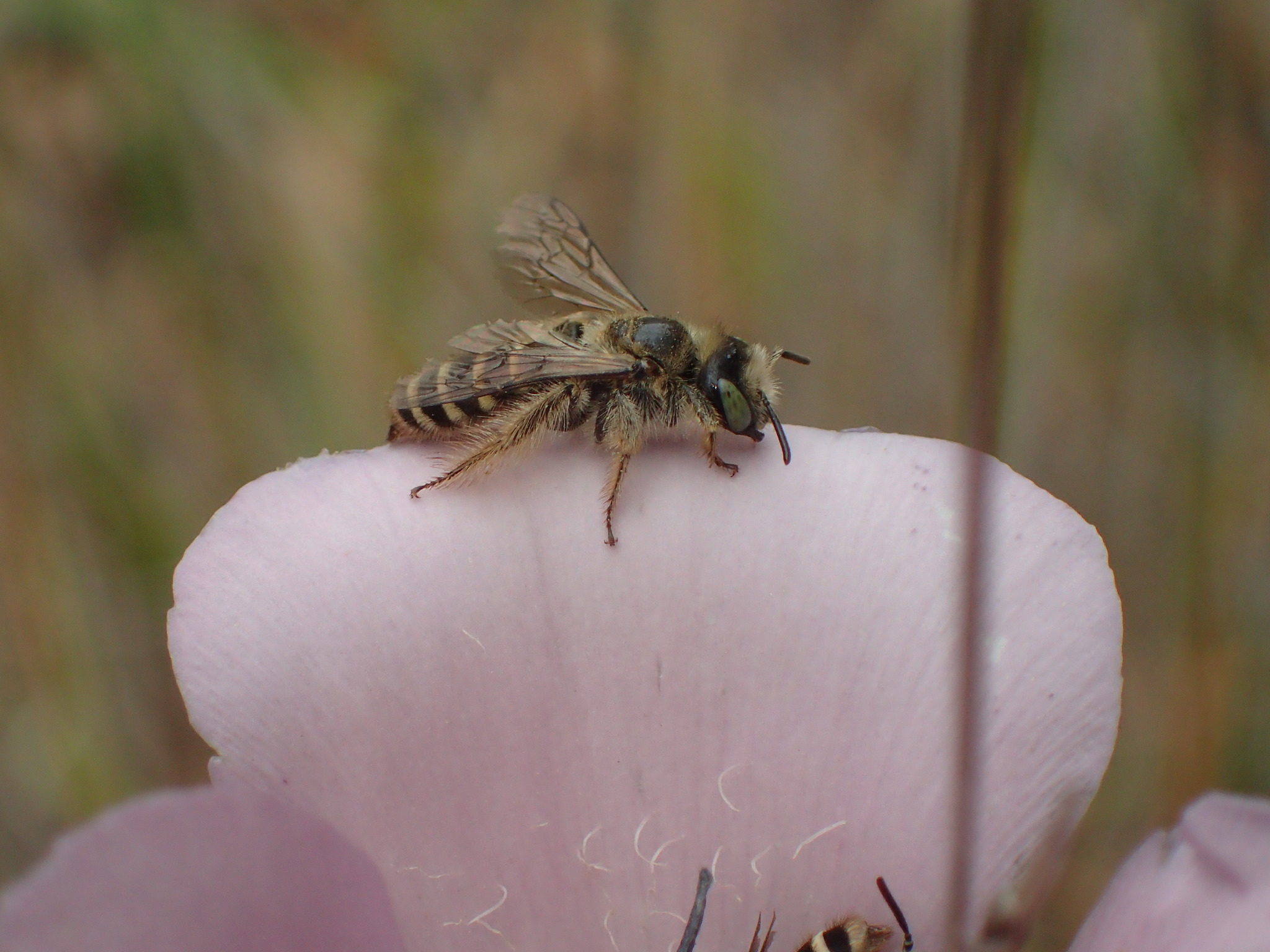

Scientific classification
- Kingdom: Animalia
- Phylum: Arthropoda
- Clade: Pancrustacea
- Class: Insecta
- Order: Hymenoptera
- Family: Melittidae
- Genus: Hesperapis
- Species: H. regularis

Binomial name
- Hesperapis regularis (Cresson, 1878)

= Hesperapis regularis =

Species of bee

Hesperapis regularis is an oligolectic bee in the family Melittidae.

== Distribution ==
This bee is native to California, and inhabits meadows, fields, and gardens, where it visits only flowers in the genus Clarkia. Numerous native species of Clarkia are found in California chaparral and woodlands, montane, and valley habitats.

== Description ==
The bees eat nectar, but their larvae feed upon a mass composed of both nectar and Clarkia pollen, placed in chambers underground.

== See also ==
- Fauna of the California chaparral and woodlands
