= Diascia integerrima =

Scientific classification
- Kingdom: Plantae
- Clade: Embryophytes
- Clade: Tracheophytes
- Clade: Angiosperms
- Clade: Eudicots
- Clade: Asterids
- Order: Lamiales
- Family: Scrophulariaceae
- Genus: Diascia
- Species: D. integerrima

Binomial name
- Diascia integerrima E.Mey. ex Benth.

Synonyms
- Diascia moltenensis Hiern; Nemesia hastata Benth.

Species of flowering plant

Diascia integerrima, the entire-leaved twinspur, is a species of flowering plant in the family Scrophulariaceae, native to South Africa and Lesotho. It is the hardiest of the twinspurs, to USDA zone 6a. It gained the Royal Horticultural Society's Award of Garden Merit in 1995, but the award appears to have been recently revoked.
