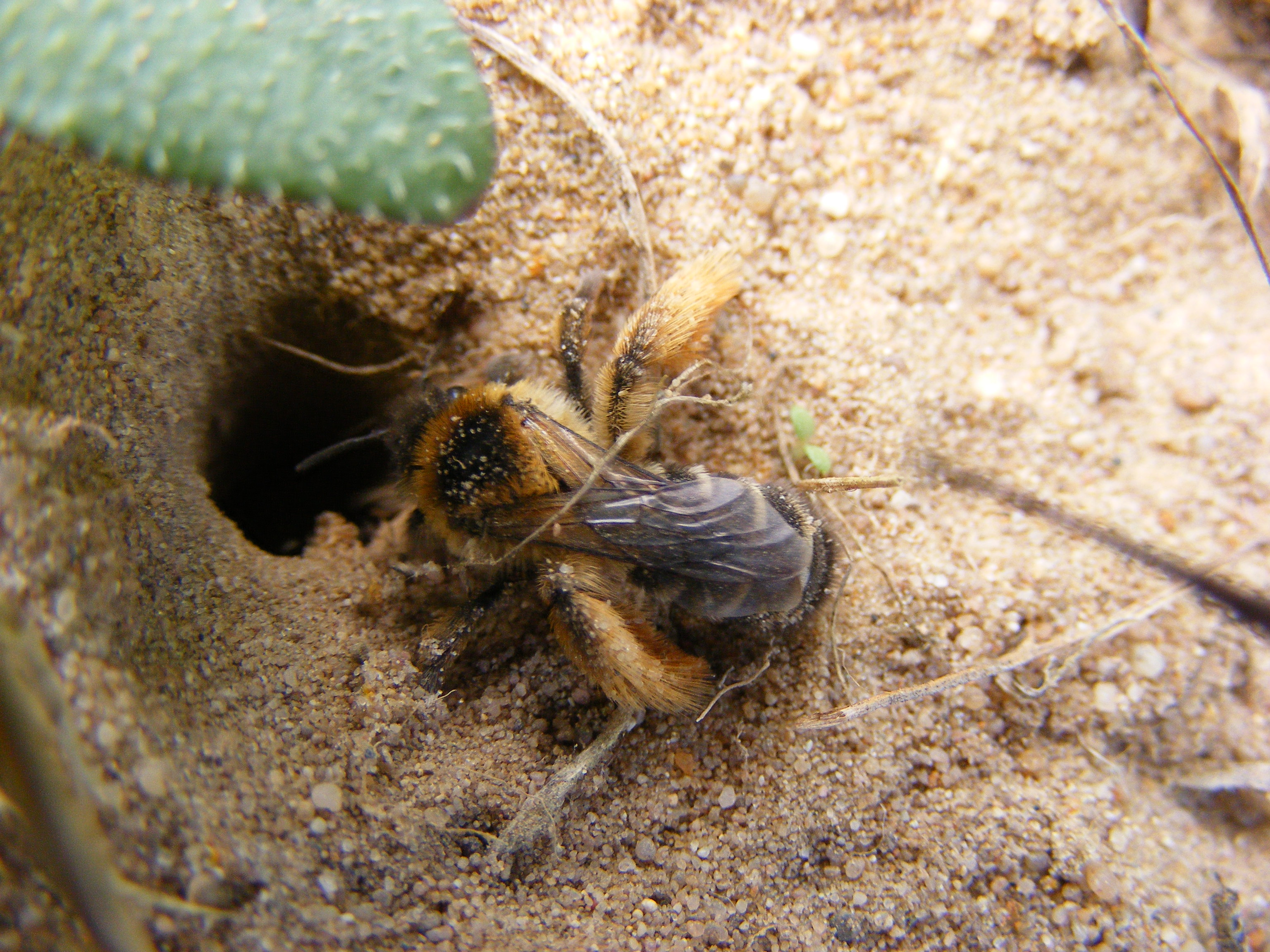
- Dasypoda altercator

Scientific classification
- Kingdom: Animalia
- Phylum: Arthropoda
- Clade: Pancrustacea
- Class: Insecta
- Order: Hymenoptera
- Family: Melittidae
- Subfamily: Dasypodainae

Genera
- (see text)

= Dasypodainae =

Subfamily of bees

The subfamily Dasypodainae (originally named "Dasypodidae") is a small subfamily of melittid bees, with more than 100 species in eight genera, found in Africa and the northern temperate zone, primarily in xeric habitats.

They are typically small to moderate-sized bees, with shaggy scopae, and are commonly oligolectic (e.g., Hesperapis regularis). All members of this subfamily have two submarginal cells in the forewing.

== Taxonomy ==
Initial molecular work suggested that the family Melittidae was paraphyletic, and that its subfamilies (including Dasypodainae) should therefore be elevated to family status. However, these studies included very few melittids, due to their rarity. A 2013 investigation included a greater number of melittid bees and concluded that the family was probably monophyletic, thus supporting Dasypodainae as a subfamily of Melittidae.

The largest genus, Hesperapis, contains some 40 known species, plus several more undescribed ones, with an unusual disjunct distribution in North America and southern Africa.

The subfamily Dasypodainae groups these tribes and genera:

- Tribe Dasypodaini
  - Dasypoda
  - Eremaphanta
  - Capicola
  - Hesperapis
    - Hesperapis regularis — specialist on Clarkia species flowers in California chaparral and woodlands habitats and gardens in California.
- Tribe Sambini
  - Haplomelitta
  - Samba
- Tribe Promelittini
  - Promelitta
  - Afrodasypoda
