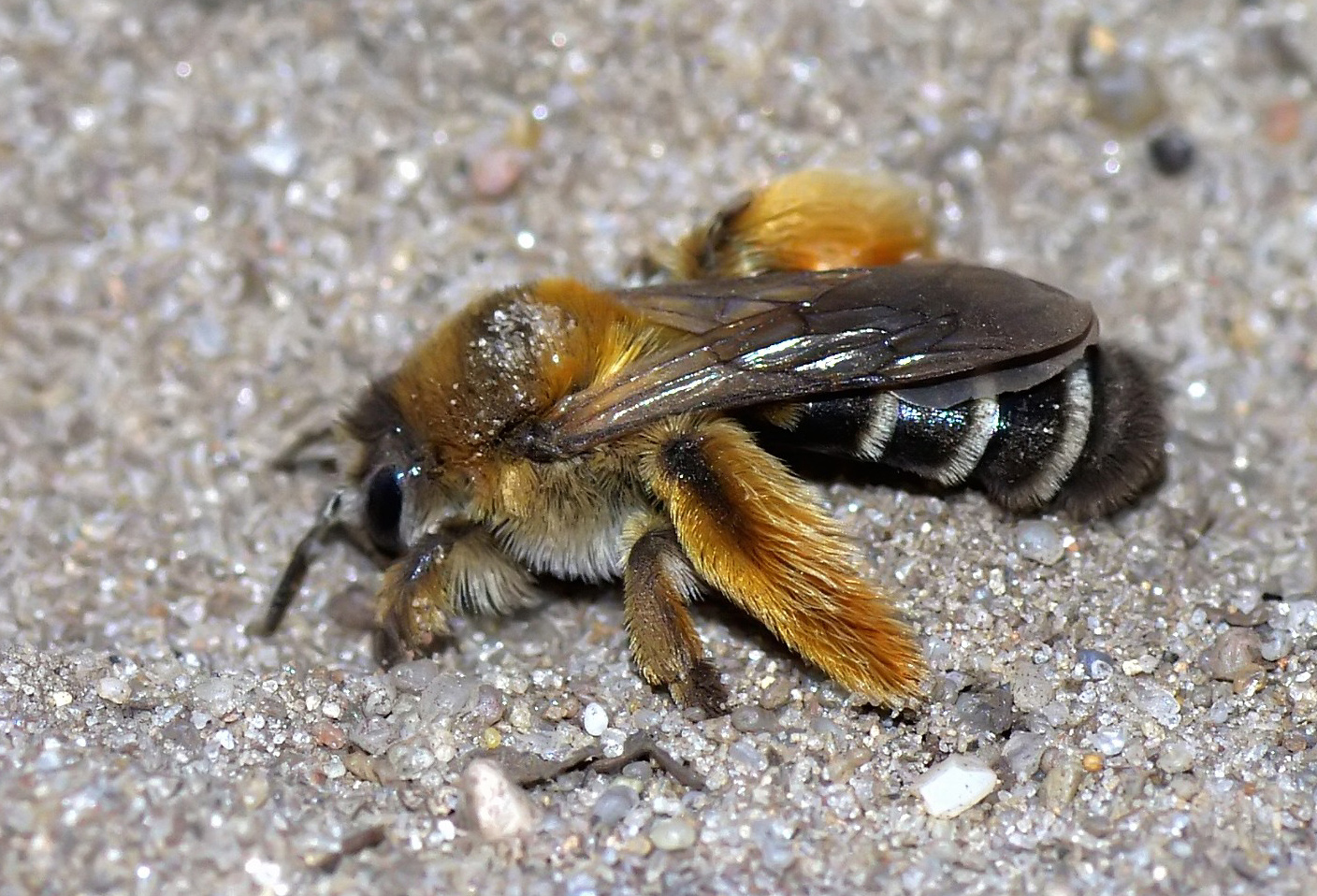
- Female

Conservation status
- Least Concern (IUCN 3.1)

Scientific classification
- Kingdom: Animalia
- Phylum: Arthropoda
- Clade: Pancrustacea
- Class: Insecta
- Order: Hymenoptera
- Family: Melittidae
- Genus: Dasypoda
- Species: D. hirtipes

Binomial name
- Dasypoda hirtipes (Fabricius, 1793)

Synonyms
- Apis altercator Harris, 1780; Andrena hirtipes Fabricius 1793; Andrena plumipes Panzer, 1797; Melitta swammerdamella Kirby, 1802; Dasypoda graeca Lelepetier & Serville, 1825; Dasypoda panzeri Spinola, 1838; Dasypoda villosa Lelepetier, 1841; Dasypoda minor Pérez, 1903 (nec Morawitz, 1871); Dasypoda plumipes auct. (dont Friese, 1901)

= Dasypoda hirtipes =

Species of bee

Dasypoda hirtipes, the common pantaloon bee or hairy-legged mining bee, is a species of solitary mining bee from the family Melittidae. It is a widespread bee which is found from Great Britain to China.

== Description ==
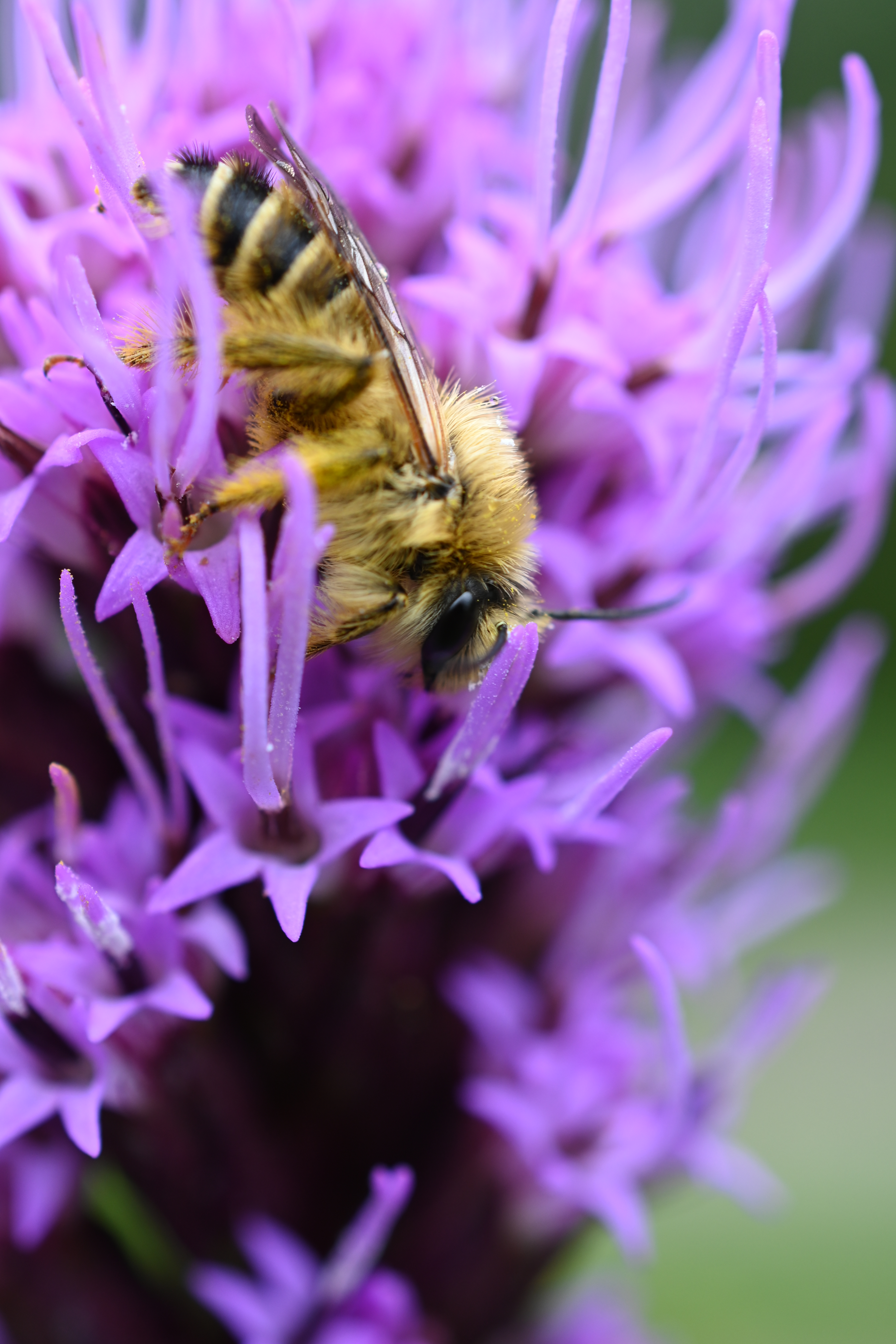
Male Dasypoda hirtipes

Dasypoda hirtipes get one of their common names, the pantaloon bee, from the hirsute hind legs of the females which apparently swell up with pollen, deposited in the golden hairs of the hind tibiae as the bee forages making them look as if they are wearing pantaloons. The "pantaloons" make the females highly distinctive and easy to identify, otherwise they are a medium to large bee with yellowish-brown colouration on the thorax and the abdomen is banded with black and golden-brown. Males are less obvious but the abdomen is similar to the female's but their body is coated in long brown hairs. Their legs have longer hair than most bees but they do not have "pantaloons". As they age the sun can cause the colour of the males to fade to silvery-white.

== Distribution ==
Dasypoda hirtipes occurs across Eurasia from southern Britain to China. It occurs as far north as southern Finland and southern Scandinavia and south to North Africa and the Canary Islands. Within Britain it is found in southern England as far north as Norfolk and western Wales, it is also found on Jersey and Guernsey in the Channel island.

== Habitat and biology ==
Dasypoda hirtipes shows a preference for exposed sandy areas including shrubby Mediterranean vegetation and grassland in temperate regions, however, the species can also common in urban and suburban areas. In Britain sandy heathlands and coastal dunes are the preferred habitats. The females dig out nesting burrows in sandy soil and they frequently nest in large congregations, however, each female only looks after her own nest. The main shaft is quite lengthy and can be between 8 and 60 centimetres (3.1 and 23.6 in) long. The female digs it at an oblique angle which results in the spoil being deposited in a fan at one side of the entrance. The female digs side tunnels out from the main shaft at its end. Females excavate their nests in the afternoons in Denmark and rarely leave their burrows after the early afternoon. The hairy "pantaloons" assist in the excavation of the nest as well as being useful for carrying pollen. These bees tend to concentrate their foraging on flowers from the Asteraceae, especially those with yellow, composite flowers like hawk's beards, ragworts, common fleabane, Hawkbits, cat's ear and oxtongues. The flesh flies of the genus Miltogramma appear to be significant parasitoids in the nests of D. hirtipes. The flight period of D. hirtipes in Britain is June to late August.

== Taxonomy ==
A new species Dasypodus morawitzi was described in 2016 from museum specimens collected in eastern Europe, Russia, Central Asia and Turkey and which had been labelled as D. hirtipes. Some of these had been labelled as the subspecies D. h. minor but this name was judged not to be valid so the authors named the new species in honour of Ferdinand Morawitz who had collected many of these specimens.

== Conservation ==
Dasypoda hirtipes is classed by the IUCN as Least Concern. However, it is listed as Near Threatened in Germany and Sweden, Vulnerable in Switzerland and Endangered in Norway and Slovenia. It is a nationally notable species in the United Kingdom.
