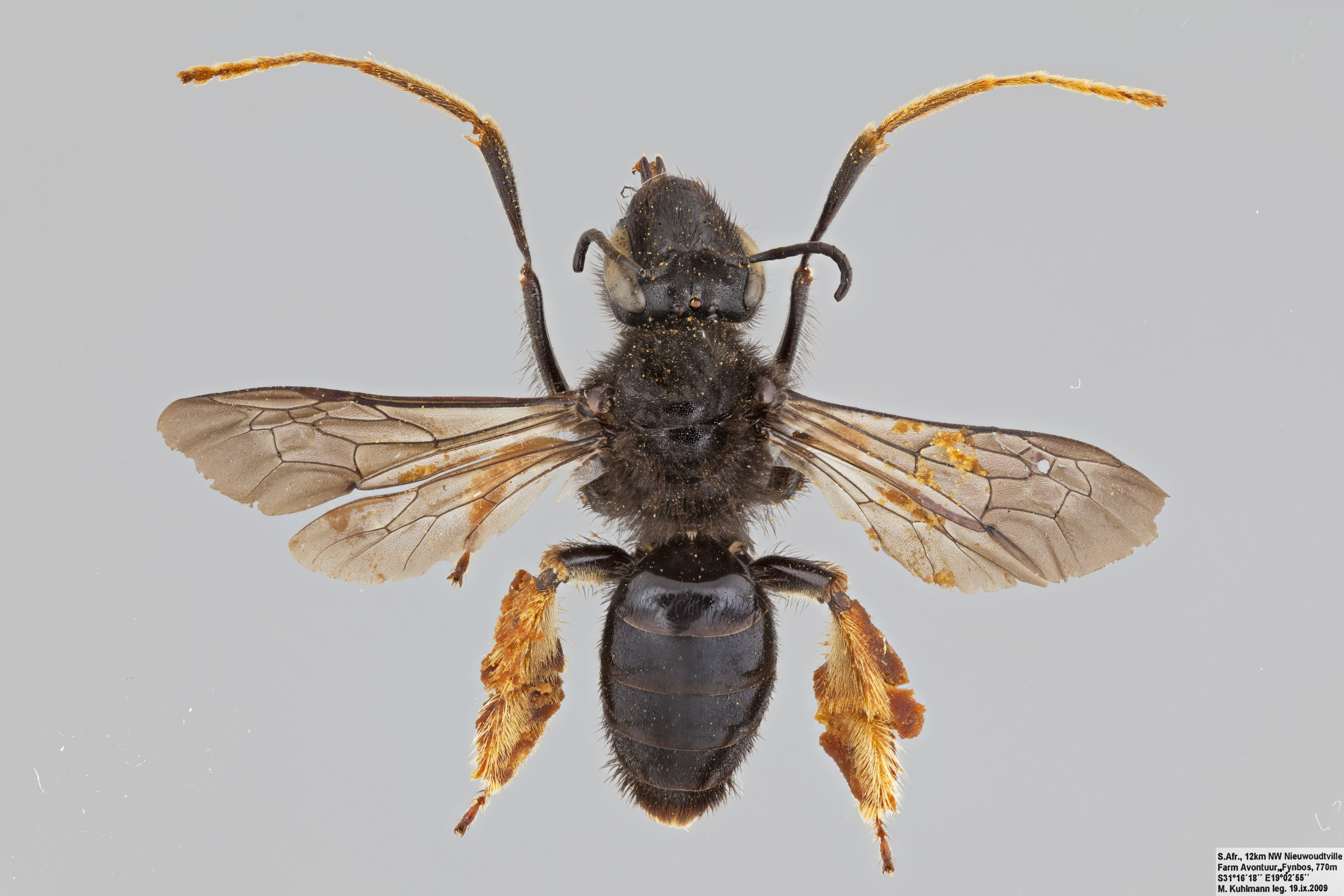
- Rediviva longimanus (female)

Scientific classification
- Domain: Eukaryota
- Kingdom: Animalia
- Phylum: Arthropoda
- Class: Insecta
- Order: Hymenoptera
- Family: Melittidae
- Subfamily: Melittinae
- Genus: Rediviva; Friese, 1911

= Rediviva =

Genus of bees

Rediviva is a genus of bees in the Melittidae family endemic to South Africa.

== Species ==
- Rediviva albifasciata Whitehead & Steiner, 1994
- Rediviva alonsoae Whitehead & Steiner, 2001
- Rediviva aurata Whitehead & Steiner, 2001
- Rediviva colorata Michener, 1981
- Rediviva emdeorum Vogel & Michener, 1985
- Rediviva gigas Whitehead & Steiner, 1993
- Rediviva intermedia Whitehead & Steiner, 2001
- Rediviva intermixta (Cockerell, 1934)
- Rediviva longimanus Michener, 1981
- Rediviva macgregori Whitehead & Steiner, 2001
- Rediviva micheneri Whitehead & Steiner, 2001
- Rediviva neliana Cockerell, 1931
- Rediviva nitida Whitehead & Steiner, 2001
- Rediviva pallidula Whitehead & Steiner, 1992
- Rediviva parva Whitehead & Steiner, 2001
- Rediviva peringueyi (Friese, 1911)
- Rediviva politissima (Cockerell, 1934)
- Rediviva ruficornis Whitehead & Steiner, 2001
- Rediviva rufipes (Friese, 1913)
- Rediviva rufocincta (Cockerell, 1934)
- Rediviva saetigera Whitehead & Steiner, 1992
- Rediviva steineri Kuhlmann, 2012
- Rediviva vogeli Melin & Colville, 2024
