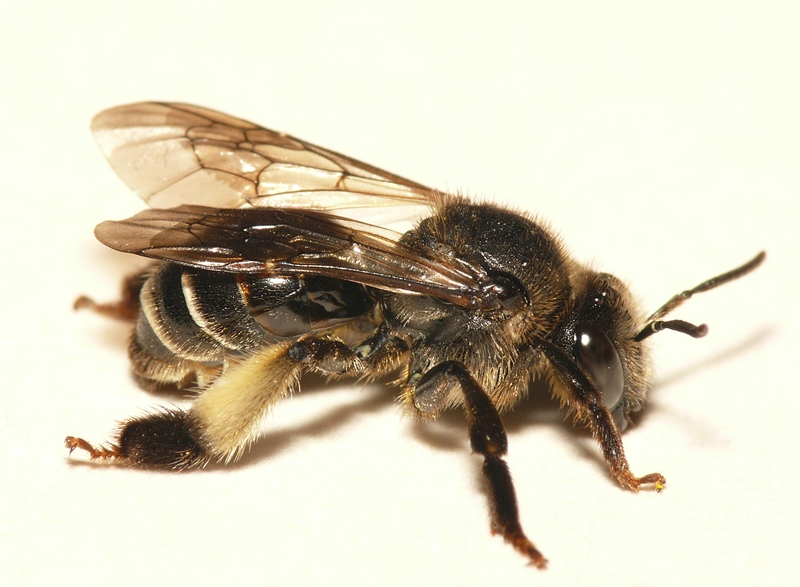
- Macropis europaea, female

Scientific classification
- Kingdom: Animalia
- Phylum: Arthropoda
- Clade: Pancrustacea
- Class: Insecta
- Order: Hymenoptera
- Clade: Anthophila
- Family: Melittidae

Subfamilies
- Dasypodainae; Melittinae; Meganomiinae

= Melittidae =

Melittidae Temporal range: Eocene–Present

Family of bees

Melittidae is a small bee family, with over 200 described species in three subfamilies. The family has a limited distribution, with all described species restricted to Africa and the northern temperate zone.

Fossil melittids have been found occasionally in Eocene amber deposits, including those of Oise, France and the Baltic amber.

== Evolution ==
Early molecular work suggested that the family Melittidae was sister to all other bees, and also that it was paraphyletic. Because of this finding, it was suggested that the three subfamilies of Melittidae should be elevated to family status. Neither study included many melittids, due to their rarity. Later studies suggested that the family could still be monophyletic and a 2013 investigation including a greater number of melittid bees further supports this.

Recent research has shown that Melittids have a lower extinction rate compared to other hymenopterans, yet this family is considered species-poor. This is attributed to a significantly lower diversification rate as seen in other bee families. Danforth et al. suggests that this is because they are oligoleges, whereas other bees express polylecty (diverse host-plant preferences) allowing them to increase their diversification rate compared to melittids.

Evidence of oil-collection behaviour has been present in melittids since the early Eocene. Amber from Oise, France provided the oldest record of Melittidae and the fourth oldest fossilized bee specimen.

== Characteristics ==
Melittids are typically small to moderate-sized bees, which are well known for their specialist and oligolectic foraging habits.

Melittids are strictly solitary and they nest in burrows that they dig in soil or sand. All females can reproduce and tend to emerge from the ground some days after the male. They generally mate on host-plants surrounding the area they have emerged. After mating, the gravid female creates a burrow where they bring pollen. On top of the pollen, one egg is laid. This is consumed by the larva over 10 days, after which the larva overwinters and pupates in the next year.

Many melittids (such as Macropis) possess specialized morphology that allow them to collect floral oil.

== Classification ==
The following genera are classified under Melittidae:

- Afrodasypoda
- Capicola
- Ceratomonia
- Dasypoda
- Eremaphanta
- Haplomelitta
- Hesperapis
- Macropis
- Meganomia
- Melitta
- Pseudophilanthus
- Promelitta
- Rediviva
- Redivivoides
- Samba
- Uronomia

== Sources ==
- Michez, Denis (2008). "Monographic revision of the melittid bees (Hymenoptera, Apoidea, Melittidae sensu lato" (PDF). Proc. Neth. Entomol. Soc. Meet. Archived from the original (PDF) on 6 October 2019.
- Hedtke, Shannon H. (2013). "The bee tree of life: a supermatrix approach to apoid phylogeny and biogeography". BMC Evolutionary Biology. 13 (138): 138. doi:10.1186/1471-2148-13-138. PMC 3706286. PMID 23822725.
- Michez, Denis; Nel, Andre; Menier, Jean-Jacques; Rasmont, Pierre (2007). "The oldest fossil of a melittid bee (Hymenoptera: Apiformes) from the early Eocene of Oise (France)" (PDF). Zoological Journal of the Linnean Society. 150 (4): 701–709. doi:10.1111/j.1096-3642.2007.00307.x.
- Engel, Michael S. (2001). "A monograph of the Baltic Amber bees and evolution of the Apoidea (Hymenoptera)". Bulletin of the American Museum of Natural History. 259: 1–192. doi:10.1206/0003-0090(2001)259<0001:amotba>2.0.co;2. hdl:2246/1437. S2CID 84098356.
- Danforth, Bryan (2007). "Bees - a primer" (PDF). Current Biology. 17 (5): 156–161. doi:10.1016/j.cub.2007.01.025. PMID 17339010. Archived from the original (PDF) on December 11, 2009.
- Michez, Denis; Patiny, Sébastien; Danforth, Bryan N. (2009). "Phylogeny of the bee family Melittidae (Hymenoptera: Anthophila) based on combined molecular and morphological data". Systematic Entomology. 34 (3): 574–597. doi:10.1111/j.1365-3113.2009.00479.x. ISSN 1365-3113. S2CID 85429197.
- Murray, Elizabeth A.; Bossert, Silas; Danforth, Bryan N. (28 November 2018). "Pollinivory and the diversification dynamics of bees". Biology Letters. 14 (11) 20180530. The Royal Society Publishing. doi:10.1098/rsbl.2018.0530. PMC 6283915. PMID 30429246.
- Michez, Denis; Nel, Andre; Jean-Jacques, Menier; Pierre, Rasmont (December 2006). "Melittid bee (Hymenoptera: Apiformes) from the early Eocene of Oise (France)" (PDF). 150: 701–709. Archived from the original (PDF) on 6 October 2019.
- Michez, Denis; Patiny, Sébastien; Rasmont, Pierre; Timmermann, Kim; Vereecken, Nicolas J. (23 January 2008). "Phylogeny and host-plant evolution in Melittidae (Hymenoptera: Apoidea)" (PDF). Apidologie. 39 (1): 146–162. doi:10.1051/apido:2007048. S2CID 39528269.
- Michener, Charles D. (2000). The Bees of the World. Johns Hopkins University Press.
