= Hippocrateaceae =

Family of flowering plants

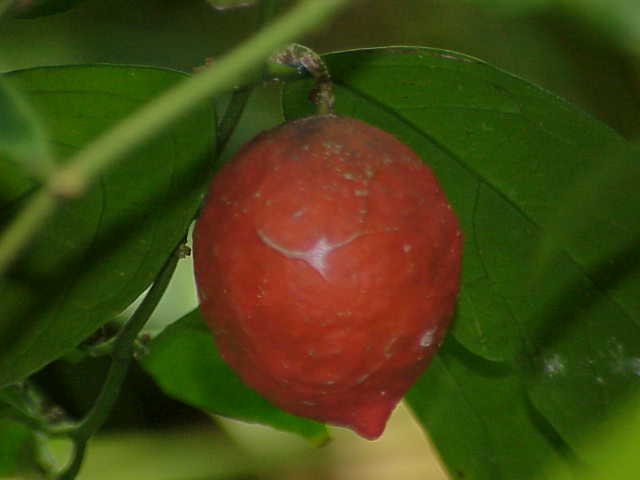
Fruit of Salacia lehmbachii, formerly placed in Hippocrateaceae

Hippocrateaceae Juss. previously consisted of about 150 tropical and subtropical species of shrubs and lianes, and is now included in the family Celastraceae. Formerly it comprised the following genera:

- Anthodon
- Apodostigma
- Arnicratea
- Bequaertia
- Campylostemon
- Cheiloclinium
- Cuervea
- Elachyptera
- Helictonema
- Hippocratea
- Hylenaea
- Loeseneriella
- Peritassa
- Prionostemma
- Pristimera
- Reissantia
- Salacia
- Salacighia
- Salaciopsis
- Semialarium
- Simicratea
- Simirestis
- Thyrsosalacia
- Tontelea
- Tristemonanthus
