= List of tree genera =

The major tree genera are listed below by taxonomic family.

== Flowering plants ==
For classification of flowering plants, see APG II system.

=== Eudicots ===
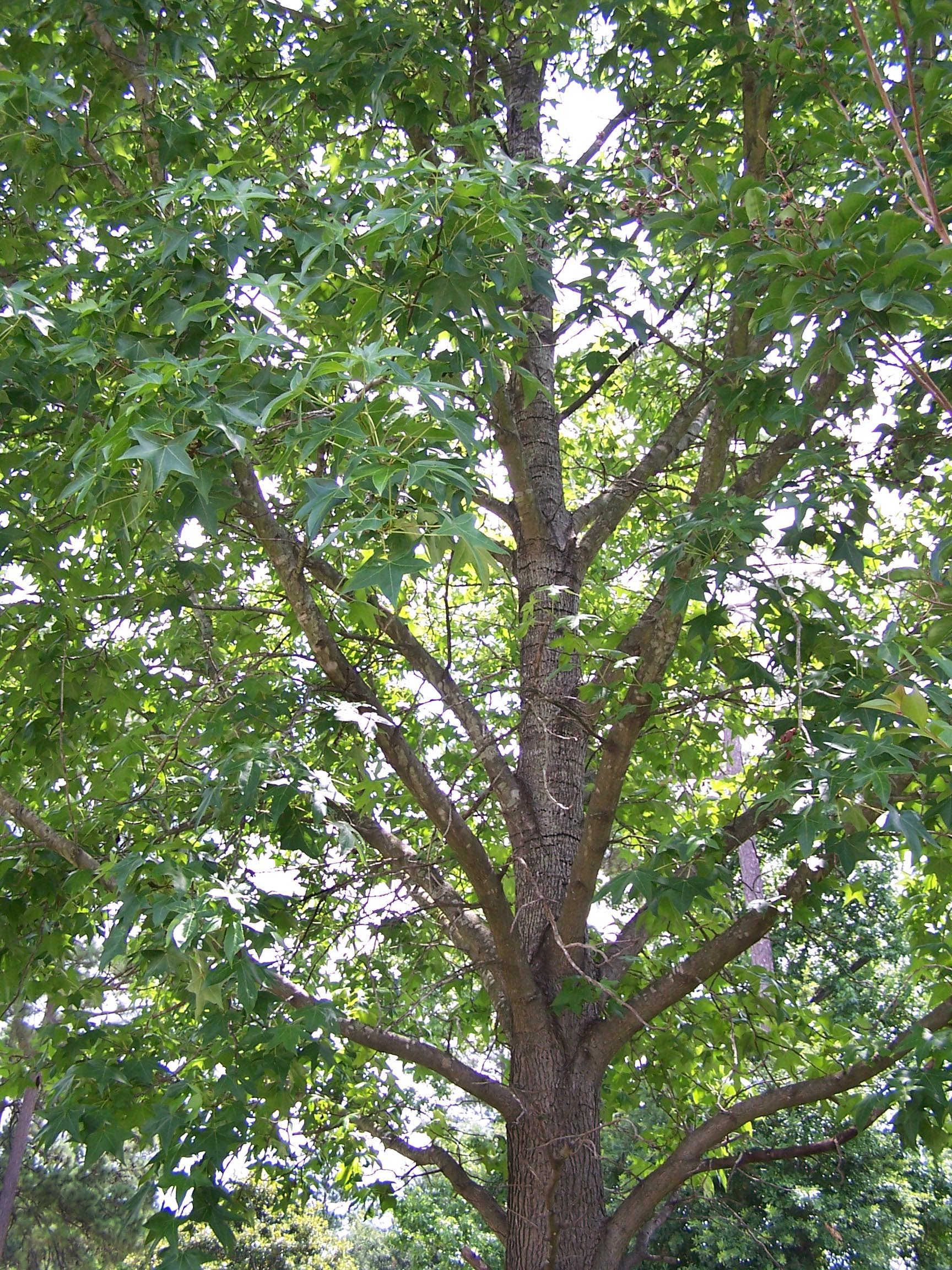
American sweetgum (Liquidambar styraciflua, Altingiaceae)

About 210 eudicot families include trees.

- Altingiaceae (sweetgum family)
  - Liquidambar, sweetgum
- Anacardiaceae (Cashew family)
  - Anacardium, Cashew etc.
  - Mangifera, Mango
  - Pistacia, Pistachio etc.
  - Rhus, Sumac
  - Toxicodendron, Lacquer tree etc.
- Apocynaceae (Dogbane family)
  - Pachypodium
- Aquifoliaceae (Holly family)
  - Ilex, Holly
- Araliaceae (Ivy family)
  - Harmsiopanax
  - Kalopanax septemlobus, Kalopanax
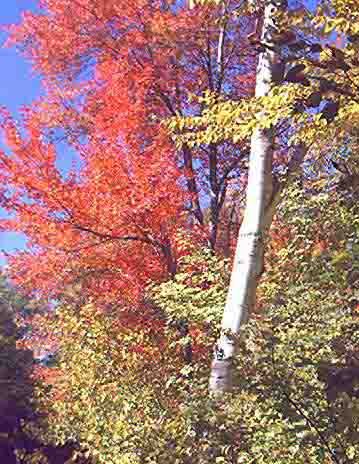
    Birch tree (foreground) and maple tree (background) in fall
  - Schefflera, Schefflera
- Betulaceae (Birch family)
  - Alnus, Alder
  - Betula, Birch
  - Carpinus, Hornbeam
  - Corylus, Hazel
- Bignoniaceae (Trumpet Creeper family)
  - Catalpa, Catalpa
  - Jacaranda
  - Tabebuia
- Cactaceae (Cactus family)
  - Carnegiea gigantea, Saguaro
- Cannabaceae (Cannabis family)
  - Celtis, Hackberry
- Celastraceae (Bittersweet family)
  - Apodostigma
  - Arnicratea
  - Bequaertia
  - Brexiella
  - Cassine
  - Catha, Khat
  - Cheiloclinium
  - Crossopetalum, Maiden berries
  - Denhamia
  - Elachyptera
  - Elaeodendron, Olivewoods
  - Euonymus, Spindle trees
  - Glyptopetalum
  - Gyminda
  - Gymnosporia
  - Hartogiopsis
  - Haydenoxylon
- Cornaceae (Dogwood family)
  - Cornus, Dogwood
- Family Dipterocarpaceae
  - Dipterocarpus, Garjan
  - Shorea, Sal etc.

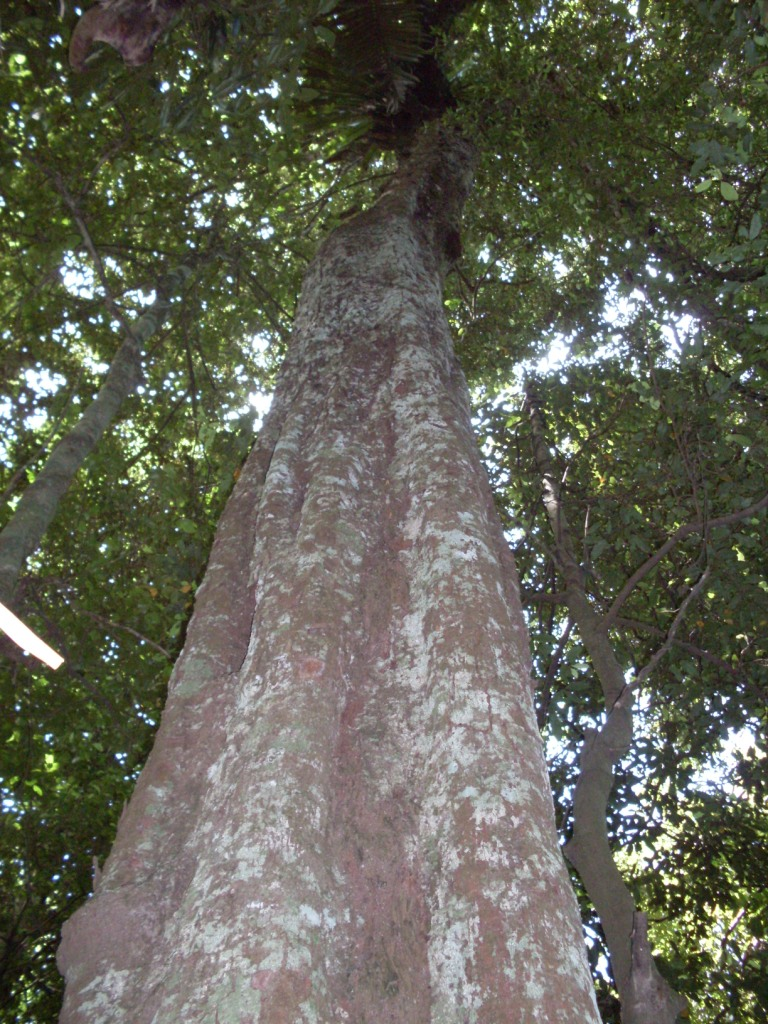
Cryptocarya glaucescens (Lauraceae) in Royal National Park, Australia

- Ebenaceae (Persimmon family)
  - Diospyros, Persimmon
- Ericaceae (Heath family)
  - Arbutus, Arbutus
- Eucommiaceae (Eucommia family)
  - Eucommia ulmoides, Eucommia
- Fabaceae (Pea family)
  - Acacia, Acacia
  - Bauhinia Orchid tree etc.
  - Caesalpinia, Brazilwood etc.
  - Gleditsia, Honey locust etc.
  - Laburnum, Laburnum
  - Robinia, Black locust etc.
- Fagaceae (Beech family)
  - Castanea, Chestnut
  - Fagus, Beech
  - Lithocarpus, Tanoak etc.
  - Quercus, Oak

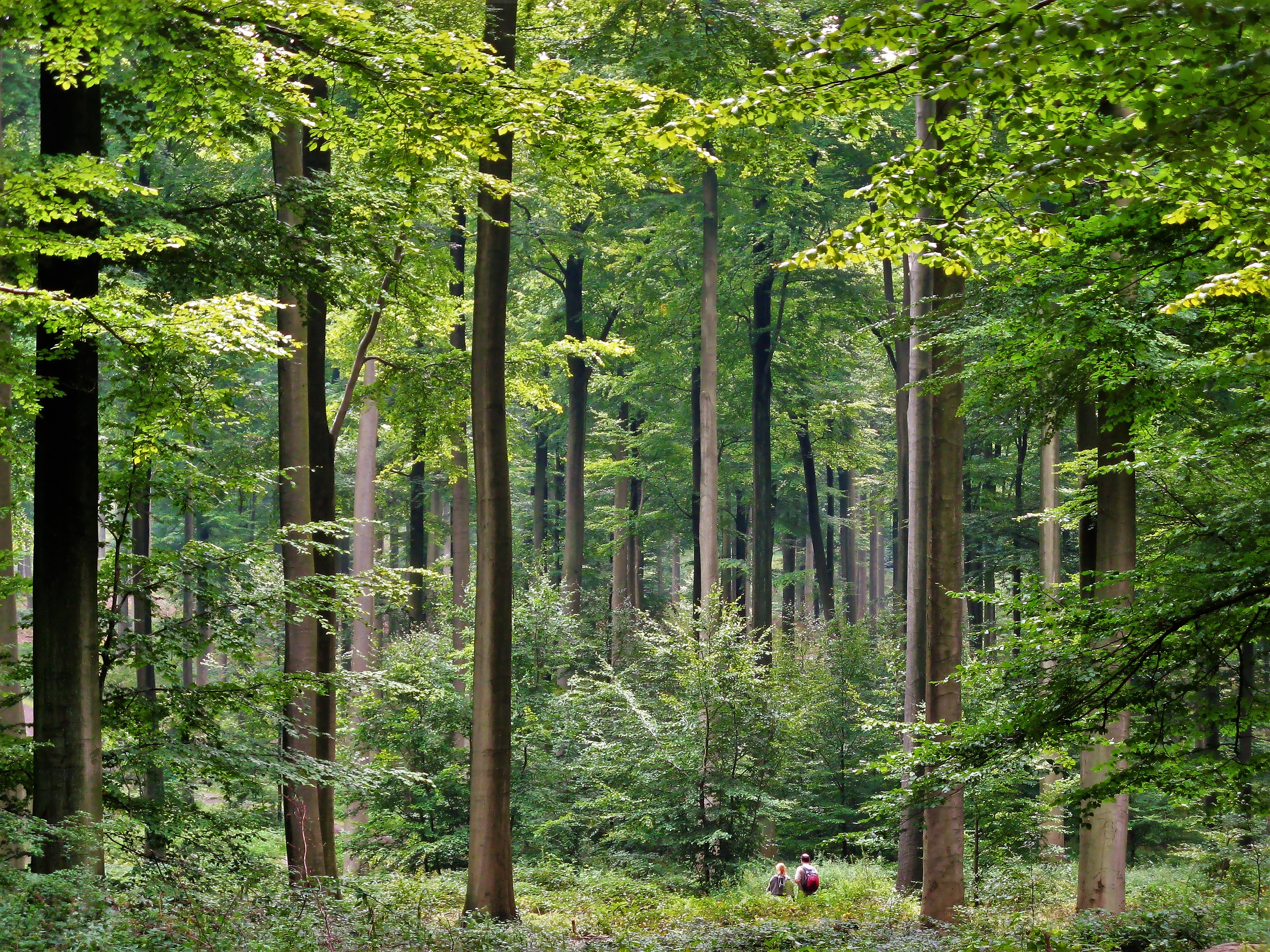
European beeches (Fagaceae) in the Sonian Forest, Belgium

- Fouquieriaceae (Boojum family)
  - Fouquieria, Boojum etc.
- Hamamelidaceae (Witch-hazel family)
  - Parrotia persica, Persian Ironwood
- Juglandaceae (Walnut family)
  - Carya, Hickory
  - Juglans, Walnut
  - Pterocarya, Wingnut
- Lecythidaceae (Paradise nut family)
  - Bertholletia excelsa, Brazil Nut
- Lythraceae (Loosestrife family)
  - Lagerstroemia, Crape-myrtle
- Malvaceae (Mallow family; including Tiliaceae, Sterculiaceae and Bombacaceae)
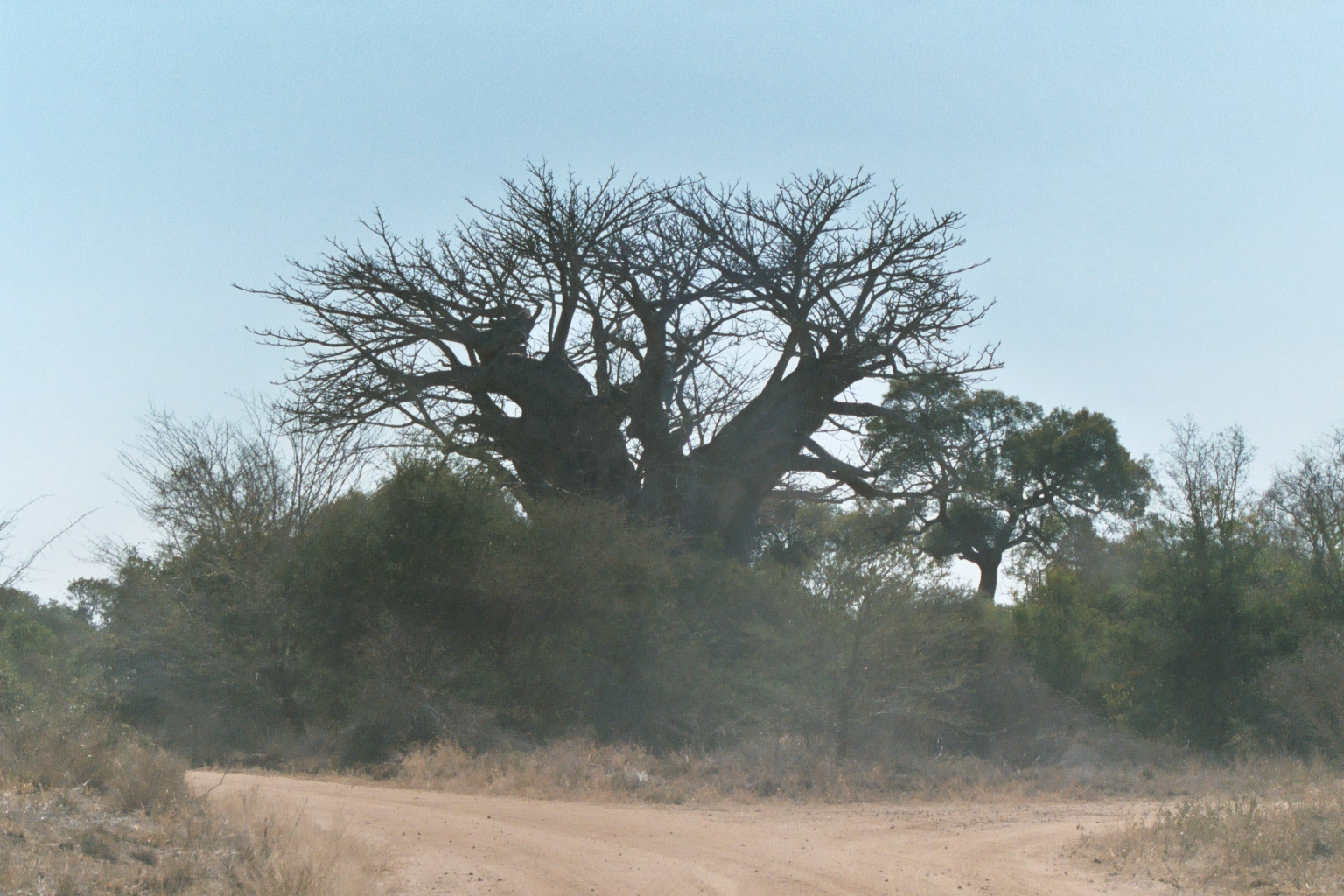
  African baobab (Adansonia digitata, Malvaceae) in South Africa
  - Adansonia, Baobab
  - Bombax, Silk-cotton tree
  - Brachychiton, Bottletrees
  - Ceiba, Kapok etc.
  - Durio, Durian
  - Ochroma pyramidale, Balsa
  - Theobroma, Cacao etc.
  - Tilia, Linden (Basswood, Lime)
- Meliaceae (Mahogany family)
  - Azadirachta, Neem etc.
  - Melia, Bead tree etc.
  - Swietenia, Mahogany
- Moraceae (Mulberry family)
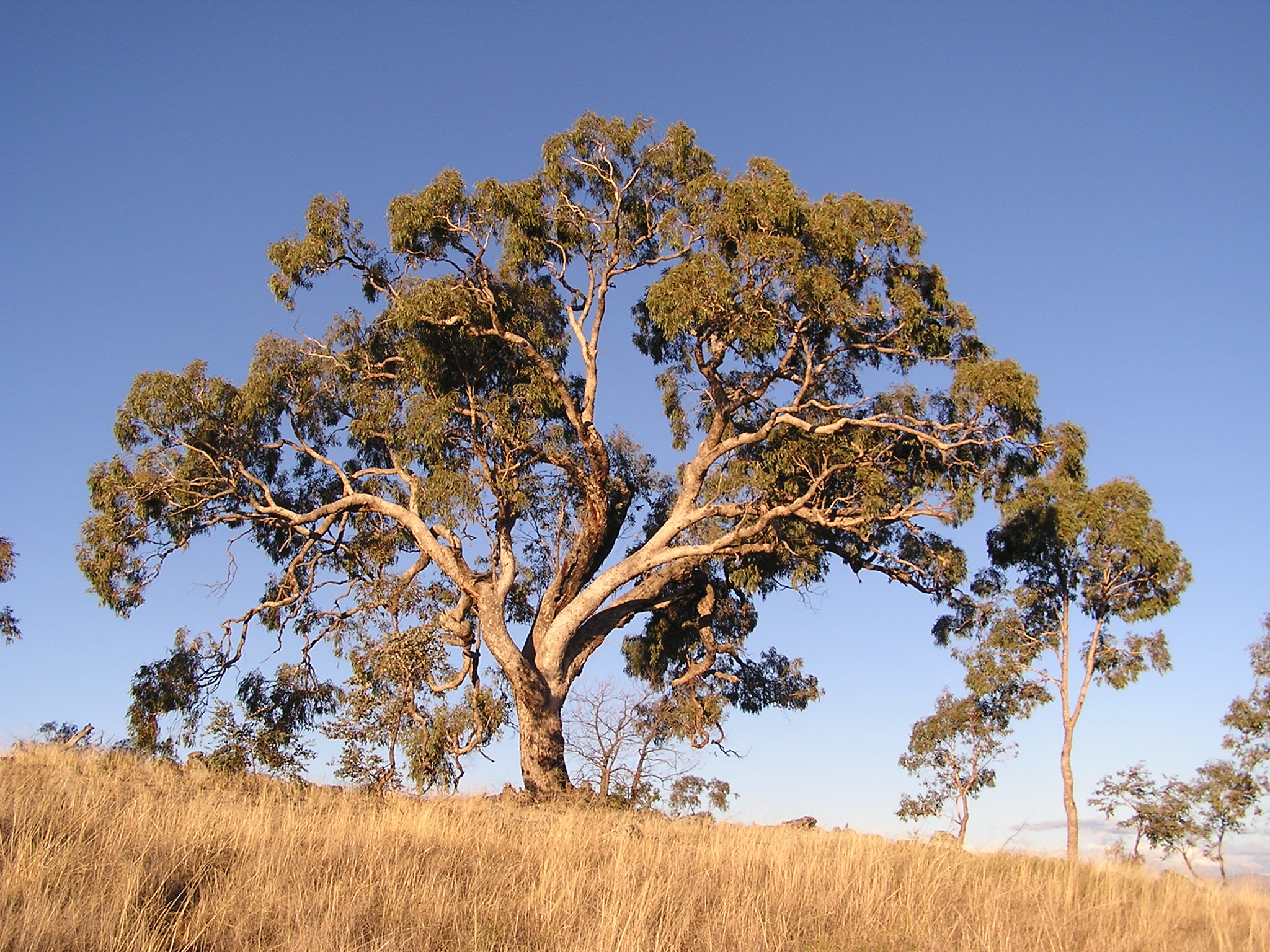
  Eucalyptus bridgesiana (Myrtaceae) on Red Hill, Australian Capital Territory
  - Ficus, Fig
  - Morus, Mulberry
- Myrtaceae (Myrtle family)
  - Eucalyptus, Eucalypt
  - Eugenia, Stopper etc.
  - Myrtus, Myrtle
  - Psidium, Guava
- Nothofagaceaed (Southern Beech family)
  - Nothofagus, Southern beech
- Nyssaceae (Tupelo family; sometimes included in Cornaceae)
  - Davidia involucrata, Dove tree
  - Nyssa, Tupelo
- Oleaceae (Olive family)
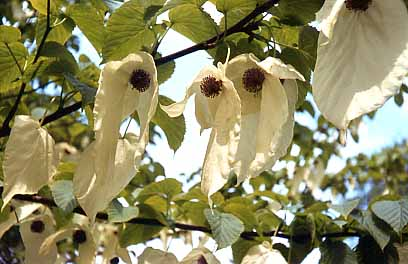
  Dove tree (Nyssaceae)
  - Fraxinus, Ash
  - Olea, Olive etc.
- Paulowniaceae (Paulownia family)
  - Paulownia, Foxglove Tree
- Platanaceae (Plane family)
  - Platanus, Plane
- Rhizophoraceae (Mangrove family)
  - Rhizophora, Red mangrove etc.
- Rosaceae (Rose family)

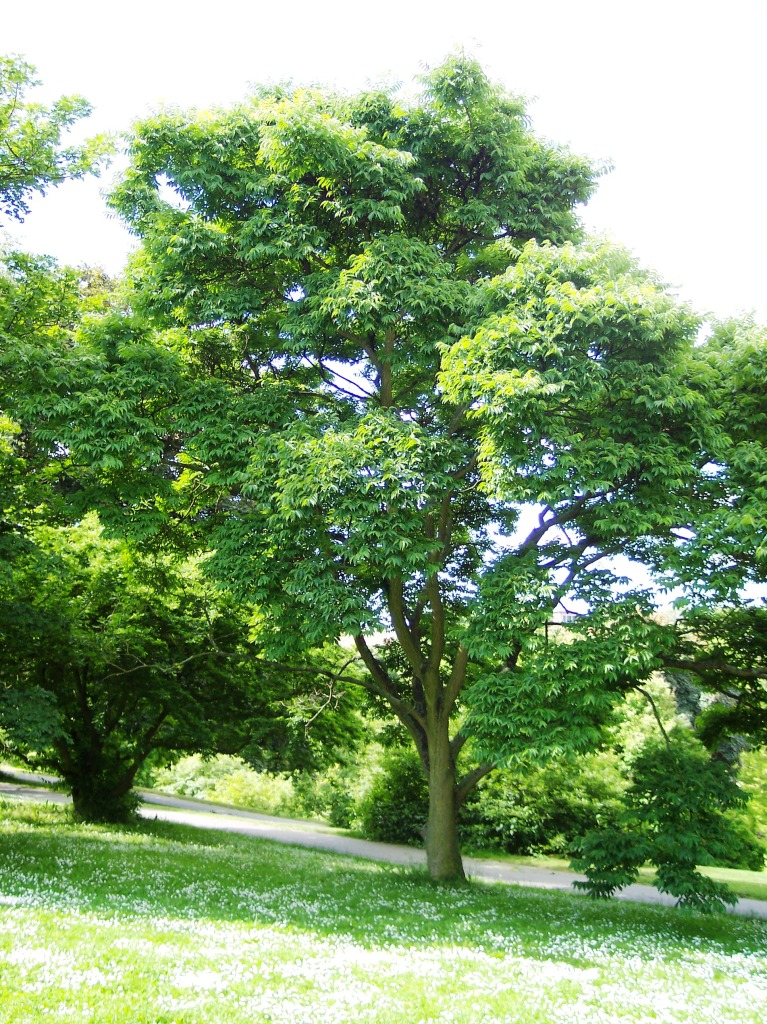
Phellodendron amurense (Rutaceae)

  - Crataegus, Hawthorn
  - Malus, Apple
  - Prunus, Almond, Peach, Apricot, Plums, Cherries etc.
  - Pyrus, Pear
  - Sorbus, Rowans, Whitebeams etc.
- Rubiaceae (Bedstraw family)
  - Coffea, Coffee
- Rutaceae (Rue family)
  - Citrus, Citrus
  - Phellodendron, Cork-tree
  - Tetradium, Euodia
- Salicaceae (Willow family)
  - Populus, Poplars and Aspens
  - Salix, Willow

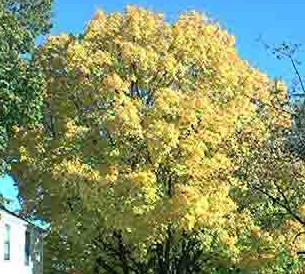
Yellow maple (Sapindaceae) in fall

- Sapindaceae (including Aceraceae, Hippocastanaceae) (Soapberry family)
  - Acer, Maple
  - Aesculus, Buckeye, Horse-chestnut
  - Koelreuteria, Golden rain tree
  - Litchi chinensis, Lychee
  - Ungnadia speciosa, Mexican Buckeye
- Sapotaceae (Sapodilla family)
  - Argania spinosa, Argan
  - Palaquium, Gutta-percha
  - Sideroxylon, Tambalacoque ("dodo tree") etc.

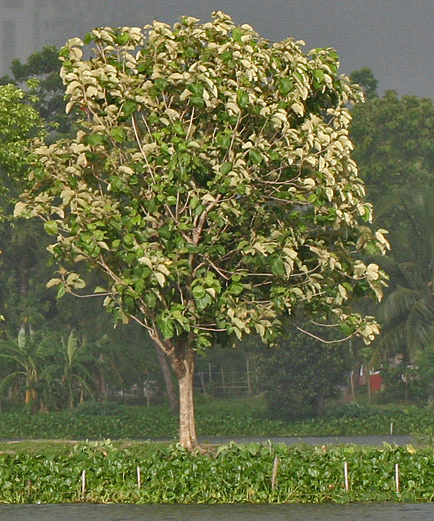
Common Teak (Tectona grandis, Verbenaceae) in Kolkata, India

- Family Simaroubaceae
  - Ailanthus, Tree of heaven
- Theaceae (Camellia family)
  - Gordonia, Gordonia
  - Stewartia, Stewartia
- Thymelaeaceae (Thymelaea family)
  - Gonystylus, Ramin
- Ulmaceae (Elm family)
  - Ulmus, Elm
  - Zelkova, Zelkova
- Viburnaceae (Viburnum family)
  - Sambucus, Elderberry
  - Viburnum, Viburnum

=== Monocotyledons ===
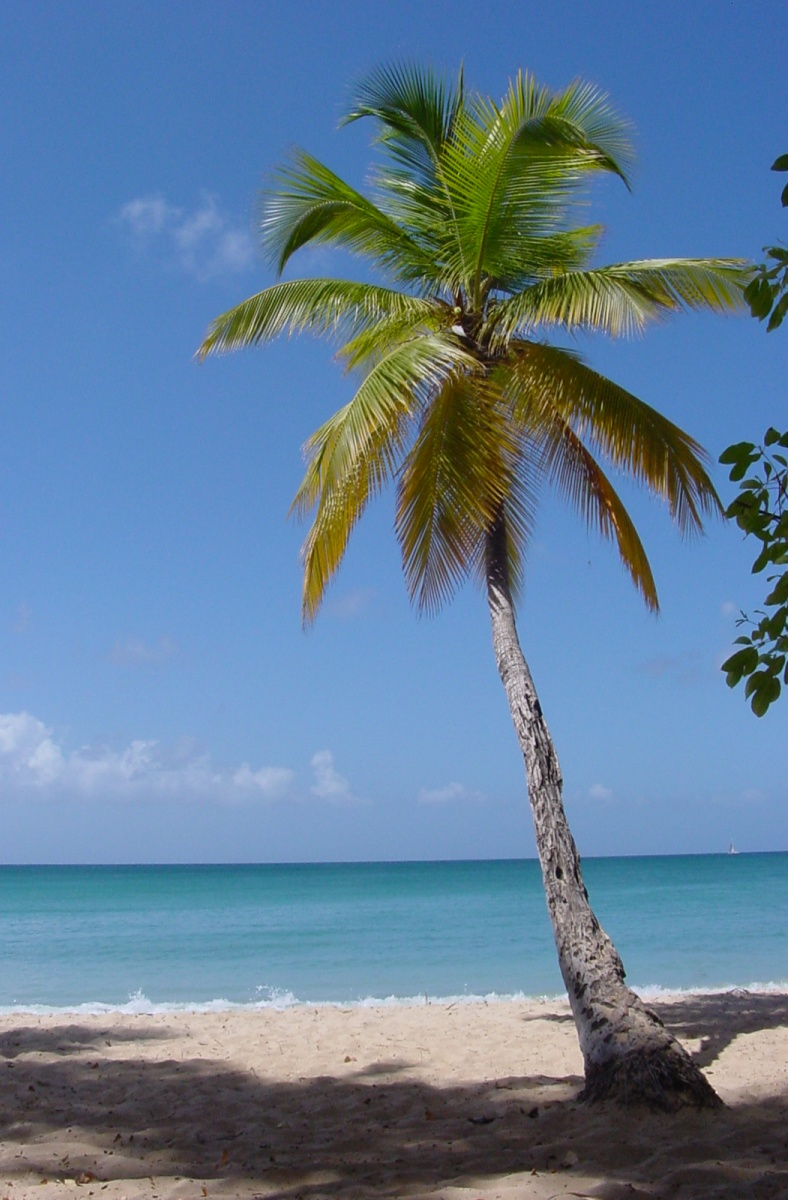
Coconut palm tree

About 10 Monocotyledon families include trees.

- Asparagaceae (Asparagus family)
  - Cordyline, Cabbage tree etc.
  - Dracaena, Dragon tree
  - Yucca, Joshua tree etc.
- Arecaceae (Palmae) (Palm family)
  - Areca, Areca
  - Cocos nucifera, Coconut
  - Phoenix, Date Palm etc.
  - Trachycarpus, Chusan Palm etc.
- Poaceae (grass family)
  - Bamboos, Poaceae subfamily Bambusoideae, around 92 genera
- Note that banana 'trees' are not actually trees; they are not woody nor is the stalk perennial.

=== Magnoliids ===
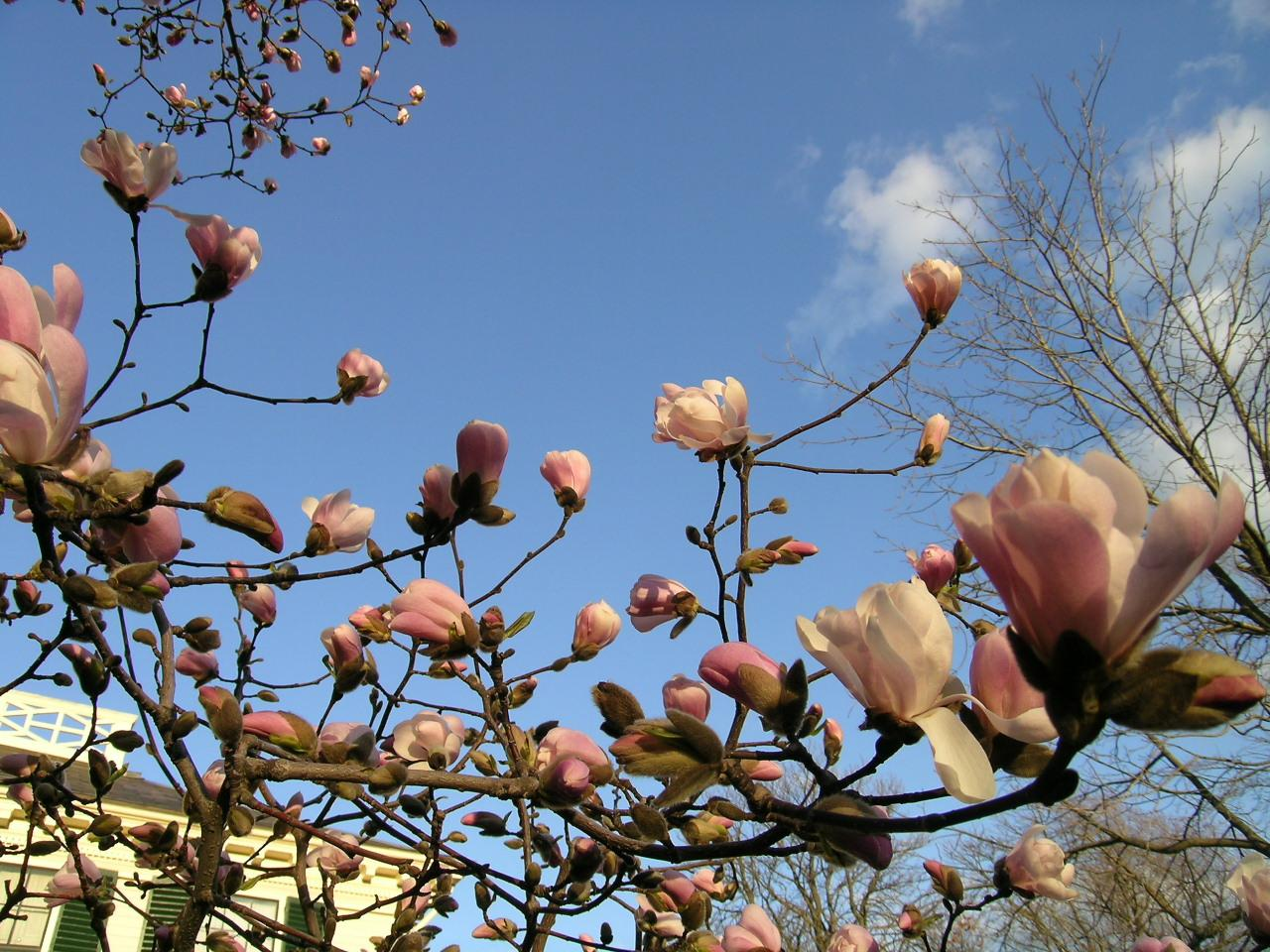
Flowering magnolias

17 magnoliid families include trees.

- Annonaceae (Custard apple family)
  - Annona, Cherimoya, Custard apple, Soursop etc.
  - Asimina, American Pawpaw
- Lauraceae (Laurel family)
  - Cinnamomum, Cinnamon etc.
  - Laurus, Bay Laurel etc.
  - Persea, Avocado etc.
  - Sassafras, Sassafras
- Magnoliaceae (Magnolia family)
  - Liriodendron, tulip tree
  - Magnolia, Magnolia
- Myristicaceae (Nutmeg family)
  - Myristica, Nutmeg

== Conifers ==
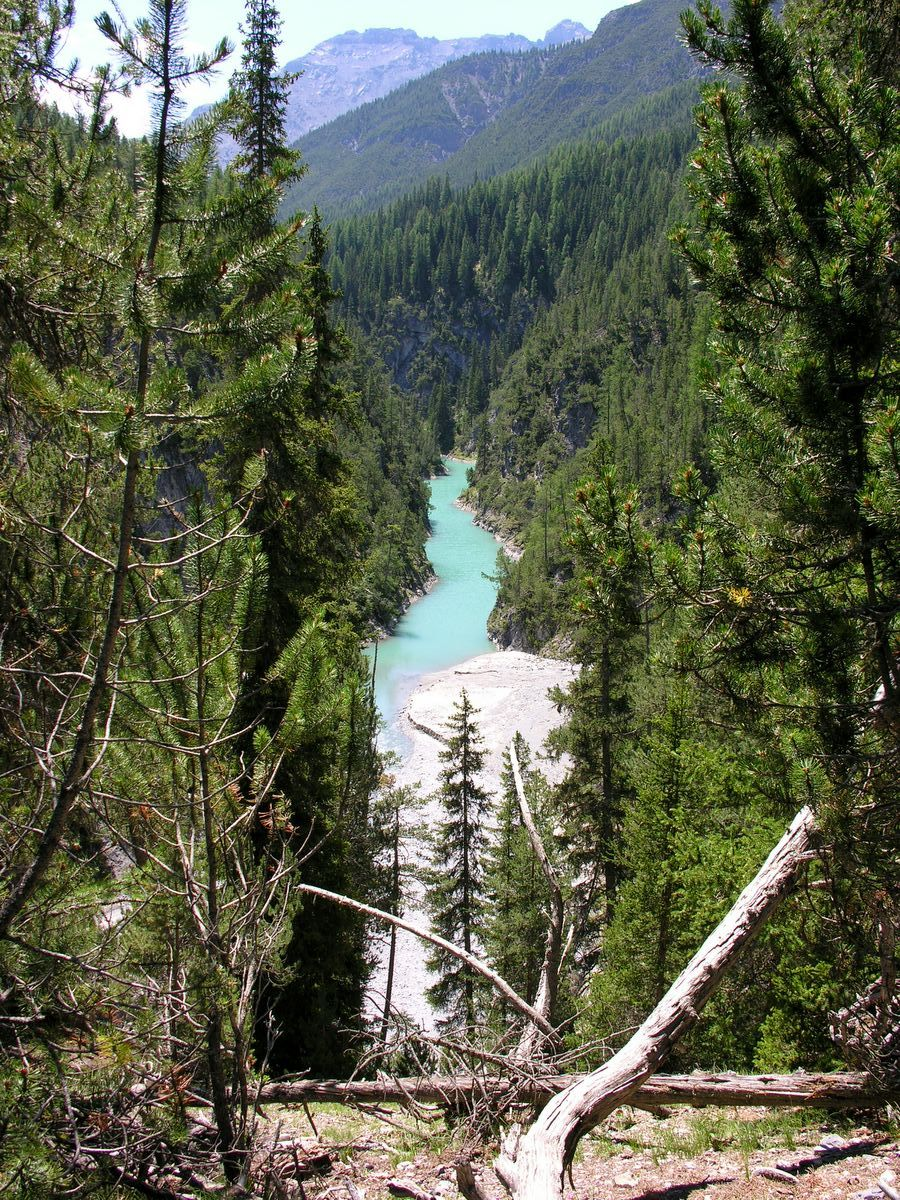
In the foreground Arolla Pines, in the background Norway Spruce

7 families, all of which include trees.

- Araucariaceae (Araucaria family)
  - Agathis, Kauri
  - Araucaria, Araucaria
  - Wollemia nobilis, Wollemia
- Cupressaceae (Cypress family)
  - Actinostrobus, Sandplain Cypress
  - Athrotaxis, Tasmanian Cedar
  - Austrocedrus chilensis, Cordilleran Cypress
  - Callitris, Cypress-Pine
  - Callitropsis nootkatensis, Nootka Cypress
  - Calocedrus, Incense-Cedar
  - Chamaecyparis, False Cypress
  - Cryptomeria japonica, Sugi
  - Cupressus, Old World Cypress
  - Fitzroya cupressoides, Alerce or Patagonian cypress
  - Fokienia hodginsii, Fujian Cypress
  - Glyptostrobus pensilis, Chinese Swamp Cypress
  - Hesperocyparis, New World Cypress
  - Juniperus, Juniper
  - Libocedrus, New Zealand Cedars, etc.
  - Metasequoia glyptostroboides, Dawn Redwood
  - Papuacedrus papuana
  - Pilgerodendron uviferum, Guaitecas Cypress
  - Platycladus orientalis, Chinese Arborvitae
  - Sequoia sempervirens, Coast Redwood
  - Sequoiadendron giganteum, Giant Sequoia
  - Taiwania cryptomerioides
  - Taxodium, Bald Cypress
  - Tetraclinis articulata, Sandarac
  - Thuja
  - Thujopsis dolabrata, Hiba
  - Xanthocyparis vietnamensis, Vietnamese Golden Cypress
  - Widdringtonia, African Cypress
- Pinaceae (Pine family)
  - Abies, Fir
  - Cathaya argyrophylla, Cathay Silver Fir
  - Cedrus, Cedar
  - Keteleeria
  - Larix, Larch
  - Nothotsuga longibracteata, Bristlecone Hemlock
  - Picea, Spruce
  - Pinus, Pine
  - Pseudolarix amabilis, Golden Larch
  - Pseudotsuga, Douglas-fir
  - Tsuga, Hemlock

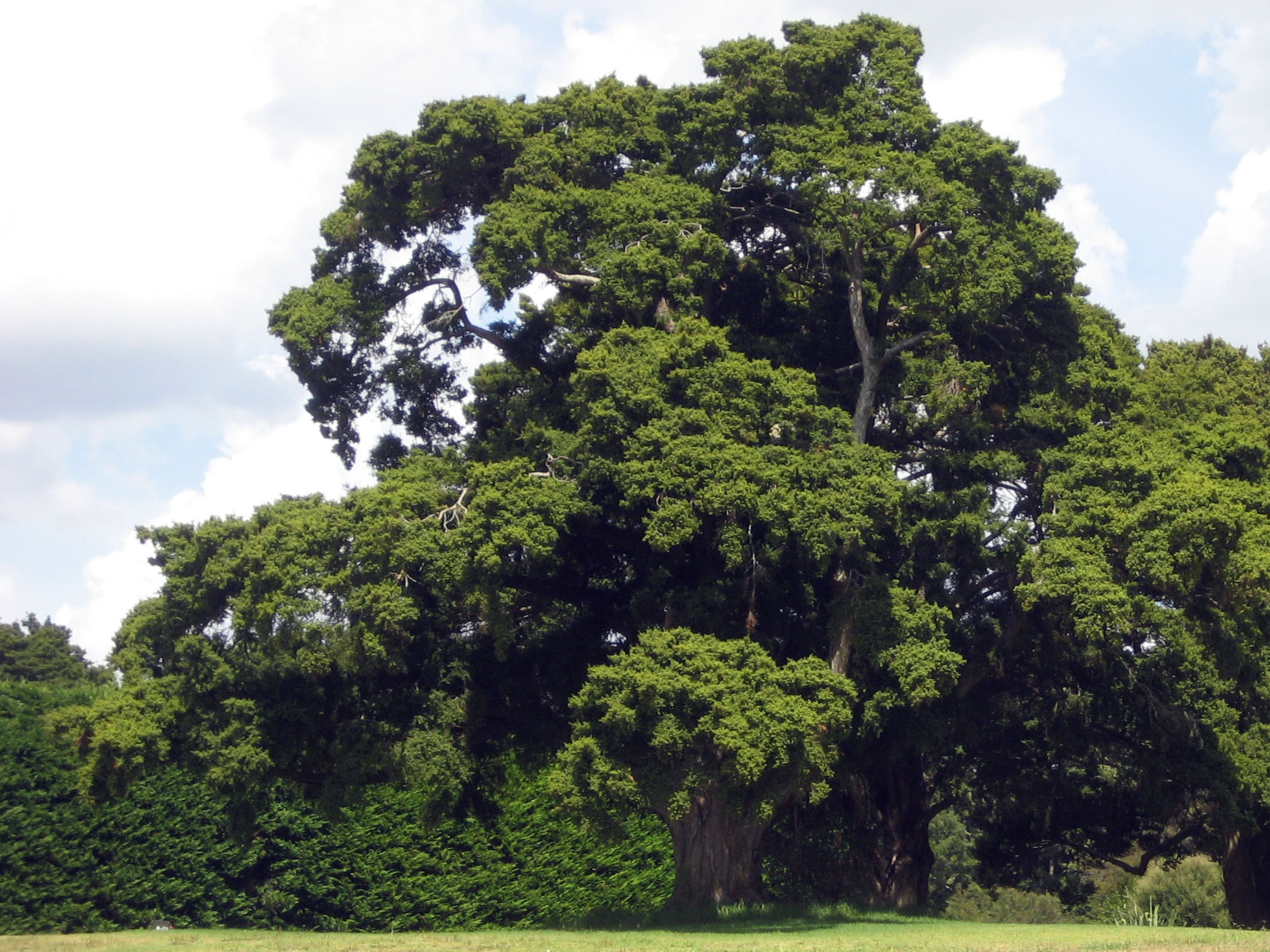
Podocarpus totara (Podocarpaceae) in New Zealand

- Podocarpaceae (Yellowwood family)
  - Acmopyle
  - Afrocarpus, African Yellowwood etc.
  - Dacrycarpus, Kahikatea etc.
  - Dacrydium, Rimu etc.
  - Falcatifolium
  - Halocarpus
  - Lagarostrobos franklinii, Huon pine
  - Lepidothamnus
  - Manoao colensoi, Manoao
  - Nageia, Asian Bayberry etc.
  - Pectinopitys, Miro etc.
  - Phyllocladus, Celery Pine
  - Podocarpus, Totara etc.
  - Prumnopitys, Mataī etc.
  - Retrophyllum
  - Saxegothaea conspicua, Mañío Hembra
  - Sundacarpus amarus
- Family Sciadopityaceae
  - Sciadopitys verticillata, Kusamaki
- Taxaceae (Yew family)
  - Amentotaxus, Catkin-Yew
  - Austrotaxus spicata, New Caledonia Yew
  - Cephalotaxus, Plum Yew
  - Pseudotaxus chienii, Whiteberry Yew
  - Taxus, Yew
  - Torreya, Nutmeg Yew

== Ginkgos ==
Only one species.

- Ginkgoaceae (Ginkgo family)
  - Ginkgo biloba

== Cycads ==
Both families of cycads include trees.

- Cycadaceae (Cycad family)
  - Cycas, Ngathu cycad etc.
- Zamiaceae (Zamia family)
  - Lepidozamia, Wunu cycad etc.

== Ferns ==
Tree ferns are not true trees - their "trunks" are not composed of true secondary growth, but instead of roots and rhizomes.

- Cyatheaceae
  - Cyathea
- Dicksoniaceae
  - Dicksonia

== See also ==
- List of trees and shrubs by taxonomic family
- List of Clusiaceae genera
- Wattieza
