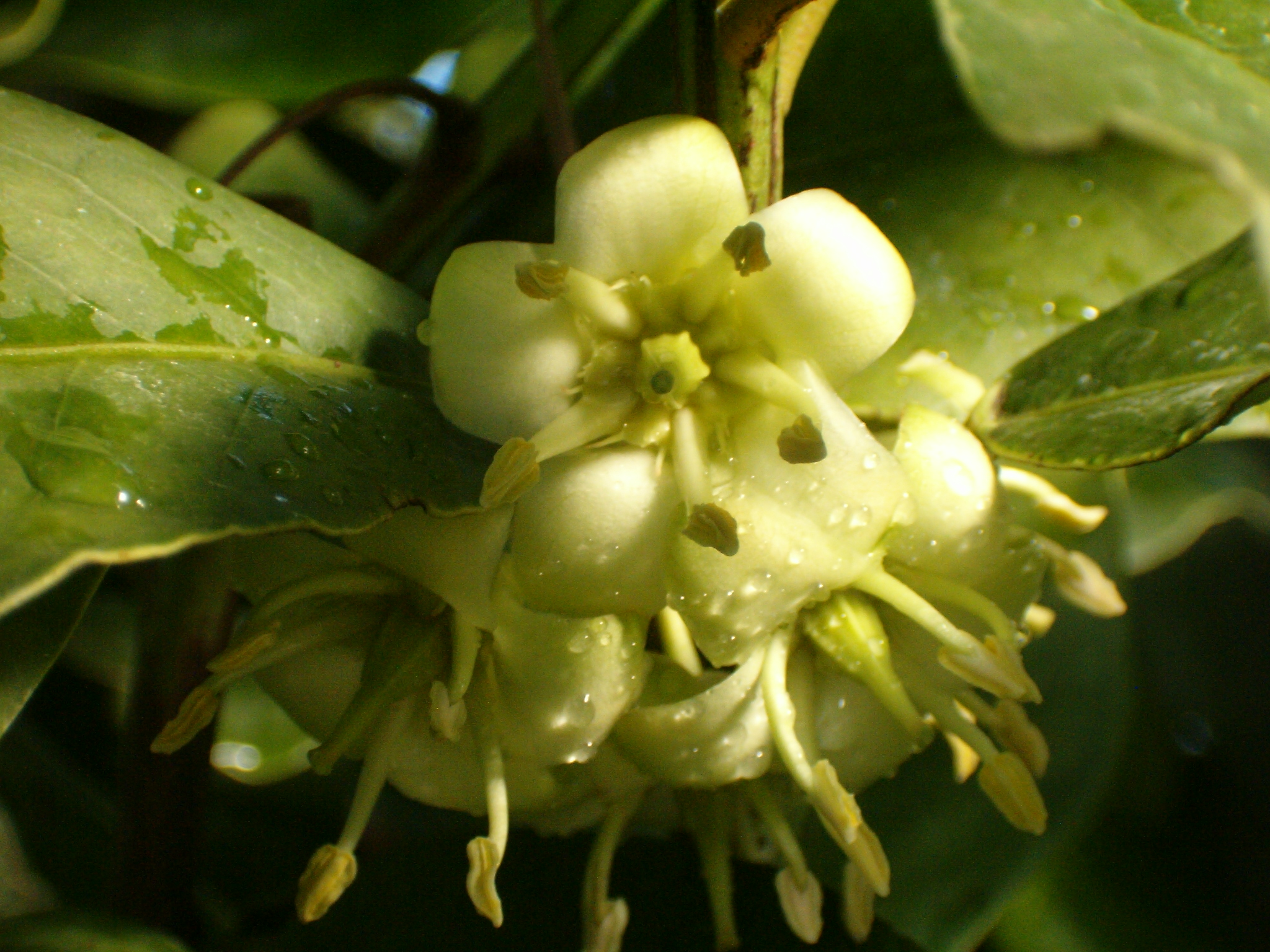
- Brexia madagascariensis, ↑flower, ↓leaves of a young plant
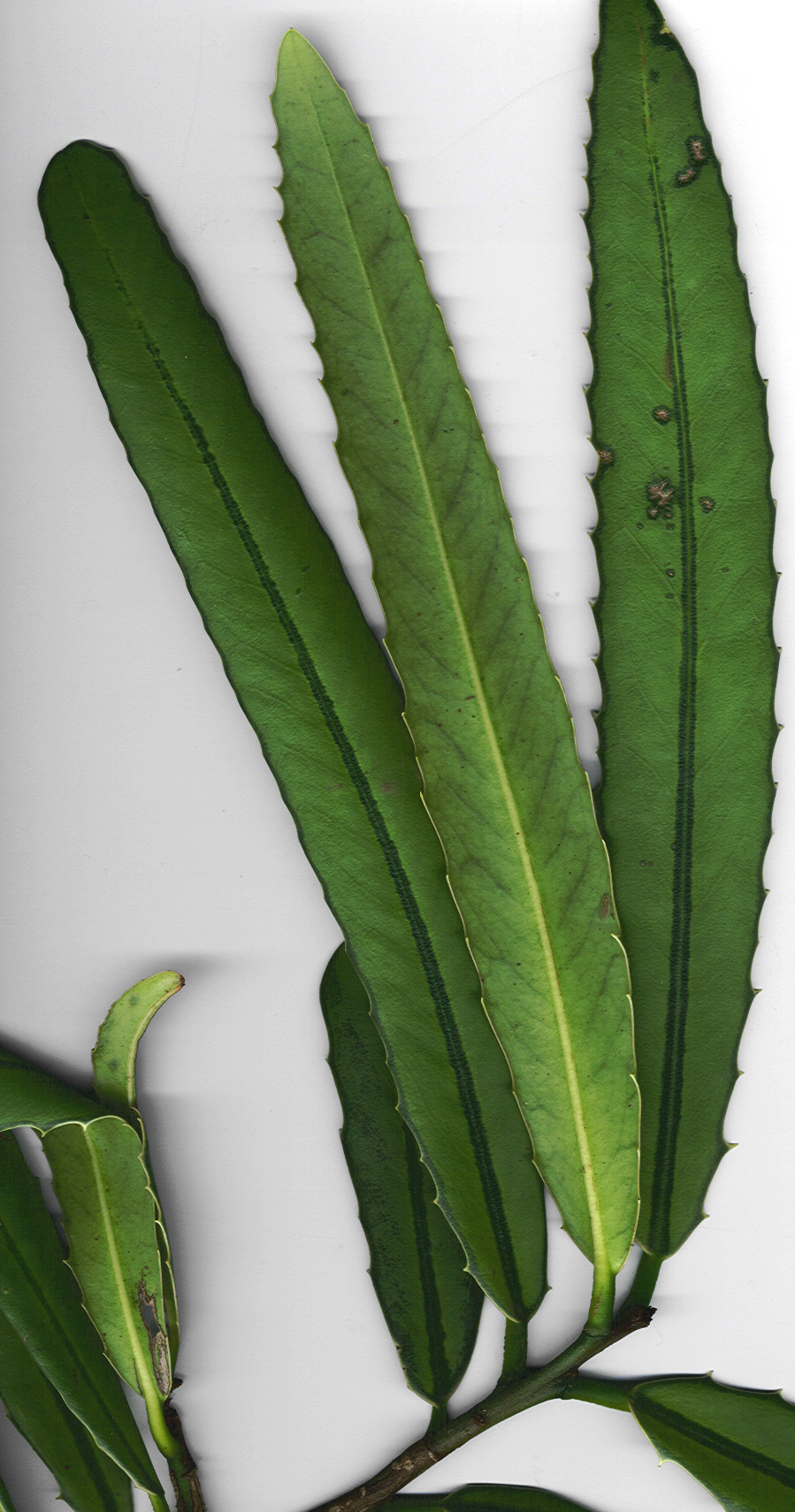

Scientific classification
- Kingdom: Plantae
- Clade: Tracheophytes
- Clade: Angiosperms
- Clade: Eudicots
- Clade: Rosids
- Order: Celastrales
- Family: Celastraceae
- Genus: Brexia; Noronha ex Thouars

Species
- Brexia alaticarpa G.E.Schatz & Lowry; Brexia australis G.E.Schatz & Lowry; Brexia humbertii H.Perrier; Brexia madagascariensis (Lam.) Ker Gawl. type species; Brexia marioniae G.E.Schatz & Lowry; Brexia montana H.Perrier

Synonyms
- Thomassettia Hemsl.; Venana Lam.

= Brexia =

Shrub or tree genus

Brexia is a genus of flowering plants assigned to the Celastraceae. It includes several species of dense evergreen shrubs or small trees of usually around 5 m high, with alternately set, simple, leathery leaves with a short leaf stem and lanceolate to inverted egg-shaped leaf blades. The pentamerous flowers occur in cymes. The petals are greenish white, the stamens are alternating with wide, incised staminodes. The superior ovary develops in a long-ribbed fruit. Brexia naturally grows on the coast of East Africa, on Madagascar, the Comoros and Seychelles. Opinions differ about the number of species in Brexia. Sometimes the genus is regarded monotypic, B. madagascariensis being a species with a large variability, but other authors distinguish as many as twelve species. Common names for B. madagascariensis include jobiapototra, tsimiranjana, tsivavena, vahilava, voalava, voankatanana, voantalanina, voatalanina and votalanina (all Malagasy), and mfukufuku (Swahili), mfurugudu (Shambala, Tanzania) and bwa kato (Seychelles).

== Description ==
=== Stems and leaves ===
Brexia is a shrub or small tree, usually 3–7, but occasionally up to 10 m high with many branches, that are smooth with ridges early on but later become cylindrical. The leaves are evergreen, with a leaf stem mostly 1–2 cm long, but sometimes very short. The leathery leaf blades are between 3 1/2 and 50 cm long and 2 and 11 cm wide, with large differences in shape, narrowly inverted egg-shaped to linear with teeth or even spines along the edges in young growth, while on mature shoots they may be narrow to broadly inverted egg-shaped and the edge toothy to entire, with a rounded to indented tip, and wedged along the leaf stem or rounded at the base. The stipulations are very narrow.

=== Flowers ===
Each inflorescence may consist of usually between three and twelve flowers, but may occasionally contain as few as one and as many as seventeen flowers, usually on a flattened 1 1/2−5 mm wide common stem of up to 9 cm long, and growing from a leaf axil, but in some forms on thick branches or the trunk (so-called cauliflory). Sometimes near the tip are one or two persistent leaf-like bracteoles of about 1 cm, but mostly the small scale-like bracteoles fall off quickly. Individual flowers are on stems of up to 2 mm long. Each flower has five sepals of about 2 1/2 × 3 1/2–4 mm, the lower half of which are fused, the free tips short triangular with a rounded tip and an entire edge. The five fleshy petals are greenish or creamy white, 1 1/4–1 3/4 × 7/8–1 1/4 cm, broadly inverted egg-shaped, with a blunt tip. The five stamens have filaments of about 1 1/4 mm thick, and are topped by anthers of 5 × 2 1/2 mm. Alternating with the stamens are mostly unequally incised staminodes with three to five incisions. The superior ovary has five sides and is 8–10 mm high including the style.

=== Fruit and seed ===
The fully grown fruit is a drupe of 4–10 × 2–3 cm, ovoid to cylindric, with five prominent ribs, with the mesocarp initially woody but supposedly pulpy and edible when fully ripe. It contains brown or almost black, finely wrinkled, irregularly compressed, oval, keeled seeds of 4 1/2–7 1/2 × 3–3 1/2 mm.

=== Differences with other genera ===
Brexia has been assumed to be closely related to Escallonia. These two genera however differ in many details of the sporogenesis, gametogenesis and fertilisation, such as the ripe pollen which is two-celled in Escallonia and three-celled in Brexia.

== Taxonomy ==
Brexia is a deviant genus, that was assigned early on to the Brexiaceae or Brexioideae, together with two other enigmatic, monotypic genera, Ixerba and Roussea. The common characters between these taxa are few and are shared with many other Pentapetalae. These common characteristics include that they are all small trees or shrubs with simple leathery evergreen leaves, with an entire or serrated margin, and pentamerous flowers set individually or in cymes in the axil of the leaves. Botanists have differed on the rank and placement of these three genera. They have by some authors also been assigned to the Escalloniaceae, Saxifragaceae, Grossulariaceae, and the Hydrangeaceae. Genetic data indicate that the three genera are not each other's closest relatives, in fact are not closely related at all. Ixerba has now been included in the Strasburgeriaceae. Roussea is most related to Carpodetus, Cuttsia and Abrophyllum, that are nowadays combined in the family Rousseaceae, the sister group of the Campanulaceae, and together representing the basic branches of the Asterales. Brexia is closely related to the large Celastraceae genera Pleurostylia and Elaeodendron.

=== Taxonomic history ===
Francisco Noronha described the genus Brexia before his death in 1788, although this name was only properly published by Thouars in 1806. Jean-Baptiste Lamarck described the same species as Venana madagascariensis in 1797. In 1823, John Bellenden Ker Gawler assigned this taxon to Brexia, creating the combination Brexia madagascariensis. Later, Brexia (the nomen conservandum) was given priority over Venana (nomen rejectum). In 1902, William Hemsley described Thomassetia seychellarum based on a specimen from the Seychelles, but this name was later synonymised with Brexia madagascariensis.

=== Modern classification ===
Brexia is together with Polycardia sister to a clade containing Elaeodendron and Pleurostylia, and less related to the other Celastraceae. Opinions differ about the number of species in Brexia. Sometimes B. madagascariensis is regarded as a species with a large variability, but other authors distinguish as many as twelve species. Populations outside Madagascar are sometimes regarded as separate taxa. Those on the coast of continental Africa with inflorescences that have few flowers and large fruits are referred to as var. mossambicensis, while those growing at higher elevations on the Seychelles characterised by small pinkish petals and small fruits are separated as B. madagascariensis ssp. microcarpa or alternatively B. microcarpa. B. madagascariensis is also spread along the East coast of Madagascar. All other putative taxa occur in Madagascar only, mostly with very limited distributions.

Plants of the World Online accepts six species:

- Brexia alaticarpa G.E.Schatz & Lowry, with three to five flowers per cyme, with petiolate, narrow to lanceolate leaves with entire, rolled-down margins and a rounded tip, and conspicuously winged fruits (former Toamasina Province).
- Brexia australis G.E.Schatz & Lowry, with one or two flowers per cyme, leaves mostly sessile and only up to 12 cm (coastal Anosy Region).
- Brexia humbertii H.Perrier, central and eastern Madagascar
- Brexia madagascariensis (Lam.) Ker Gawl., Aldabra, Comoros, Madagascar, Mozambique, Seychelles, eastern Tanzania including the Zanzibar Archipelago
- Brexia marioniae G.E.Schatz & Lowry, with inflorescences on the branches, and staminodes with entire margins or ending in two or three shallow teeth (former Antsiranana and Toamasina Provinces).
- Brexia montana H.Perrier, central and east-central Madagascar

=== Phylogeny ===
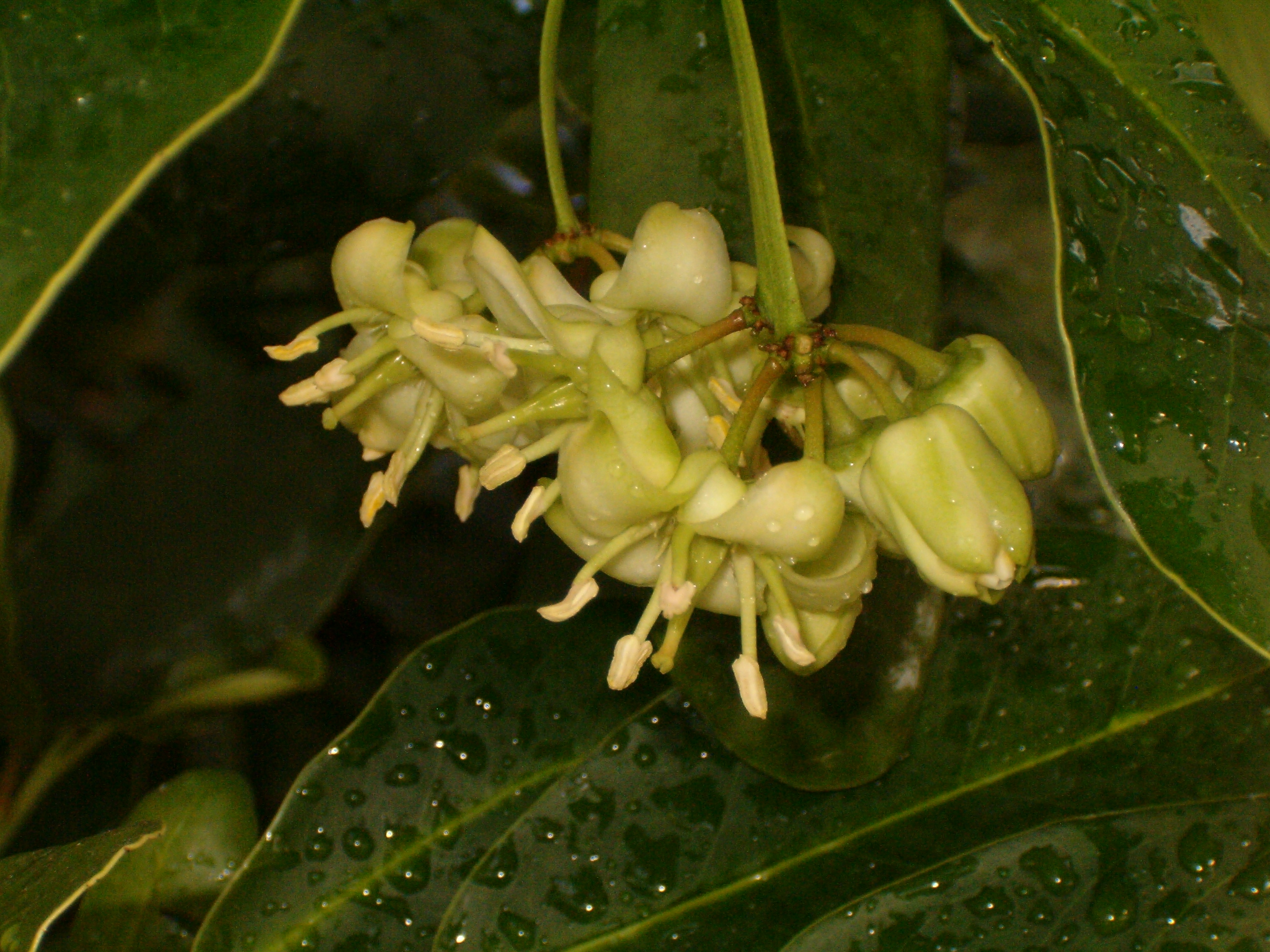
B. madagascariensis showing entire leaf margins of adult branches, distinctly flattened petioles and minute brachteoles

Modern genetic analysis results in the following relationship tree.

- - - - Polycardia
      - - - Brexia montana
          - Brexia australis
        - - Brexia humbertii
          - Brexia madagascariensis
    - - - Brexiella/Evonymopsis
        - Elaeodendron/Pseudocatha
      - - Halleriopsis
        - - Erythrostegia
          - - Astrocassine
            - - Salvadoropsis
              - - Pleurostylia
                - - Hartogiopsis
                  - Macrynodrys
  - - Lophopetalum
    - Kokoona

=== Etymology ===
Brexia is derived from the Greek word βρέχω (brecho) "to rain", and refers to the large leathery leaves that are impervious to rain.

== Distribution ==
B. madagascariensis is a widespread species found in coastal areas in Madagascar (Sava, Atsinanana, Analanjirofo, Vatovavy-Fitovinany, Atsimo-Atsinanana, and Anosy regions), Mozambique, Tanzania (including Zanzibar), and Comoro Islands. The populations of Brexia that occur at higher elevations in the Seychelles are sometimes regarded as a distinct subspecies B. madagascariensis ssp. microcarpa, but others view it as a separate species B. microcarpa. All other putative species are endemics of Madagascar.

== Ecology ==
During the night, nectar is produced and stored in the cup of the flower. This is commonly associated with flowers specialising in pollination by bats. Common brown lemurs Eulemur fulvus were seen fouraging from Brexia flowers in the early morning. These primates took the inflorescences with their hands and bent these to lick the nectar from the flower cups. This was repeated in other nearby specimens of Brexia immediately after. Flowers were not damaged, and it is likely the lemurs assisted the pollination. B. madagascariensis grows in coastal vegetations on a range of soil types such as coral, sand, loam or coarse rocky ground, in places like the edges of saline water swamp forest, mangrove swamps, evergreen shrubland and other forest types near the sea. In Tanzania it has been found in an almost pure stand of Maesopsis eminii. The fruit can float in sea water for many months and the numerous dark seeds within remain viable.

== Use ==
Fruits can be eaten raw as pulp when fully ripe. The wood can be used for spoons and tool handles, poles and yokes, but also provides fire wood and can be made into charcoal. A potion to treat stomach-ache can be produced by boiling the roots.
