= Goniodiscus (disambiguation) =

Goniodiscus may refer to:

- Goniodiscus, a genus of plants in the family Celastraceae
- Goniodiscus or Gonyodiscus, a genus of gastropods, synonym of Discus
- Goniodiscus, a genus of echinoderms in the family Oreasteridae, synonym of Culcita
- Goniodiscus, an extinct genus of trilobites in the family Calodiscidae, synonym of Calodiscus
