= Menepetalum =

Scientific classification
- Kingdom: Plantae
- Clade: Tracheophytes
- Clade: Angiosperms
- Clade: Eudicots
- Clade: Rosids
- Order: Celastrales
- Family: Celastraceae
- Genus: Menepetalum; Loes.

Genus of shrubs

Menepetalum is a genus of shrubs and small trees in the family Celastraceae. The genus is endemic to New Caledonia in the Pacific and contains four species. Its closest relative is Dinghoua from Australia.

== List of species ==
- Menepetalum cassinoides Loes.
- Menepetalum cathioides Loes.
- Menepetalum salicifolium Loes.
- Menepetalum schlechteri Loes.
