= Hylenaea praecelsa =

Scientific classification
- Kingdom: Plantae
- Clade: Tracheophytes
- Clade: Angiosperms
- Clade: Eudicots
- Clade: Rosids
- Order: Celastrales
- Family: Celastraceae
- Genus: Hylenaea
- Species: H. praecelsa

Binomial name
- Hylenaea praecelsa (Miers) A.C.Sm.

Synonyms
- Homotypic Synonyms: Salacia praecelsa (Miers) Standl.; Tyloderma praecelsa Miers

Species of plant

Hylenaea praecelsa is a species of flowering plant in the family Celastraceae, native to Costa Rica, Panama, western South America, northern Brazil, French Guiana, and Suriname. A climber, it has large seeds that are dropped in the dry season.
