= Acanthothamnus =

Scientific classification
- Kingdom: Plantae
- Clade: Tracheophytes
- Clade: Angiosperms
- Clade: Eudicots
- Clade: Rosids
- Order: Celastrales
- Family: Celastraceae
- Genus: Acanthothamnus; Brandegee, 1909
- Species: A. aphyllus

Binomial name
- Acanthothamnus aphyllus (Schltdl.) Standl.

Synonyms
- Scandivepres Loes. (1910); Acanthothamnus viridis Brandegee (1909); Celastrus aphyllus Schltdl. (1841); Scandivepres mexicanus Loes. (1910)

Genus of flowering plants

Acanthothamnus is a monotypic genus in the family Celastraceae which contains only the species Acanthothamnus aphyllus. The genus is sometimes known by the unaccepted synonym Scandivepres and its natural range spans central Mexico.

== Taxonomy ==
Acanthothamnus is most closely related to the genera Brexia and Canotia.
