= Ptelidium =

Scientific classification
- Kingdom: Plantae
- Clade: Tracheophytes
- Clade: Angiosperms
- Clade: Eudicots
- Clade: Rosids
- Order: Celastrales
- Family: Celastraceae
- Genus: Ptelidium; Thouars

Synonyms
- Seringia Spreng.

Genus of plants

Ptelidium is a genus of flowering plants belonging to the family Celastraceae. Its native range is Madagascar.

Two species are accepted:

- Ptelidium ovatum (Lour.) Poir.
- Ptelidium scandens H.Perrier
