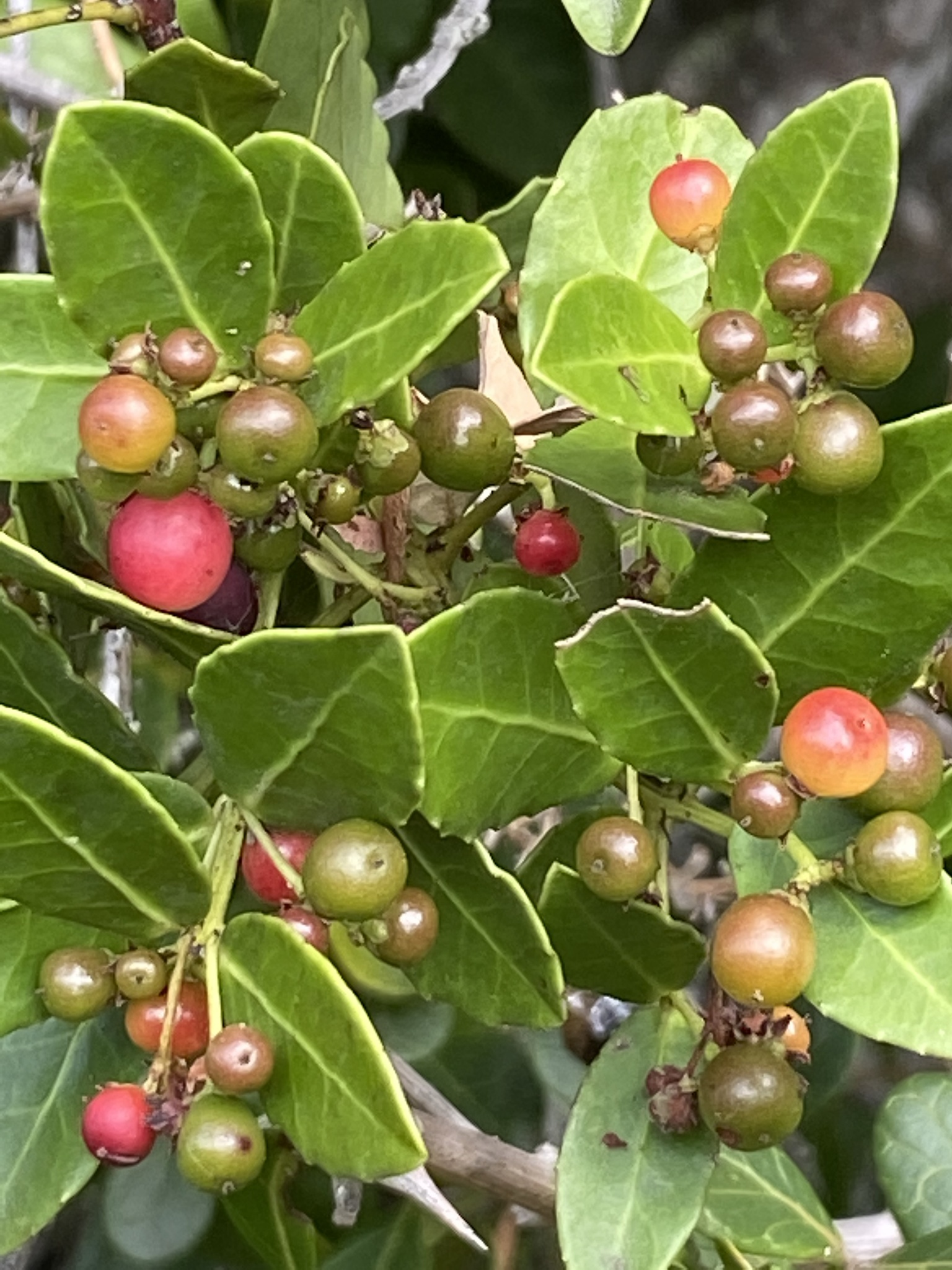
- Lauridia tetragona

Scientific classification
- Kingdom: Plantae
- Clade: Tracheophytes
- Clade: Angiosperms
- Clade: Eudicots
- Clade: Rosids
- Order: Celastrales
- Family: Celastraceae
- Genus: Lauridia; Eckl. & Zeyh.

= Lauridia =

Genus of plants

Lauridia is a genus of flowering plants belonging to the family Celastraceae.

Its native range is Southern Africa.

Species:

- Lauridia reticulata Eckl. & Zeyh.
- Lauridia tetragona (L.f.) R.H.Archer
