= Monimopetalum =

Scientific classification
- Kingdom: Plantae
- Clade: Tracheophytes
- Clade: Angiosperms
- Clade: Eudicots
- Clade: Rosids
- Order: Celastrales
- Family: Celastraceae
- Genus: Monimopetalum; Rehder
- Species: M. chinense

Binomial name
- Monimopetalum chinense Rehder

Genus of plants

Monimopetalum is a monotypic genus of flowering plants belonging to the family Celastraceae. The only species is Monimopetalum chinense.

Its native range is China.
