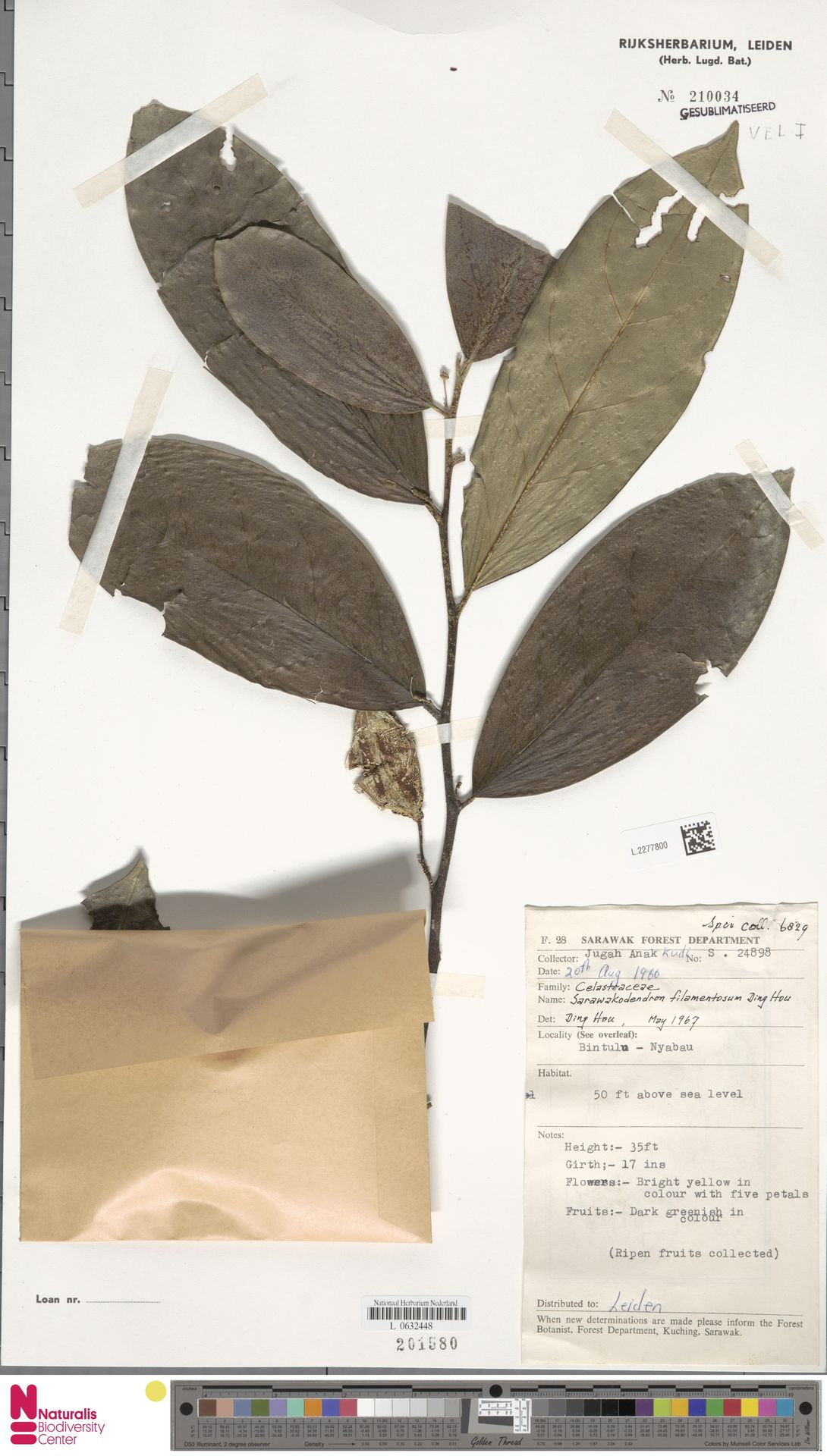

Conservation status
- Endangered (IUCN 3.1)

Scientific classification
- Kingdom: Plantae
- Clade: Tracheophytes
- Clade: Angiosperms
- Clade: Eudicots
- Clade: Rosids
- Order: Celastrales
- Family: Celastraceae
- Genus: Sarawakodendron; Ding Hou
- Species: S. filamentosum

Binomial name
- Sarawakodendron filamentosum Ding Hou

= Sarawakodendron =

Genus of trees

Sarawakodendron is a genus of plants in the family Celastraceae. The sole species in the genus is Sarawakodendron filamentosum, a tree endemic to Borneo where it is confined to Sarawak.
