= Trochantha =

Scientific classification
- Kingdom: Plantae
- Clade: Tracheophytes
- Clade: Angiosperms
- Clade: Eudicots
- Clade: Rosids
- Order: Celastrales
- Family: Celastraceae
- Genus: Trochantha (N.Hallé) R.H.Archer

Genus of flowering plants

Trochantha is a genus of flowering plants belonging to the family Celastraceae.

Its native range is Western Central Tropical Africa to Tanzania and Angola.

Species:

- Trochantha graciliflora (Welw. ex Oliv.) R.H.Archer
- Trochantha preussii (Loes.) R.H.Archer
