= Fraunhofera =

Scientific classification
- Kingdom: Plantae
- Clade: Embryophytes
- Clade: Tracheophytes
- Clade: Spermatophytes
- Clade: Angiosperms
- Clade: Eudicots
- Clade: Rosids
- Order: Celastrales
- Family: Celastraceae
- Genus: Fraunhofera; Mart.
- Species: F. multiflora

Binomial name
- Fraunhofera multiflora Mart.

Genus of flowering plants

Fraunhofera is a genus of flowering plants in the family Celastraceae. It has only one species, Fraunhofera multiflora, called pau branco, which is a Brazilian endemic. Found in deciduous forests of Brazil, they are little-studied shrubs or trees, and only immature fruit have ever been observed.
