= Tetrasiphon =

Conservation status
- Endangered (IUCN 2.3)

Scientific classification
- Kingdom: Plantae
- Clade: Tracheophytes
- Clade: Angiosperms
- Clade: Eudicots
- Clade: Rosids
- Order: Celastrales
- Family: Celastraceae
- Genus: Tetrasiphon; Urb.
- Species: T. jamaicensis

Binomial name
- Tetrasiphon jamaicensis Urb.

Genus of flowering plants

Tetrasiphon is a monotypic genus of flowering plants in the family Celastraceae containing the single species Tetrasiphon jamaicensis. It is a tree endemic to Jamaica.
