= Torralbasia =

Scientific classification
- Kingdom: Plantae
- Clade: Tracheophytes
- Clade: Angiosperms
- Clade: Eudicots
- Clade: Rosids
- Order: Celastrales
- Family: Celastraceae
- Genus: Torralbasia; Krug & Urb.
- Species: T. cuneifolia

Binomial name
- Torralbasia cuneifolia (C.Wright ex A.Gray) Krug & Urb.

Synonyms
- Celastrus cuneifolius (C.Wright ex A.Gray) M.Gómez; Euonymus cuneifolius C.Wright ex Griseb.; Maytenus cuneifolia (C.Wright ex A.Gray) Griseb.

Species of flowering plant

Torralbasia is a monotypic genus of flowering plants belonging to the family Celastraceae. It only contains the one known species, Torralbasia cuneifolia (C.Wright ex A.Gray) Krug & Urb.

It is native to the Caribbean and is found in the countries of Cuba, Dominican Republic and Puerto Rico.

The genus name of Torralbasia is in honour of José Ildefonso Torralbas (1842–1903), Cuban botanist and agronomist; director of the university botanical museum in Havana and professor at the university. The Latin specific epithet of cuneifolia means wedge-shaped, and is derived from cuneate. Both the genus and the species were first described and published in D.H.Segui, Fl. Med. Tox. Cuba on page 60 in 1900.

There are 3 accepted subspecies;

- Torralbasia cuneifolia subsp. cuneifolia
- Torralbasia cuneifolia var. rotundata Borhidi
- Torralbasia cuneifolia subsp. verrucosa Borhidi
