= Xylonymus =

Scientific classification
- Kingdom: Plantae
- Clade: Tracheophytes
- Clade: Angiosperms
- Clade: Eudicots
- Clade: Rosids
- Order: Celastrales
- Family: Celastraceae
- Genus: Xylonymus; Kalkman ex Ding Hou (1963)
- Species: X. versteeghii

Binomial name
- Xylonymus versteeghii Kalkman (1963)

Genus of flowering plants

Xylonymus versteeghii is a species of flowering plant belonging to the family Celastraceae. It is the sole species in genus Xylonymus. It is a shrub or tree native to Maluku and New Guinea.
