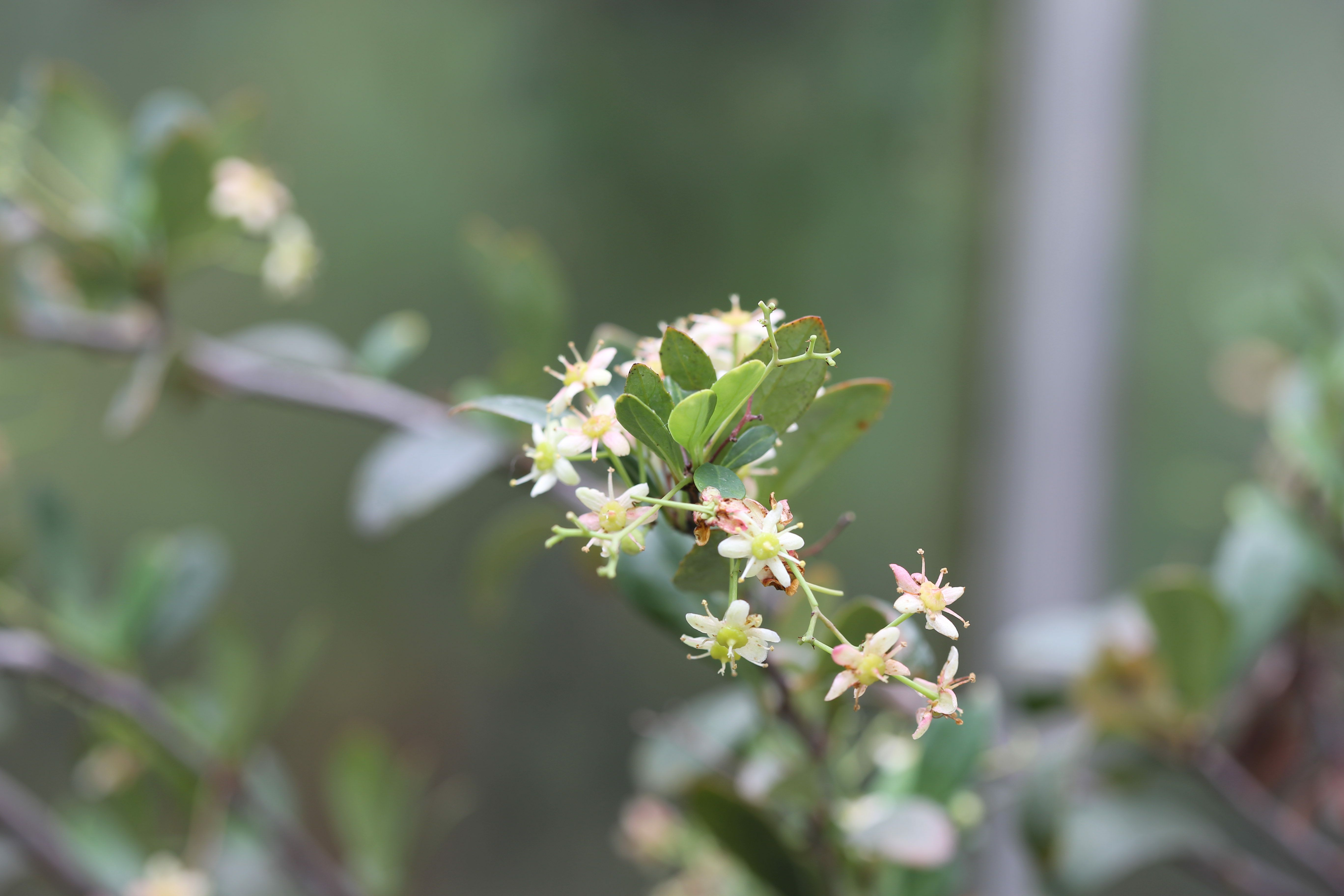
- Putterlickia pyracantha

Scientific classification
- Kingdom: Plantae
- Clade: Tracheophytes
- Clade: Angiosperms
- Clade: Eudicots
- Clade: Rosids
- Order: Celastrales
- Family: Celastraceae
- Tribe: Celastreae
- Genus: Putterlickia; Endl.

Species
- See text

= Putterlickia =

Genus of Celastraceae plants

Putterlickia, variously called spikethorns, false spike thorns, mock spike thorns and bastard spike thorns, are a genus of flowering plants in the staff vine and bittersweet family Celastraceae, native to South Africa, Eswatini and Mozambique. Endophytic bacteria in their roots produce maytansine.

== Species ==
Five species are accepted:

- Putterlickia neglecta Jordaan, R.G.C.Boon & A.E.van Wyk
- Putterlickia pyracantha (L.) Szyszyl.
- Putterlickia retrospinosa A.E.van Wyk & Mostert
- Putterlickia saxatilis (Burch.) Jordaan
- Putterlickia verrucosa (E.Mey. ex Harv. & Sond.) Sim
