= Marijordaania =

Scientific classification
- Kingdom: Plantae
- Clade: Tracheophytes
- Clade: Angiosperms
- Clade: Eudicots
- Clade: Rosids
- Order: Celastrales
- Family: Celastraceae
- Genus: Marijordaania; A.E.van Wyk & R.G.C.Boon
- Species: M. filiformis

Binomial name
- Marijordaania filiformis (Davison) A.E.van Wyk & R.G.C.Boon

Synonyms
- Gymnosporia filiformis Davison “Maytenus sp" “Maytenus sp. A” sensu Van Wyk non Schmidt

Genus of plants

Marijordaania filiformis is a species of shrub or small trees belonging to the family Celastraceae. It is the only species of the genus Marijordaania. The species is said to thrive in the undergrowth of Scarp Forest and is considered relatively rare. It is also confidently known only from KwaZulu-Natal and Eastern Cape Provinces of South Africa. It is proposed as Endangered based on its preliminary conservation assessment. When found in the wild, they're red with white edges and a green center. They're also found with a few flowers and few fruit and not linked to any season, as they're almost always fertile in any time of the year.

== Etymology ==
The genus is named after Dr. Marie Jordaan as recognition of her significant contributions in the taxonomy of South African flora, particularly in the Celastraceae family.

== Vernacular names ==
The species is known as red-flowered false silkybark and red-flowered silkybark in English, while it is known as rooiblomvalssybas and rooiblomsybas in Afrikaans.
