= Wilczekra =

Scientific classification
- Kingdom: Plantae
- Clade: Tracheophytes
- Clade: Angiosperms
- Clade: Eudicots
- Clade: Rosids
- Order: Celastrales
- Family: Celastraceae
- Genus: Wilczekra; M.P.Simmons

Genus of flowering plants

Wilczekra is a genus of flowering plants belonging to the family Celastraceae.

Its native range is Western Central Tropical Africa.

Species:

- Wilczekra congolensis (R.Wilczek) M.P.Simmons
- Wilczekra gabonica Breteler
