= Hexaspora =

Scientific classification
- Kingdom: Plantae
- Clade: Tracheophytes
- Clade: Angiosperms
- Clade: Eudicots
- Clade: Rosids
- Order: Celastrales
- Family: Celastraceae
- Genus: Hexaspora; C.T.White
- Species: H. pubescens

Binomial name
- Hexaspora pubescens C.T.White

Genus of plants

Hexaspora is a monotypic genus of flowering plants belonging to the family Celastraceae. The only species is Hexaspora pubescens.

Its native range is Northeastern Australia.
