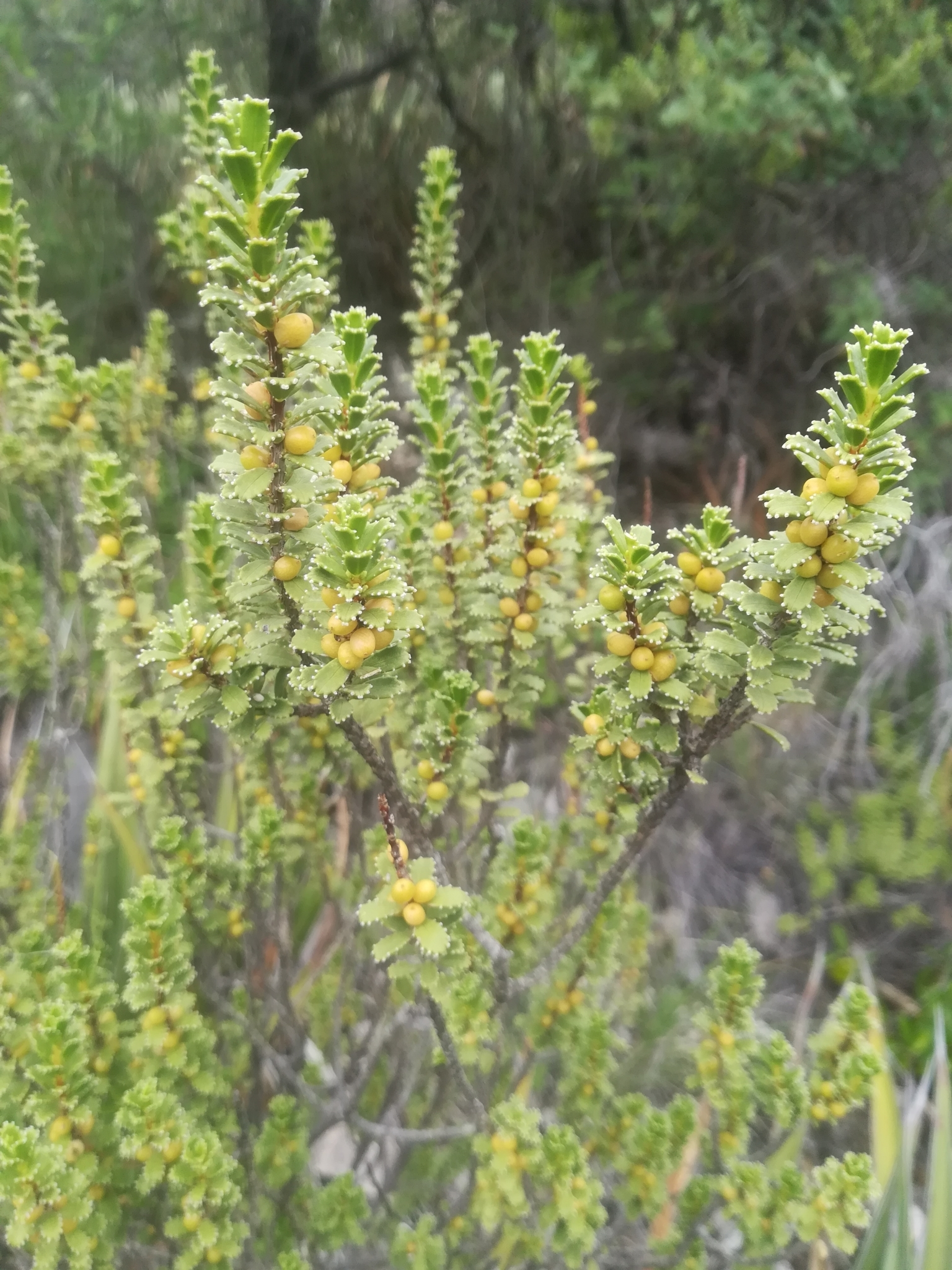
- Orthosphenia mexicana

Scientific classification
- Kingdom: Plantae
- Clade: Tracheophytes
- Clade: Angiosperms
- Clade: Eudicots
- Clade: Rosids
- Order: Celastrales
- Family: Celastraceae
- Genus: Orthosphenia; Standl.
- Species: O. mexicana

Binomial name
- Orthosphenia mexicana Standl.

= Orthosphenia =

Genus of plants

Orthosphenia is a monotypic genus of flowering plants belonging to the family Celastraceae. The only species is Orthosphenia mexicana.

Its native range is Northeastern Mexico.
