= Salacighia =

Scientific classification
- Kingdom: Plantae
- Clade: Tracheophytes
- Clade: Angiosperms
- Clade: Eudicots
- Clade: Rosids
- Order: Celastrales
- Family: Celastraceae
- Genus: Salacighia; Loes.

Genus of plants

Salacighia is a genus of flowering plants belonging to the family Celastraceae. Its native range is Cameroon, the Central African Republic, the Republic of the Congo, the Democratic Republic of the Congo, Equatorial Guinea, Gabon, Guinea, Ivory Coast, Liberia, Nigeria, Sierra Leone, and Uganda.

Species:

- Salacighia letestuana (Pellegr.) Blakelock
- Salacighia linderi (Loes. ex Harms) Blakelock
