= Dinghoua =

Scientific classification
- Kingdom: Plantae
- Clade: Embryophytes
- Clade: Tracheophytes
- Clade: Spermatophytes
- Clade: Angiosperms
- Clade: Eudicots
- Clade: Rosids
- Order: Celastrales
- Family: Celastraceae
- Genus: Dinghoua; R.H.Archer
- Species: D. globularis

Binomial name
- Dinghoua globularis (Ding Hou) R.H.Archer

Synonyms
- Euonymus globularis Ding Hou

Genus of plants

Dinghoua globularis is a species of Australian flowering plant belonging to the family Celastraceae. It is a shrub or tree native to northern Queensland. It is the sole species in genus Dinghoua.
