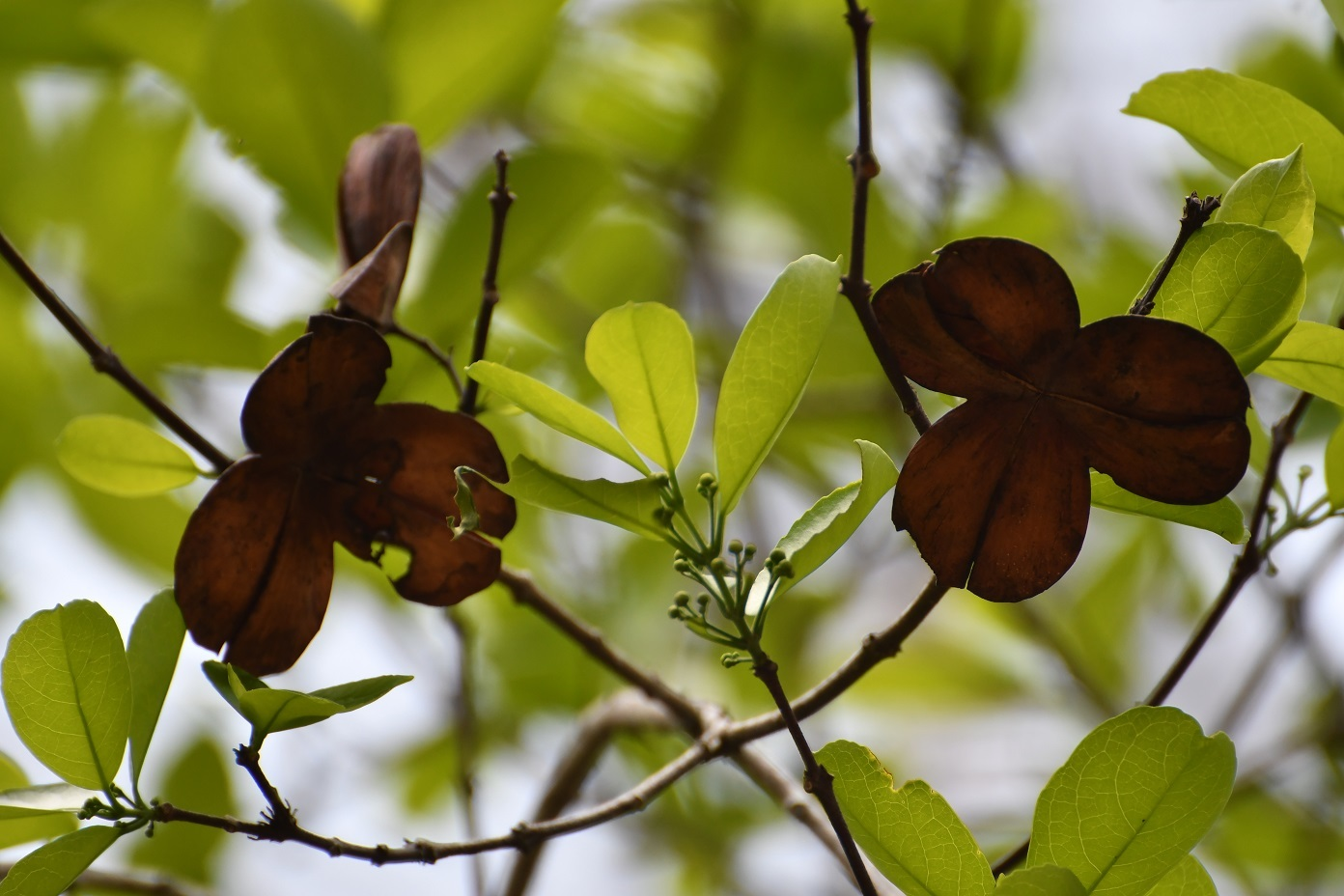
- Semialarium mexicanum

Scientific classification
- Kingdom: Plantae
- Clade: Tracheophytes
- Clade: Angiosperms
- Clade: Eudicots
- Clade: Rosids
- Order: Celastrales
- Family: Celastraceae
- Genus: Semialarium; N.Hallé

Synonyms
- Hemiangium A.C.Sm.

= Semialarium =

Genus of plants

Semialarium is a genus of flowering plants belonging to the family Celastraceae. It includes two species native to Mexico and tropical South America.

Species:

- Semialarium mexicanum (Miers) Mennega – Mexico, Central America, and Venezuela
- Semialarium paniculatum (Mart.) N.Hallé – central, eastern, and southern Brazil, Colombia, and Paraguay
