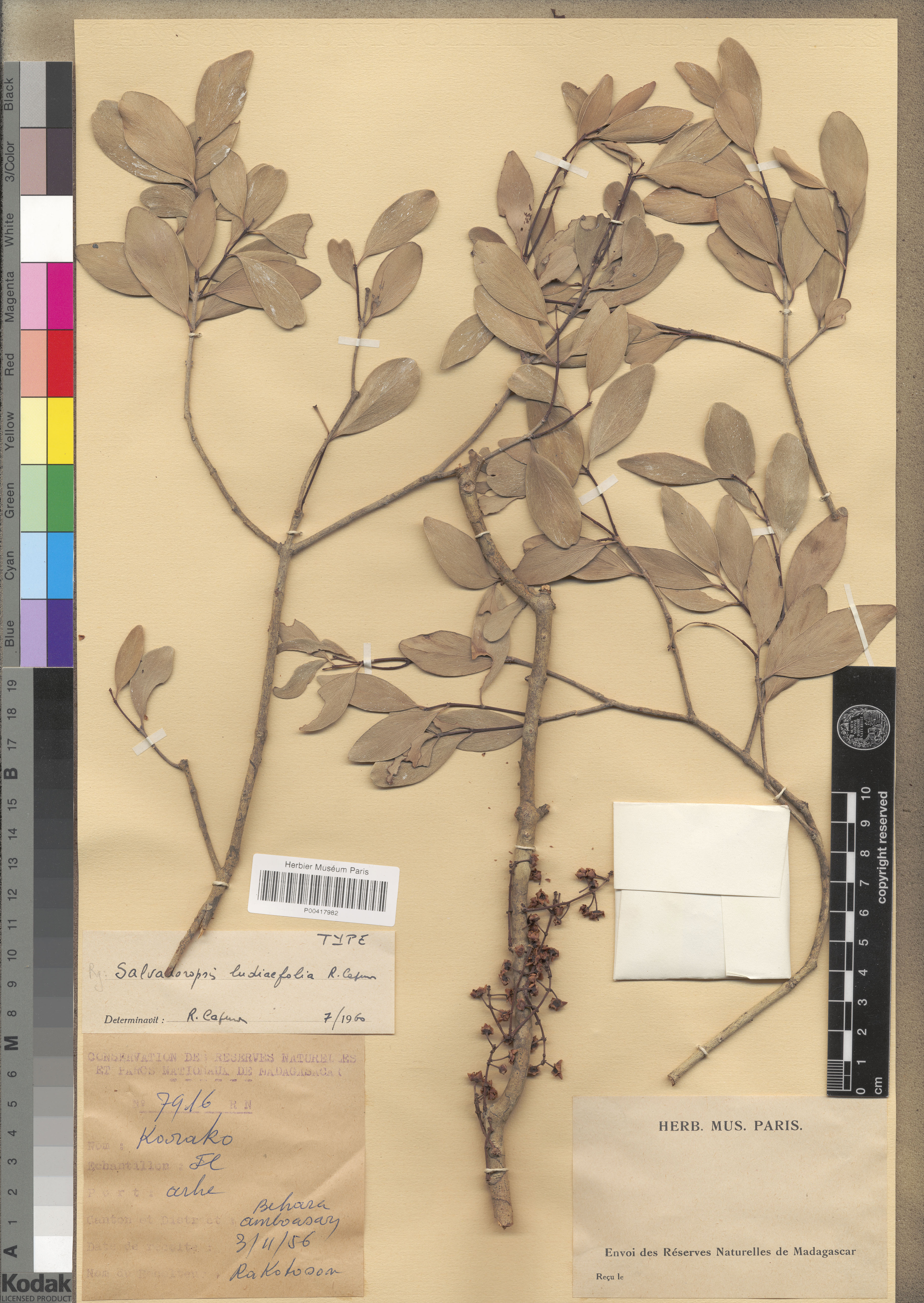

Conservation status
- Endangered (IUCN 3.1)

Scientific classification
- Kingdom: Plantae
- Clade: Tracheophytes
- Clade: Angiosperms
- Clade: Eudicots
- Clade: Rosids
- Order: Celastrales
- Family: Celastraceae
- Genus: Salvadoropsis; H.Perrier
- Species: S. arenicola

Binomial name
- Salvadoropsis arenicola H.Perrier

= Salvadoropsis =

Species of flowering plant

Salvadoropsis is a monotypic genus of flowering plants belonging to the family Celastraceae. It only contains one known species, Salvadoropsis arenicola.

It is native to Madagascar.

== Description ==
Salvadoropsis arenicola is a small tree. It flowers in February.

== Range and habitat ==
Salvadoropsis arenicola is endemic to southwestern Madagascar. It is known only from the coastal area around Tsimanampetsotse. There are three known subpopulations. The species' estimated extent of occurrence (EOO) is 421 km^{2}, and the estimated area of occupancy (AOO) is 16 km^{2}.

It is found in spiny thicket and dry deciduous forest. It grows on sand between 34 and 50 meters elevation.

== Conservation and threats ==
The species is threatened by habitat loss from selective logging, fire, and nomadic grazing. Its conservation status is assessed as endangered.

== Name ==
The genus name of Salvadoropsis is in honour of Jaime Salvador y Pedrol (1649–1740), a Spanish apothecary in Barcelona. He also collected plants in Catalonia. The Latin specific epithet of arenicola means sand-dwelling. Both the genus and the species were first described and published in Bull. Soc. Bot. France Vol.111 on page 96 in 1945.
