= Campylostemon =

Scientific classification
- Kingdom: Plantae
- Clade: Tracheophytes
- Clade: Angiosperms
- Clade: Eudicots
- Clade: Rosids
- Order: Celastrales
- Family: Celastraceae
- Genus: Campylostemon; Welw. ex Benth. & Hook.f.

Genus of flowering plants

Campylostemon is a genus of flowering plants belonging to the family Celastraceae.

Its native range is Western, Eastern and Southern Tropical Africa.

Species:

- Campylostemon angolensis Welw. ex Oliv.
- Campylostemon bequaertii De Wild.
- Campylostemon danckelmannianus Loes.
- Campylostemon laurentii De Wild.
- Campylostemon lindequistianus Loes.
- Campylostemon mitophorus Loes.
- Campylostemon warneckeanus Loes. ex Fritsch
