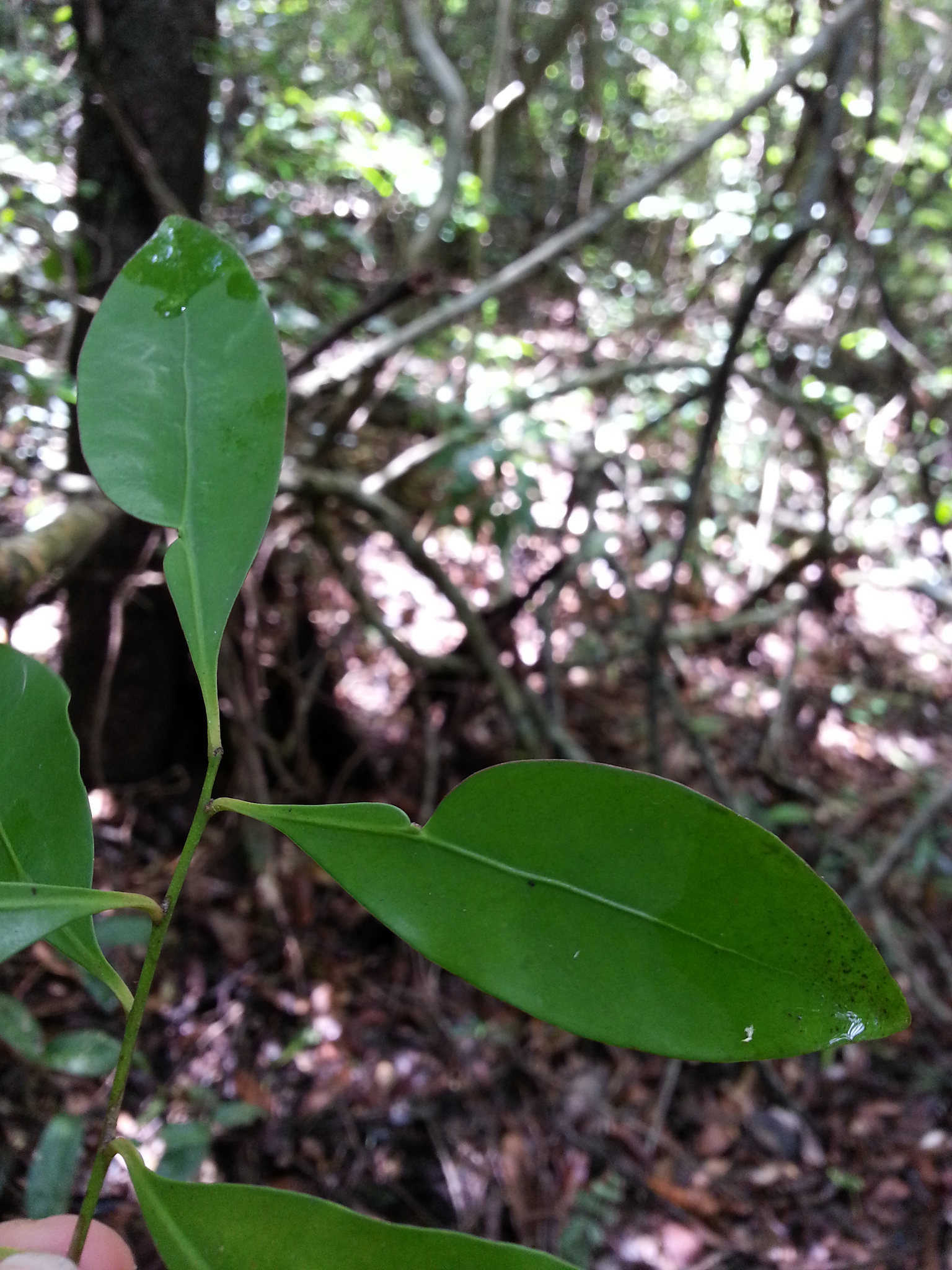
- Polycardia lateralis

Scientific classification
- Kingdom: Plantae
- Clade: Tracheophytes
- Clade: Angiosperms
- Clade: Eudicots
- Clade: Rosids
- Order: Celastrales
- Family: Celastraceae
- Genus: Polycardia; Juss.

Synonyms
- Florinda Noronha ex Endl.

= Polycardia =

Genus of flowering plants

Polycardia is a genus of flowering plants belonging to the family Celastraceae. Its native range is Madagascar.

Species:

- Polycardia aquifolium Tul.
- Polycardia lateralis O.Hoffm.
- Polycardia libera O.Hoffm.
- Polycardia phyllanthoides Lam.
