= Thyrsosalacia =

Scientific classification
- Kingdom: Plantae
- Clade: Tracheophytes
- Clade: Angiosperms
- Clade: Eudicots
- Clade: Rosids
- Order: Celastrales
- Family: Celastraceae
- Genus: Thyrsosalacia; Loes.

Genus of flowering plants

Thyrsosalacia is a genus of flowering plants belonging to the family Celastraceae. Its native range is Cameroon and Gabon.

Species:

- Thyrsosalacia nematobrachion Loes.
- Thyrsosalacia pararacemosa N.Hallé
- Thyrsosalacia racemosa (Loes. ex Harms) N.Hallé
- Thyrsosalacia viciifolia N.Hallé
