= Helictonema =

Scientific classification
- Kingdom: Plantae
- Clade: Tracheophytes
- Clade: Angiosperms
- Clade: Eudicots
- Clade: Rosids
- Order: Celastrales
- Family: Celastraceae
- Genus: Helictonema; Pierre
- Species: H. velutinum

Binomial name
- Helictonema velutinum (Afzel.) R.Wilczek (1960)

Synonyms
- Helictonema klaineanum Pierre (1898); Hippocratea velutina Afzel. (1813); Salacia unguiculata De Wild. & T.Durand (1899)

Genus of plants

Helictonema is a monotypic genus of flowering plants belonging to the family Celastraceae. The only species is Helictonema velutinum, a liana native to tropical Africa, ranging from Guinea through west and west-central Africa to Uganda.
