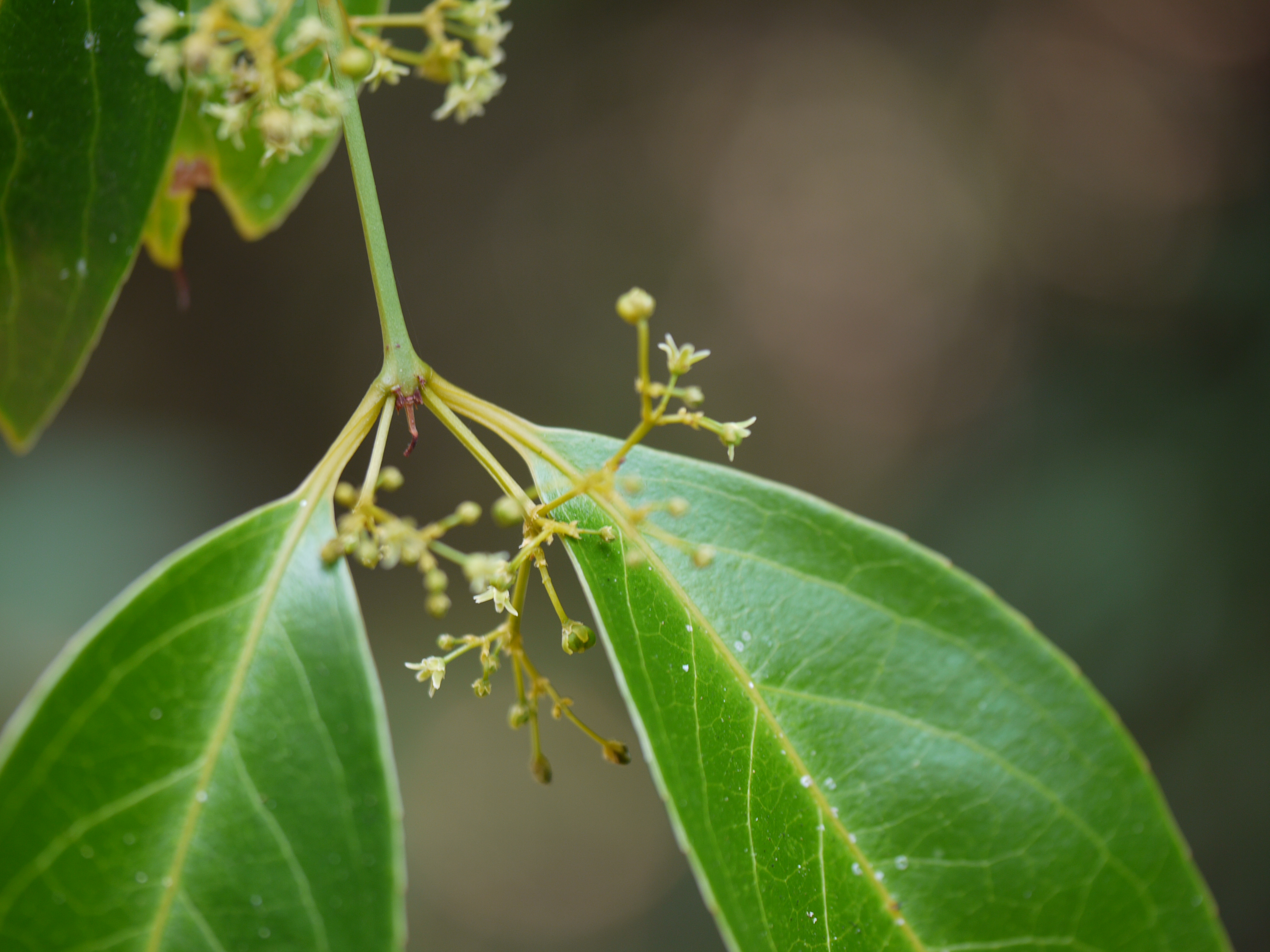
- Reissantia indica

Scientific classification
- Kingdom: Plantae
- Clade: Tracheophytes
- Clade: Angiosperms
- Clade: Eudicots
- Clade: Rosids
- Order: Celastrales
- Family: Celastraceae
- Genus: Reissantia; N.Hallé

= Reissantia =

Genus of flowering plants

Reissantia is a genus of flowering plants belonging to the family Celastraceae.

Its native range is Tropical and Subtropical Old World. This includes parts of Africa (Angola, Benin, Botswana, Cameroon, Caprivi Strip, Central African Republic, Congo, Ethiopia, Gabon, Ghana, Guinea, Guinea-Bissau, Gulf of Guinea Islands, Ivory Coast, Liberia, Madagascar, Malawi, Mali, Mozambique, Namibia, Nigeria, Northern Provinces (in South Africa), Senegal, Sierra Leone, Sudan, Tanzania, Uganda, Zambia, Zaïre and Zimbabwe), and parts of Asia (Andaman Islands, Assam, Bangladesh, Borneo, Cambodia, China (south-central and south-east), East Himalaya, Hainan, India, Java, Laos, Lesser Sunda Islands, Malaya, Maluku, Myanmar, Nepal, New Guinea, Philippines, Sri Lanka, Sulawesi, Sumatera, Thailand and Vietnam).

The genus name of Reissantia is in honour of Charles Tisserant (1886–1962), a French clergyman, botanist and plant collector. It was first described and published in Bull. Mus. Natl. Hist. Nat., séries 2, Vol.39 on page 466 in 1958.

== Known species ==
According to Kew:

- Reissantia angustipetala (H.Perrier) N.Hallé
- Reissantia arborea (Roxb.) H.Hara
- Reissantia buchananii (Loes.) N.Hallé
- Reissantia cassinoides (DC.) Ding Hou
- Reissantia grahamii (Wight) Ding Hou
- Reissantia indica (Willd.) N.Hallé
- Reissantia parviflora (N.E.Br.) N.Hallé
- Reissantia sessiliflora N.V.Page, Srivastav & R.Rao
- Reissantia setulosa (A.C.Sm.) N.Hallé
