= Hylenaea =

Scientific classification
- Kingdom: Plantae
- Clade: Tracheophytes
- Clade: Angiosperms
- Clade: Eudicots
- Clade: Rosids
- Order: Celastrales
- Family: Celastraceae
- Genus: Hylenaea; Miers

Synonyms
- Heterotypic Synonyms: Tyloderma Miers

Genus of plants

Hylenaea is a genus of flowering plants belonging to the family Celastraceae. It is native to Bolivia, Brazil, Colombia, Costa Rica, Ecuador, French Guiana, Guyana, Panama, Peru, Suriname, Trinidad-Tobago, and Venezuela.

== Species ==
Accepted species in the genus indlude:

- Hylenaea comosa (Sw.) Miers
- Hylenaea praecelsa (Miers) A.C.Sm.
- Hylenaea unguiculata Mennega
