= Simicratea =

Scientific classification
- Kingdom: Plantae
- Clade: Tracheophytes
- Clade: Angiosperms
- Clade: Eudicots
- Clade: Rosids
- Order: Celastrales
- Family: Celastraceae
- Genus: Simicratea; N.Hallé
- Species: S. welwitschii

Binomial name
- Simicratea welwitschii (Oliv.) N.Hallé

Synonyms
- Hippocratea welwitschii Oliv.; Simirestis welwitschii (Oliv.) N.Hallé ex R.Wilczek

Monotypic genus of flowering plants

Simicratea is a monotypic genus of flowering plants belonging to the family Celastraceae. The only species is Simicratea welwitschii. It is a liana which ranges from Senegal in west tropical Africa through central tropical Africa to Tanzania and northern Angola.
