= Goniodiscus =

Conservation status
- Near Threatened (IUCN 3.1)

Scientific classification
- Kingdom: Plantae
- Clade: Tracheophytes
- Clade: Angiosperms
- Clade: Eudicots
- Clade: Rosids
- Order: Celastrales
- Family: Celastraceae
- Genus: Goniodiscus; Kuhlm.
- Species: G. elaeospermus

Binomial name
- Goniodiscus elaeospermus Kuhlm.

Genus of flowering plants

Goniodiscus is a genus of flowering plants in the family Celastraceae. It includes a single species, Goniodiscus elaeospermus, a tree endemic to northern Brazil, which can grow up to 20 meters tall. It is known from the municipalities of Borba, Careiro, and Maués in Amazonas state, where it grows in seasonally-inundated Várzea forests.
