= Salaciopsis =

Scientific classification
- Kingdom: Plantae
- Clade: Tracheophytes
- Clade: Angiosperms
- Clade: Eudicots
- Clade: Rosids
- Order: Celastrales
- Family: Celastraceae
- Genus: Salaciopsis; Baker f.

Synonyms
- Lecardia Poiss. ex Guillaumin

Family of shrubs and trees

Salaciopsis is a genus of shrubs and small trees in the family Celastraceae. The genus is endemic to New Caledonia in the Pacific and contains six species.

== Species ==
Six species are accepted.

- Salaciopsis glomerata Hürl.
- Salaciopsis longistyla I.H. Müller
- Salaciopsis megaphylla (J.Poiss. ex Guillaumin) Loes.
- Salaciopsis neocaledonica Baker f.
- Salaciopsis sparsifolia Hürl.
- Salaciopsis tiwakae I.H.Müller
