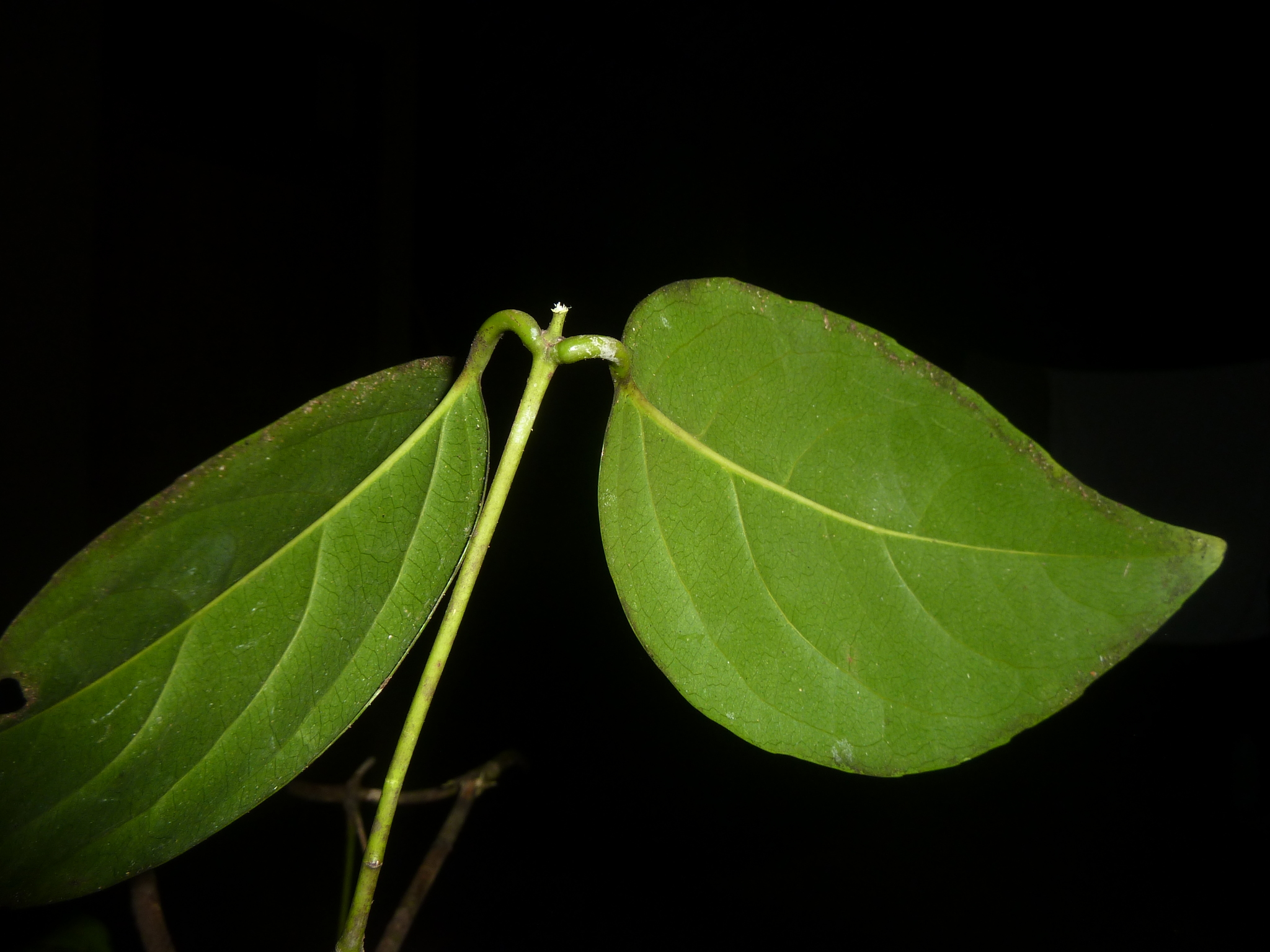
- Cuervea kappleriana in Provincia de Puntarenas, Costa Rica

Scientific classification
- Kingdom: Plantae
- Clade: Tracheophytes
- Clade: Angiosperms
- Clade: Eudicots
- Clade: Rosids
- Order: Celastrales
- Family: Celastraceae
- Genus: Cuervea; Triana ex Miers

Synonyms
- Romualdea Triana & Planch.

= Cuervea =

Genus of flowering plants

Cuervea is a genus of flowering plants belonging to the family Celastraceae. Its native range is tropical America and Western Tropical Africa to Angola.

== Species ==
Seven species are accepted.

- Cuervea crenulata Mennega
- Cuervea hawkesii Proctor
- Cuervea integrifolia (A.Rich.) A.C.Sm.
- Cuervea isangiensis (De Wild.) N.Hallé
- Cuervea jamaicensis Proctor
- Cuervea kappleriana (Miq.) A.C.Sm.
- Cuervea macrophylla (Vahl) R.Wilczek
