= Haydenoxylon =

Scientific classification
- Kingdom: Plantae
- Clade: Tracheophytes
- Clade: Angiosperms
- Clade: Eudicots
- Clade: Rosids
- Order: Celastrales
- Family: Celastraceae
- Genus: Haydenoxylon; M.P.Simmons (2014)

Species
- Haydenoxylon calzadae (Lundell) Biral; Haydenoxylon gentryi (Lundell) M.P.Simmons; Haydenoxylon urbanianum (Loes.) M.P.Simmons

Synonyms
- Haydenia M.P.Simmons (2011), nom. illeg.

Genus of flowering plants

Haydenoxylon is a genus of flowering plants in family Celastraceae. It includes three species of trees native to the tropical Americas, with one (H. calzadae) native to Veracruz and Costa Rica, and the others (H. gentryi and H. urbanianum) to northwestern South America from Colombia to Bolivia.

- Haydenoxylon calzadae (Lundell) Biral – Mexico (Veracruz) and Costa Rica
- Haydenoxylon gentryi (Lundell) M.P.Simmons – Andes of Colombia, Ecuador, and Peru
- Haydenoxylon urbanianum (Loes.) M.P.Simmons – Colombia, Peru, and Bolivia
