= Tristemonanthus =

Scientific classification
- Kingdom: Plantae
- Clade: Tracheophytes
- Clade: Angiosperms
- Clade: Eudicots
- Clade: Rosids
- Order: Celastrales
- Family: Celastraceae
- Genus: Tristemonanthus; Loes.

Genus of flowering plants

Tristemonanthus is a genus of flowering plants belonging to the family Celastraceae. Its native range is Cameroon, the Republic of the Congo, the Democratic Republic of the Congo, Gabon, Guinea, Ivory Coast, Liberia.

Species:

- Tristemonanthus mildbraedianus Loes.
- Tristemonanthus nigrisilvae (N.Hallé) N.Hallé
