= Evonymopsis =

Scientific classification
- Kingdom: Plantae
- Clade: Tracheophytes
- Clade: Angiosperms
- Clade: Eudicots
- Clade: Rosids
- Order: Celastrales
- Family: Celastraceae
- Genus: Evonymopsis; H.Perrier

Genus of plants

Evonymopsis is a genus of flowering plants belonging to the family Celastraceae.

Its native range is Madagascar.

== Species ==
Species:

- Evonymopsis acutifolia (H.Perrier) H.Perrier
- Evonymopsis humbertii H.Perrier
- Evonymopsis longipes (H.Perrier) H.Perrier
- Evonymopsis obcuneata (H.Perrier) H.Perrier
