= Brexiella =

Scientific classification
- Kingdom: Plantae
- Clade: Tracheophytes
- Clade: Angiosperms
- Clade: Eudicots
- Clade: Rosids
- Order: Celastrales
- Family: Celastraceae
- Genus: Brexiella; H.Perrier

Genus of flowering plants

Brexiella is a genus of flowering plants belonging to the family Celastraceae.

Its native range is Madagascar.

Species:

- Brexiella cymosa H.Perrier
- Brexiella ilicifolia H.Perrier
