= Bequaertia =

Scientific classification
- Kingdom: Plantae
- Clade: Tracheophytes
- Clade: Angiosperms
- Clade: Eudicots
- Clade: Rosids
- Order: Celastrales
- Family: Celastraceae
- Genus: Bequaertia; R.Wilczek (1956)
- Species: B. mucronata

Binomial name
- Bequaertia mucronata (Exell) R.Wilczek (1956)

Synonyms
- Campylostemon mucronatus (Exell) J.B.Hall (1981); Hippocratea kaimlecta Loes. ex Harms (1942); Hippocratea mucronata Exell (1927); Hippocratea semlikiensis Robyns & Tournay (1948)

Genus of flowering plants

Bequaertia mucronata is a species of flowering plant belonging to the family Celastraceae. It is a climbing shrub or liana native to western and central tropical Africa, ranging from Guinea to southwestern Uganda. It grows in damp forests and on river banks. It is the sole species in genus Bequaertia.

Plants can grow 15 to 25 meters tall. The main stem can exceed 10 cm in diameter, and branches are covered in a brownish-red bark which becomes pale and flaky with age. Leaves are elliptic in shape, (5–)9–14 cm long and 3–5 cm wide, with a papery texture. Flowers are 4–5 mm in diameter with fleshy incurved petals, which are white at first and change to orange, rose-salmon and finally brownish-red.
