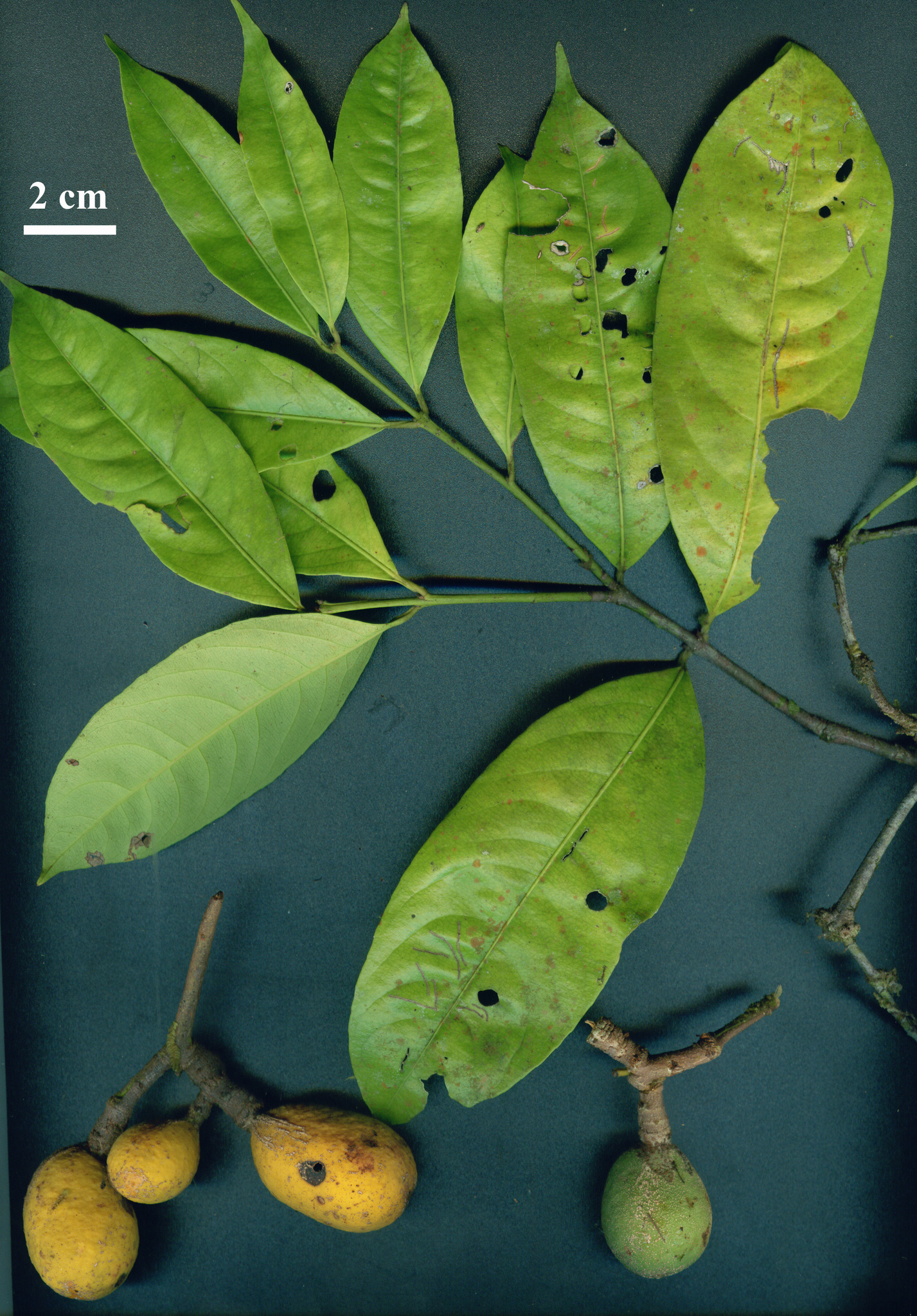
- Cheiloclinium cognatum

Scientific classification
- Kingdom: Plantae
- Clade: Tracheophytes
- Clade: Angiosperms
- Clade: Eudicots
- Clade: Rosids
- Order: Celastrales
- Family: Celastraceae
- Genus: Cheiloclinium; Miers

Synonyms
- Kippistia Miers

= Cheiloclinium =

Genus of flowering plants

Cheiloclinium is a genus of flowering plants belonging to the family Celastraceae. It includes 13 species native to the tropical Americas, ranging from central Mexico to Bolivia and southern Brazil.

== Species ==
13 species are accepted.

- Cheiloclinium anomalum Miers
- Cheiloclinium articulatum (A.C.Sm.) A.C.Sm.
- Cheiloclinium belizense (Standl.) A.C.Sm.
- Cheiloclinium cognatum (Miers) A.C.Sm.
- Cheiloclinium diffusiflorum (Miers) A.C.Sm.
- Cheiloclinium habropodum A.C.Sm.
- Cheiloclinium hippocrateoides (Peyr.) A.C.Sm.
- Cheiloclinium klugii A.C.Sm.
- Cheiloclinium obtusum A.C.Sm.
- Cheiloclinium pedunculatum (A.C.Sm.) A.C.Sm.
- Cheiloclinium puberulum Lombardi
- Cheiloclinium schwackeanum Loes.
- Cheiloclinium serratum (Cambess.) A.C.Sm.
