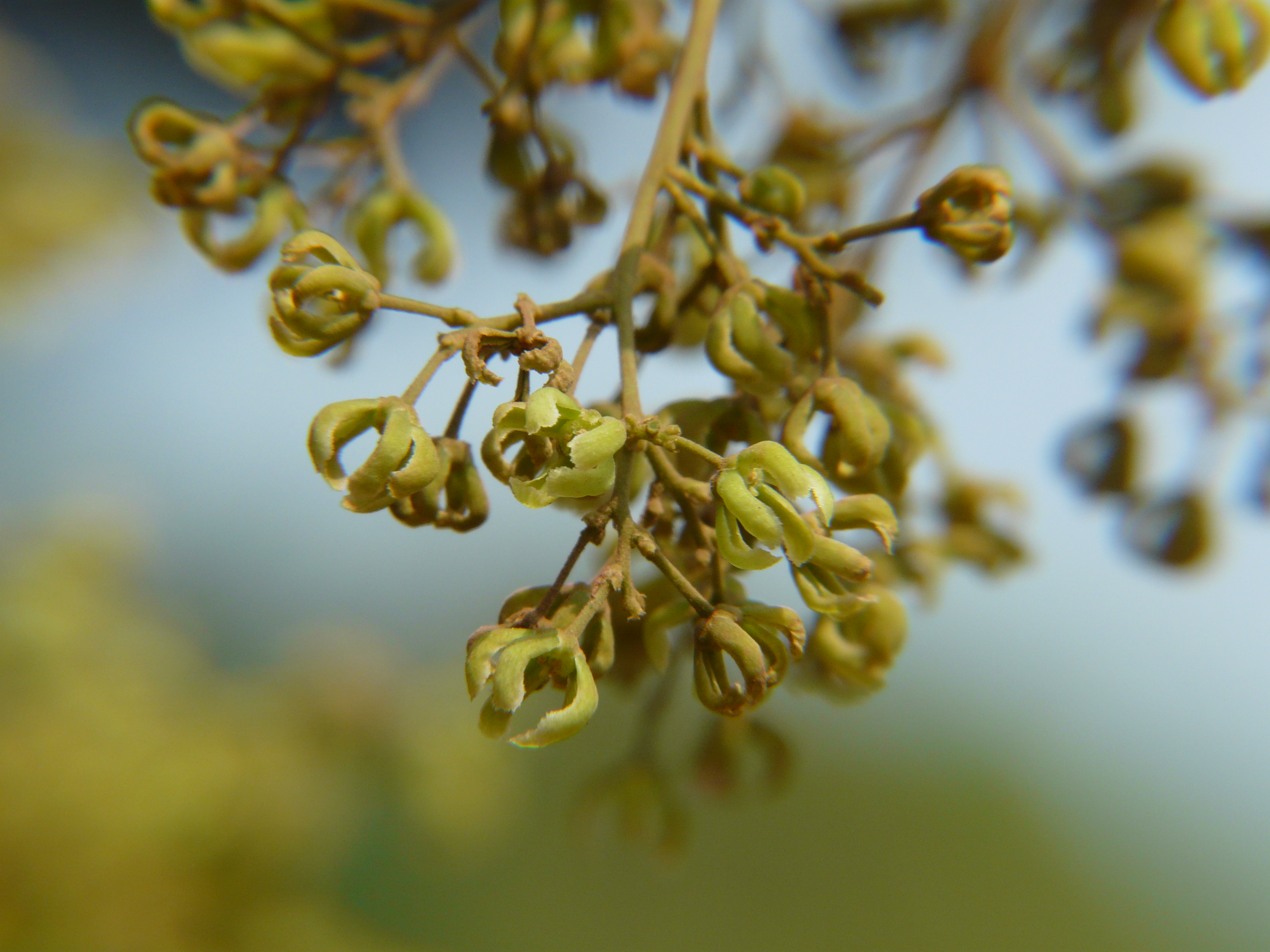
- Arnicratea grahamii plant

Scientific classification
- Kingdom: Plantae
- Clade: Tracheophytes
- Clade: Angiosperms
- Clade: Eudicots
- Clade: Rosids
- Order: Celastrales
- Family: Celastraceae
- Genus: Arnicratea; N.Hallé

= Arnicratea =

Genus of flowering plants

Arnicratea is a genus of flowering plants belonging to the family Celastraceae.

Its native range is Tropical Asia.

Species:

- Arnicratea cambodiana (Pierre) N.Hallé
- Arnicratea ferruginea (King) N.Hallé
