= Hartogiopsis =

Conservation status
- Least Concern (IUCN 3.1)

Scientific classification
- Kingdom: Plantae
- Clade: Tracheophytes
- Clade: Angiosperms
- Clade: Eudicots
- Clade: Rosids
- Order: Celastrales
- Family: Celastraceae
- Genus: Hartogiopsis; H.Perrier
- Species: H. trilobocarpa

Binomial name
- Hartogiopsis trilobocarpa (Baker) H.Perrier

Synonyms
- Hartogia trilobocarpa Baker

Genus of flowering plants

Hartogiopsis is a monotypic genus of flowering plants belonging to the family Celastraceae. It contains only one species, Hartogiopsis trilobocarpa.

It is native to Madagascar.

== Description ==
Hartogiopsis trilobocarpa is a large shrub or small tree that grows up to 12 meters tall.

== Range and habitat ==
Hartogiopsis trilobocarpa is native to eastern and central Madagascar. There are ten known subpopulations of the species. It is found in the regions of Analamanga, Vakinankaratra, Sava, Betsiboka, Alaotra-Mangoro, and Anosy.

It inhabits Madagascar's humid lowland forests and montane humid and subhumid forests, between 100 and 2,130 meters elevation.

== Conservation and threats ==
The species' population is declining from habitat loss caused by deforestation for agriculture and shifting cultivation, logging, and mining. Its population size is not well known. Its conservation status is assessed as least concern.

== Name ==
The genus name of Hartogiopsis is in honour of Johannes Hartog (c. 1663 – 1722), a German gardener and plant collector in Dutch service in present-day Sri Lanka and South Africa. The Latin specific epithet of trilobocarpa means three-lobed. Hartogiopsis trilobocarpa was first described and published by John Gilbert Baker in Notul. Syst. (Paris) Vol.10 on page 195 in 1942.
