= Elachyptera =

Scientific classification
- Kingdom: Plantae
- Clade: Tracheophytes
- Clade: Angiosperms
- Clade: Eudicots
- Clade: Rosids
- Order: Celastrales
- Family: Celastraceae
- Genus: Elachyptera; A.C.Sm.

Genus of plants

Elachyptera is a genus of flowering plants belonging to the family Celastraceae.

Its native range is Tropical and Southern Africa, Madagascar, Central and Southern Tropical America.

Species:

- Elachyptera bipindensis (Loes.) R.Wilczek
- Elachyptera coriacea Lombardi
- Elachyptera festiva (Miers) A.C.Sm.
- Elachyptera floribunda (Benth.) A.C.Sm.
- Elachyptera holtzii (Loes. ex Harms) R.Wilczek
- Elachyptera micrantha (Cambess.) A.C.Sm.
- Elachyptera minimiflora (H.Perrier) N.Hallé
- Elachyptera parvifolia (Oliv.) N.Hallé
