= Apodostigma =

Scientific classification
- Kingdom: Plantae
- Clade: Tracheophytes
- Clade: Angiosperms
- Clade: Eudicots
- Clade: Rosids
- Order: Celastrales
- Family: Celastraceae
- Genus: Apodostigma; R.Wilczek (1956)
- Species: A. pallens

Binomial name
- Apodostigma pallens (Planch. ex Oliv.) R.Wilczek (1956)

Varieties
- Apodostigma pallens var. buchholzii (Loes.) N.Hallé; Apodostigma pallens var. dummeri N.Hallé; Apodostigma pallens var. pallens

Synonyms
- Hippocratea pallens Planch. ex Oliv. (1868)

Genus of flowering plants

Apodostigma pallens is a species of flowering plant belonging to the family Celastraceae. It is a liana native to tropical Africa and Madagascar. It grows from 5 to 15 meters tall, with green to yellow-cream flowers. It is the sole species in genus Apodostigma.

Three varieties are recognized:

- Apodostigma pallens var. buchholzii (Loes.) N.Hallé – western and west-central tropical Africa, from Côte d'Ivoire to Angola
- Apodostigma pallens var. dummeri N.Hallé – central Africa, from Cameroon and Gabon to Uganda
- Apodostigma pallens var. pallens – tropical Africa, from Senegal to Ethiopia, Angola, Mozambique, and Madagascar
