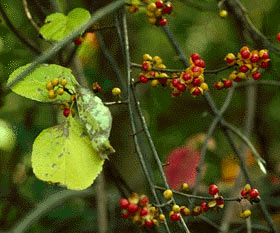
- Oriental staff vine (Celastrus orbiculatus)

Scientific classification
- Kingdom: Plantae
- Clade: Embryophytes
- Clade: Tracheophytes
- Clade: Angiosperms
- Clade: Eudicots
- Clade: Rosids
- Order: Celastrales
- Family: Celastraceae; R.Br.

Subfamilies
- Celastroideae; Hippocrateoideae; Parnassioideae; Salacioideae; Stackhousioideae

Synonyms
- Brexiaceae Loudon (1830); Hippocrateaceae; Malesherbiaceae; Parnassiaceae Martinov, as 'Parnassiae' (1820)

= Celastraceae =

Family of flowering plants

The Celastraceae, also known as the staff-vine or bittersweet family, are a family of 99 genera and 1,350 species of herbs, vines, shrubs and small trees, belonging to the order Celastrales. The great majority of the genera are tropical, with only Celastrus (the staff vines), Euonymus (the spindles), Maytenus and Stackhousia widespread in temperate climates, and Parnassia (bog-stars) found in alpine and arctic climates.

Of the 99 currently recognized genera of the family Celastraceae, 19 are native to Madagascar and these include at least 57 currently recognized species. Six of these 19 genera (Brexiella, Evonymopsis, Hartogiopsis, Polycardia, Ptelidium, and Salvadoropsis) are endemic to Madagascar.

== Genera ==
99 genera are accepted by Plants of the World Online as of March 2026:

- Acanthothamnus Brandegee
- Allocassine N.Robson
- Anthodon Ruiz & Pav.
- Apatophyllum McGill.
- Apodostigma R.Wilczek
- Arnicratea N.Hallé
- Bequaertia R.Wilczek
- Brassiantha A.C.Sm.
- Brexia Norhonha ex Thouars
- Brexiella H.Perrier
- Campylostemon Welw. ex Benth. & Hook.f.
- Canotia Torr. – crucifixion thorn
- Cassine L.
- Catha Forssk. ex Scop. – khat
- Celastrus L. – staff vine or staff tree
- Cheiloclinium Miers
- Crossopetalum P.Browne
- Cuervea Triana ex Miers
- Denhamia Meisn.
- Dicarpellum (Loes.) A.C.Sm.
- Dinghoua R.H.Archer
- Elachyptera A.C.Sm.
- Elaeodendron Jacq.
- Empleuridium Sond. & Harv.
- Euonymus L. – spindle
- Evonymopsis H.Perrier
- Fraunhofera Mart.
- Glyptopetalum Thwaites
- Goniodiscus Kuhlm.
- Gyminda (Griseb.) Sarg.
- Gymnosporia (Wight & Arn.) Hook.f.
- Hartogiopsis H.Perrier
- Haydenoxylon M.P.Simmons
- Hedraianthera F.Muell.
- Helictonema Pierre
- Hexaspora C.T.White
- Hippocratea L.
- Hylenaea Miers
- Hypsophila F.Muell.
- Kokoona Thwaites
- Lauridia Eckl. & Zeyh.
- Lepuropetalon Elliott
- Loeseneriella A.C.Sm.
- Lophopetalum Wight ex Arn.
- Lydenburgia N.Robson
- Macgregoria F.Muell.
- Marijordaania A.E.van Wyk & R.G.C.Boon
- Maurocenia Mill.
- Maytenus Molina – mayten
- Menepetalum Loes.
- Microtropis Wall. ex Meisn.
- Monimopetalum Rehder
- Mortonia A.Gray
- Mystroxylon Eckl. & Zeyh.
- Nicobariodendron Vasudeva Rao & Chakrab.
- Orthosphenia Standl.
- Parnassia L.
- Paxistima Raf.
- Peripterygia Loes.
- Peritassa Miers
- Plagiopteron Griff.
- Platypterocarpus Dunkley & Brenan
- Plenckia Reissek
- Pleurostylia Wight & Arn.
- Polycardia Juss.
- Pottingeria Prain
- Prionostemma Miers
- Pristimera Miers
- Psammomoya Diels & Loes.
- Pseudosalacia Codd
- Ptelidium Thouars
- Pterocelastrus Meisn.
- Putterlickia Endl.
- Quetzalia Lundell
- Reissantia N.Hallé
- Robsonodendron R.H.Archer
- Rzedowskia Medrano
- Salacia L.
- Salacighia Loes.
- Salaciopsis Baker f.
- Salvadoropsis H.Perrier
- Sarawakodendron Ding Hou
- Schaefferia Jacq.
- Semialarium N.Hallé
- Simicratea N.Hallé
- Siphonodon Griff.
- Stackhousia Sm.
- Tetrasiphon Urb.
- Thyrsosalacia Loes.
- Tontelea Miers
- Torralbasia Krug & Urb.
- Tripterococcus Endl.
- Tripterygium Hook.f.
- Tristemonanthus Loes.
- Trochantha (N.Hallé) R.H.Archer
- Wilczekra M.P.Simmons
- Wimmeria Schltdl. & Cham.
- Xylonymus Kalkman ex Ding Hou
- Zinowiewia Turcz.

Fossil genera

- †Celastrinites
