= Pottingeria =

Scientific classification
- Kingdom: Plantae
- Clade: Tracheophytes
- Clade: Angiosperms
- Clade: Eudicots
- Clade: Rosids
- Order: Celastrales
- Family: Celastraceae
- Genus: Pottingeria; Prain
- Species: P. acuminata

Binomial name
- Pottingeria acuminata Prain

Varieties
- Pottingeria acuminata var. acuminata; Pottingeria acuminata var. latifolia Airy Shaw

Genus of plants

Pottingeria is a genus consisting of a single species, Pottingeria acuminata, a small tree or large shrub native to mountainous areas of southeast Asia (Assam, Myanmar, Thailand, and northern Vietnam).

It had long been thought, at least by some, to belong in the order Celastrales. In a phylogenetic study of that order in 2006, Pottingeria was found to be a member of the order, but not of any of its families. It was in an unresolved pentatomy consisting of Parnassiaceae, Pottingeria, Mortonia, the pair (Quetzalia + Zinowiewia), and the other genera of Celastraceae. When the APG III system was published in October 2009, the Angiosperm Phylogeny Group expanded Celastraceae to include all members of the pentatomy mentioned above. Armen Takhtajan had placed Pottingeria in a monotypic family in 1987, but he later treated it as a subfamily of Celastraceae.
