= Stackhousiaceae =

Stackhousiaceae R.Br. is an obsolete family of plants, now merged into the family Celastraceae. When accepted, it comprised the following genera:

- Macgregoria
- Stackhousia
- Tripterococcus
