= Zinowiewia micrantha =

Conservation status
- Data Deficient (IUCN 2.3)

Scientific classification
- Kingdom: Plantae
- Clade: Tracheophytes
- Clade: Angiosperms
- Clade: Eudicots
- Clade: Rosids
- Order: Celastrales
- Family: Celastraceae
- Genus: Zinowiewia
- Species: Z. micrantha

Binomial name
- Zinowiewia micrantha Lundell

Species of flowering plant

Zinowiewia micrantha is a species of flowering plant in the family Celastraceae. It is endemic to Panama.
