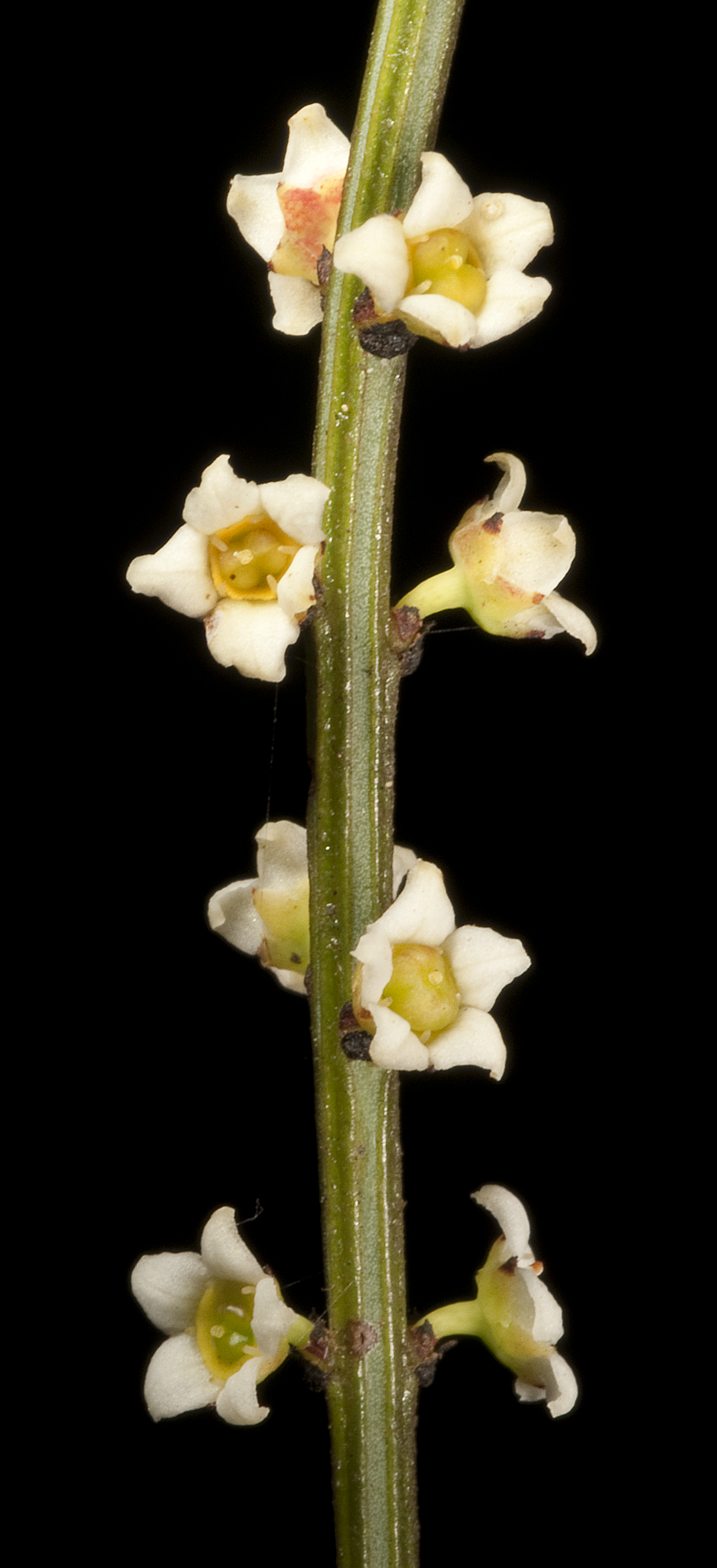

Scientific classification
- Kingdom: Plantae
- Clade: Tracheophytes
- Clade: Angiosperms
- Clade: Eudicots
- Clade: Rosids
- Order: Celastrales
- Family: Celastraceae
- Genus: Psammomoya
- Species: P. choretroides

Binomial name
- Psammomoya choretroides (F.Muell.) Diels & Loes.

Synonyms
- Logania choretroides F.Muell.

= Psammomoya choretroides =

Species of shrub

Psammomoya choretroides is a small shrub in the Celastraceae family, endemic to the south west of Western Australia. It was first described by Ferdinand von Mueller in 1889 as Logania choretroides, but was transferred to the genus, Psammomoya, in 1904 by Ludwig Diels and Ludwig Eduard Theodor Loesener.

== Description ==
Mueller described it as follows:

Comparatively dwarf glabrous \ stems and branches quadrangular, their angles prominent, their sides impressed and greyish; leaves reduced to minute deltoid or orbicular dark scalelets; flowers singly axillar, extremely small, imperfectly bisexual; pedicles very short, minutely bracteolate at the base; lobes of the calyx deltoid-semiovate ; corolla whitish, cleft to the base, hardly twice as long as the calyx, quite glabrous, its segments orbicular-deltoid, much reflexed, with broad base sessile; stamens of the fruit-ripening flowers rudimentary \ disk conspicuous, lobeIcss; stigma roundish, nearly sessile, slightly bilobed; ovulary somewhat depressed; placentaries almost basal, each bearing two or three ovules.

== Etymology ==
Mueller considered the plant to be like a Choretrum, and hence described it using the species epithet, choretroides ("Choretrum-like").
