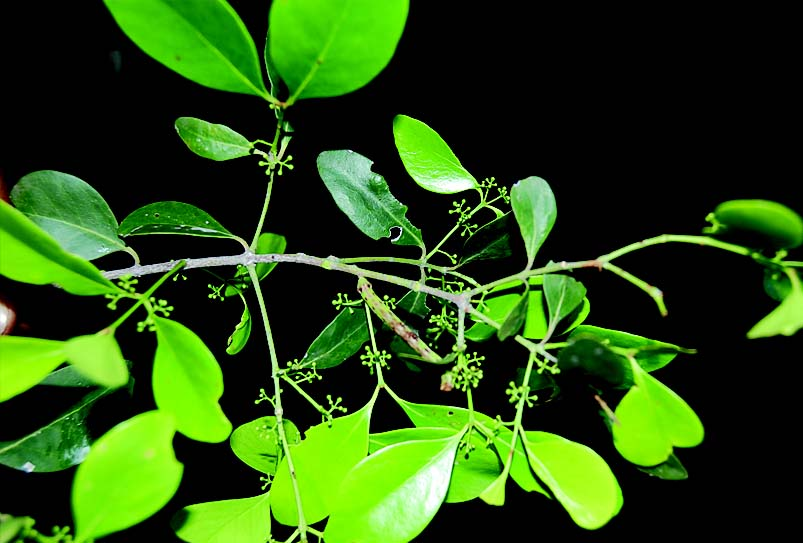

Scientific classification
- Kingdom: Plantae
- Clade: Tracheophytes
- Clade: Angiosperms
- Clade: Eudicots
- Clade: Rosids
- Order: Celastrales
- Family: Celastraceae
- Genus: Pleurostylia
- Species: P. opposita

Binomial name
- Pleurostylia opposita (Wall.) Alston

Synonyms
- Celastrus opposita Wall.; Pleurostylia wightii Wt. & Arn.; Elaeodendron microcarpum C.T.White & W.D.Francis

= Pleurostylia opposita =

Species of shrub

Pleurostylia opposita is a species of shrub in the family Celastraceae. It is distributed throughout India, Indonesia, Malaysia, New Guinea, Philippines, Sri Lanka, Thailand, Vietnam, Australia and China.
