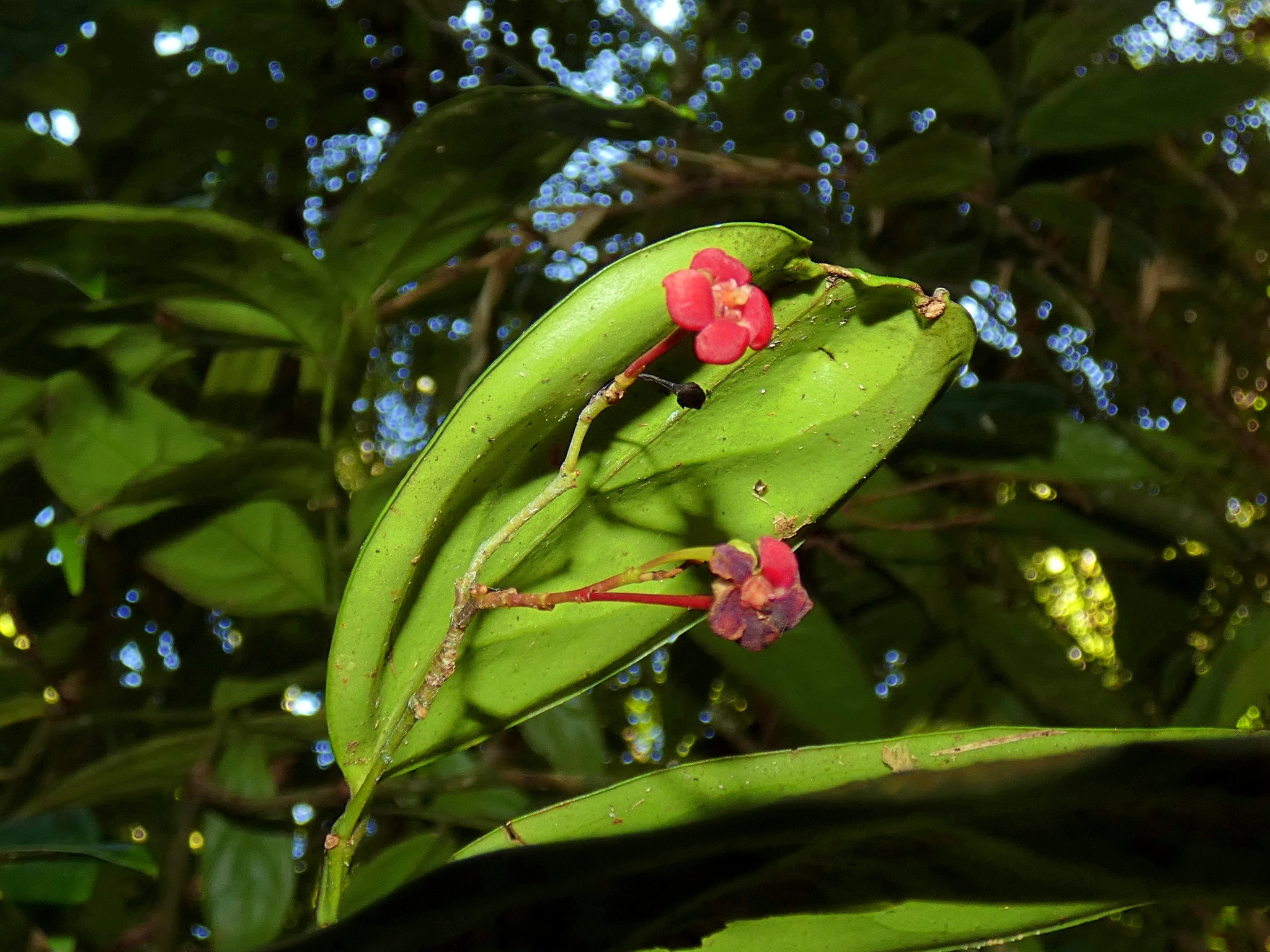
- At Cape Tribulation

Conservation status
- Least Concern (NCA)

Scientific classification
- Kingdom: Plantae
- Clade: Embryophytes
- Clade: Tracheophytes
- Clade: Spermatophytes
- Clade: Angiosperms
- Clade: Eudicots
- Clade: Rosids
- Order: Celastrales
- Family: Celastraceae
- Genus: Hypsophila
- Species: H. dielsiana

Binomial name
- Hypsophila dielsiana Loes.

= Hypsophila dielsiana =

Species of flowering plant

Hypsophila dielsiana is a small tree to 10 m (33 ft) in the family Celastraceae, found only in the Wet Tropics bioregion of Queensland, Australia. It was first described by the German botanist Ludwig Eduard Theodor Loesener in 1903.

== Conservation ==
This species is listed as least concern under the Queensland Government's Nature Conservation Act. As of 6 May 2024, it has not been assessed by the International Union for Conservation of Nature (IUCN).

== Gallery ==
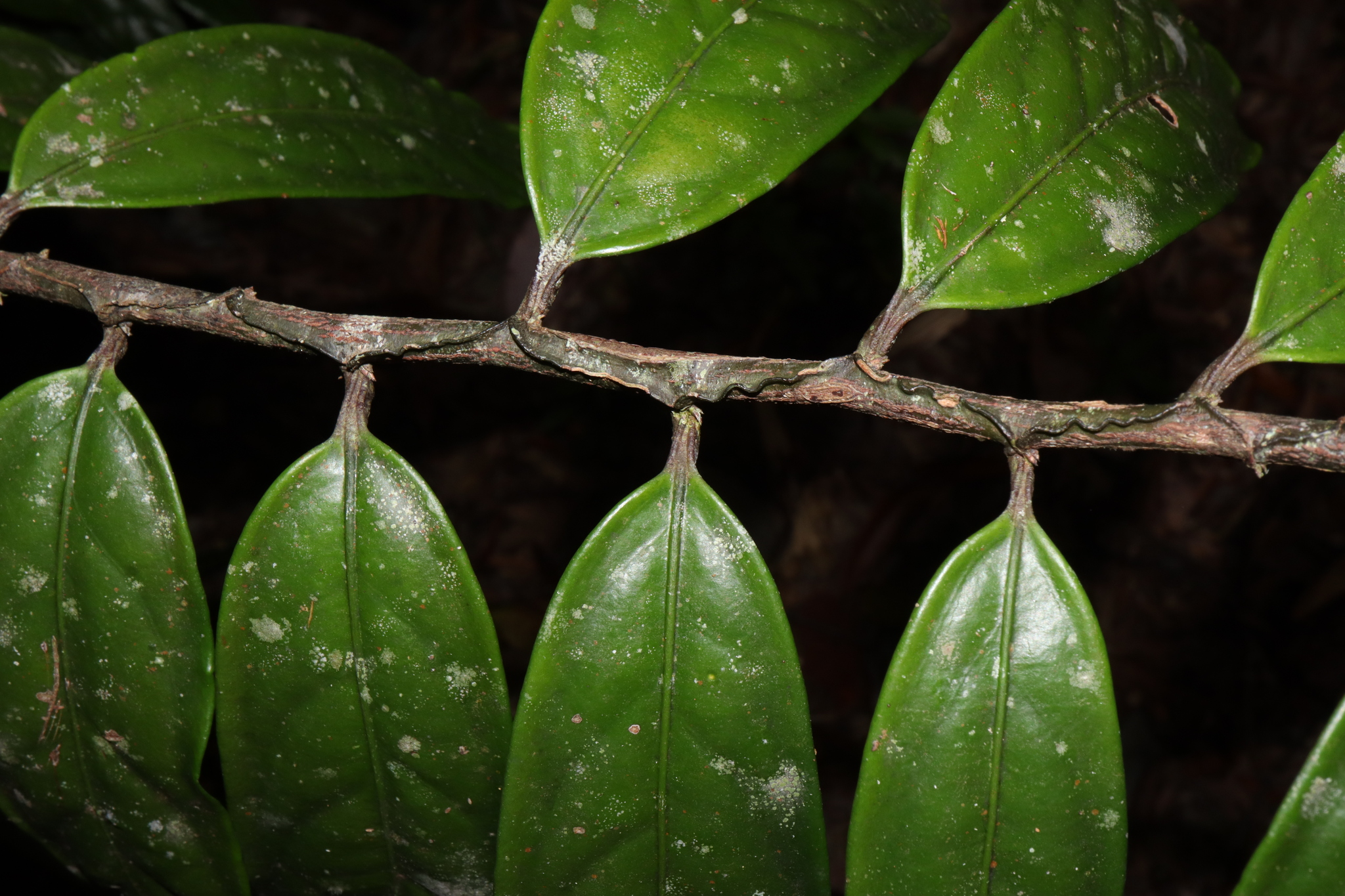
Foliage

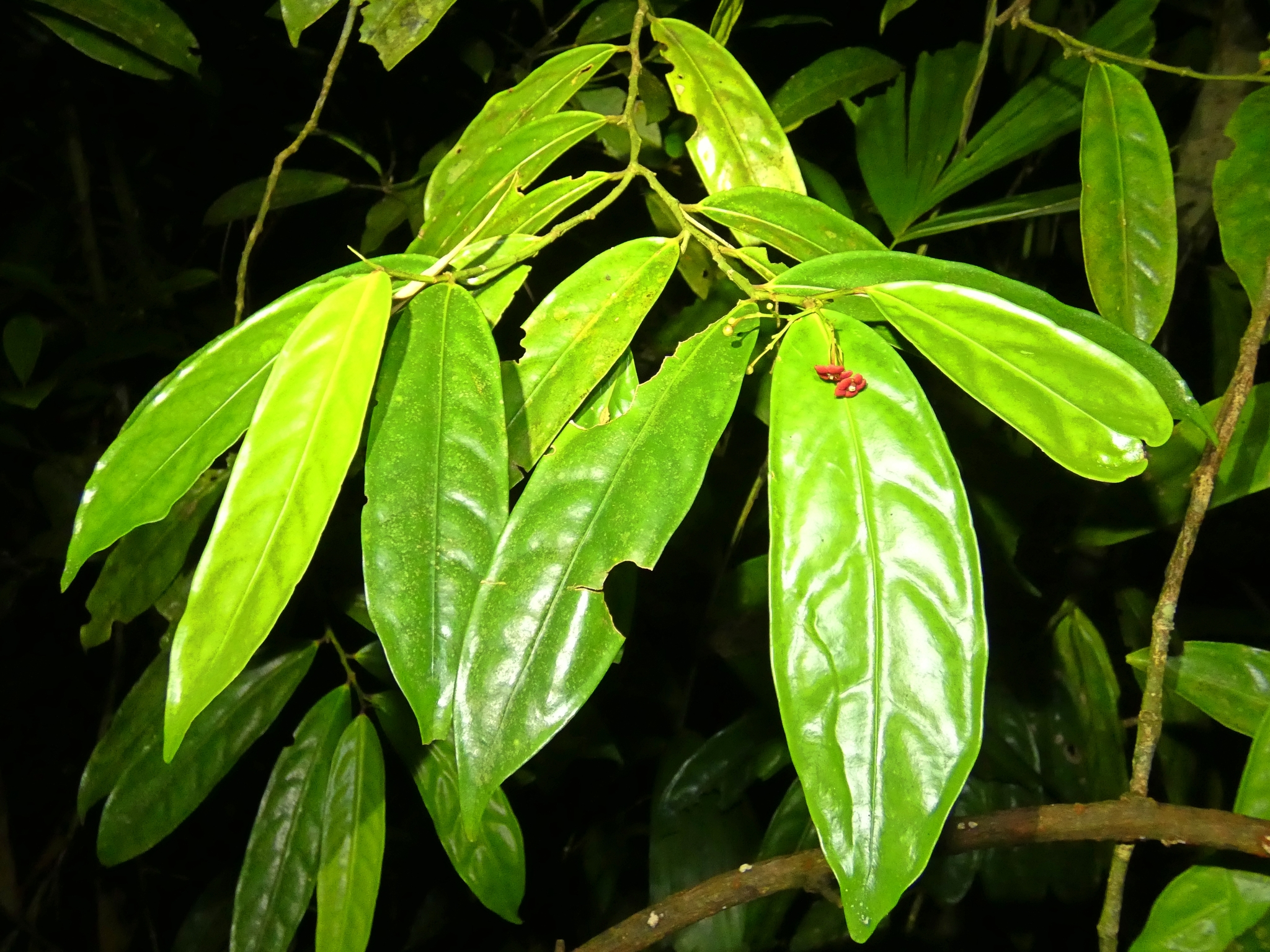
Foliage and flowers

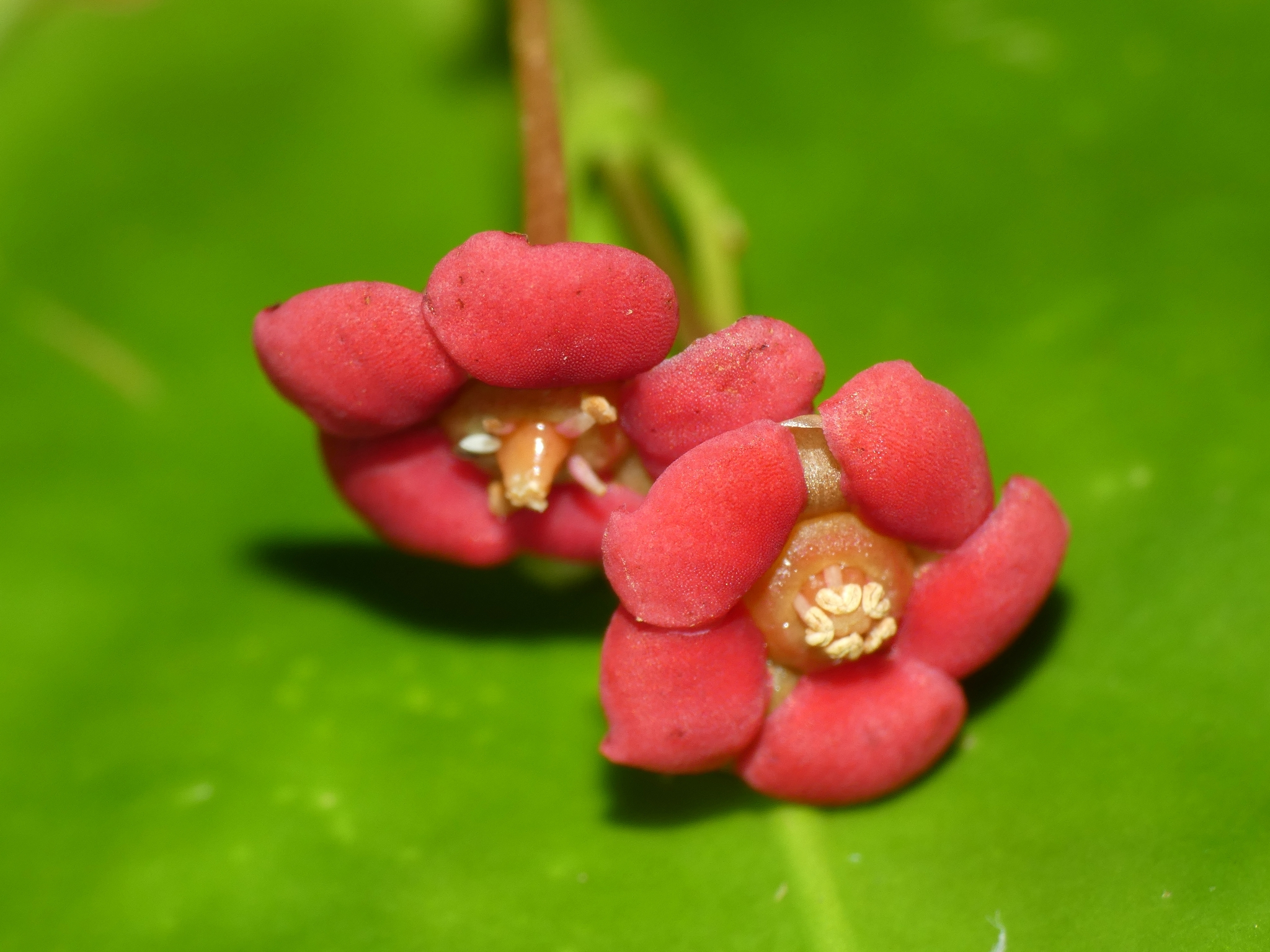
Flowers

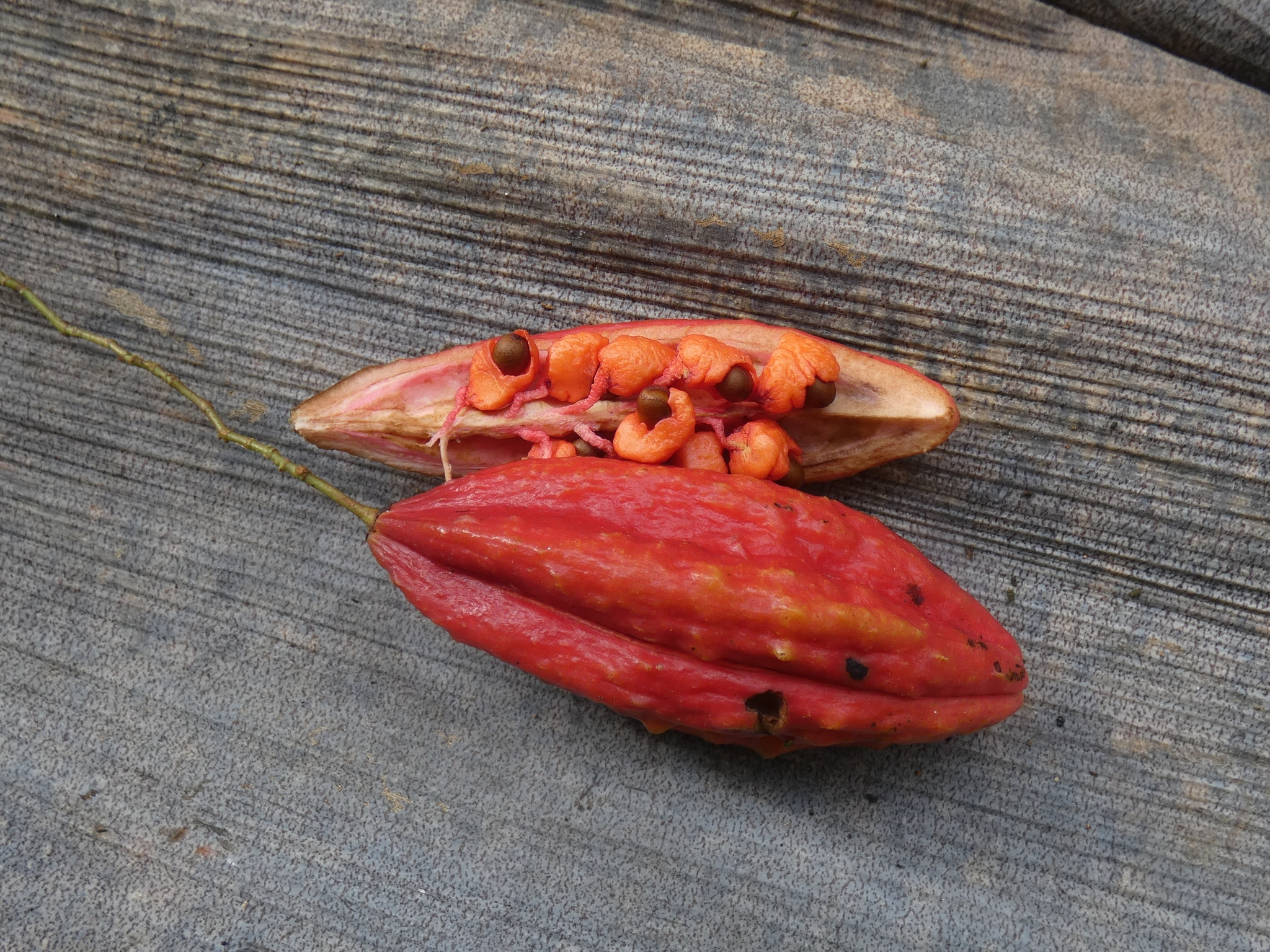
Fruit
