= Macgregoria =

Macgregoria is the scientific name of two genera of organisms and may refer to:

- Macgregoria (bird), monotypic bird genus containing MacGregor's honeyeater (M. pulchra)
- Macgregoria (plant), a monotypic plant genus in the family Celastraceae
