= Zinowiewia madsenii =

Conservation status
- Vulnerable (IUCN 3.1)

Scientific classification
- Kingdom: Plantae
- Clade: Tracheophytes
- Clade: Angiosperms
- Clade: Eudicots
- Clade: Rosids
- Order: Celastrales
- Family: Celastraceae
- Genus: Zinowiewia
- Species: Z. madsenii

Binomial name
- Zinowiewia madsenii C.Ulloa & P.Jørg.

Species of flowering plant

Zinowiewia madsenii is a species of plant in the family Celastraceae. It is endemic to Ecuador. Its natural habitat is subtropical or tropical moist montane forests. It is threatened by habitat loss.

== Description ==
Zinowiewia madsenii are densely branched shrubs or trees that can reach up to 15 meters high. It has coriaceous leaves which are 1.8 to 3 cm long and 1.4 to 1.8 cm wide. It has green flowers with 5 petals. Its samaras are light green, 14 to 19 mm long, and 4 to 7.5 mm wide.
