= Lydenburgia abbottii =

Conservation status
- Endangered (SANBI Red List)

Scientific classification
- Kingdom: Plantae
- Clade: Tracheophytes
- Clade: Angiosperms
- Clade: Eudicots
- Clade: Rosids
- Order: Celastrales
- Family: Celastraceae
- Genus: Lydenburgia
- Species: L. abbottii

Binomial name
- Lydenburgia abbottii (A.E.van Wyk & M.Prins) Steenkamp, A.E.van Wyk & M.Prins (2002)

Synonyms
- Catha abbottii (A.E.van Wyk) A.E.van Wyk & Prins

Species of flowering plants

Lydenburgia abbottii, commonly known as the Pondo bushman's tea (Afrikaans: Pondo-boesmanstee), is a rare species of tree only found in two river gorges less than 10 km (6.2 mi) apart on the KwaZulu-Natal / Eastern Cape border, South Africa.

== Distribution and habitat ==
Lydenburgia abbottii is endemic to the Pondoland region in deep ravines amongst subtropical Pondoland-Natal Sandstone Coastal Sourveld vegetation. It is found in the Umtamvuna Nature Reserve, with the majority of the population found along unprotected tributaries of the Mzamba River.

== Conservation status ==
Lydenburgia abbottii has been classified as endangered due to only being found in two river gorges (kloofs), where there are four subpopulations with fewer than 50 mature individuals in each. There are less than 200 mature individual trees in total. The tree is protected in South Africa.
