= Tontelea hondurensis =

Conservation status
- Critically Endangered (IUCN 2.3)

Scientific classification
- Kingdom: Plantae
- Clade: Tracheophytes
- Clade: Angiosperms
- Clade: Eudicots
- Clade: Rosids
- Order: Celastrales
- Family: Celastraceae
- Genus: Tontelea
- Species: T. hondurensis

Binomial name
- Tontelea hondurensis A.C.Sm.

Species of flowering plant

Tontelea hondurensis is a species of flowering plant in the family Celastraceae. It is a tree native to the tropical Americas, with a disjunct distribution in Belize, Chiapas, Guatemala, Honduras, Costa Rica, Panama, Ecuador, and Venezuela.

The species was first described by Albert Charles Smith in 1940.
