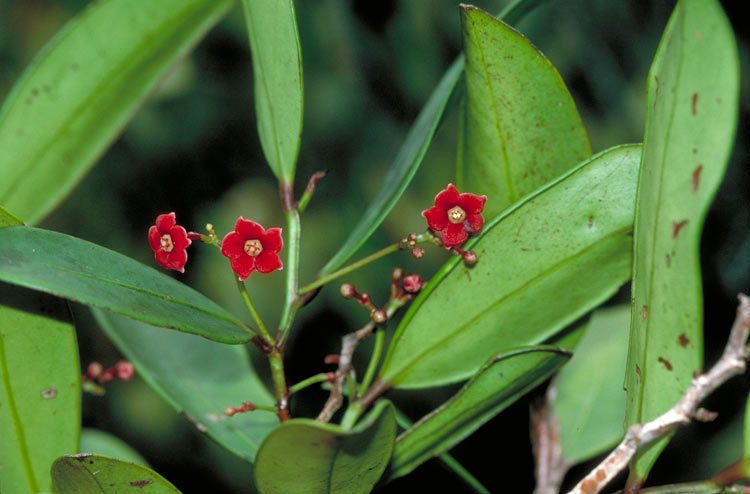
- Flowers and foliage

Conservation status
- Least Concern (NCA)

Scientific classification
- Kingdom: Plantae
- Clade: Tracheophytes
- Clade: Angiosperms
- Clade: Eudicots
- Clade: Rosids
- Order: Celastrales
- Family: Celastraceae
- Genus: Hypsophila
- Species: H. halleyana

Binomial name
- Hypsophila halleyana F.Muell.

Synonyms
- Drimys oblonga S.Moore

= Hypsophila halleyana =

Species of flowering plant

Hypsophila halleyana is a species of plants in the family Celastraceae, found only in the Wet Tropics bioregion of Queensland, Australia. It is a small stunted tree to about 12 m (39 ft) tall which grows only on the upper slopes of Mount Bellenden Ker and Mount Bartle Frere, at altitudes between 1,300 and 1,600 m (4,300 and 5,200 ft). Despite its extremely restricted range it is not considered to be endangered. It was first described by German-Australian botanist Ferdinand von Mueller in 1887.

== Conservation ==
This species is listed as least concern under the Queensland Government's Nature Conservation Act. As of 6 May 2024, it has not been assessed by the International Union for Conservation of Nature (IUCN).
