= Parnassiaceae =

Family of flowering plants

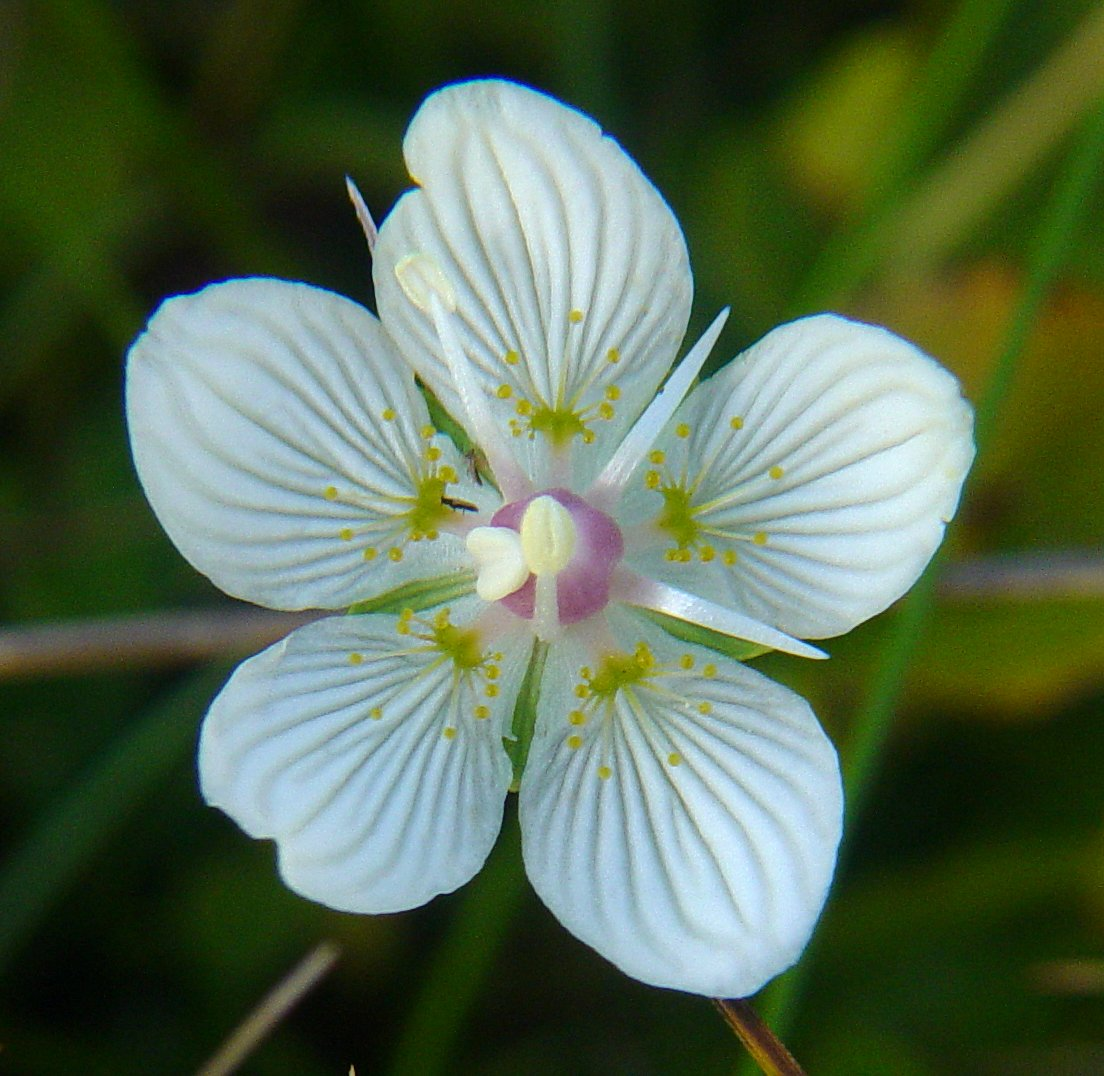
Parnassia palustris (Northern grass of Parnassus)

Parnassiaceae Gray were a family of flowering plants in the eudicot order Celastrales. The family is not recognized in the APG III system of plant classification. When that system was published in 2009, Parnassiaceae were treated as subfamily Parnassioideae of an expanded family Celastraceae.

The family had only two genera, Lepuropetalon and Parnassia. Lepuropetalon has only one species, Lepuropetalon spathulatum, a winter annual that usually prefers sandy soil. It is one of the smallest of flowering plants, up to 2 cm tall. Lepuropetalon has a disjunct distribution, being known from the southeastern United States and central Chile, but is probably far more common than has been reported.

Parnassia is a genus of perennial herbs, up to 60 cm tall, that grow in bogs, marshes, and other wet areas, mostly in cool to cold climates of the north temperate zone. There are at least 70 species. Sixty-three species occur in China and 49 of these occur nowhere else. A second area of diversity for Parnassia is North America and about 9 species occur there. Parnassia palustris is the most well known and widely distributed species. It ranges through most of northern Eurasia, Canada, and the western United States. Parnassia palustris is widely cultivated. About 10 species are known in cultivation, all as ornamentals.

== Description ==
The Parnassiaceae are rhizomatous perennial herbs (Parnassia) or winter annuals without a rhizome (Lepuropetalon). The youngest part of the stem has three collateral vascular bundles. On the stems, leaves, and flowers, the epidermis has sacs filled with tannin. The leaves are alternate or subopposite, without stipules, and the margins are entire. The leaf blade is wide compared to its length and the secondary venation is subpalmate.

In Parnassia, the leaves are crowded into a basal rosette with a few cauline leaves above. The leaves are all cauline in Lepuropetalon.

In both genera, the lower cauline leaves are pseudosessile, which means that the petioles are adnate to the stems. The upper cauline leaves, if present, are truly sessile.

The inflorescence consists of one, or rarely two, flowers that face upward and are at the end of a peduncle that has few or no leaves. The flowers are perfect and slightly zygomorphic. The five sepals are shortly connate at their bases, and persistent through maturity of the fruit. The petals are either absent, or five and free from each other. In Parnassia, the petals are showy and white or cream, with conspicuous veins that are usually green or gray. The margins are entire, toothed, or fimbriate. In Lepuropetalon, the petals are rudimentary or absent.

In both genera, the five stamens are free from each other. They are placed opposite the sepals and therefore alternate with the petals. The anthers open in sequence above the gynoecium (see next section). The five staminodes are free and placed opposite the petals. They mature after the stamens. Each consists of a nectariferous pad with filamentous rays arising from its edge. Each ray is terminated by a large globular gland.

The ovary is superior or half inferior and consists of 3 or 4, rarely 5, fused carpels. The walls of the carpels are incomplete so that the ovary is unilocular in its upper part. The placentation is parietal. The ovules are attached to T-shaped placentas in Parnassia, and directly to the ovary wall in Lepuropetalon. The style is absent or very short. The stigmas are decurrent along the commissures of the ovary and sometimes extended above, to form false styles called stylodia. The stigmatic areas are dry. The megagametophyte is of the ''Polygonum'' type.

The fruit is an erect, membranous capsule, which opens at the apex only. The seeds are small, light, and numerous.

== Oddities ==
Parnassias are often grown as curiosities for their unique and prominent staminodes. Further examination reveals additional oddities.

The lowest leaves on the stem appear to be sessile, but in fact the petiole is adnate to the stem and embedded in it. The conductive vessels that enervate the leaf depart from those of the stem far below where the leaf is attached.

As soon as the flower opens, the stamens begin to elongate. One of them bends inward, opens the thecae of its anther, and dumps its pollen on the ovary. It then bends away from the ovary to the outside of the flower. Another stamen then repeats this process. It takes about one day for a stamen to complete its motions, and the order in which they do so varies from one flower to another.

The area that is receptive to pollen, the stigmatic area, is not confined to the apex of the ovary or mounted on a style as in most flowers, but extends in bands down the sides of the ovary along the commissures, the seams where the carpels that compose the ovary are joined together. Such commissural stigmas have been discovered in Celastraceae, but as late as 1972, they were known only from Parnassiaceae and from the basal eudicot family Papaveraceae.

Lepuropetalon shares with Parnassia the pseudosessile leaves and the commissural stigmas. It also dumps its pollen on the ovary, but without the elaborate dance of the stamens. Unlike Parnassia, however, its staminodes are small and lack glands.

== Relationships ==
The genus Parnassia was named by Linnaeus in 1753 for Mount Parnassus in Greece. In 1821, Samuel Frederick Gray put Parnassia in its own family, Parnassiaceae. In that same year, Stephen Elliott gave Lepuropetalon its name and published a description of it. The name is from two Greek words, lepyron, "husk, rind, or shell", and petalon, "leaf or petal".

In 1930, botanist Adolf Engler published descriptions of Lepuropetalon and Parnassia with detailed illustrations. He did not consider them to be closely related and placed each in its own subfamily among the 15 subfamilies that he recognized in Saxifragaceae. Others thought that they were closely related. One of these was Steven Spongberg, who did a detailed study of Lepuropetalon and placed it in Saxifragaceae in the same subfamily with Parnassia. Most authors have followed Engler or Spongberg in their treatment of these two genera, but often with considerable doubt. Several other possible relationships have been proposed.

In 2001, a DNA study showed that Lepuropetalon and Parnassia were much closer to each other than to any others. This was the first DNA study to give strong statistical support (98% bootstrap support) for this relationship.

In 2005, a study of flower structure concluded that the family Parnassiaceae belonged in the order Celastrales with Lepidobotryaceae, and a broadly defined Celastraceae, including Mortonia and Pottingeria.

In 2006, a study of DNA sequences confirmed that Lepuropetalon and Parnassia form a strongly supported clade. This study also showed strong support for a pentatomy consisting of Pottingeria, Mortonia, Parnassiaceae, and two clades of genera from Celastraceae as that family had been circumscribed in APG II. The relationships between these five clades remain unresolved.

In 2009, the Angiosperm Phylogeny Group expanded the family Celastraceae to consist of the five clades of the pentatomy mentioned above. A phylogenetic infrafamilial classification of Celastraceae sensu APG III has not yet been published.
