= Zinowiewia integerrima =

Conservation status
- Least Concern (IUCN 3.1)

Scientific classification
- Kingdom: Plantae
- Clade: Tracheophytes
- Clade: Angiosperms
- Clade: Eudicots
- Clade: Rosids
- Order: Celastrales
- Family: Celastraceae
- Genus: Zinowiewia
- Species: Z. integerrima

Binomial name
- Zinowiewia integerrima (Turcz.) Turcz. (1859)

Synonyms
- Wimmeria integerrima Turcz. (1858); Zinowiewia costaricensis Lundell (1938); Zinowiewia inaequifolia L.O.Williams (1964); Zinowiewia ovata Lundell (1940); Zinowiewia revoluta Lundell (1987)

Species of tree

Zinowiewia integerrima is a species of tree in the family Celastraceae. It ranges from northeastern Mexico through Central America to northern Colombia. It is threatened by habitat loss. The plant is used medicinally.

Trees grow up to 13 meters. It has very small, round flowers with five petals. It flowers in March and April. Its fruits have one or two seeds, whereas all other Zinoweiwia species have only one seed. The leaves are also smaller than other species.
