= Dicarpellum =

Scientific classification
- Kingdom: Plantae
- Clade: Tracheophytes
- Clade: Angiosperms
- Clade: Eudicots
- Clade: Rosids
- Order: Celastrales
- Family: Celastraceae
- Genus: Dicarpellum (Loes.) A.C.Sm.

Genus of flowering plants

Dicarpellum is a genus of shrubs and small trees in the family Celastraceae. The genus is endemic to New Caledonia in the Pacific and contains four species. Its closest relative is Hypsophila from Australia.

== List of species ==
- Dicarpellum baillonianum (Loes.) A.C.Sm.
- Dicarpellum pancheri (Baill.) A.C.Sm.
- Dicarpellum paucisepalum Hürl. ex M.P.Simmons
- Dicarpellum pronyense (Guillaumin) A.C.Sm.
