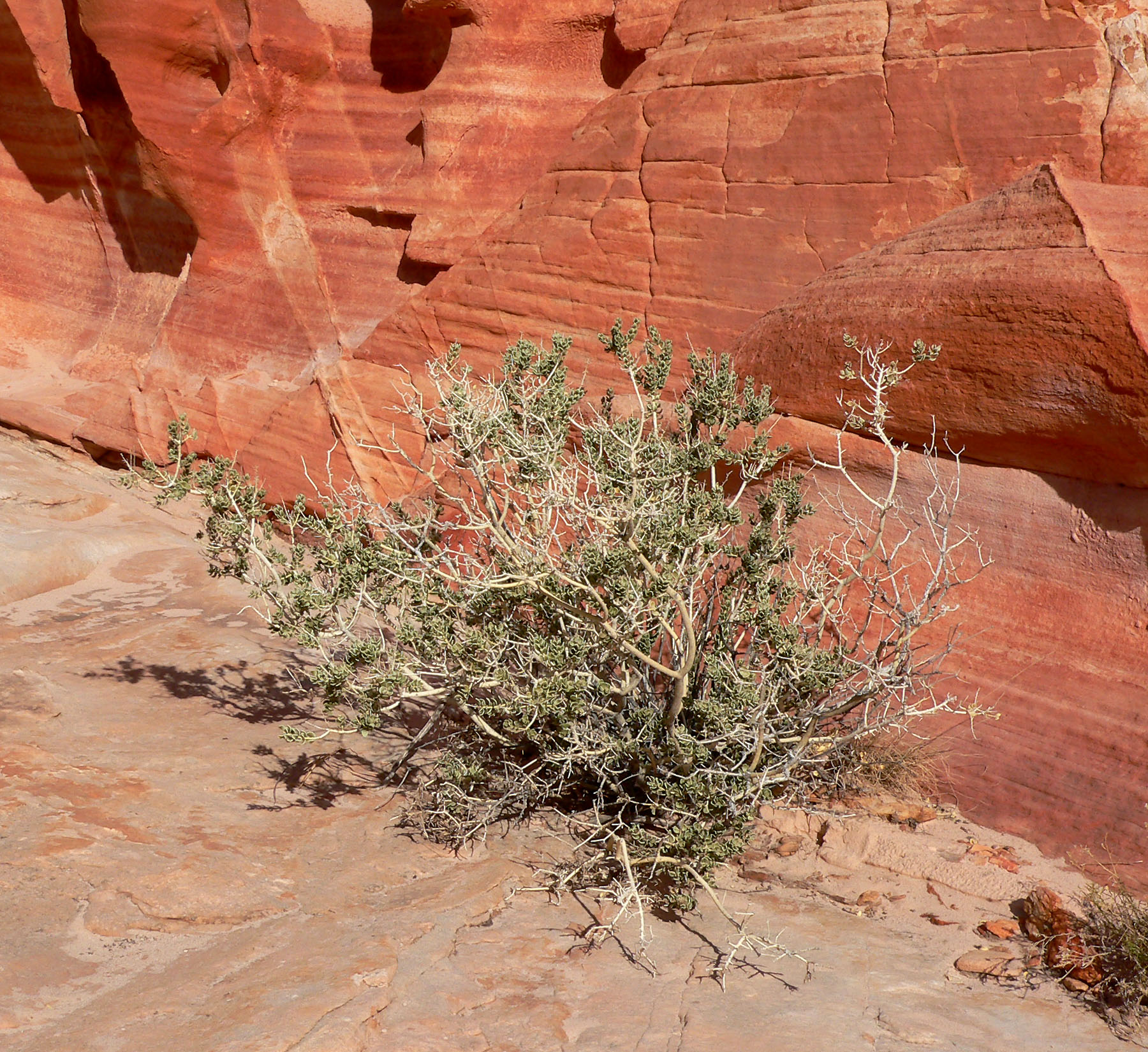

Scientific classification
- Kingdom: Plantae
- Clade: Tracheophytes
- Clade: Angiosperms
- Clade: Eudicots
- Clade: Rosids
- Order: Celastrales
- Family: Celastraceae
- Genus: Mortonia
- Species: M. utahensis

Binomial name
- Mortonia utahensis (Coville ex A.Gray) A.Nels.

= Mortonia utahensis =

Utah mortonia

Species of flowering plant

Mortonia utahensis is a species of flowering plant in the family Celastraceae known by the common name Utah mortonia. It is native to the southwestern United States, where it grows in desert and mountain scrub and woodland, often on limestone substrates. It is a broomlike shrub growing erect to a maximum height near 1.2 meters. Its branching stems are white to gray in color and rough-haired. The thick, curling, concave leaves are oval in shape, pointed or rounded at the tip, and up to about 1.5 centimeters long. The inflorescence is a narrow panicle of many flowers with five rough greenish sepals and five thin white petals a few millimeters long. The fruit is a cluster of nutlets.
