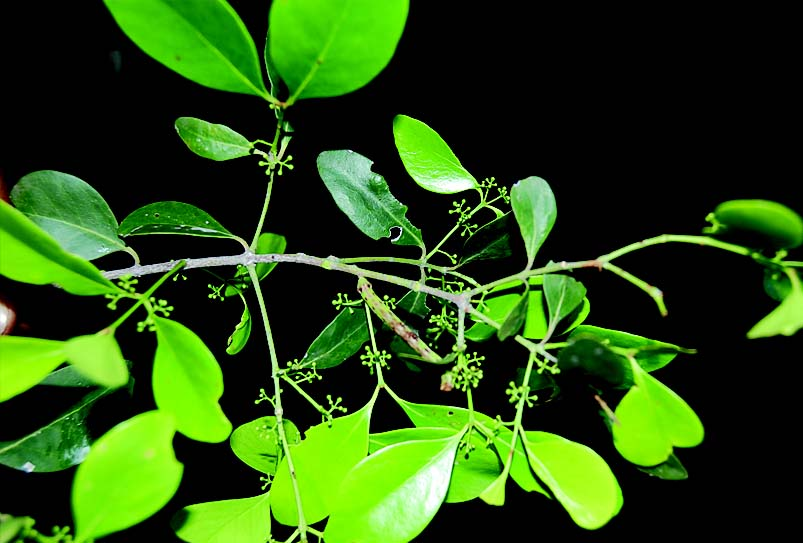
- Pleurostylia opposita

Scientific classification
- Kingdom: Plantae
- Clade: Tracheophytes
- Clade: Angiosperms
- Clade: Eudicots
- Clade: Rosids
- Order: Celastrales
- Family: Celastraceae
- Genus: Pleurostylia; Wight & Arn.

Species
- 6; see text

Synonyms
- Boottia Ayers ex Baker; Cathastrum Turcz.; Herya Cordem.

= Pleurostylia =

Family of shrubs

Pleurostylia is a small genus of shrubs in the family Celastraceae. It includes six species native to central and Southern Africa, Madagascar and the Mascarene Islands, parts of tropical Asia, New Guinea, Queensland, and Vanuatu.

== Species ==
Six species are accepted.

- Pleurostylia africana Loes. – Kenya and Democratic Republic of the Congo to Angola, Zimbabwe, and Mozambique
- Pleurostylia capensis Oliv. – South Africa and Eswatini
- Pleurostylia leucocarpa Baker – Mauritius
- Pleurostylia opposita (Wall.) Alston – eastern Mozambique to Madagascar, Mauritius, Sri Lanka, India, Indochina, Hainan, the Philippines, New Guinea, Queensland, and Vanuatu)
- Pleurostylia pachyphloea Tul. – Réunion
- Pleurostylia putamen Marais – Rodrigues
