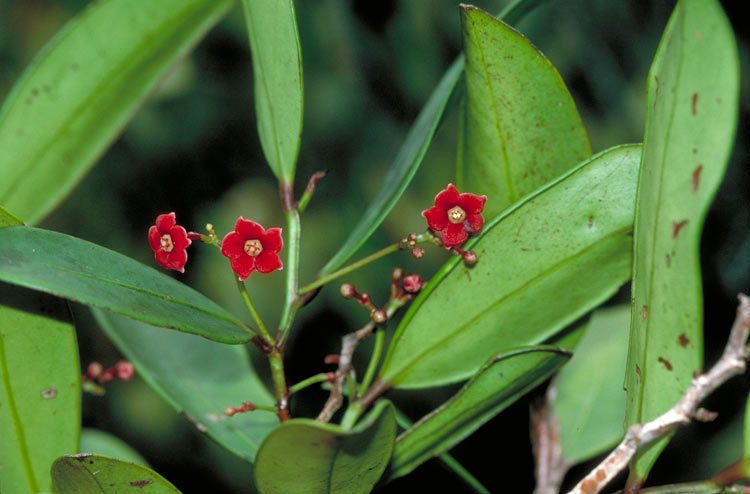
- Hypsophila halleyana

Scientific classification
- Kingdom: Plantae
- Clade: Tracheophytes
- Clade: Angiosperms
- Clade: Eudicots
- Clade: Rosids
- Order: Celastrales
- Family: Celastraceae
- Genus: Hypsophila; F.Muell.

Type species
- Hypsophila halleyana F.Muell.

Species
- see text

= Hypsophila (plant) =

Genus of flowering plants

Hypsophila is a genus of flowering plants in the family Celastraceae, containing just two described species. It is endemic to the Wet Tropics world heritage area of Queensland, Australia.

== Description ==
Plants in this genus are glabrous (without hairs) shrubs or trees. The twigs have longitudinal ridges or wings between each pair of leaves. Flowers may be solitary or in a cymose inflorescence; they have five petals and five sepals. The fruit is a three-valved capsule.

== Species ==
As of 20 May 2026, two species are recognised:

- Hypsophila dielsiana Loes.
- Hypsophila halleyana F.Muell.
