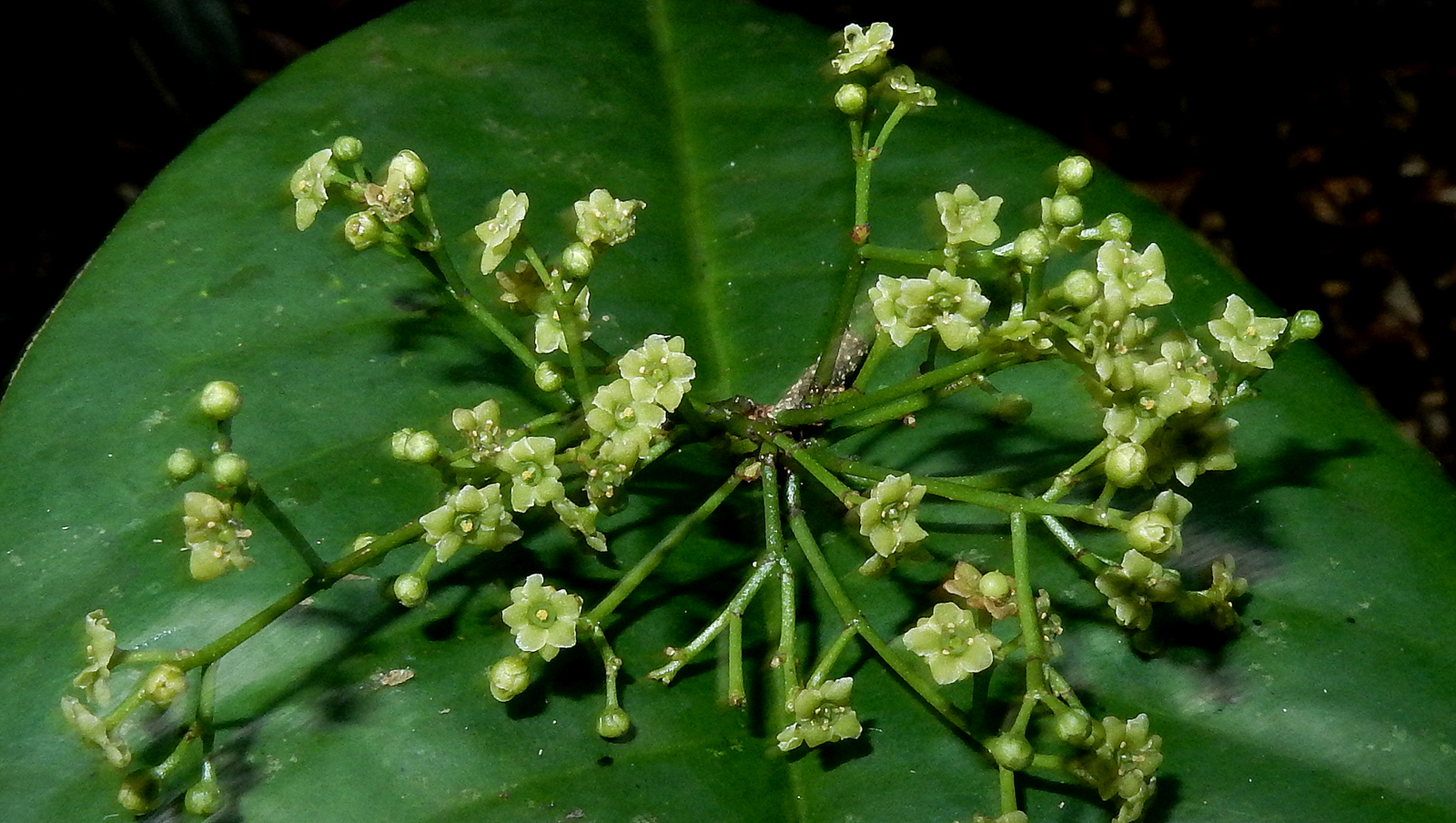
- Tontelea mauritioides

Scientific classification
- Kingdom: Plantae
- Clade: Tracheophytes
- Clade: Angiosperms
- Clade: Eudicots
- Clade: Rosids
- Order: Celastrales
- Family: Celastraceae
- Genus: Tontelea; Miers

= Tontelea =

Genus of flowering plants

Tontelea is a genus of flowering plants in the family Celastraceae. It includes 19 species native to the tropical Americas, ranging from southeastern Mexico through Central America and tropical South America to Bolivia and southern Brazil.

== Species ==
As of March 2026, Plants of the World Online accepts 19 species.

- Tontelea attenuata Miers
- Tontelea congestiflora (A.C.Sm.) A.C.Sm.
- Tontelea corcovadensis A.C.Sm.
- Tontelea coriacea A.C.Sm.
- Tontelea corymbosa (Huber) A.C.Sm.
- Tontelea cylindrocarpa (A.C.Sm.) A.C.Sm.
- Tontelea emarginata A.C.Sm.
- Tontelea fuliginea Lombardi
- Tontelea hondurensis A.C.Sm.
- Tontelea lanceolata (Miers) A.C.Sm.
- Tontelea laxiflora (Benth.) A.C.Sm.
- Tontelea leptophylla A.C.Sm.
- Tontelea martiana (Miers) A.C.Sm.
- Tontelea mauritioides (A.C.Sm.) A.C.Sm.
- Tontelea micrantha (Mart.) A.C.Sm.
- Tontelea miersii (Peyr.) A.C.Sm.
- Tontelea passiflora (Vell.) Lombardi
- Tontelea sandwithii A.C.Sm.
- Tontelea tenuicula (Miers) A.C.Sm.
