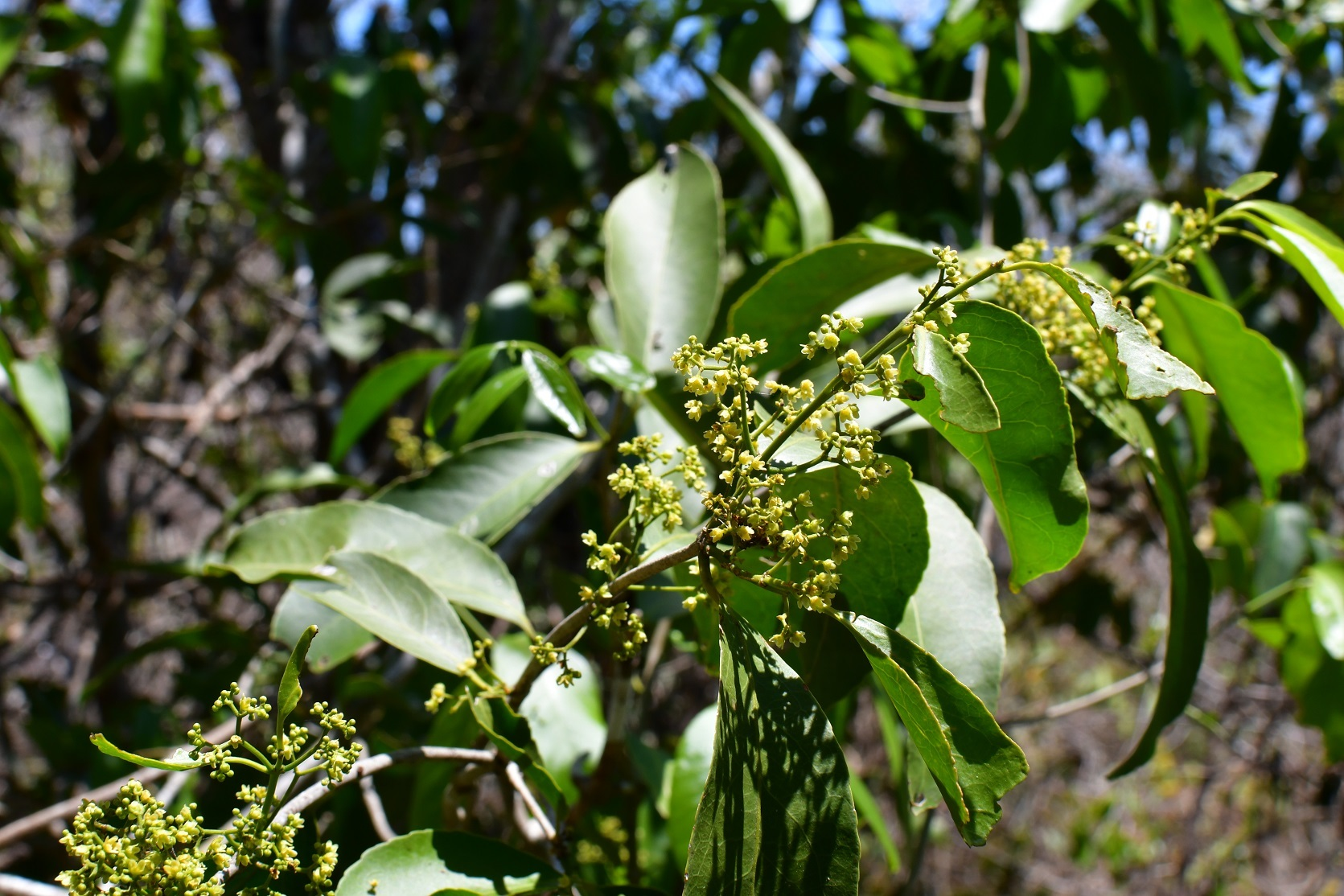
- Pristimera celastroides

Scientific classification
- Kingdom: Plantae
- Clade: Tracheophytes
- Clade: Angiosperms
- Clade: Eudicots
- Clade: Rosids
- Order: Celastrales
- Family: Celastraceae
- Genus: Pristimera; Miers

Synonyms
- Simirestis N.Hallé

= Pristimera =

Genus of plants

Pristimera is a genus of flowering plants belonging to the family Celastraceae. It includes 37 species native to tropical and subtropical regions of the Americas (Mexico to northern Argentina), tropical and southern Africa, Madagascar, India, and Borneo.

== Species ==
37 species are accepted.

- Pristimera andongensis (Welw. ex Oliv.) N.Hallé
- Pristimera arnottiana (Wight) R.H.Archer
- Pristimera atractaspis (N.Hallé) R.H.Archer
- Pristimera austin-smithii (Lundell) A.C.Sm.
- Pristimera biholongii N.Hallé
- Pristimera bojeri (Tul.) N.Hallé
- Pristimera breteleri N.Hallé
- Pristimera brianii (N.Hallé) R.H.Archer
- Pristimera caudata Mennega
- Pristimera celastroides (Kunth) A.C.Sm.
- Pristimera coriacea (C.Wright ex Griseb.) Miers
- Pristimera dariensis Mennega
- Pristimera delagoensis (Loes.) R.H.Archer
- Pristimera dewildemaniana (N.Hallé) R.H.Archer
- Pristimera fimbriata (Exell) R.H.Archer
- Pristimera glaga (Korth.) N.Hallé
- Pristimera goetzei (Loes.) R.H.Archer
- Pristimera holdeniana (A.C.Sm.) A.C.Sm.
- Pristimera klaineana (N.Hallé) R.H.Archer
- Pristimera longipetiolata (Oliv.) N.Hallé
- Pristimera luteoviridis (Exell) N.Hallé
- Pristimera malifolia (Baker) N.Hallé
- Pristimera mouilensis (N.Hallé) N.Hallé
- Pristimera nervosa (Miers) A.C.Sm.
- Pristimera paniculata (Vahl) N.Hallé
- Pristimera peglerae (Loes.) R.H.Archer
- Pristimera plumbea (Blakelock & R.Wilczek) N.Hallé
- Pristimera polyantha (Loes.) N.Hallé
- Pristimera scheffleri (Loes.) R.H.Archer
- Pristimera sclerophylla Lombardi
- Pristimera staudtii (Loes.) R.H.Archer
- Pristimera tenuiflora (Mart. ex Peyr.) A.C.Sm.
- Pristimera tetramera (H.Perrier) N.Hallé
- Pristimera tisserantii (N.Hallé) R.H.Archer
- Pristimera tulasnei (Drake) N.Hallé
- Pristimera unguiculata (Loes.) R.H.Archer
- Pristimera verrucosa (Kunth) Miers
