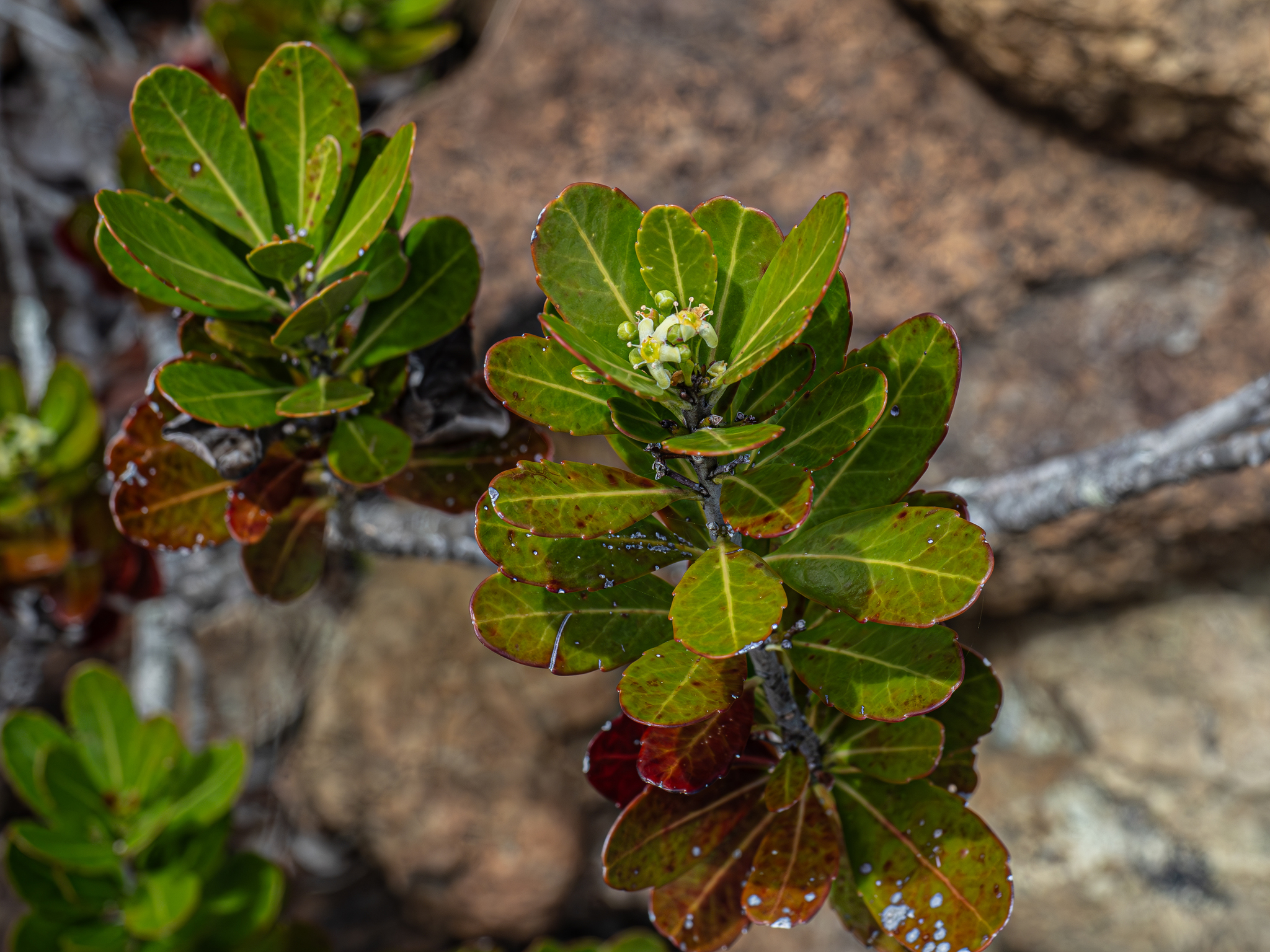
- Peripterygia marginata

Conservation status
- Least Concern (IUCN 3.1)

Scientific classification
- Kingdom: Plantae
- Clade: Tracheophytes
- Clade: Angiosperms
- Clade: Eudicots
- Clade: Rosids
- Order: Celastrales
- Family: Celastraceae
- Genus: Peripterygia; Loes.
- Species: P. marginata

Binomial name
- Peripterygia marginata (Baill.) Loes.

= Peripterygia =

Genus of shrubs

Peripterygia marginata is a species of shrubs in the family Celastraceae. It is endemic to New Caledonia and the only species of the genus Peripterygia. Its closest relatives are Crossopetalum and Siphonodon.
