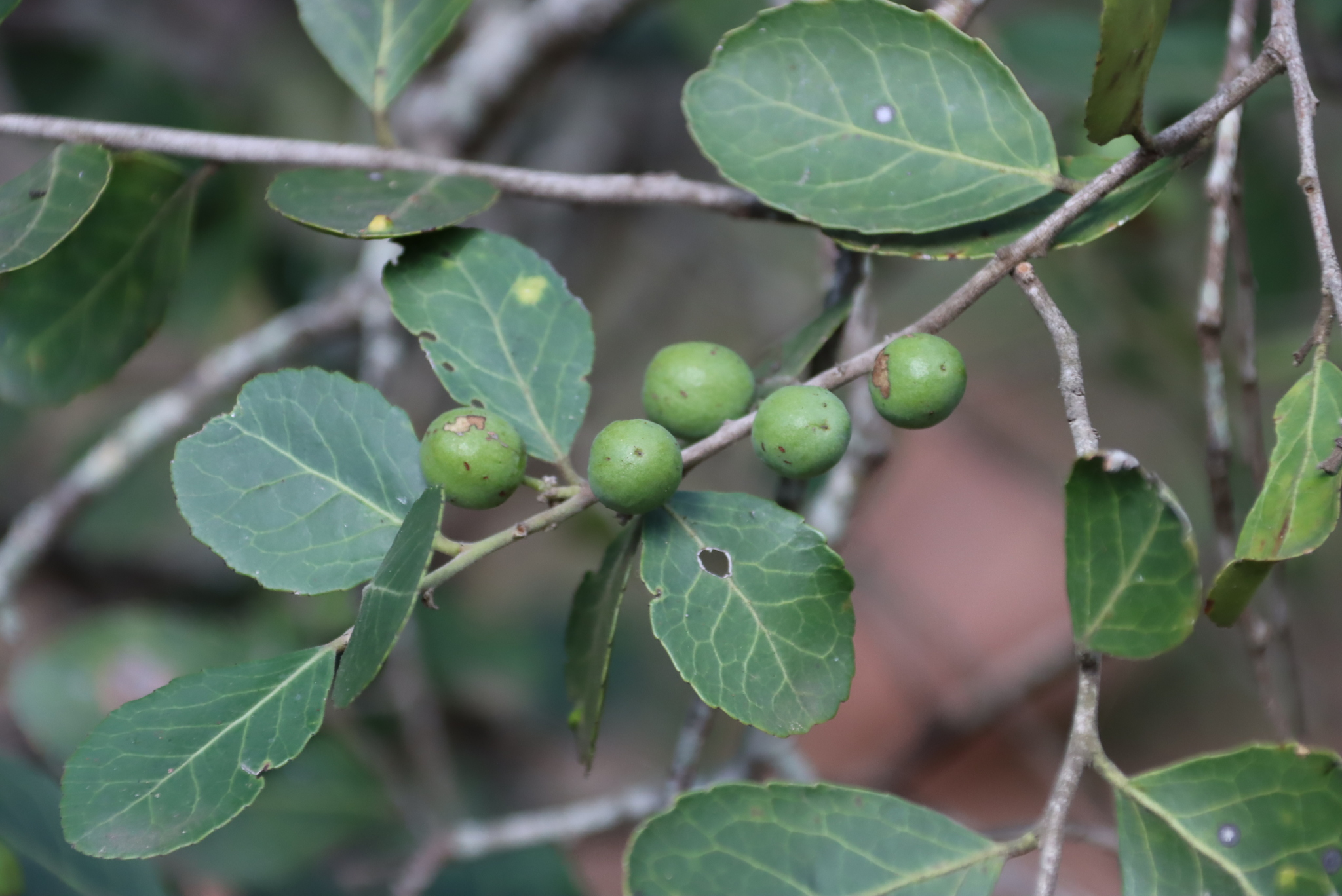
- Mystroxylon aethiopicum

Scientific classification
- Kingdom: Plantae
- Clade: Tracheophytes
- Clade: Angiosperms
- Clade: Eudicots
- Clade: Rosids
- Order: Celastrales
- Family: Celastraceae
- Genus: Mystroxylon; Eckl. & Zeyh.

= Mystroxylon =

Genus of plants

Mystroxylon is a genus of flowering plants belonging to the family Celastraceae.

Its native range is Tropical and Southern Africa, and the Western Indian Ocean.

== Species ==
Species:

- Mystroxylon aethiopicum (Thunb.) Loes.
- Mystroxylon comorense (Loes.) Loes.
