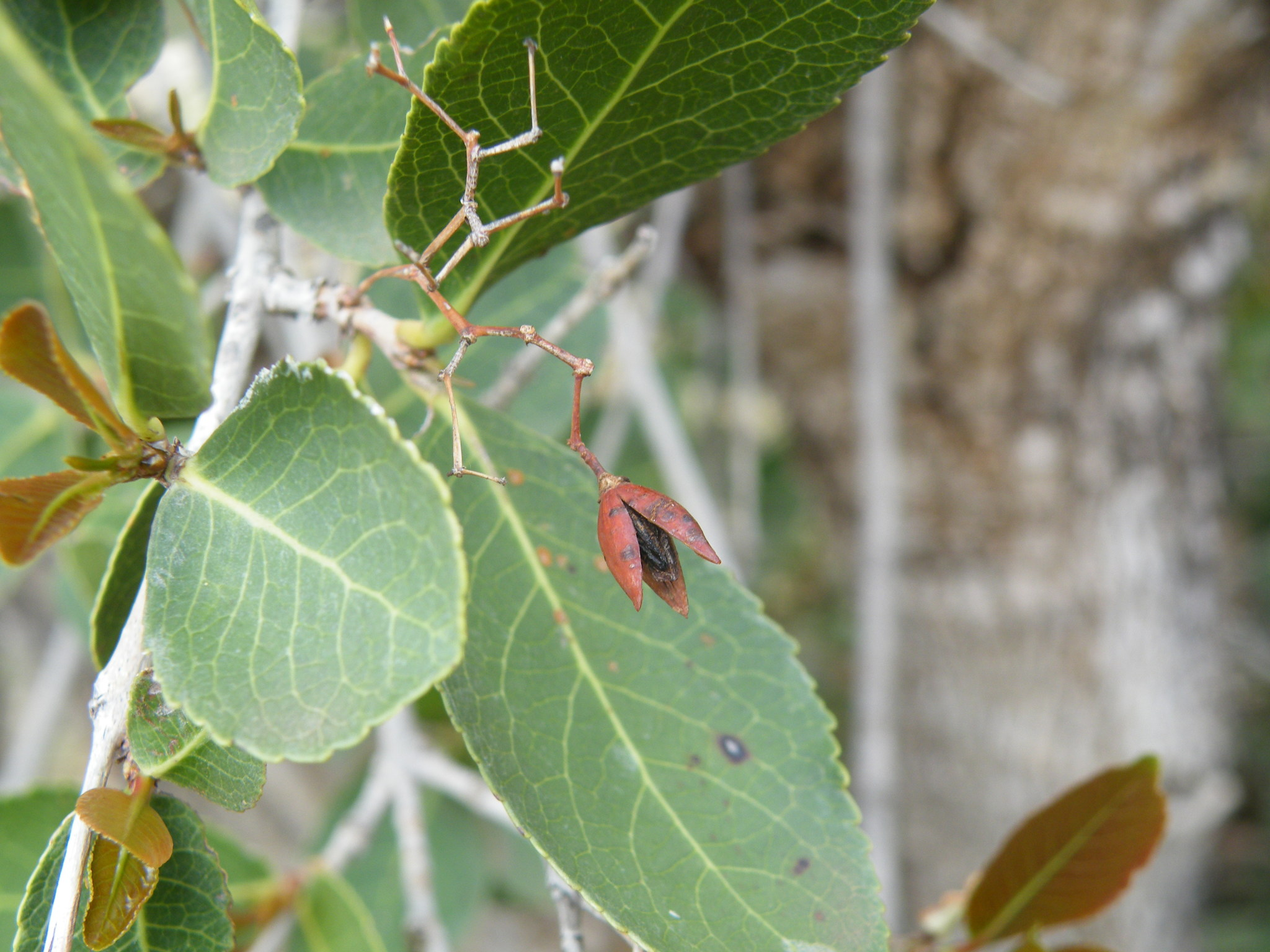
- Lydenburgia cassinoides

Scientific classification
- Kingdom: Plantae
- Clade: Tracheophytes
- Clade: Angiosperms
- Clade: Eudicots
- Clade: Rosids
- Order: Celastrales
- Family: Celastraceae
- Genus: Lydenburgia; N.Robson

Species
- Lydenburgia abbottii (A.E.van Wyk & M.Prins) Steenkamp, A.E.van Wyk & M.Prins; Lydenburgia cassinoides N.Robson

= Lydenburgia =

Genus of trees

Lydenburgia is a genus of flowering plants in the family Celastraceae. It includes two species which are endemic to South Africa.

Both species in this genus, Lydenburgia cassinoides (Sekhukhuni bushman's tea, Afrikaans: Sekhukhuni-boesmanstee) and Lydenburgia abbottii (Pondo bushman's tea, Afrikaans: Pondo-boesmanstee), are protected trees in South Africa.

== See also ==
- List of Southern African indigenous trees
