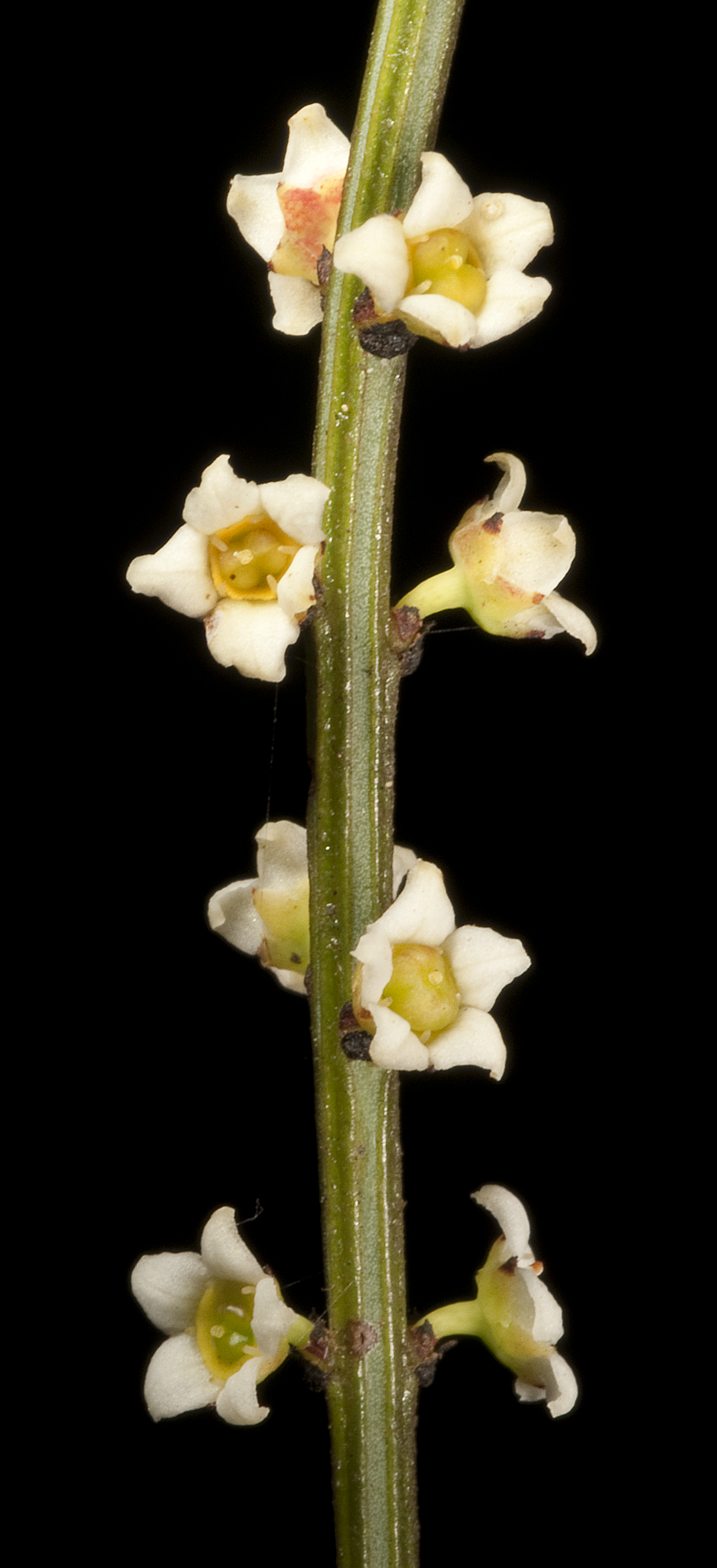

Scientific classification
- Kingdom: Plantae
- Clade: Tracheophytes
- Clade: Angiosperms
- Clade: Eudicots
- Clade: Rosids
- Order: Celastrales
- Family: Celastraceae
- Genus: Psammomoya; Diels & Loes.

= Psammomoya =

Genus of flowering plants

Psammomoya is a genus of plants in the family Celastraceae. The genus is endemic to Western Australia and was first described by Ludwig Diels and Ludwig Eduard Theodor Loesener in 1904, with the designated type species being Psammomoya choretroides.

There are four species in the genus:

- Psammomoya choretroides (F.Muell.) Diels & Loes.
- Psammomoya ephedroides Diels & Loes.
- Psammomoya grandiflora Keighery
- Psammomoya implexa Keighery

== Description ==
In Psammomoya, the leaves are opposite and decussate, and reduced to cataphylls (scales). The bracteoles are ovate and the floral disc is broad and fused.
