= Empleuridium =

Scientific classification
- Kingdom: Plantae
- Clade: Tracheophytes
- Clade: Angiosperms
- Clade: Eudicots
- Clade: Rosids
- Order: Celastrales
- Family: Celastraceae
- Genus: Empleuridium; Sond.
- Species: E. juniperinum

Binomial name
- Empleuridium juniperinum Sond. & Harv.

Genus of plants

Empleuridium is a genus of flowering plants belonging to the family Celastraceae, with a single species Empleuridium juniperinum. Its native range is the Cape Provinces of South Africa.

== Taxonomy ==
The genus and species were first named and the species described in Thesaurus Capensis published in 1859. This contained illustrations and brief descriptions of South African plants. A more systematic treatment of the genus and species appeared in Flora Capensis, the relevant part of which is dated to 1860. The author of the genus is given as Otto Wilhelm Sonder and the authors of the species as Sonder and William H. Harvey. The genus was originally tentatively assigned to the family Rutaceae, but a comprehensive study in 1985 showed that it belonged to the Celastraceae.
