= Plagiopteron =

Scientific classification
- Kingdom: Plantae
- Clade: Tracheophytes
- Clade: Angiosperms
- Clade: Eudicots
- Clade: Rosids
- Order: Celastrales
- Family: Celastraceae
- Genus: Plagiopteron; Griff. (1843)
- Species: P. suaveolens

Binomial name
- Plagiopteron suaveolens Griff. (1843)

Synonyms
- Plagiopteron chinensis X.X.Chen (1980); Plagiopteron fragrans Griff. (1843)

Genus of plants

Plagiopteron suaveolens is a species of flowering plant belonging to the family Celastraceae. It is a climbing shrub or liana native to southeastern China (southwestern Guangxi), Indo-China, and Assam. It is the sole species in genus Plagiopteron.
