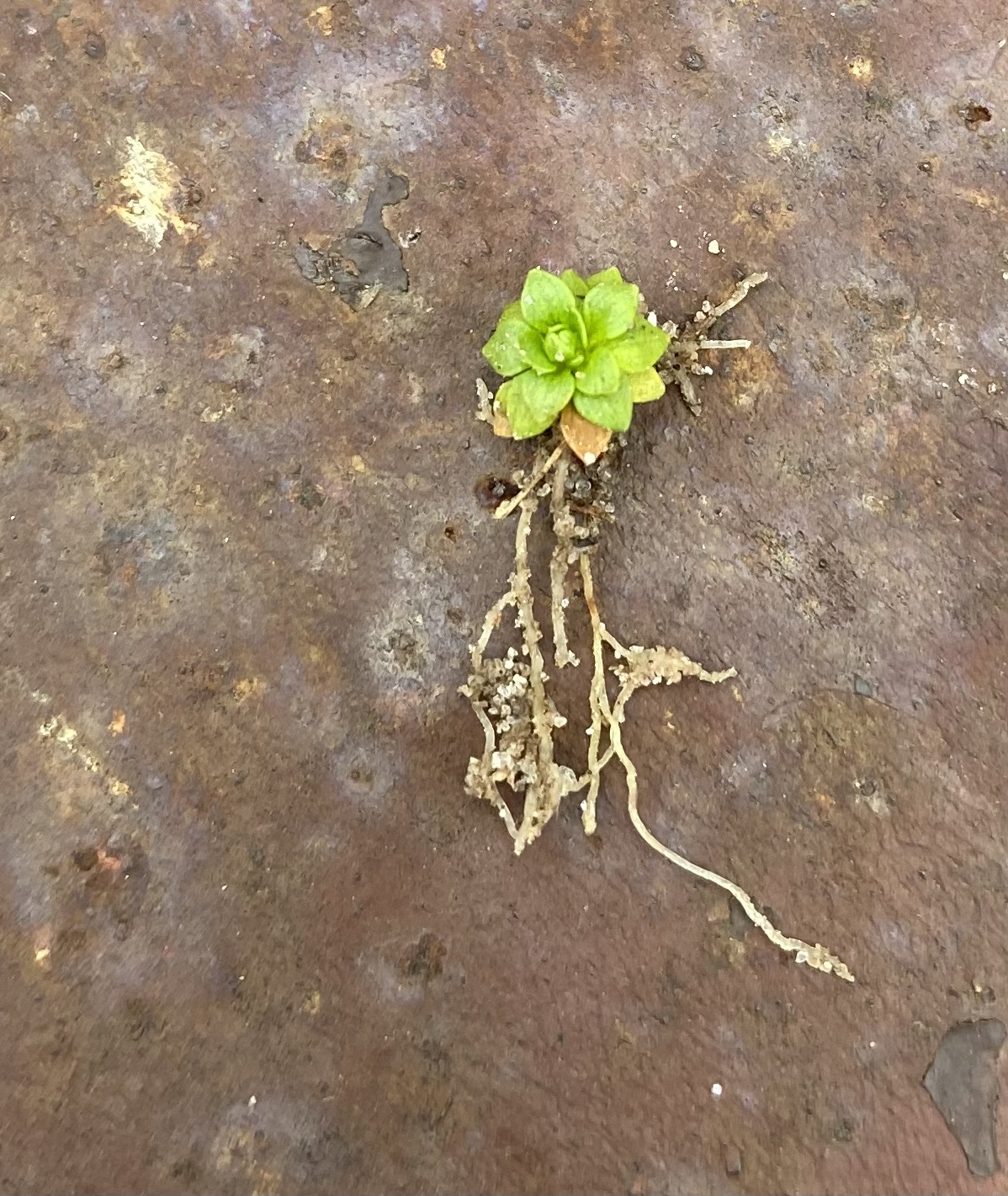
- Lepuropetalon spathulatum

Scientific classification
- Kingdom: Plantae
- Clade: Tracheophytes
- Clade: Angiosperms
- Clade: Eudicots
- Clade: Rosids
- Order: Celastrales
- Family: Celastraceae
- Subfamily: Parnassioideae
- Genus: Lepuropetalon; Elliott
- Species: L. spathulatum

Binomial name
- Lepuropetalon spathulatum Elliott

Synonyms
- Cryptopetalum Hook. & Arn.; Cryptopetalum pusillum Hook. & Arn.; Lepuropetalon pusillum Gay; Pyxidanthera spatulata Muhl.

= Lepuropetalon =

Genus of plants

Lepuropetalon is a genus of flowering plants in the family Celastraceae containing only one species, Lepuropetalon spathulatum. It is a winter annual that is most abundant in eastern Texas and western Louisiana. From there, it occurs sporadically southward into Mexico, and eastward through the Atlantic and Gulf coastal plain, and rarely in the Piedmont Plateau, to North Carolina. It has a disjunct distribution. In addition to the area mentioned above, it is also found in Uruguay and central Chile.

Before 2009, Lepuropetalon had been placed with Parnassia in the family Parnassiaceae, now usually treated as a segregate of Celastraceae. In 2009, it was placed in the family Celastraceae by the Angiosperm Phylogeny Group's APG III system. When their most recent revision of Angiosperm classification was published in 2016, it retained its position in the family Celastraceae.

It is one of the smallest of terrestrial flowering plants and some consider it to be the smallest. Due its small size, petiteplant has been used as a common name. Because it is so easily overlooked, it is probably much more abundant than records indicate. It is found in moist areas, usually in soils that are sandy or derived from granite. It is common along the edges of soil-filled depressions on top of rocks. It is often seen in cemeteries and clearings for power lines. Because it is common in habitats that are maintained by humans but not subject to intensive cultivation, it is probably more abundant now than it was in the past.

In the United States and Mexico, the seeds germinate in January. It has been suggested that this is a response to increasing day length, yet no experiments have confirmed it. Flowering is in March and early April. Seed maturity follows quickly. Few plants survive beyond the end of April.

== Description ==
Lepuropetalon spathulatum is a diminutive winter annual. In favorable conditions, it forms a hemispherical tuft, up to 2 cm tall and wide, rarely larger. It often consists of no more than a single flower above a few tiny leaves, the whole plant being less than 5 mm high and 5mm across. The stems, leaves, and flowers are conspicuously dotted with epidermal sacs of tannin that tend to be arranged in lines. These are golden-brown or slightly reddish in color. The stems are rather thick and slightly angled. The leaves are alternate or subopposite in arrangement, sessile, long, and wide at the end like a spoon or spatula.

The flowers are solitary on the ends of stems, immediately above the leaves, and usually face upward. They are large compared to the rest of the plant, 2 to 3mm in diameter with male and female parts both present and functional. The calyx consists of five broad, often unequal sepals that are joined in the lower part to form a floral cup that encloses the lower half of the ovary and is thickened along its fissures to form five ribs. The sepals persist beyond the maturity of the fruit.

The petals are scale-like, white and barely visible, on the rim of the floral cup between the sepals, or sometimes absent. They die but remain, along with the sepals.

The five stamens are short and opposite the sepals. Initially, they are turned inward and dump their pollen on the ovary. Eventually, they are bent outward by the expansion of the ovary. The anthers are yellow, erect, and subglobular. The five staminodes are opposite the petals and dilated at the ends.

The gynoecium is unilocular and composed of three fused carpels. The ovules are numerous and attached near the margins of the carpels. The three stigmas are separate or initially joined at the base, but soon separating with growth of the ovary. The stigmas are commissural, meaning that the area that is receptive to pollen extends downward along the fissures where the carpels are joined.

The fruit is a capsule. The seeds are numerous and cylindrical, .15 to .2mm long, reddish when immature, and nearly black when ripe.

== History ==
Lepuropetalon spathulatum entered the botanical literature in 1813 with the publication by Henry Muhlenberg of Catalogus Plantarum Americae Septentrionalis (Catalog of the Plants of North America). Muhlenberg named the plant Pyxidanthera spatulata, but it is now known that Lepuropetalon is not related to Pyxidanthera, the latter being a member of the family Diapensiaceae in the order Ericales. Muhlenberg's name is, in any case, considered a nomen nudum because his description can not be used to identify the plant. Muhlenberg's information on this plant, and probably some specimens as well, almost certainly came from his friend and correspondent, Stephen Elliott of South Carolina. Parts of the herbaria created by Elliott and Muhlenberg are still preserved, but the specimens of Lepuropetalon are lost from both of them.

In 1817, Stephen Elliott published one of the booklets that would be combined in 1821 to become volume I of the work for which he is still remembered, A Sketch of the Botany of South Carolina and Georgia. In this book, he mentions Pyxidanthera spatulata, but gives the specific epithet the more conventional Latin spelling of "spathulatum". He departed from Muhlenberg's classification, however, by placing the plant in its own genus, which he named Lepuropetalon.

Elliott gave a very brief Latin description which he translated as

"Calyx 5 parted. Petals 5, resembling scales, inserted into the calyx.
Capsule free near the summit, 1 celled, 1 valved."

He then gave a detailed description of the plant and mentions that it had also been collected by William Baldwin.

Elliott wrote no etymology for the name, and subsequent authors have differed on its interpretation. All agree that the name is of Greek derivation and that "petalon" is the Greek term for "petal or leaf". However, some say that the first part is derived from lepyron, "a husk or shell", referring to the inclusion of the petals within the calyx, while others say that it is from lepro, meaning "scaly", and referring to the scale-like petals.

In 1833, William Jackson Hooker in England described Lepuropetalon from material that a collector had sent from Chile. At about the same time, John Torrey in New York received some material from Louisiana. John Torrey and Asa Gray wrote about Lepuropetalon in 1840. Alvan Wentworth Chapman wrote of it in 1860, 1884, and 1897, in the three editions of Flora of the Southern United States.

Lepuropetalon was mentioned in several other publications in the nineteenth and twentieth centuries, but it remained little known and it was seldom collected for herbaria. There are about 90 known collections of it before 1970. In the 1970s, interest in Lepuropetalon increased and by 1987, when Ward and Gholson wrote of it, there had been 263 collections. Collectors at that time observed that once one learned what sort of areas to look in, Lepuropetalon was easily found. Ward and Gholson provide a detailed map of its distribution in the United States.

== Affinities ==
In the nineteenth and twentieth centuries, Lepuropetalon was placed in various families by different authors, but it was usually placed with Parnassia in Saxifragaceae or segregated with Parnassia to form the family Parnassiaceae. In 1993, a phylogeny of Saxifragaceae was published, based on DNA sequences of the chloroplast gene rbcL, which codes for the large subunit of the carbon dioxide fixing enzyme RuBisCO. This study found Saxifragaceae sensu lato to be polyphyletic with Lepuropetalon, Parnassia, and several others unrelated to the core of the family. Saxifragaceae is now defined much more narrowly than it was in 1993, and now comprises about 30 genera.

As Lepuropetalon and its sister Parnassia were being tossed out of Saxifragales, they were landing in Celastrales. The first very large DNA sequence comparison for flowering plants included both of them and was based on rbcL. The phylogeny produced by this study placed Lepuropetalon and Parnassia together, but only four members of Celastrales were sampled and the authors could not calculate statistical support for their clades.

In 2000, an rbcL phylogeny of eudicots again put Lepuropetalon and Parnassia together, but with only weak statistical support.

In 2001, in a study that used much more DNA, Lepuropetalon again grouped with Parnassia, but with strong statistical support (98% bootstrap percentage). This was confirmed in 2006 in the first study to sample all of the major clades in Celastrales.
