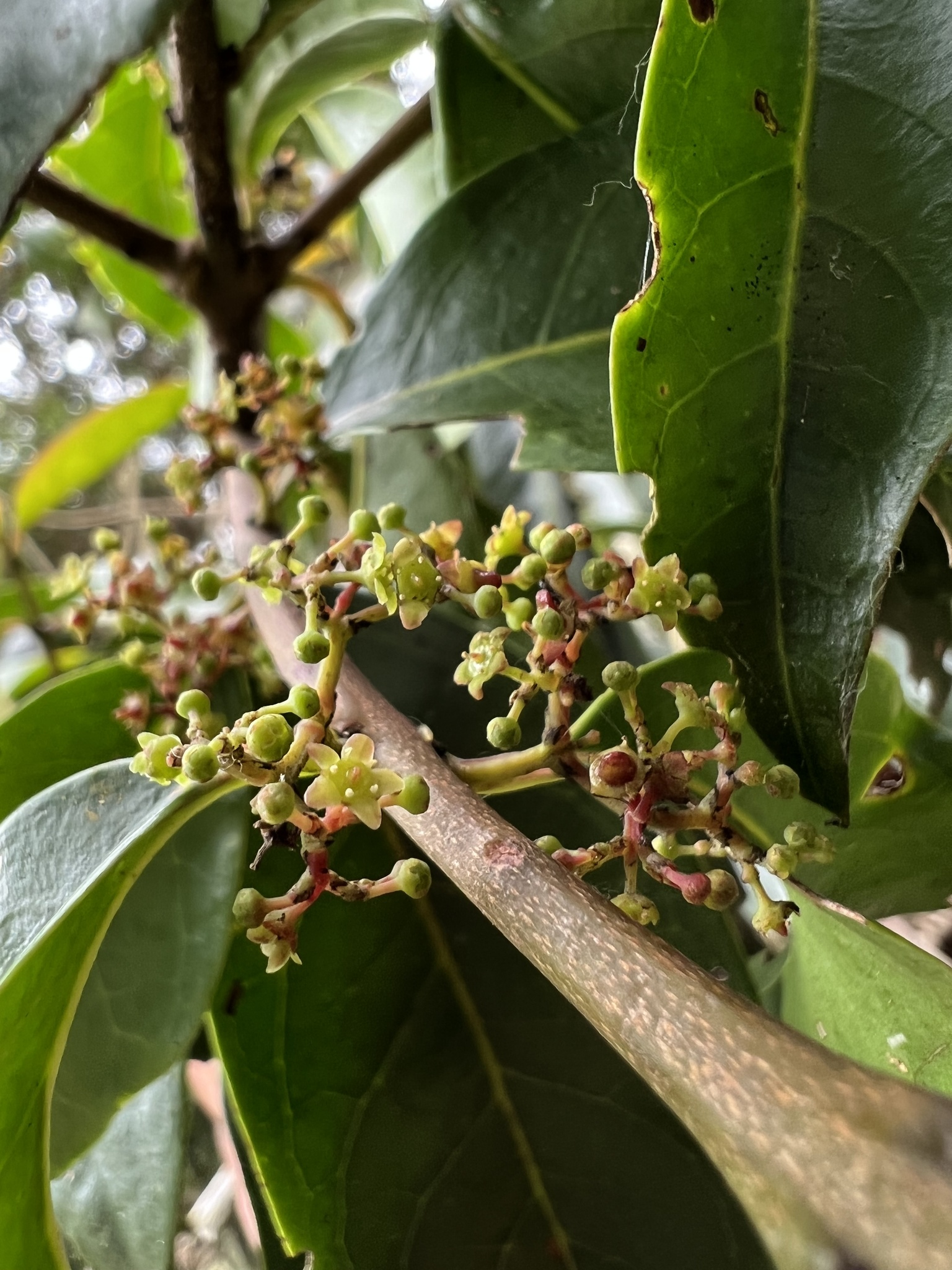
- Zinowiewia australis

Scientific classification
- Kingdom: Plantae
- Clade: Tracheophytes
- Clade: Angiosperms
- Clade: Eudicots
- Clade: Rosids
- Order: Celastrales
- Family: Celastraceae
- Genus: Zinowiewia; Turcz.

Species
- 14; see text

= Zinowiewia =

Genus of flowering plants

Zinowiewia is a genus of flowering plants in the family Celastraceae. It includes 14 species native to the tropical Americas, ranging from northeastern Mexico to French Guiana and Bolivia.

The genus was first published in Bull. Soc. Imp. Naturalistes Moscou 32(I): 275 (1859).

14 species are accepted:

- Zinowiewia australis Lundell
- Zinowiewia aymardii Steyerm.
- Zinowiewia concinna Lundell
- Zinowiewia cuneifolia Lundell
- Zinowiewia integerrima (Turcz.) Turcz.
- Zinowiewia madsenii C.Ulloa & P.M.Jørg.
- Zinowiewia matudae Lundell
- Zinowiewia micrantha Lundell
- Zinowiewia pallida Lundell
- Zinowiewia pauciflora Lundell
- Zinowiewia rubra Lundell
- Zinowiewia sebastianii F.González
- Zinowiewia sulphurea Lundell
- Zinowiewia tacanensis Lundell
