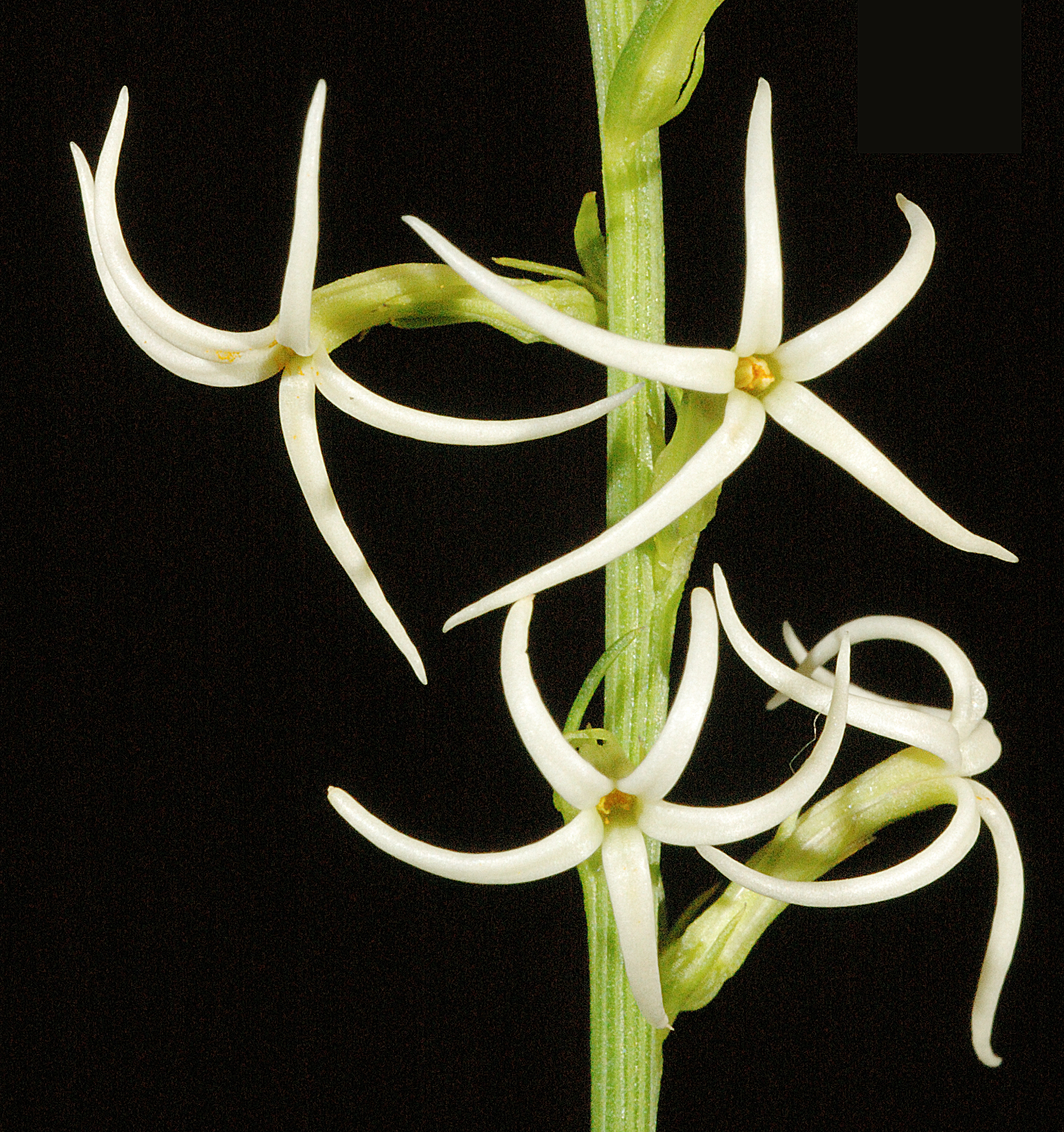

Scientific classification
- Kingdom: Plantae
- Clade: Tracheophytes
- Clade: Angiosperms
- Clade: Eudicots
- Clade: Rosids
- Order: Celastrales
- Family: Celastraceae
- Genus: Tripterococcus; Endl. (1837)
- Species: T. brunonis

Binomial name
- Tripterococcus brunonis Endl. (1837)

Synonyms
- Stackhousia brunonis (Endl.) Benth. (1863); Tripterococcus brachystigma Schuch. (1854); Tripterococcus junceus Bunge (1845); Tripterococcus simplex Bunge (1845)

= Tripterococcus =

Genus of flowering plants

Tripterococcus brunonis is a species of flowering plant belonging to the family Celastraceae. It is a perennial or shrub endemic to Western and Southwest Australia. It is the sole species in genus Tripterococcus.
