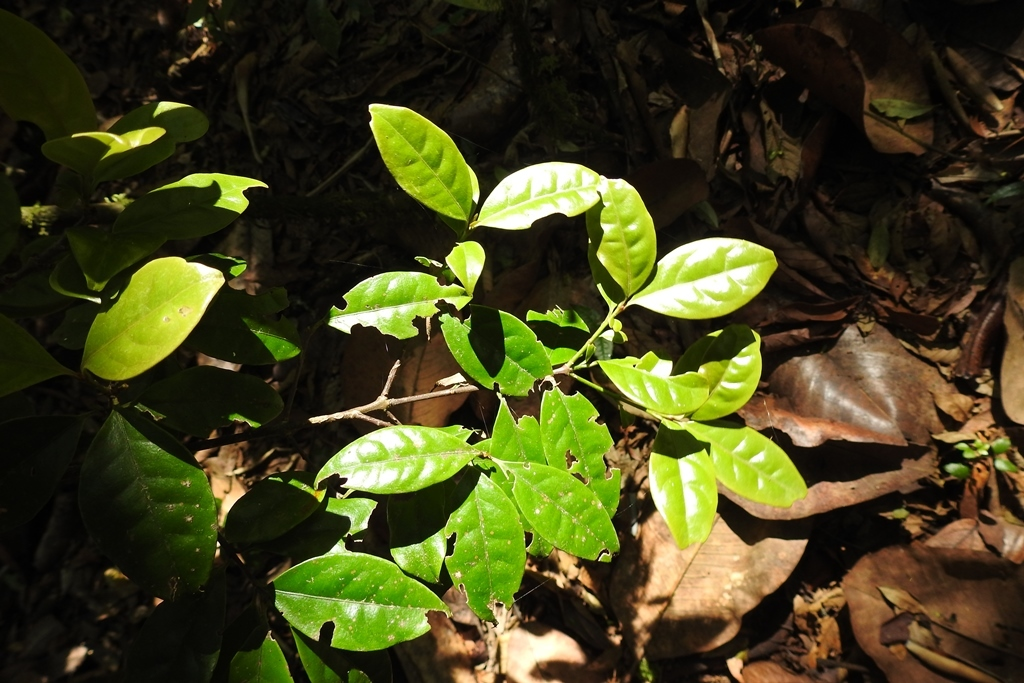
- Quetzalia contracta

Scientific classification
- Kingdom: Plantae
- Clade: Tracheophytes
- Clade: Angiosperms
- Clade: Eudicots
- Clade: Rosids
- Order: Celastrales
- Family: Celastraceae
- Subfamily: Celastroideae
- Genus: Quetzalia; Lundell

Species
- See text

= Quetzalia =

Genus of Celastraceae plants

Quetzalia are a genus of flowering plants in the staff vine and bittersweet family Celastraceae, native to Mexico and Central America. They can be trees, shrubs or lianas. Cyrus Longworth Lundell split them off from Microtropis in 1970, overriding his own 1939 findings.

== Species ==
Eight species are accepted:

- Quetzalia contracta (Lundell) Lundell
- Quetzalia ilicina (Standl. & Steyerm.) Lundell
- Quetzalia mayana (Lundell & L.O.Williams) Lundell
- Quetzalia occidentalis (Loes. ex Donn.Sm.) Lundell
- Quetzalia pauciflora Lundell
- Quetzalia reynae Lundell
- Quetzalia schiedeana (Loes.) Lundell
- Quetzalia stipitata (Lundell) Lundell
