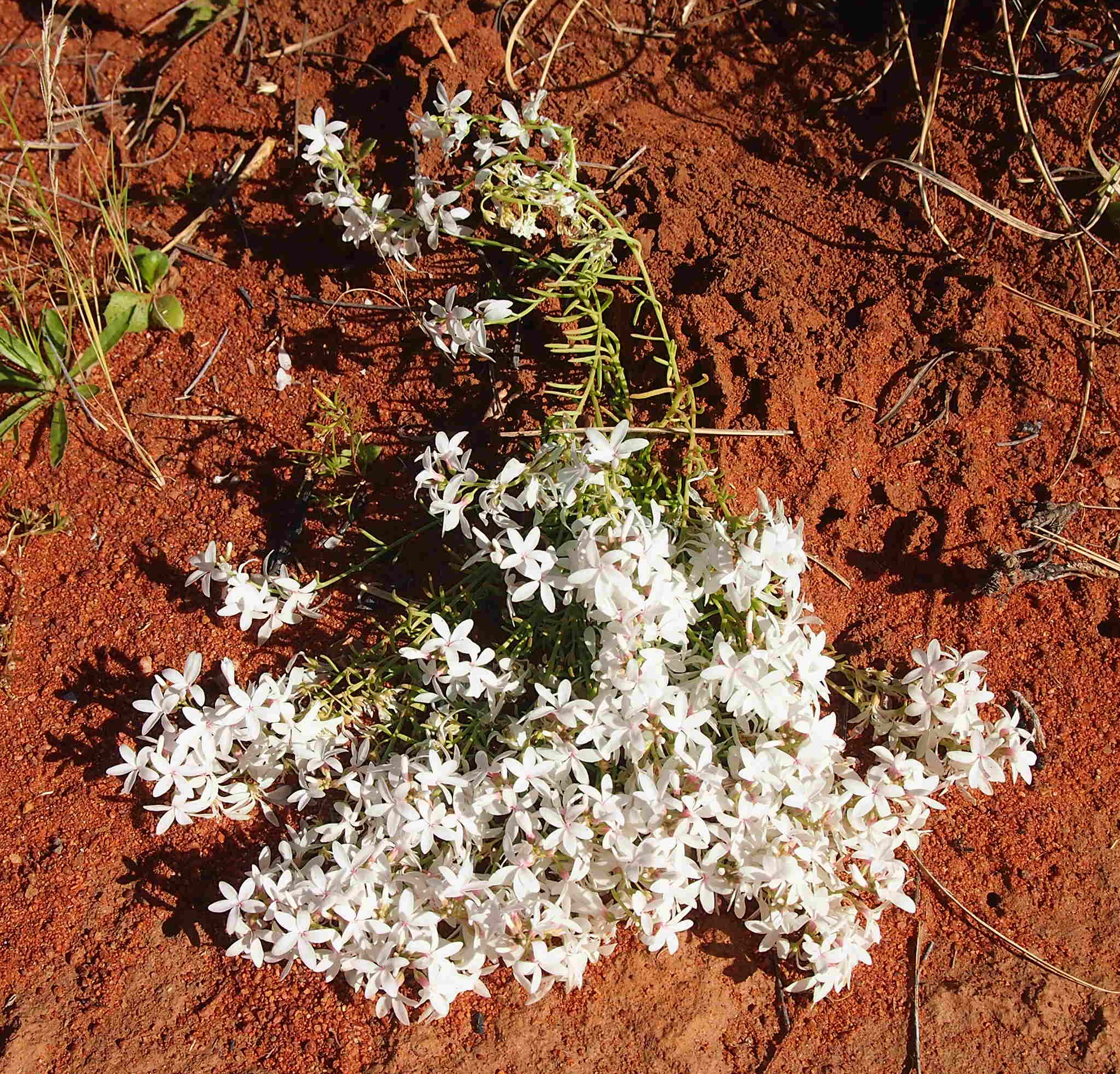

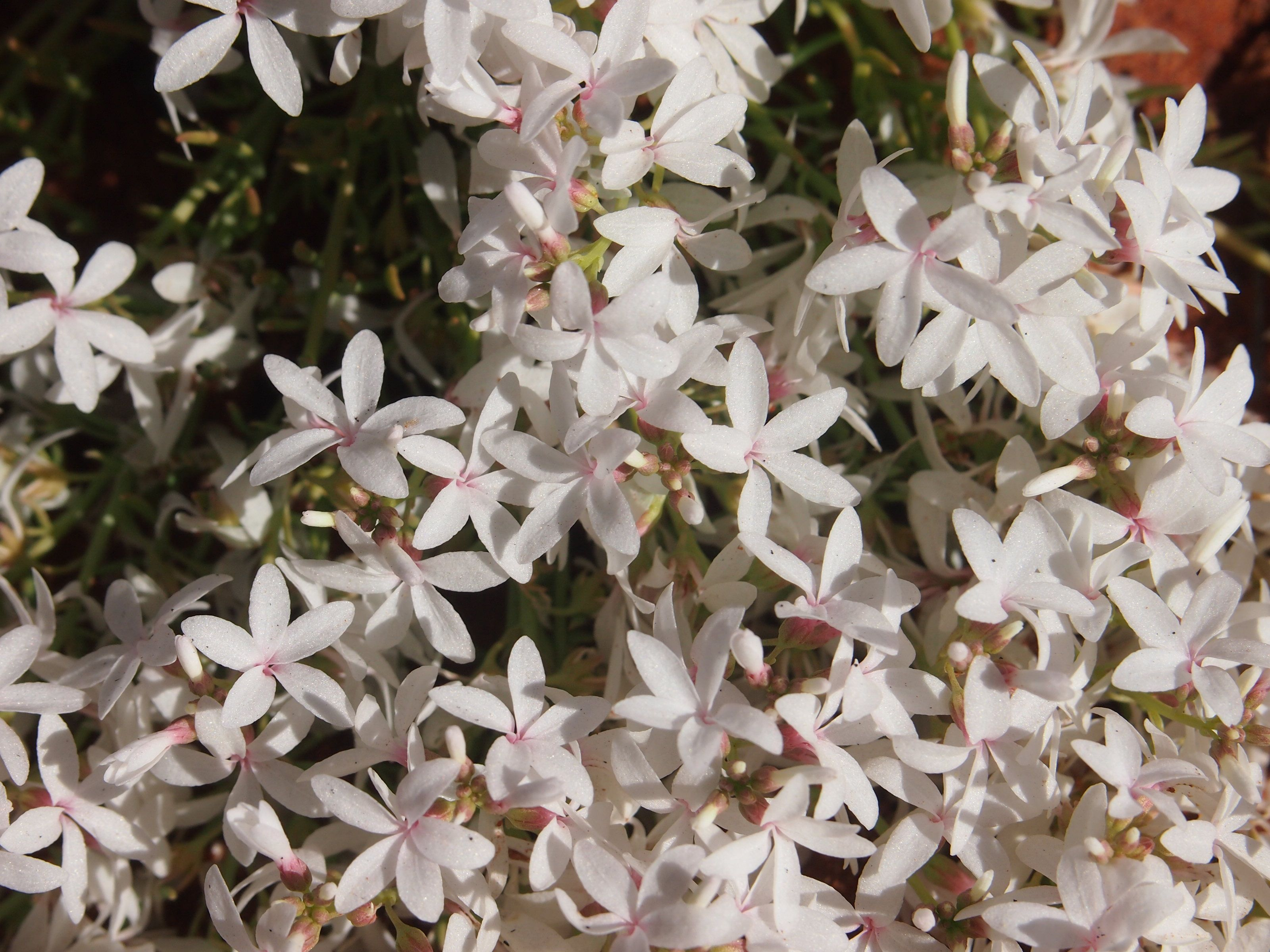

Scientific classification
- Kingdom: Plantae
- Clade: Tracheophytes
- Clade: Angiosperms
- Clade: Eudicots
- Clade: Rosids
- Order: Celastrales
- Family: Celastraceae
- Genus: Macgregoria; F.Muell.
- Species: M. racemigera

Binomial name
- Macgregoria racemigera F.Muell.
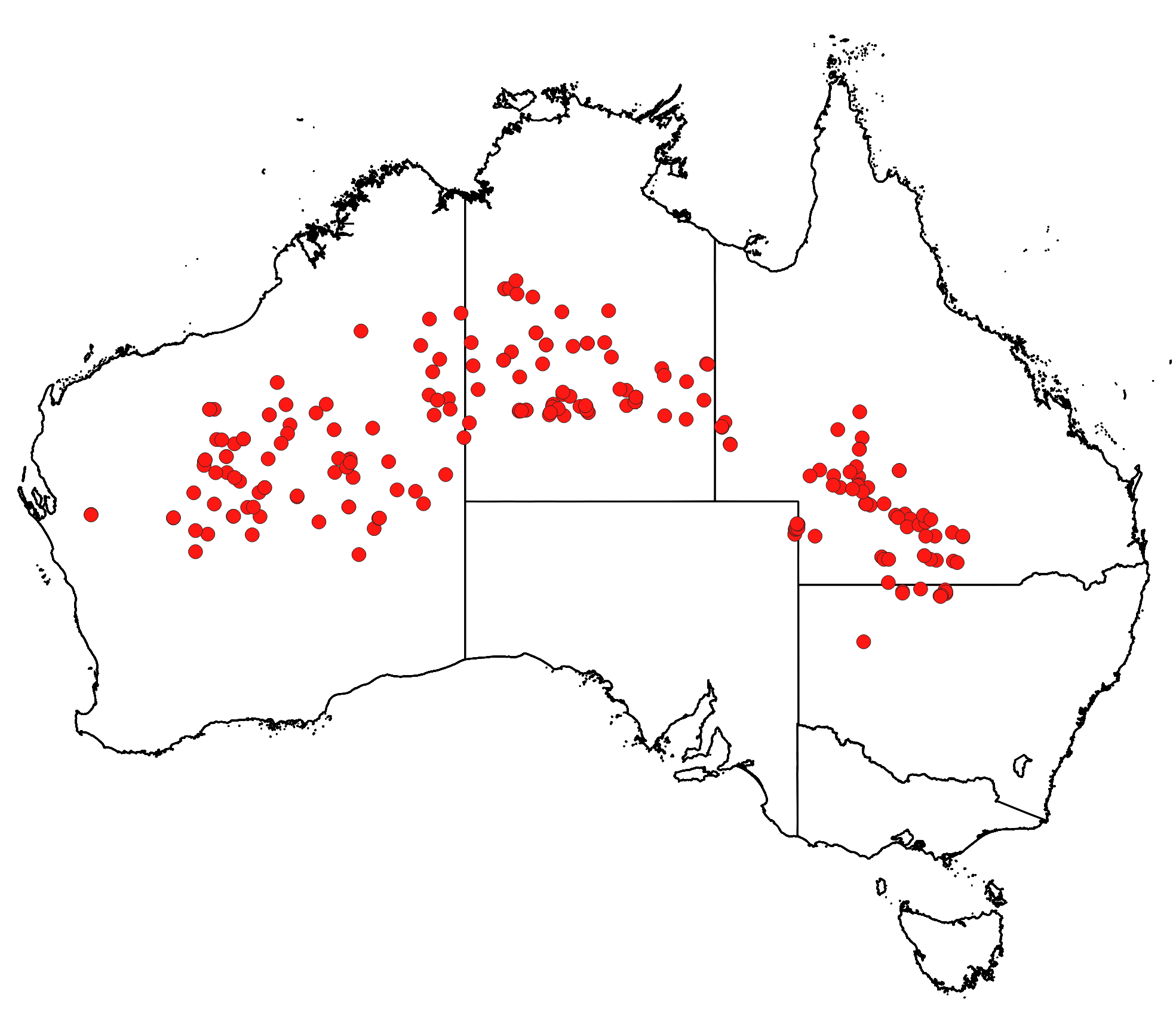
- Occurrence data from AVH

Synonyms
- Macgregoria racemosa Benth.

= Macgregoria racemigera =

Species of flowering plant

Macgregoria racemigera (spinifex snow, desert snow, carpet-of-snow) is a species of flowering plant in the family Celastraceae, and the sole species in genus Macgregoria. It is an annual or perennial native to inland Australia from New South Wales through Queensland, the Northern Territory to Western Australia, and South Australia.

Macgregoria racemigera is an erect annual herb with slender stems spreading over the ground and growing up to 15 cm by 30 cm in diameter. The leaves are linear and 5 to 15 mm long by 1 mm wide. The raceme is dense and from 4 to 11 cm long, with the flowers subtended by a bract at the base of the pedicel. The flowers are white, often having a pink throat and are strongly scented. The five unwinged fruit segments are obovoid, densely papillose, and covered in hooked hairs. The flowers with their lovely perfume are seen in the dry season.

Macgregoria racemigera was first described in 1874 by Ferdinand von Mueller from a specimen collected by Ernest Giles in the MacDonnell Ranges.

== Aboriginal names ==
The Walmajarri people of the southern Kimberley call this plant jaliji (a name given to plants with pretty flowers but having no specific use). The Warlpiri use several names: ngapa-jakajaka, ngapajimpi, ngapa-taraki-taraki.

== Gallery ==
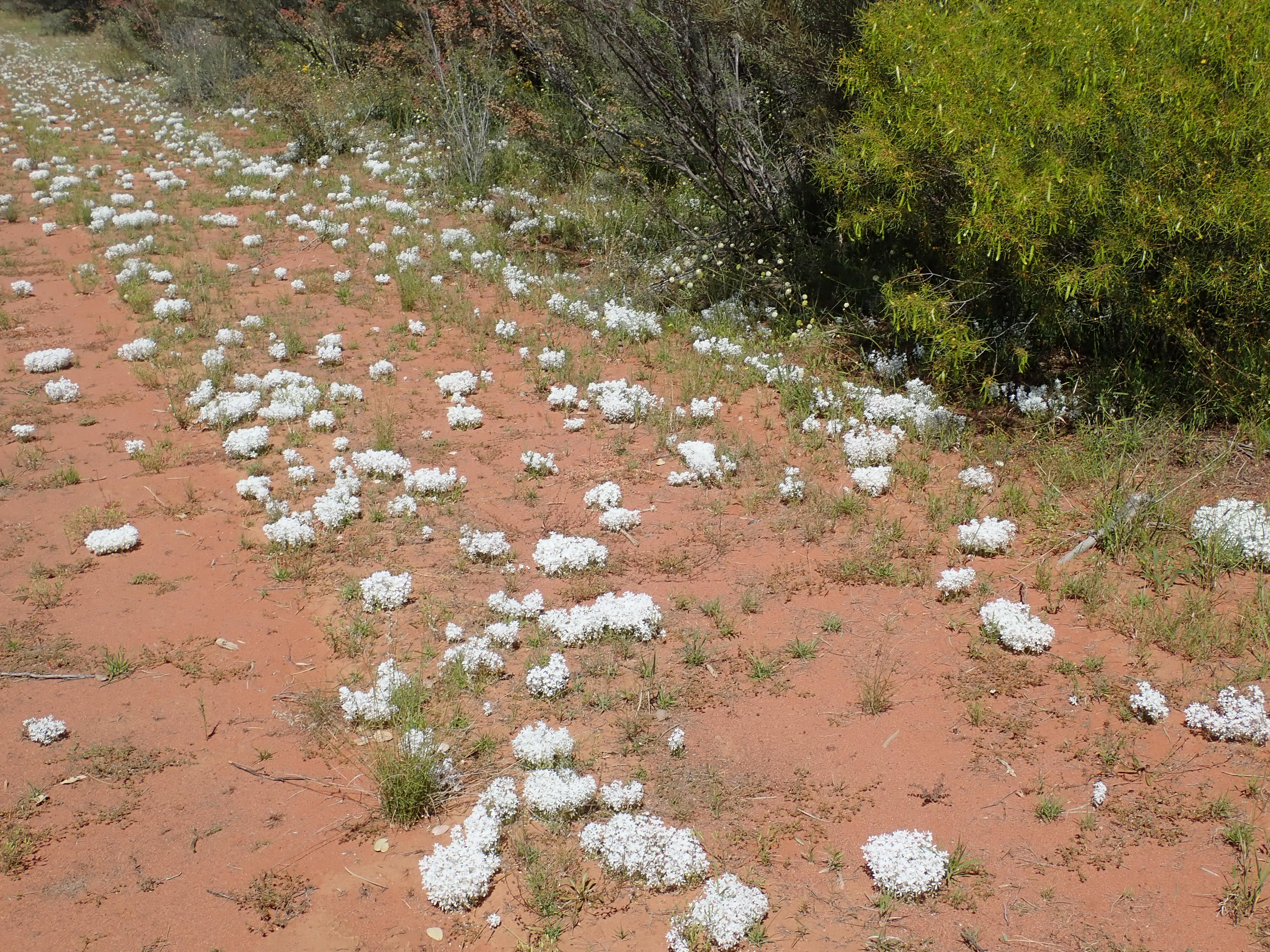
Macgregoria racemigera in Ledknapper Nature Reserve

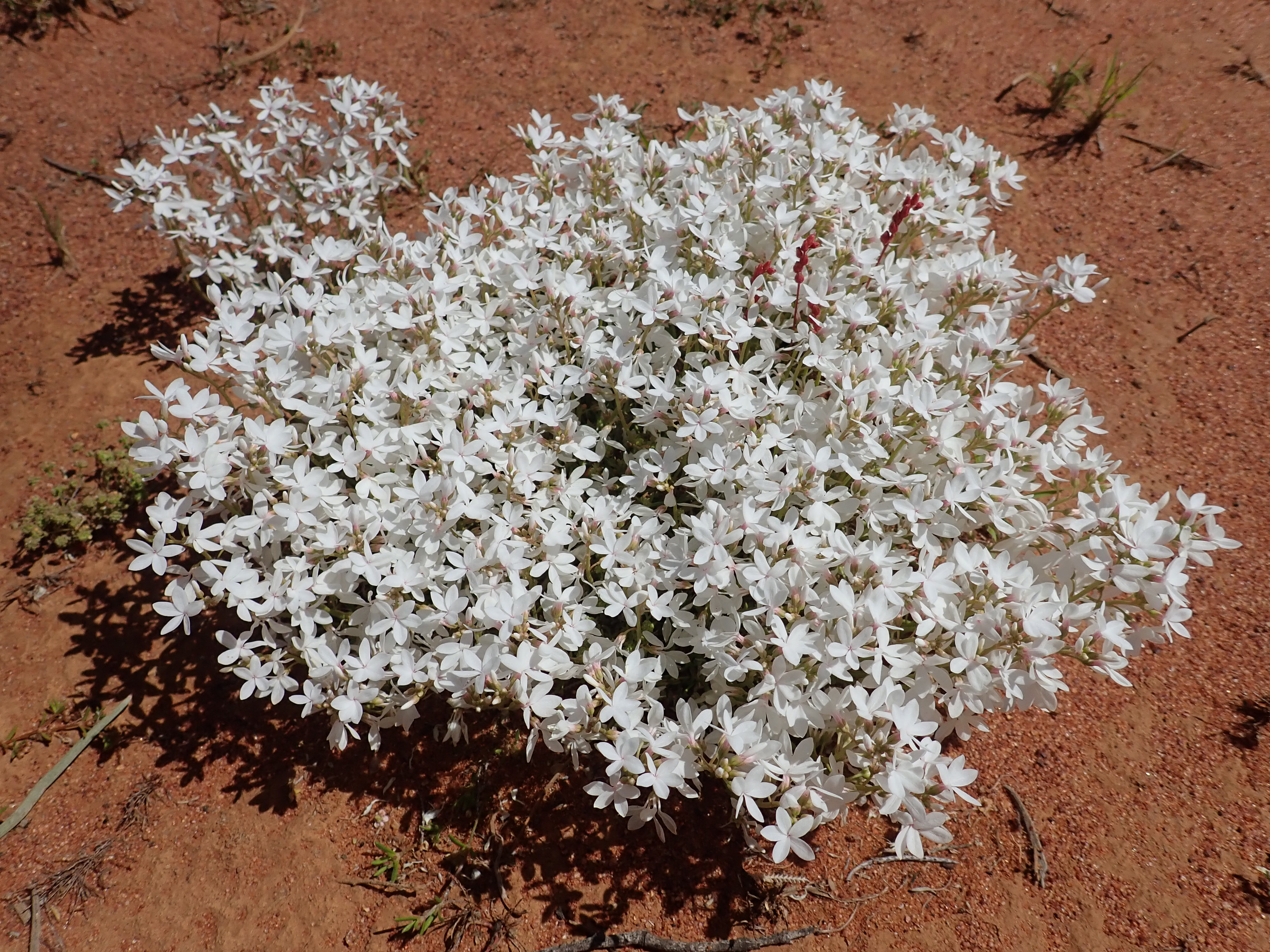
Macgregoria racemigera in Ledknapper Nature Reserve
