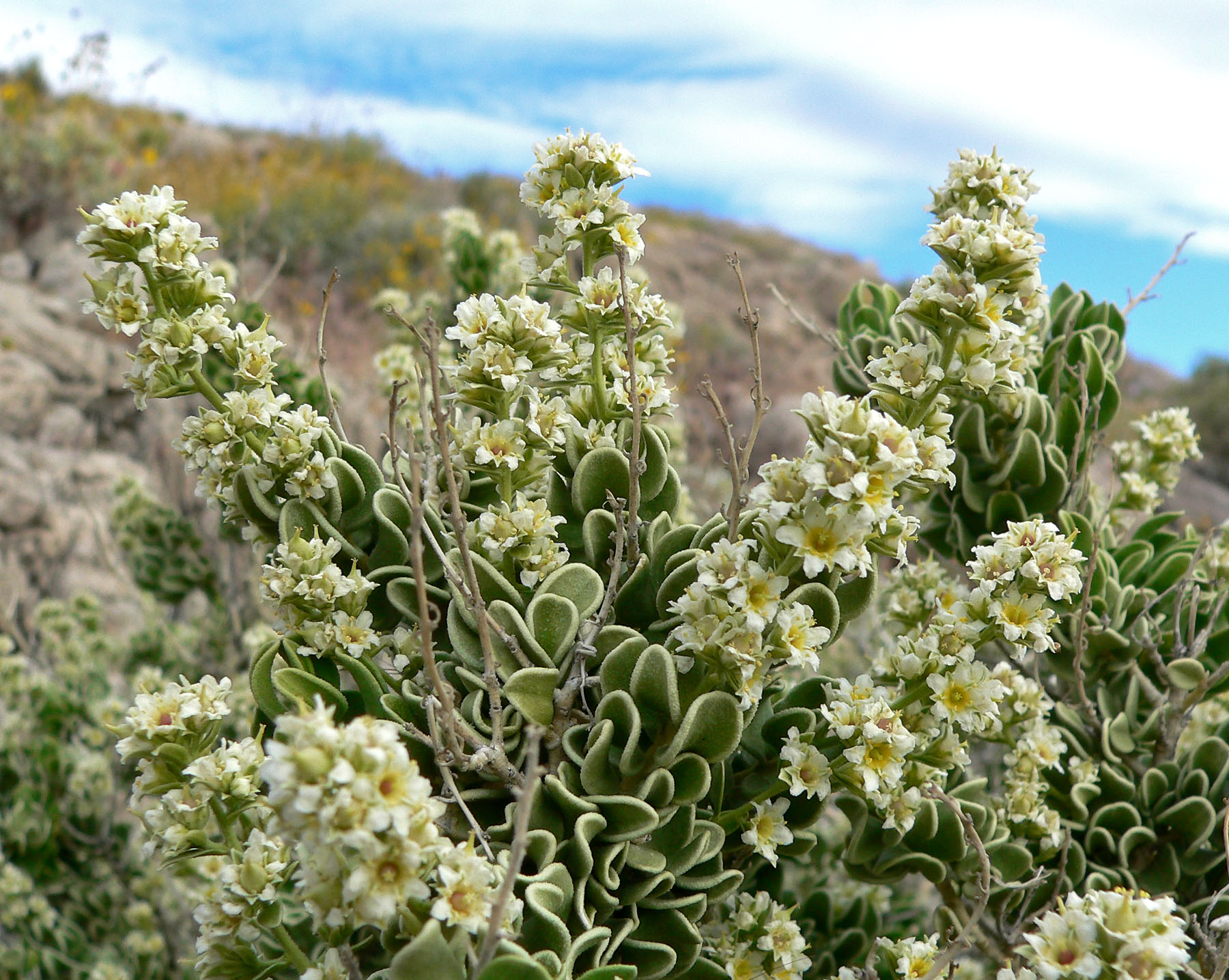
- Mortonia utahensis

Scientific classification
- Kingdom: Plantae
- Clade: Tracheophytes
- Clade: Angiosperms
- Clade: Eudicots
- Clade: Rosids
- Order: Celastrales
- Family: Celastraceae
- Genus: Mortonia; A.Gray

Species
- 7; see text

= Mortonia (plant) =

Genus of shrubs

Mortonia is a small genus of flowering shrubs known as saddlebushes, sand paper bush or mortonias. These are rough, thorny, hairy shrubs with leathery leaves and panicles of fleshy white to purplish flowers. They bear nutlets containing 1 seed each. They are native to the southwestern United States and Mexico, where they are most abundant in dry regions.

Seven species are accepted:

- Mortonia diffusa Rose & Standl.
- Mortonia greggii A.Gray
- Mortonia latisepala I.M.Johnst.
- Mortonia palmeri Hemsl.
- Mortonia scabrella A.Gray
- Mortonia sempervirens A.Gray
- Mortonia utahensis (Coville) A.Nelson
