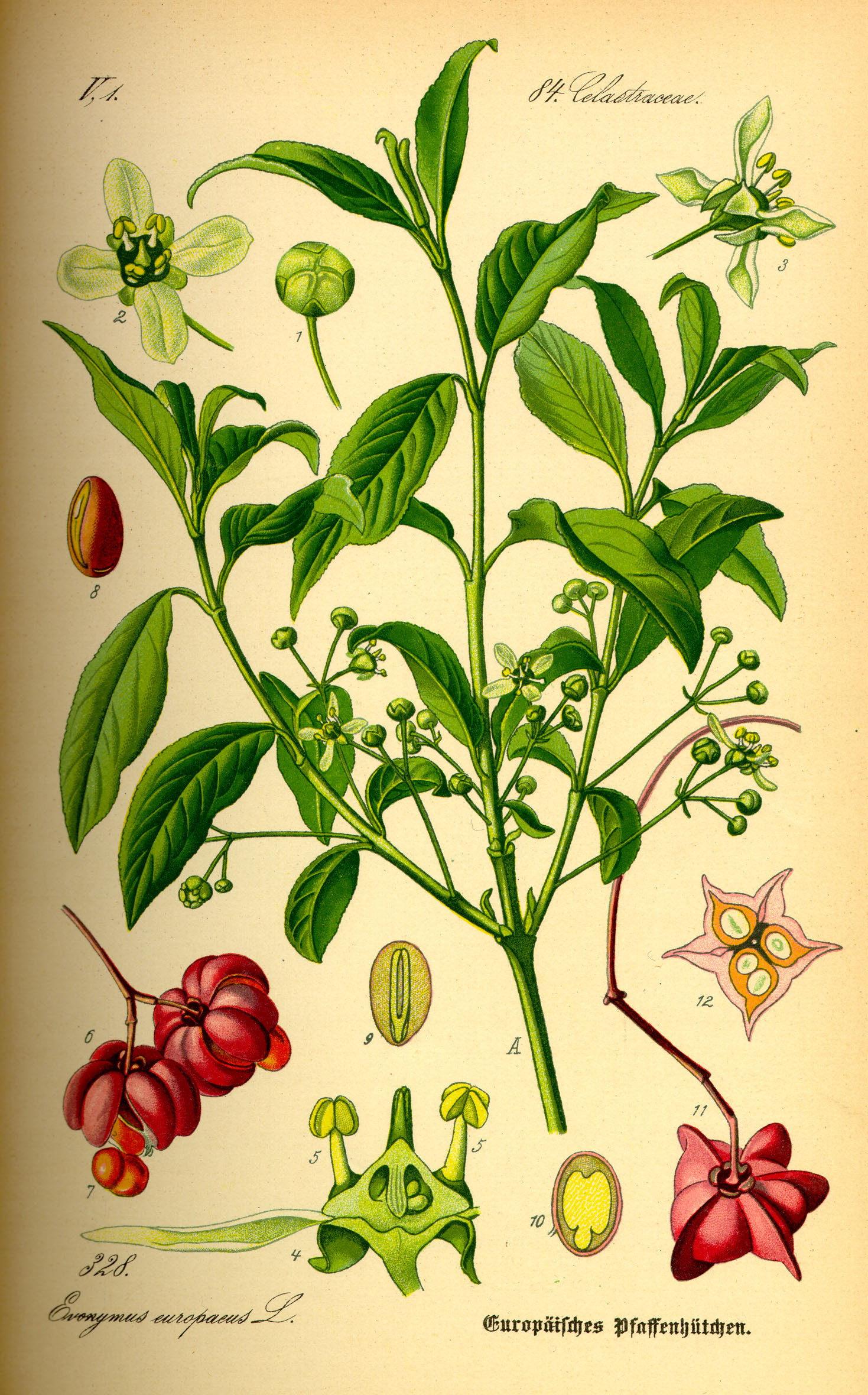
- Euonymus europaea, family Celastraceae

Scientific classification
- Kingdom: Plantae
- Clade: Tracheophytes
- Clade: Angiosperms
- Clade: Eudicots
- Clade: Rosids
- Clade: Fabids
- Order: Celastrales; Link

Families
- Celastraceae; Lepidobotryaceae

= Celastrales =

Order of flowering plants, mostly from tropics and subtropics

The Celastrales are an order of flowering plants found throughout the tropics and subtropics, with only a few species extending far into the temperate regions. The 1200 to 1350 species are in about 100 genera. All but seven of these genera are in the large family Celastraceae. Until recently, the composition of the order and its division into families varied greatly from one author to another.

== Description ==
The Celastrales are a diverse order that has no conspicuous distinguishing characteristic, so is consequently hard to recognize. The flowers are usually small with a conspicuous nectary disk. The stipules are small or rarely absent. The micropyle has two openings and is therefore called a bistomal micropyle. Flowers with well-developed male and female parts are often functionally unisexual. The seed often has an aril. In bud, the sepals have a quincuncial arrangement. This means that two sepals are inside, two are outside, and the remaining sepal is half inside and half outside.

== Relationships ==
Perhaps the most conspicuous and unusual trait of the Celastrales is the nectary disk, a feature that it shares with another rosid order, Sapindales. Since the orders are not closely related, the disk must have been an independent development in each of these lines.

The Celastrales are a member of the Celastrales, Oxalidales (including Huaceae), and Malpighiales (COM) clade of Fabidae, with Fabidae being one of the two groups of Eurosids.

== Circumscription ==
The name Celastrales was first used by Thomas Baskerville in 1839. In the time since Baskerville first defined the order, until the 21st century, great differences of opinion occurred about what should be included in the order and in its largest family, the Celastraceae. The family Celastraceae was the only group consistently placed in the order by all authors who accepted it. Because of the ambiguity and complexity of its definition, the Celastraceae became a dumping ground for genera of dubious affinity. Several genera were assigned to this family with considerable doubt about whether they really belonged there. Also, some genera that properly belong in the Celastraceae were placed elsewhere.

By the end of the 20th century, Goupia and Forsellesia had been excluded from the Celastraceae and also from the Celastrales. Goupia is now in the Malpighiales. Forsellesia is now in the Crossosomatales. It continues to be the subject of a dispute about whether its proper name is Forsellesia or Glossopetalon.

After being placed elsewhere, Canotia, Brexia, and Plagiopteron were found to belong in the Celastraceae. The family Hippocrateaceae was found to be deeply nested within the Celastraceae and is no longer recognized as a separate family.

In 2000, Vincent Savolainen et alii found that three families - Lepidobotryaceae, Parnassiaceae, and Celastraceae - were closely related. They stated that these three families should constitute the order Celastrales, and this idea was accepted by the Angiosperm Phylogeny Group, which later subsumed the Parnassiaceae into the Celastraceae. Savolainen and co-authors also excluded Lophopyxis from the Celastrales. Lophopyxis now constitutes a monogeneric family in the Malpighiales.

In 2001, in a molecular phylogenetic study of DNA sequences, Mark Simmons and others confirmed all of these results except for the placement of Lophopyxis and the Lepidobotryaceae, which they did not sample.

In 2006, Li-Bing Zhang and Mark Simmons produced a phylogeny of the Celastrales based on nuclear ribosomal, and chloroplast DNA. Their results showed that Bhesa and Perrottetia were misplaced in the Celastraceae. Bhesa is now in the Centroplacaceae, a family in the Malpighiales. and Perrottetia is in the Huerteales. Zhang and Simmons found Pottingeria and Mortonia to be closely related to the families Parnassiaceae and Celastraceae, as they were then defined, but not in either of them. These two genera are therefore in the Celastrales. They found that Siphonodon and Empleuridium are proper members of the Celastraceae, removing considerable doubt about their placement there. They also showed that the small family Stackhousiaceae, consisting of three genera, is embedded in the Celastraceae. Except for taxa that were not sampled, these results were confirmed by the second phylogeny of the Celastrales, which was produced by Mark Simmons and several co-authors in 2008.

Nicobariodendron sleumeri, the only member of its genus, continues to be an enigma. It is a small tree from the Andaman and Nicobar Islands of India. Little is known of it and it has never been sampled for DNA. It is generally thought to belong in the Celastrales, but this is not a certainty. It is one of the five taxa placed incertae sedis in the angiosperms in the APG III system of classification.

== Families ==
The Celastrales have been divided into families in various ways. In their APG II classification in 2003, the Angiosperm Phylogeny Group recognized three families in the Celastrales – Lepidobotryaceae, Parnassiaceae, and Celastraceae. When they revised their classification in 2009, they recognized only two families because Pottingeria and the two genera of Parnassiaceae were transferred to the Celastraceae. Nicobariodendron became one of the five taxa placed incertae sedis in the angiosperms.

In the 2006 phylogeny, Nicobariodendron was not sampled, but those species that were sampled fell into two strongly supported clades. One was a small clade consisting only of the family Lepidobotryaceae. Its sister was a very large clade containing the rest of the order. The large clade consisted of five strongly supported groups. These are the family Parnassiaceae, the genus Pottingeria, the genus Mortonia (in the Celastraceae), and a pair of genera from the Celastraceae (Quetzalia and Zinowiewia), and the rest of the Celastraceae. No relationships were resolved among these groups.

In 2008, Simmons and others produced a phylogeny of the Celastrales that achieved better resolution than the 2006 study by sampling more species and more DNA. They found the same pentatomy of five strongly supported groups that the previous study had found, but only weak to moderate support for any relationships between the five groups. In the APG III system, the family Celastraceae was expanded to consist of these five groups. No one has yet published an intrafamilial classification for the expanded Celastraceae.

== Phylogeny ==
The following phylogenetic tree was made by combining parts of three different trees. Bootstrap support is 100% except where shown. Branches with less than 50% bootstrap support are collapsed. The clade numbers are from Simmons et al. (2008).

- Celastrales
  - Lepidobotryaceae
    - Lepidobotrys
    - Ruptiliocarpon
  - - - Lepuropetalon
      - Parnassia
    - 68
      - Pottingeria
      - Mortonia
    - 56
      - - Quetzalia
        - Zinowiewia
      - - CLADE 1
          - - Peripterygia
            - Siphonodon
          - 80
            - Dicarpellum
            - - Tripterococcus
              - - Macgregoria
                - Stackhousia
            - - Menepetalum
              - Psammomoya
            - Denhamia
        - 87
          - CLADE 2
            - Maytenus
            - 53
              - Gyminda
              - 89
                - - Tripterygium
                  - Celastrus
                - 99
                  - Paxistima
                  - Crossopetalum
                  - Canotia
                  - Euonymus
          - CLADE 3 89
            - CLADE 4
              - Empleuridium
              - 72
                - Pterocelastrus
                - 69
                  - Mystroxylon
                  - Robsonodendron
            - CLADE 5 50
              - Salaciopsis
              - CLADE 6
                - 96
                  - Catha
                  - - Hartogiella
                    - - Cassine
                      - Maurocenia
                - 98
                  - Lydenburgia
                  - Gymnosporia
              - CLADE 7
                - - - Polycardia
                    - Brexia
                  - - Pleurostylia
                    - - Elaeodendron
                      - Pseudocatha
                - Kokoona
                - - - Lophopetalon
                    - - Salacia
                      - Tontelea
                  - - Plagiopteron
                    - Hippocratea
                    - Pristimera
                    - Loeseneriella
