= Crucifixion thorn =

Crucifixion thorn may refer to one of the following North American desert plants:

- Canotia holacantha, a shrub or small tree in the family Celastraceae native to the Mojave and Sonoran Deserts
- Castela emoryi, a shrub or small tree in the family Simaroubaceae native to the Mojave and Sonoran Deserts
  - Crucifixion Thorn Natural Area, a part of the Yuha Desert named after castela emoryi
- Castela erecta (goatbush), a shrub or small tree in the family Simaroubaceae native to the Chihuahuan Desert
- Colletia cruciata
- Holacantha stewartii (Stewart crucifixion-thorn), a shrub or small tree in the family Simaroubaceae native to the Chihuahuan Desert
- Koeberlinia spinosa (allthorn), a shrub or small tree in the family Koeberliniaceae native to the Sonoran Desert
