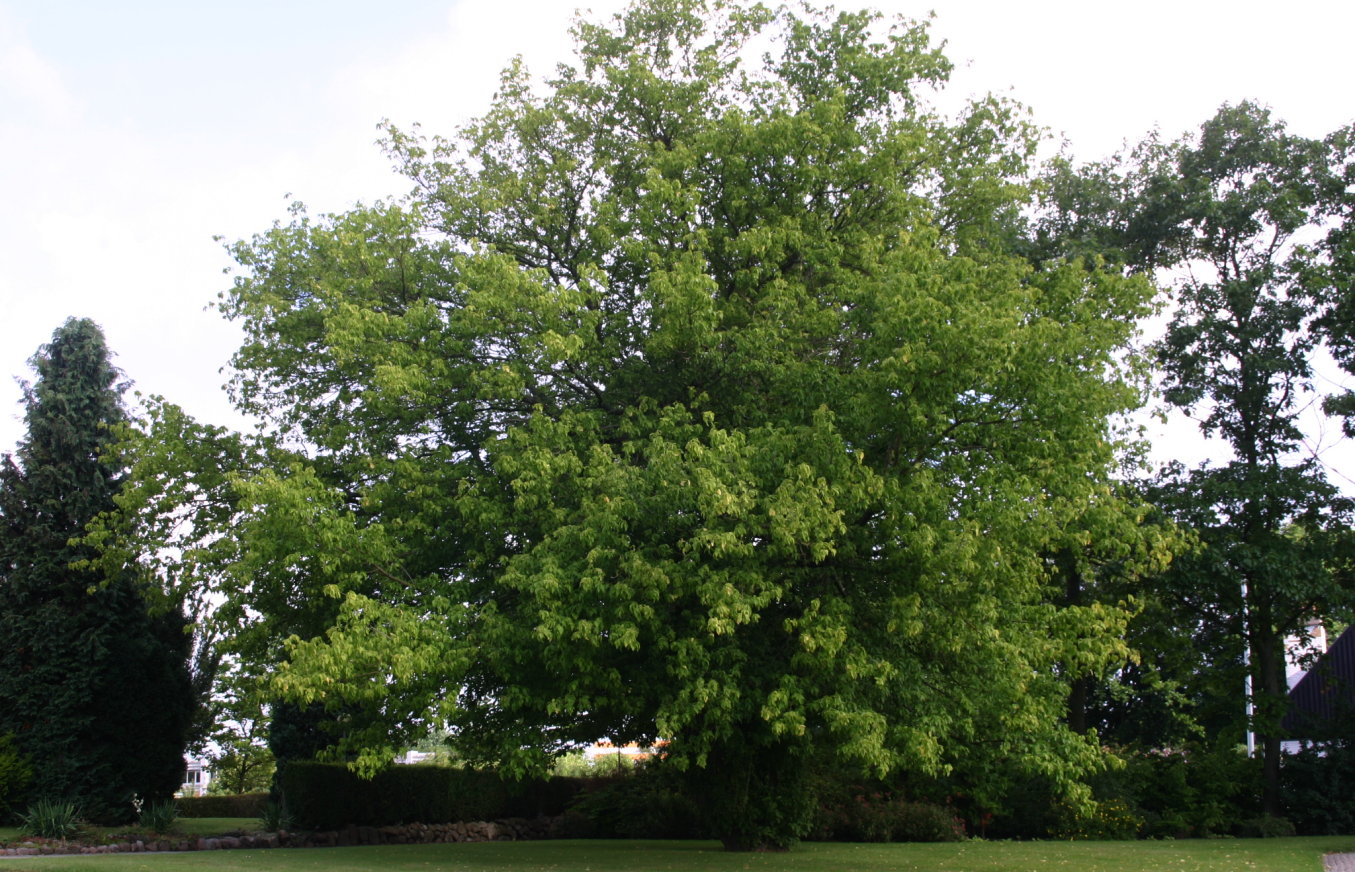
- Manitoba Maple (Acer negundo)

Scientific classification
- Kingdom: Plantae
- Clade: Embryophytes
- Clade: Tracheophytes
- Clade: Angiosperms
- Clade: Eudicots
- Clade: Rosids
- Clade: Malvids
- Order: Sapindales; Dumortier

Families
- See text

= Sapindales =

Order of flowering plants

Sapindales /sæpɪnˈdeɪliːz/ is an order of flowering plants that diversified in the mid-Cretaceous. Well-known members of Sapindales include citrus; maples, sumac, horse-chestnuts, lychees and rambutans; mangos and cashews; frankincense and myrrh; mahogany neem and also pistachio.

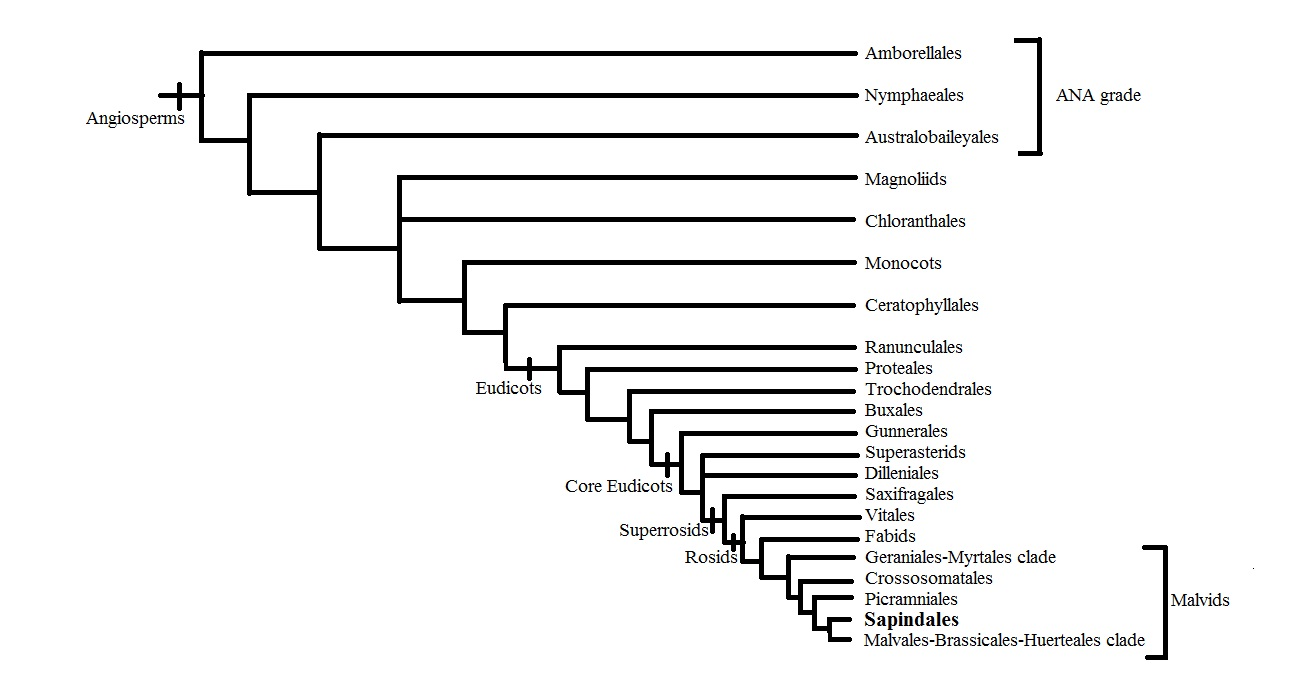
External phylogeny of the Sapindales based on the Angiosperm Phylogeny Group IV system (2016)

The APG III system of 2009 includes it in the clade malvids (in rosids, in eudicots) with the following nine families:

- Anacardiaceae
- Biebersteiniaceae
- Burseraceae
- Kirkiaceae
- Meliaceae
- Nitrariaceae (including Peganaceae and Tetradiclidaceae)
- Rutaceae
- Sapindaceae
- Simaroubaceae

The APG II system of 2003 allowed the optional segregation of families now included in the Nitrariaceae.

In the classification system of Dahlgren the Rutaceae were placed in the order Rutales, in the superorder Rutiflorae (also called Rutanae). The Cronquist system of 1981 used a somewhat different circumscription, including the following families:

- Staphyleaceae
- Melianthaceae
- Bretschneideraceae
- Akaniaceae
- Sapindaceae
- Hippocastanaceae
- Aceraceae
- Burseraceae
- Anacardiaceae
- Julianiaceae
- Simaroubaceae
- Cneoraceae
- Meliaceae
- Rutaceae
- Zygophyllaceae

The difference from the APG III system is not as large as may appear, as the plants in the families Aceraceae and Hippocastanaceae stay in this order at APG III (both included in family Sapindaceae). The species now composing the family Nitrariaceae in APG III also belonged to this order in the Cronquist system as part of the family Zygophyllaceae, while those now in the family Kirkiaceae were present as part of the family Simaroubaceae.

== Bibliography ==
- Pell, Susan Katherine (May 2004). Molecular systematics of the cashew family (Anacardiaceae) (PDF). Department of Biological Sciences, Louisiana State University. Archived from the original (PhD thesis) on 2008-08-21.
