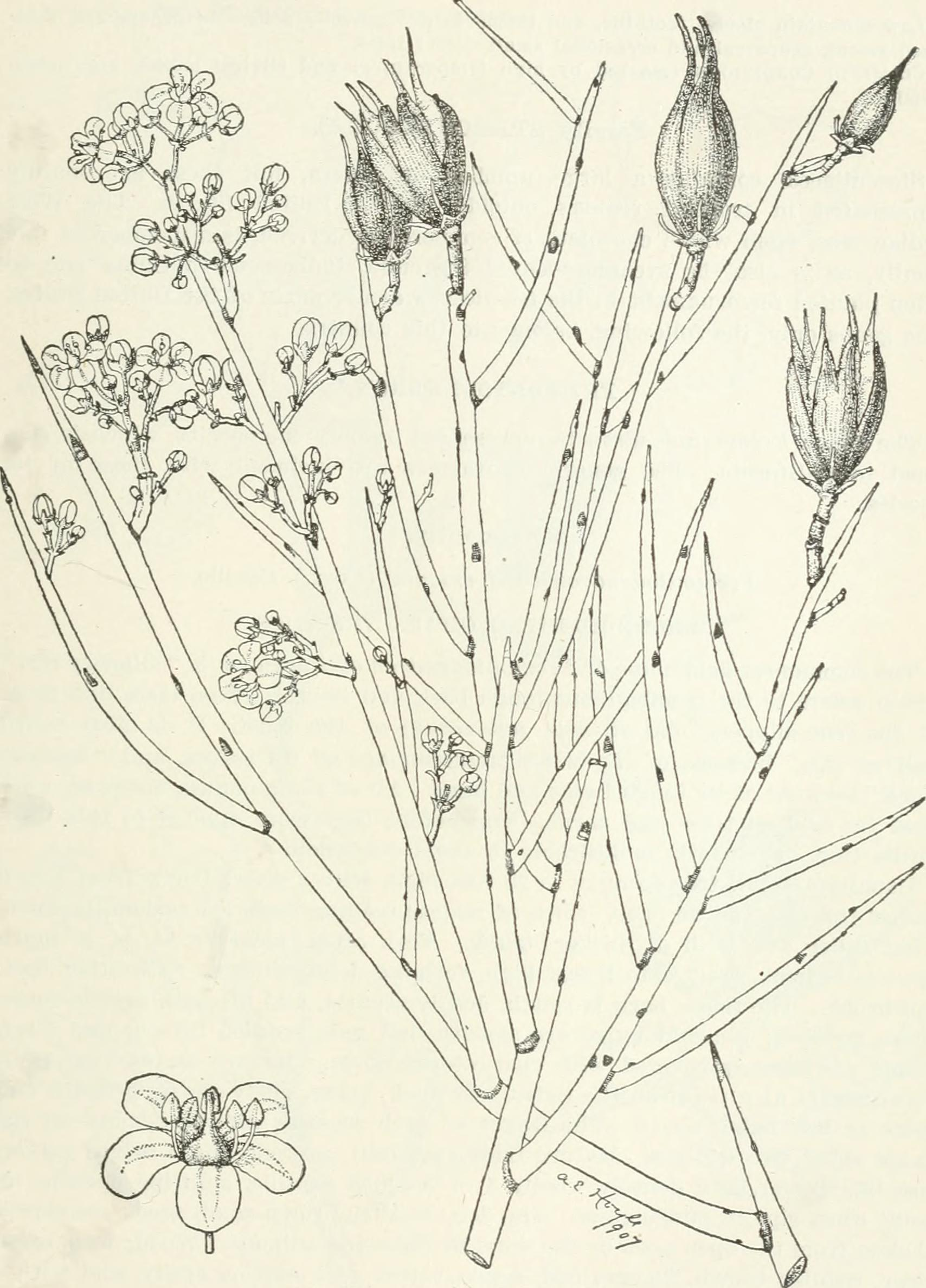
- illustration from Forest Trees of the Pacific Slope

Conservation status
- Secure (NatureServe)

Scientific classification
- Kingdom: Plantae
- Clade: Tracheophytes
- Clade: Angiosperms
- Clade: Eudicots
- Clade: Rosids
- Order: Celastrales
- Family: Celastraceae
- Genus: Canotia
- Species: C. holacantha

Binomial name
- Canotia holacantha Torr.
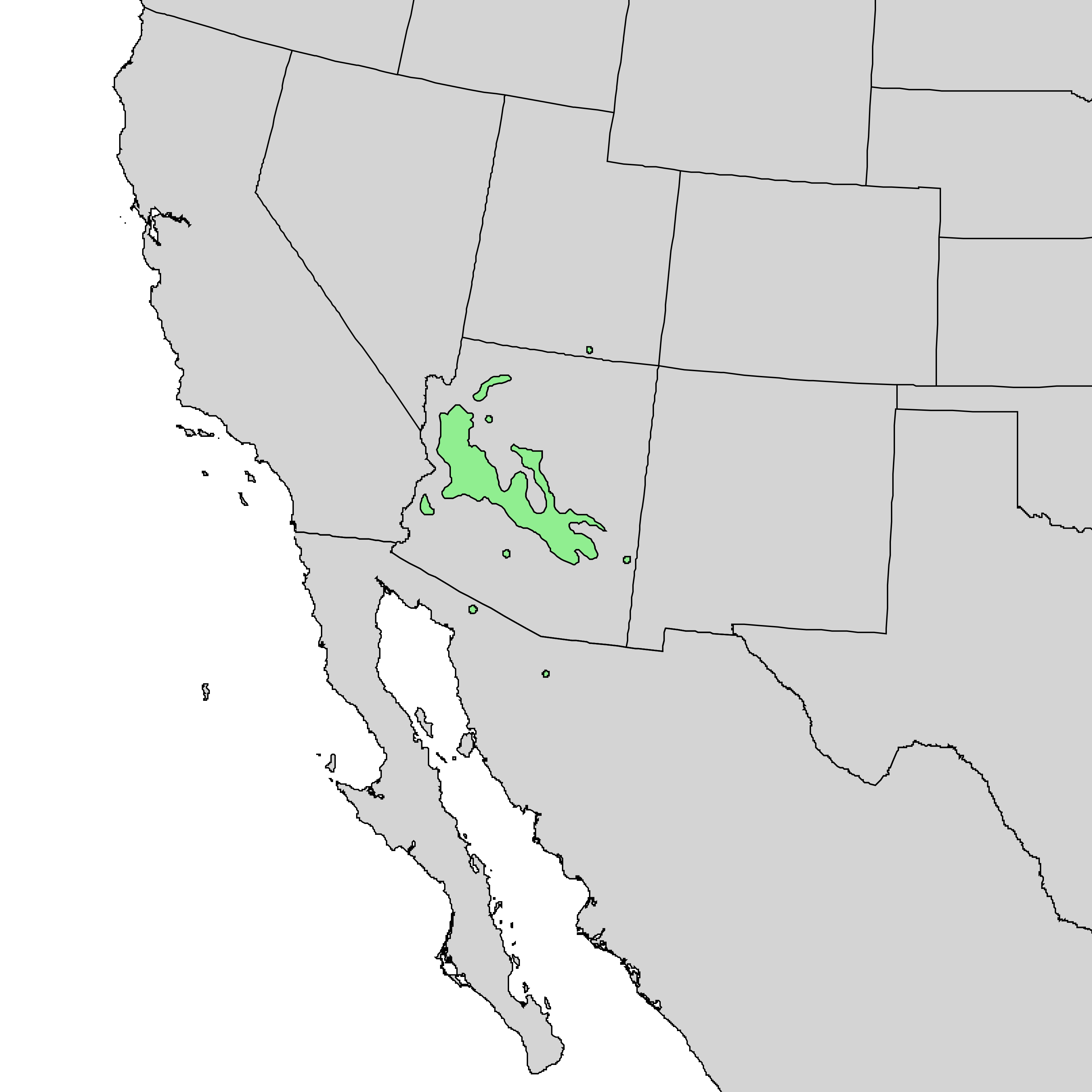
- Natural range of Canotia holacantha

= Canotia holacantha =

Genus of flowering plants

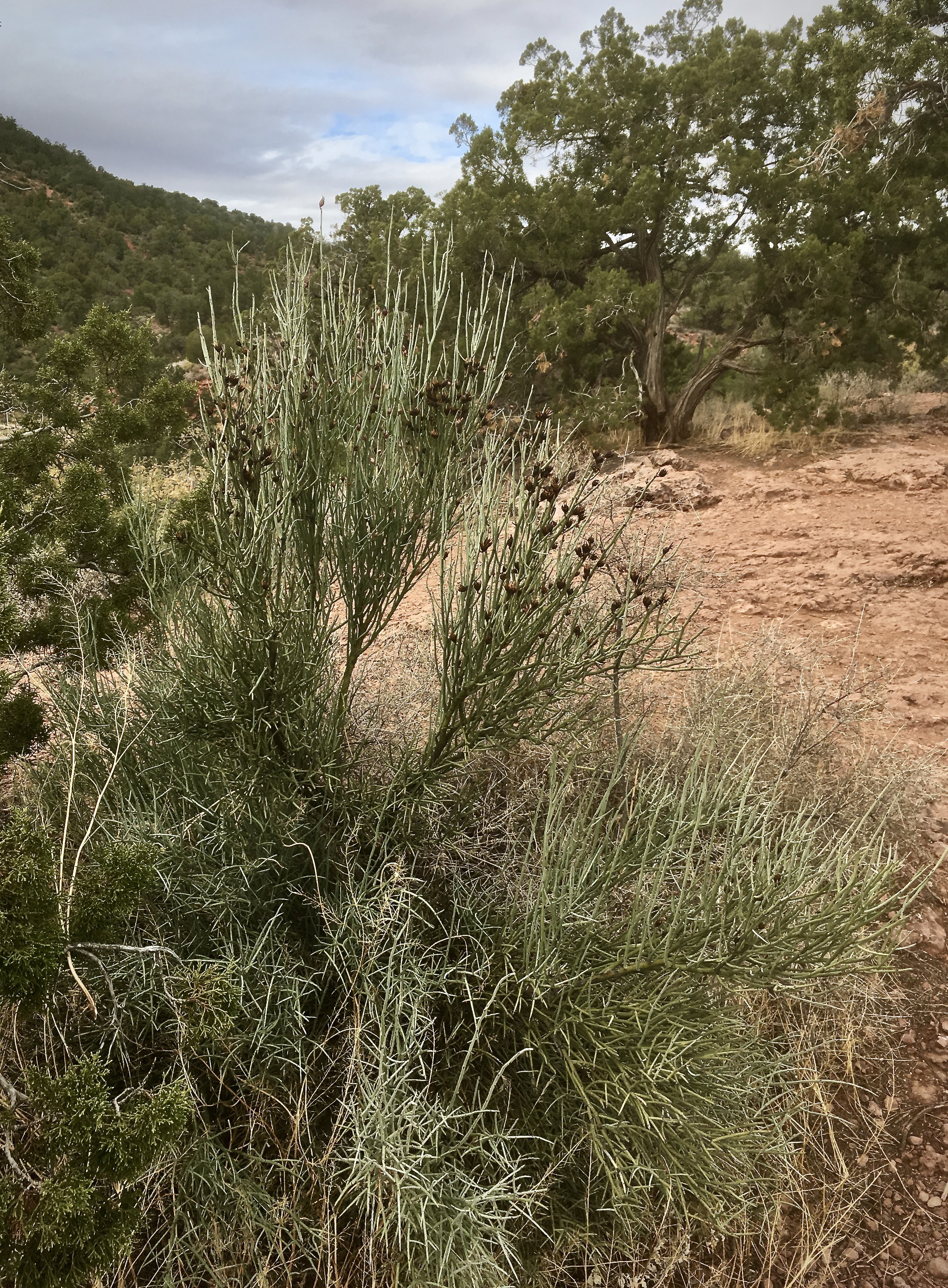
Canotia aka Crucifixion thorn, Upper Red Rock road, Sedona area. Many of the Central Arizona Canotias are within the Pinyon-juniper woodlands.

Canotia holacantha, also known as crucifixion thorn or simply canotia, is a flowering shrub / small tree in the family Celastraceae.

== Distribution ==
The plant is native to the higher elevation deserts of the Southwestern United States in Arizona and southeastern California, and of Northwest Mexico in isolated locales in Baja California and Sonora).

Canotia grows in desert scrub environments, primarily on slopes or in washes. It is found in the higher Sonoran Desert across central Arizona, reaching to the Mojave Desert of California and northwest Arizona, and into the lower reaches of the Grand Canyon.

=== Prehistory ===
The prehistoric distribution of Canotia holacantha has been analyzed with pollen records in certain locations. One of the most detailed studies has been conducted in the Waterman Mountains of Arizona, where C. holacantha has been documented to have occurred during the Late Wisconsin glacial period, along with dominant trees Juniperus osteosperma and Pinus monophylla.

== Description ==
Canotia holacantha reaches a height of 10–15 feet (3.0–4.6 m). However, one specimen located in the eastern Mojave Desert near Wikieup, Arizona is known to exceed 30 feet (9.1 m) in height. It is usually a scrubby species, with gray-green branches tipped with sharp thorns.

This species handles photosynthesis with its twigs, rather than the short-lived leaves, like the unrelated Foothill palo verde (Parkinsonia microphylla) which it closely resembles. Its leaves are insignificant scales which are quickly shed and rarely seen; more easily seen are its seed pods, which are persistent clusters of reddish-brown seed capsules which hang in groups of five.

== Vernacular names ==
Other common names for this species include chaparro amargosa, corona-de-cristo, and rosario; all such names are in reference to its thorny twigs, which are likened to the Crown of Thorns. The name "crucifixion thorn" is also applied to several unrelated species, some of which canotia shares its range with, including Castela emoryi in the family Simaroubaceae and Koeberlinia spinosa (allthorn) in the family Koeberliniaceae.

The World War II Ailanthus-class net laying ship USS Canotia was named after this tree.

Canotia is grown in cultivation by seeds.
