= Batis argillicola =

Scientific classification
- Kingdom: Plantae
- Clade: Tracheophytes
- Clade: Angiosperms
- Clade: Eudicots
- Clade: Rosids
- Order: Brassicales
- Family: Bataceae
- Genus: Batis
- Species: B. argillicola

Binomial name
- Batis argillicola P.Royen

Species of plant

Batis argillicola is a species of flowering plant in the family Bataceae, native to southern New Guinea and northern Australia. It is a monoecious succulent shrub from 20 to 70 cm (8 to 28 in) tall, typically found in tidal flats and clay pans.
