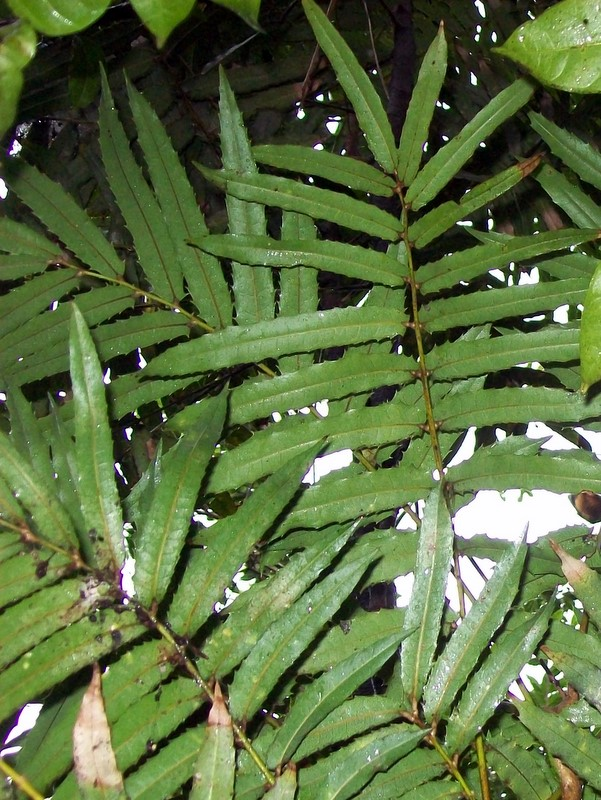
- Akania bidwillii - leaves

Scientific classification
- Kingdom: Plantae
- Clade: Tracheophytes
- Clade: Angiosperms
- Clade: Eudicots
- Clade: Rosids
- Order: Brassicales
- Family: Akaniaceae
- Genus: Akania; Hook.f.
- Species: A. bidwillii

Binomial name
- Akania bidwillii (R.Hogg) Mabb.

Synonyms
- Lomatia bidwillii Hend. ex R.Hogg; Akania lucens (F.Muell.) Airy Shaw; Akania hillii Hook.f. Cupania lucens F.Muell.

= Akania bidwillii =

Species of flowering plant

Akania is a monotypic genus in the family Akaniaceae. The single species, Akania bidwillii (turnipwood), is a tree that is native to subtropical and warm-temperate coastal rainforests in New South Wales and Queensland in Australia. It is known locally as turnipwood because when it is cut down it gives off a foul odour similar to turnips. It blooms with white or pink, fragrant flowers in the spring, and the fruit is a dull-red round capsule that dries down and releases 1-2 seeds. Panicles usually 8–15 cm long; pedicels 5–20 mm long. Calyx 3–4 mm long. Corolla 8–12 mm long.
