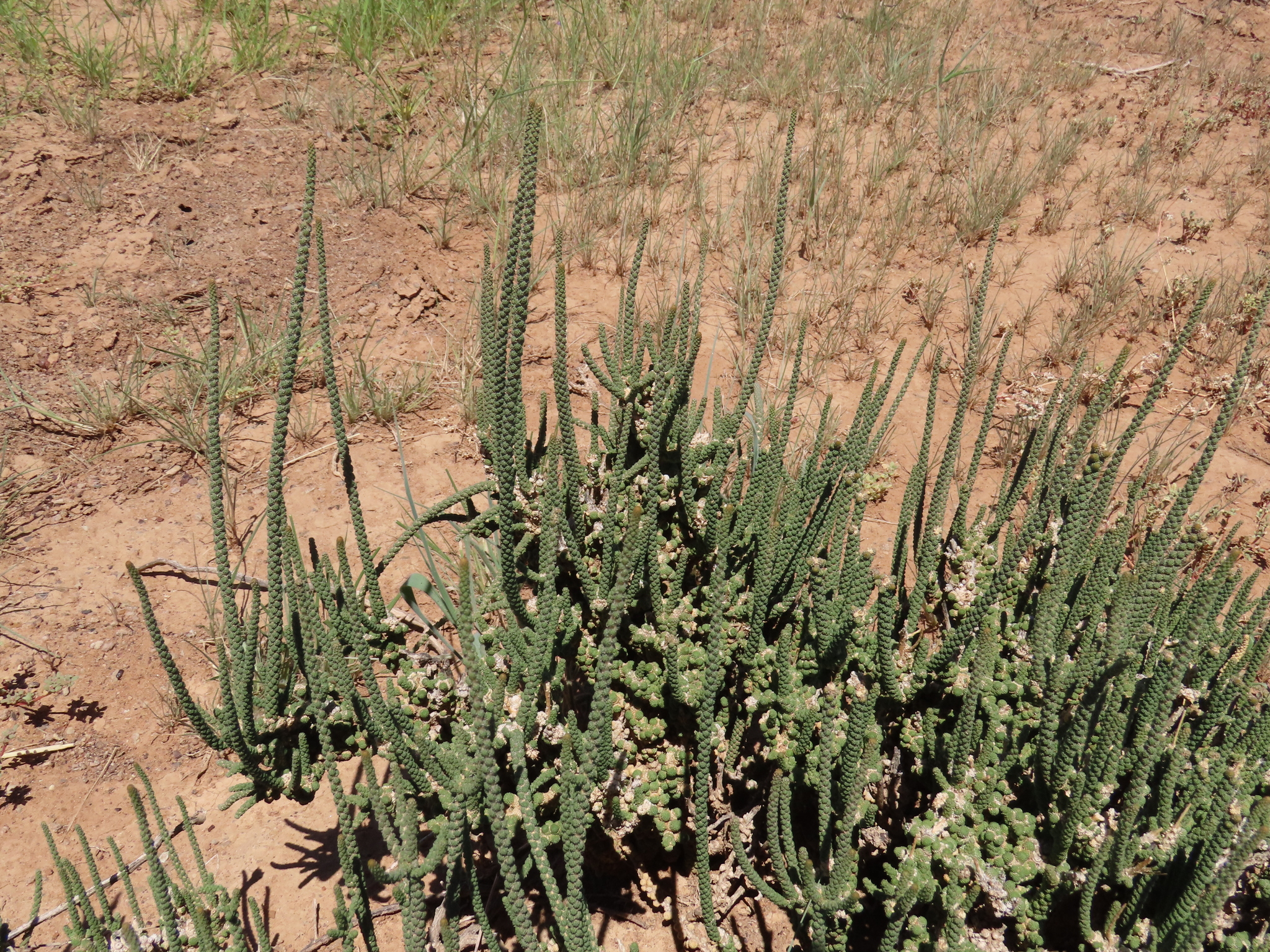

Scientific classification
- Kingdom: Plantae
- Clade: Tracheophytes
- Clade: Angiosperms
- Clade: Eudicots
- Clade: Rosids
- Order: Brassicales
- Family: Tiganophytaceae; Swanepoel, F. Forest & A.E. van Wyk
- Genus: Tiganophyton; Swanepoel, F.Forest & A.E.van Wyk
- Species: T. karasense

Binomial name
- Tiganophyton karasense Swanepoel, F.Forest & A.E.van Wyk

= Tiganophytaceae =

Family of flowering plants

Tiganophytaceae is a family in the plant order Brassicales, consisting of the sole monotypic genus, Tiganophyton, represented by Tiganophyton karasense. The family is endemic to Namibia, occurring in three populations in the arid Karas Region of southern Namibia. It is one of two families endemic to the Namib desert, the other being Welwitschiaceae. The species, genus and family were unknown prior to 2010 when it was discovered in the Karas Region.
