= Emil Bretschneider =

Russian academic (1833–1901)

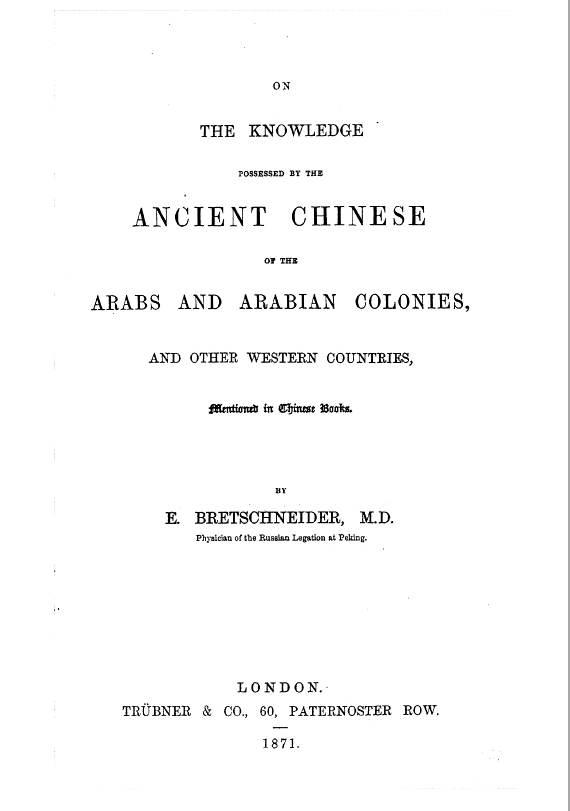
The title-page of Breitschneider's 1871 book

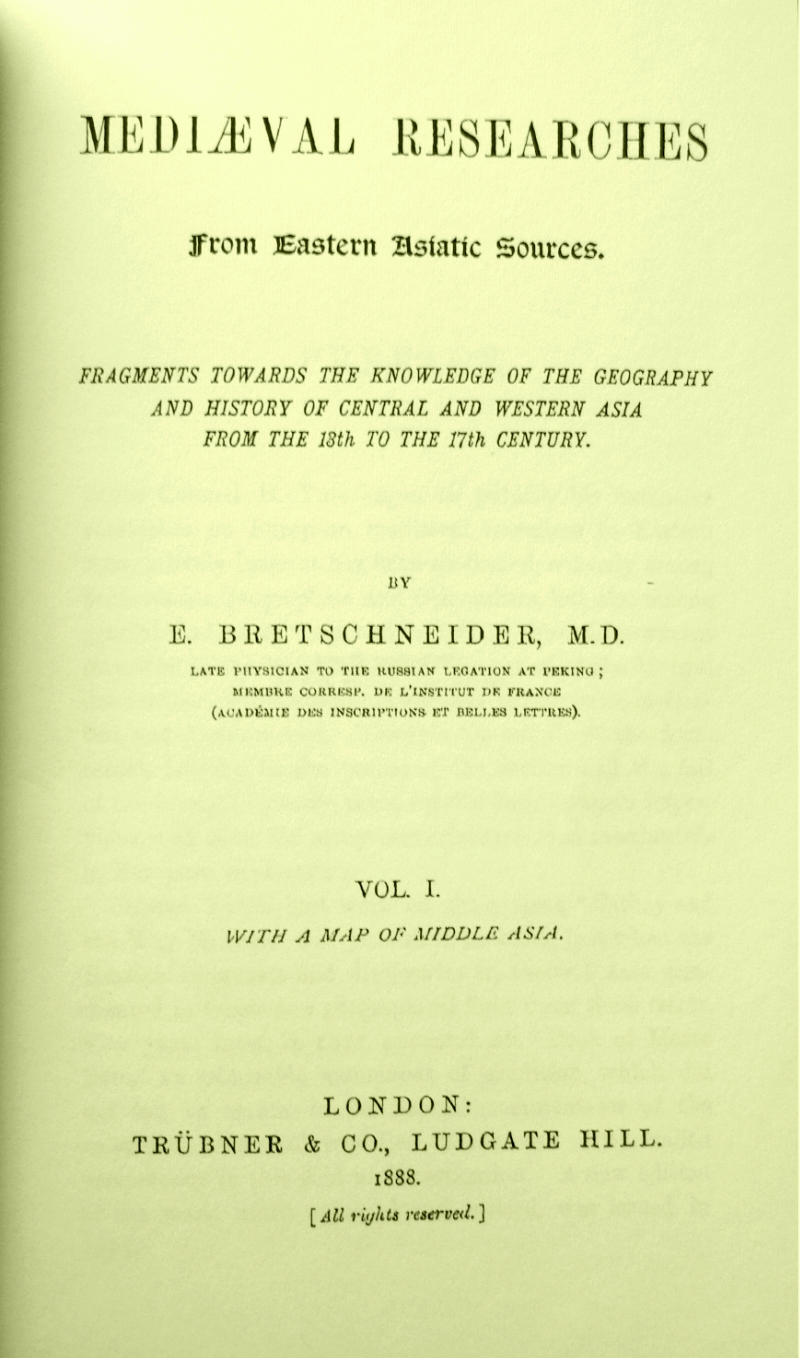
Mediaeval Researches by E. Bretschneider, M.D. Physician of Russian Legation in Peking Correspondent member of Académie des inscriptions et belles-Lettres (AIBL) London, 1888

Emil Bretschneider (4 July [O.S. 22 June] 1833 in Bankaushof (now Benkavas muiža, Saldus novads, Latvia) – 12 May [O.S. 29 April] 1901 in Saint Petersburg) was a sinologist of Baltic German ethnicity and a correspondent member of the Académie française. He operated in the Russian Empire. He graduated from the medical school of the Imperial University of Dorpat in Dorpat Estonia, and was first posted as a physician by the Russian legation to Tehran (1862–65). From 1866 to 1883 he was posted as physician to the 15th and 16th Russian legations to Beijing.

== Overview ==
In 1866 the publication of Cathay and the Way Thither by orientalist Henry Yule stirred up Bretschneider's interest in sinology. However, he felt that the extensive material contained in Chinese books was under-utilized by western sinologists because many of them did not read Chinese, and when they quoted Chinese material, they relied on secondhand sources. Emil Bretschneider while in Pekin befriended the Archimandrite Palladius Kafarov of the Russian Orthodox Church Mission to Pekin, a famous sinologist in his own right; Bretschneider also took advantage of the excellent library of the Russian Orthodox mission with an extensive collection of Chinese books on history, geography and botany, he began his own first hand research into ancient Chinese literature, particularly in botany and geography.

In 1870 he published his first article in sinology: "Fu Sang-- Who discovered America ?", followed by the publication in London of "On the Knowledge Possessed by the Chinese of the Arabs and Arabian Colonies Mentioned in Chinese Books".

In 1875, he published the article "Notes on Chinese medieval travellers to the West" in Shanghai. In 1881 he published "Early European researches into the flora of China (American Presbyterian Mission Press, Shanghai), a topic often ignored by contemporary sinologists due to their lack of training in botany. In this field Bretschneider was a pioneer.

In 1888 he published Mediaeval Researches from Eastern Asiatic Sources, Trübner Oriental Series, London: Trübner & Co.; this book included his English translation of three important Chinese works about the history and geography of central Asia, namely Travel to the West by Yelü Chucai, Genghis Khan's chief adviser; Travels to the West by the Taoist monk Kiu Chang Chun and The Peregrinations of Ye-Lu Hi-Liang (the grandson of Yelu Chucai), translated from the Annals of the Yuan dynasty.

He was a correspondent member of the Académie française.

== Work in botany ==
Bretschneider is also well known as a botanist, having his own herbarium in the mountains close to Pekin. Starting in 1880, Bretschneider sent dried plant specimens to the Royal Botanic Gardens, Kew.

Among the books he published in the field of botany are: "On the Study and Value of Chinese Botanical Works" (1870); "Early European Researches into the Flora of China" (1881); "Botanicon Sinicum" (1882-1895); and his vast "History of European Botanical Studies in China" (1898).

The plant genus Bretschneidera was named in Bretschneider's honor by William Hemsley.

Many plant species bear the epithet bretschneideri, such as Pyrus bretschneideri Rehder.

== Works ==
- Bretschneider, E. (1875). Notes on Chinese Mediaeval Travellers to the West. Shanghai: American Presbyterian Mission Press.
- —— (1876). "Chinese Intercourse with the Countries of Central and Western Asia in the Fifteenth Century". China Review. 4 (6).
- —— (1880). "Early European researches into the flora of China". Journal of the North-China Branch of the Royal Asiatic Society.
- —— (1898). History of European Botanical Discoveries in China. London: Sampson Low, Marston and Company Ltd.

== See also ==
- List of Baltic German scientists

== Sources ==
- "Бретшнейдер, Эмилий Васильевич" . Brockhaus and Efron Encyclopedic Dictionary (in Russian). 1906.
