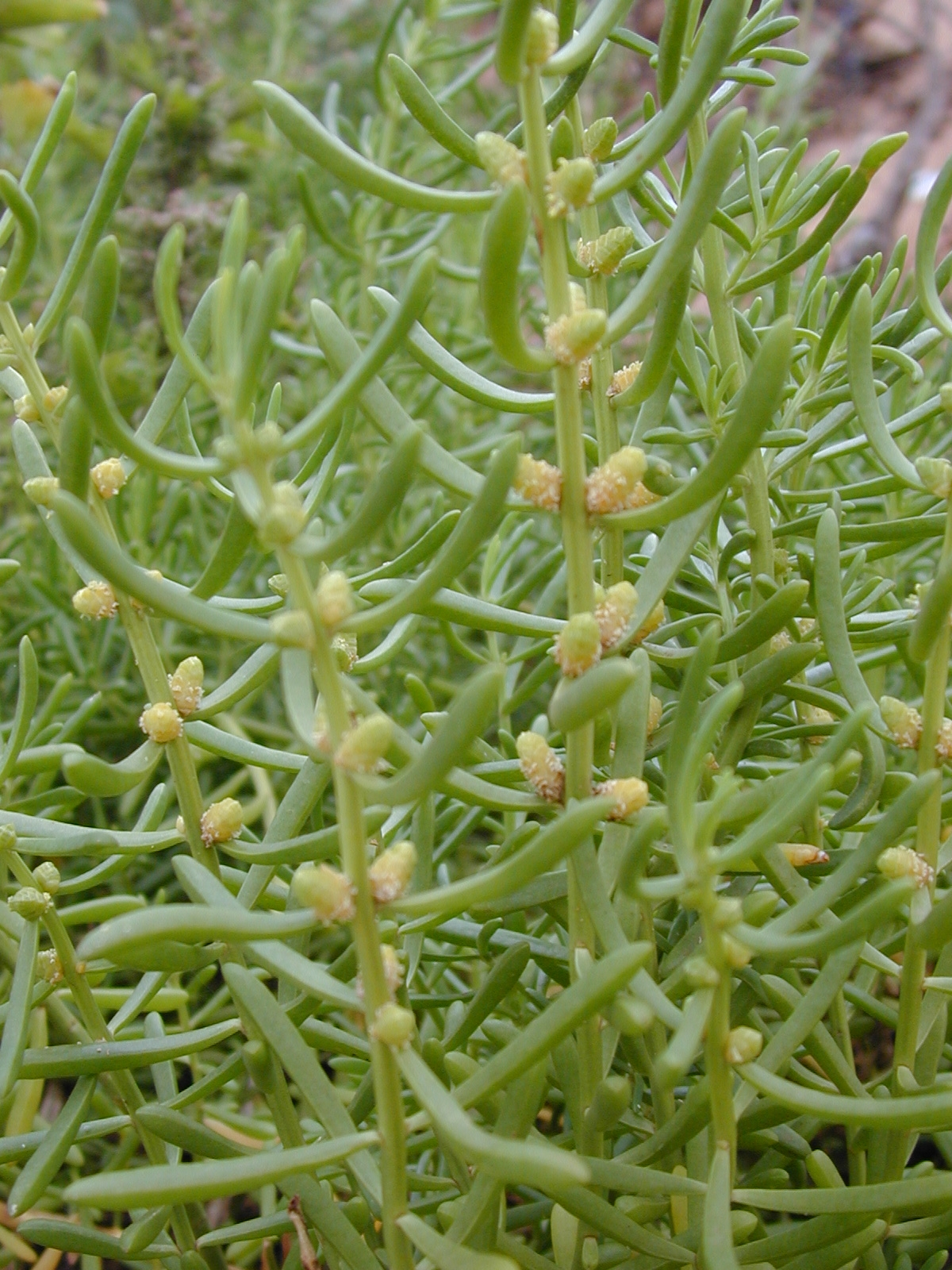

Conservation status
- Least Concern (IUCN 3.1)

Scientific classification
- Kingdom: Plantae
- Clade: Tracheophytes
- Clade: Angiosperms
- Clade: Eudicots
- Clade: Rosids
- Order: Brassicales
- Family: Bataceae
- Genus: Batis
- Species: B. maritima

Binomial name
- Batis maritima L.

Synonyms
- Batis americana L.; Batis californica Torr.

= Batis maritima =

Species of flowering plant

Batis maritima, the saltwort or beachwort (also known as turtleweed, pickleweed, barilla, planta de sal, camphire, herbe-à-crâbes, and akulikuli-kai), is a halophyte. It is a C3-plant, long-lived perennial, dioecious, succulent shrub. The plant forms dense colonies in salt marshes, brackish marshes, and mangrove swamps and frequently is found on the margins of saltpans and wind-tidal flats. Batis maritima is a pioneer plant, covers quickly areas where hurricanes have destroyed the natural vegetation.

As of 2003, Batis maritima has not been used commercially for food production but the seeds have a high oil content with high nutritional value.

== Morphology ==
Plants are dioecious, perennial sub shrubs 0.1–1.5 m tall and form dense colonies. The succulent leaves are opposite and sessile. The small, white flowers of Batis maritima are self-incompatible and the morphology of the pollen indicate that the plant is wind pollinated.

Seeds are 1.1 mm long and 0.8 mm wide and have an extreme low weight (0.5 mg/seed). They have a smooth, very dark and hard walled coating and an elongated lenticular shape. It has been reported that they have germinated after several months of floating in seawater.

The primary root branches early in development and is unbranched until the shoot is 10 cm or more in height.

== Geographical distribution and environmental requirements ==
Batis maritima occurs on both Atlantic and Pacific tropical coasts of the three Americas and the Caribbean Islands. The northern distribution (up to 33º N latitude) appears to be influenced by frost events. Many sites where maritime saltwort occurs are subject to severe tropical storms. It typically occurs at elevations less than 1.0 m above mean sea level and at sites where salinity ranges from 18 to 50 ppt (muddy tidal banks, mangrove swamps, salt-marshes, mud and salt flats). It also grows in soils without salt but is vulnerable to competition from nonhalophytes. Batis maritima occurs in sites normally subject to minimal sand coverage. Wrack deposits seem to stimulate growth. Maritime saltwort has been reported as an invasive species in Hawaii, where it displaces native species.

The ability to produce adequate levels of biomass over a wide environmental range have been well documented. The plant is not seriously affected by insects, disease, or grazing, but the shoots cannot bear sand coverage.

== Product use ==
Leaves occasionally are added to salads in Puerto Rico, it has also been used as a pot herb, puree and pickle . The seeds are added to salads, they can be toasted or “popped” like corn. The Comcáac used the roots to sweeten coffee before they had access to sugar. The yellow to golden hued meal is used for food. Due to its high oil content it has the potential to be an oil crop. Batis maritima has been used in folk herbal medicine in Puerto Rico to treat gout, eczema, psoriasis, rheumatism, blood disorders, and thyroid disorders.

=== Seeds ===
content	amount
carbs	46,5 %
fructose	0.1 %
glucose	0.03 %
sucrose	1.20 %
fat	25 %
protein	17.3 %
water	7.3 %
calcium	1600 ppm
iron	259 ppm
magnesium	4200 ppm
phosphorus	8400 ppm
potassium	8500 ppm
sodium	500 ppm

Main component of seeds are carbohydrates. The extremely small starch granule size, could be useful for other food and non food applications, which require small starch granules. Overall low values of soluble sugars, especially sucrose, are found. The seed contains high levels of crude protein. The vast majority of its storage proteins are of the aqueous soluble form. It is also a good source of the essential amino acids lysine and methionine which are usually the limiting amino acids found in most studied cereal grains. Seeds contain substantial amounts of oil (25.0%) similar to those found in safflower, cottonseed and sunflower. With a linoleic acid C 18:2 content of 73% it has one of the highest C18:2 contents of any oil known. It also rich in tocopherols, particularly a-tocopherol 0.07% (700 mg/kg) and shows high levels of phytosterol 2427.4 mg/kg. Those compounds are considered to be very healthy. The seeds are rich in elements like phosphorus (P), potassium (K), calcium (Ca), magnesium (Mg) and iron (Fe). Examination of the seed for sodium (Na) did not reveal any elevated accumulation of this element (i.e., 500 ppm) which would be of nutritional concern.

== Physiology ==
It is recognized as a major colonizer after mangroves are destroyed by hurricanes. Although it is not a water plant, it can endure brief flooding and long periods of waterlogged soils. Saltwort grows slowly in soils with high salt concentrations but it suffers little competition from other plants. The species manages salts by sequestering them in cell vacuoles and eventually shedding the leaves. Obligate-symbiotic vesicular-arbuscular mycorrhizae (VAM) that colonize the roots indirectly reduce water stress and improve phosphate nutrition.
