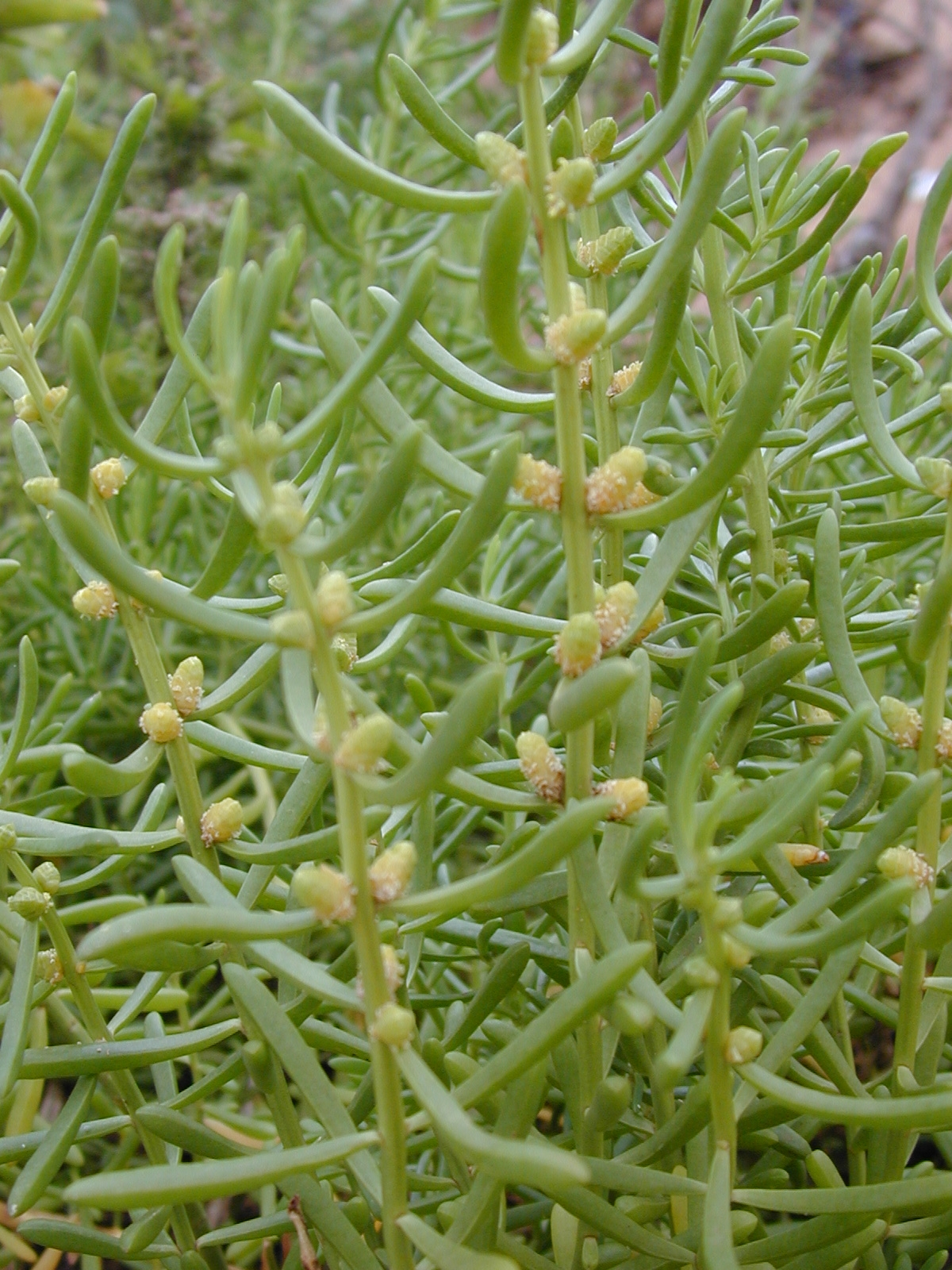
- Male flowers on Batis maritima

Scientific classification
- Kingdom: Plantae
- Clade: Embryophytes
- Clade: Tracheophytes
- Clade: Angiosperms
- Clade: Eudicots
- Clade: Rosids
- Order: Brassicales
- Family: Bataceae; Mart. ex Perleb
- Genus: Batis; L.

Species
- Batis argillicola P.Royen; Batis maritima L.

= Batis (plant) =

Genus of plants

Batis (turtleweed, saltwort, beachwort, or pickleweed) is a genus of two species of flowering plants, the only genus in the family Bataceae. They are halophytic (salt tolerant) plants, native to the coastal salt marshes of warm temperate and tropical America (B. maritima) and tropical Australasia (B. argillicola).

== Morphology and taxonomy ==
Both species are evergreen, low shrubs growing to 10–70 cm tall, prostrate where colonizing new mud, but once rooted, growing bushy. The leaves are small, swollen, fleshy, and narrowly club-shaped. They are bright green, but can also take on a reddish color. The flowers are small, produced in nonshowy spikes, flowering from midsummer to fall. The American species is dioecious, while the Australasian species is monoecious.

Some botanists divide B. maritima into five species, with B. californica, B. fruticosa, B. spinosa and B. vermiculatus split off, but this interpretation is not widely followed.

== Range and habitat ==
Batis has the ability to live in salty environments. When other plants are exposed to salty soil or water, they lose most of their stored water, but Batis has adapted to this environment and does not have these problems. To help it survive in this salty habitat, its fleshy leaves are covered with very fine hairs that reduce the amount of water the plant loses to the air.

An example habitat of occurrence of Batis maritima is in the Petenes mangroves ecoregion of the Yucatán.

Not many animals can eat it because it is too salty, but white-tailed deer eat B. maritima as part of their diets. Eastern pygmy-blue butterflies collect the nectar from its flowers. B. maritima is becoming rare in some areas, and some scientists think it should be added to the United States endangered species list, though it has also become an invasive species in Hawaii after accidental introduction there.

== Terminology ==
The genus Salsola is also sometimes known as saltwort, but is unrelated.

== Uses ==
Batis maritima was used by Native Americans as a food, the roots were chewed (like sugar cane) or boiled into a beverage, while the stems and leaves were eaten raw, cooked or pickled. B. argillicola is also eaten as a green vegetable.

An analysis of saltwort's peppercorn-sized seeds has revealed they are extremely nutritious, having high quantities of proteins, oils, and starches . The seeds are edible, having a nutty taste, and they can be added to salads, toasted, or even made into miniature popcorn. The oil is almost identical to safflower oil, which is used for cooking and in salad dressings, as well as for making margarine. The seeds also contain beneficial antioxidants, such as tocopherols, which are thought to fight cancer.
