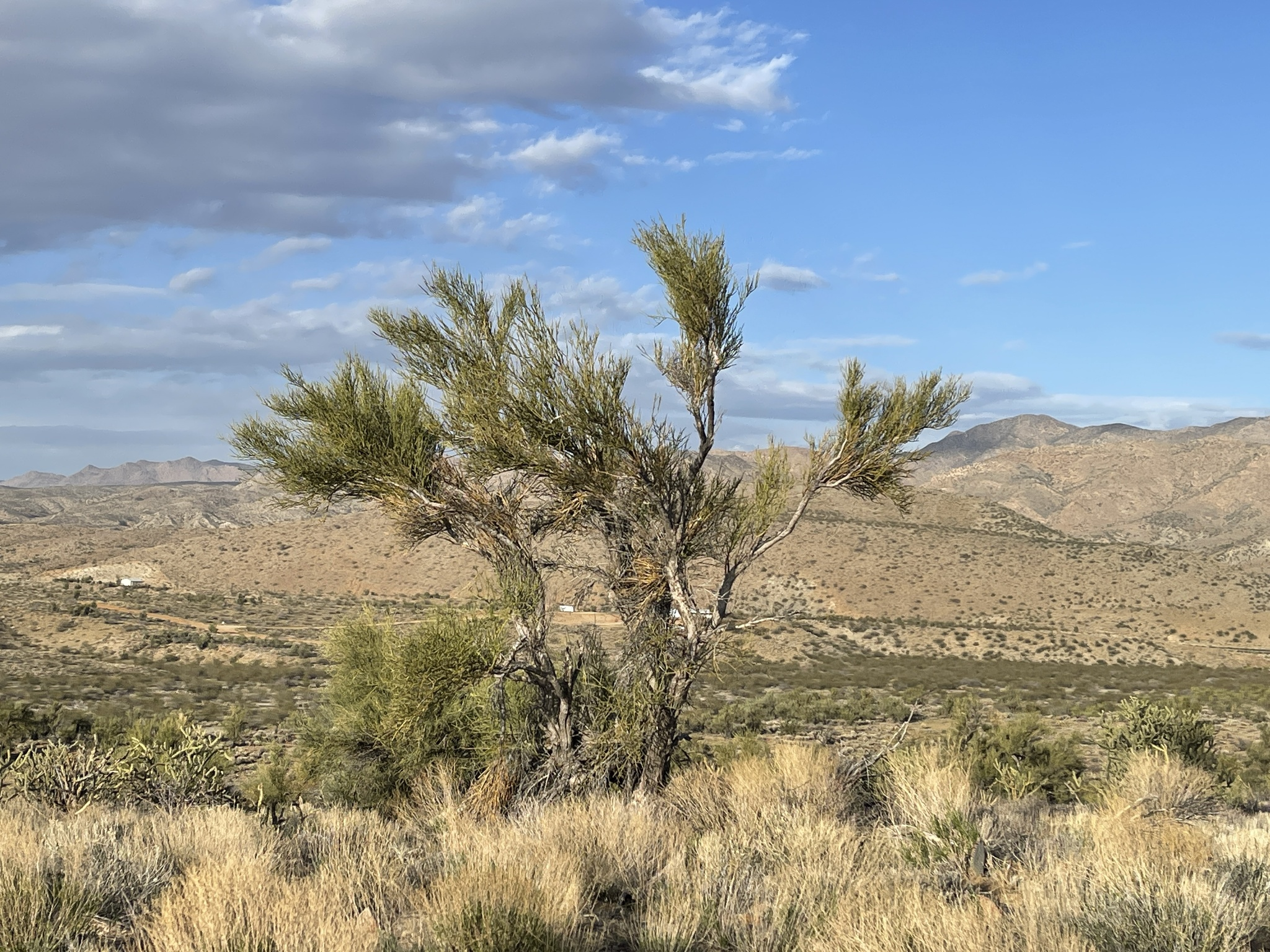
- Canotia holacantha

Scientific classification
- Kingdom: Plantae
- Clade: Tracheophytes
- Clade: Angiosperms
- Clade: Eudicots
- Clade: Rosids
- Order: Celastrales
- Family: Celastraceae
- Genus: Canotia; Torr. (1857)

Species
- Canotia holacantha Torr.; Canotia wendtii M.C.Johnst.

= Canotia =

Genus of plants

Canotia is a genus of flowering plants in the family Celastraceae. It includes two species native to northern Mexico, Arizona, and Utah.

- Canotia holacantha Torr.
- Canotia wendtii M.C.Johnst.
