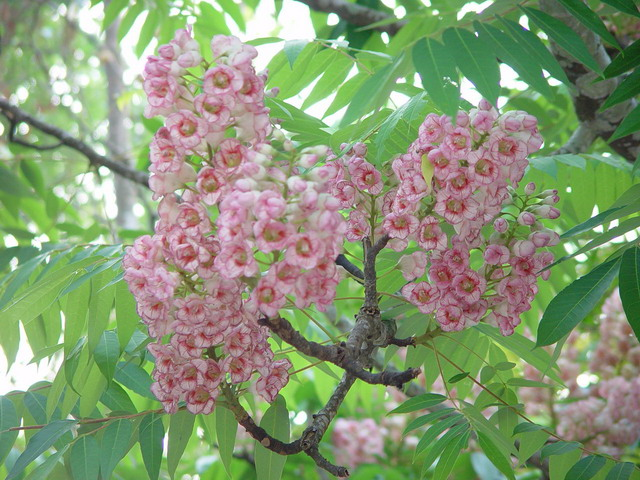

Conservation status
- Endangered (IUCN 2.3)

Scientific classification
- Kingdom: Plantae
- Clade: Tracheophytes
- Clade: Angiosperms
- Clade: Eudicots
- Clade: Rosids
- Order: Brassicales
- Family: Akaniaceae
- Genus: Bretschneidera; Hemsl.
- Species: B. sinensis

Binomial name
- Bretschneidera sinensis Hemsl.

Synonyms
- Bretschneidera yunshanensis Chun & F.C.How

= Bretschneidera =

Genus of trees

Bretschneidera sinensis, the sole species in genus Bretschneidera, is a rare, 10–20 metres (33–66 ft) tall a monotypic species of tree with large inflorescences. It is found in south and east of China, Taiwan, northern Thailand and northern Vietnam. It is threatened by habitat loss. Because of its relatively recent discovery in Taiwan and Thailand, it is possible that it could also be found in Laos and northern Myanmar. It was named in honor of Emil Bretschneider.

In Thailand it is known as Chompoo Phu Kha (Thai: ชมพูภูคา) and is found only in Doi Phu Kha National Park on the Luang Prabang Range where it flowers in February and March.

The taxonomic position of genus Bretschneidera is enigmatic, and it has also been placed in its own family, Bretschneideraceae.

== Reproduction ==
B. sinensis has an outcrossing entomophily breeding system with protogyny and a high P/O ratio, and is pollinated by a variety of insects, with the main pollinators belonging to Hymenoptera. low fruit production, habitat destruction, low numbers of flowering individuals, and low pollen transfer efficacy are leading to the continued endangerment of the species.
