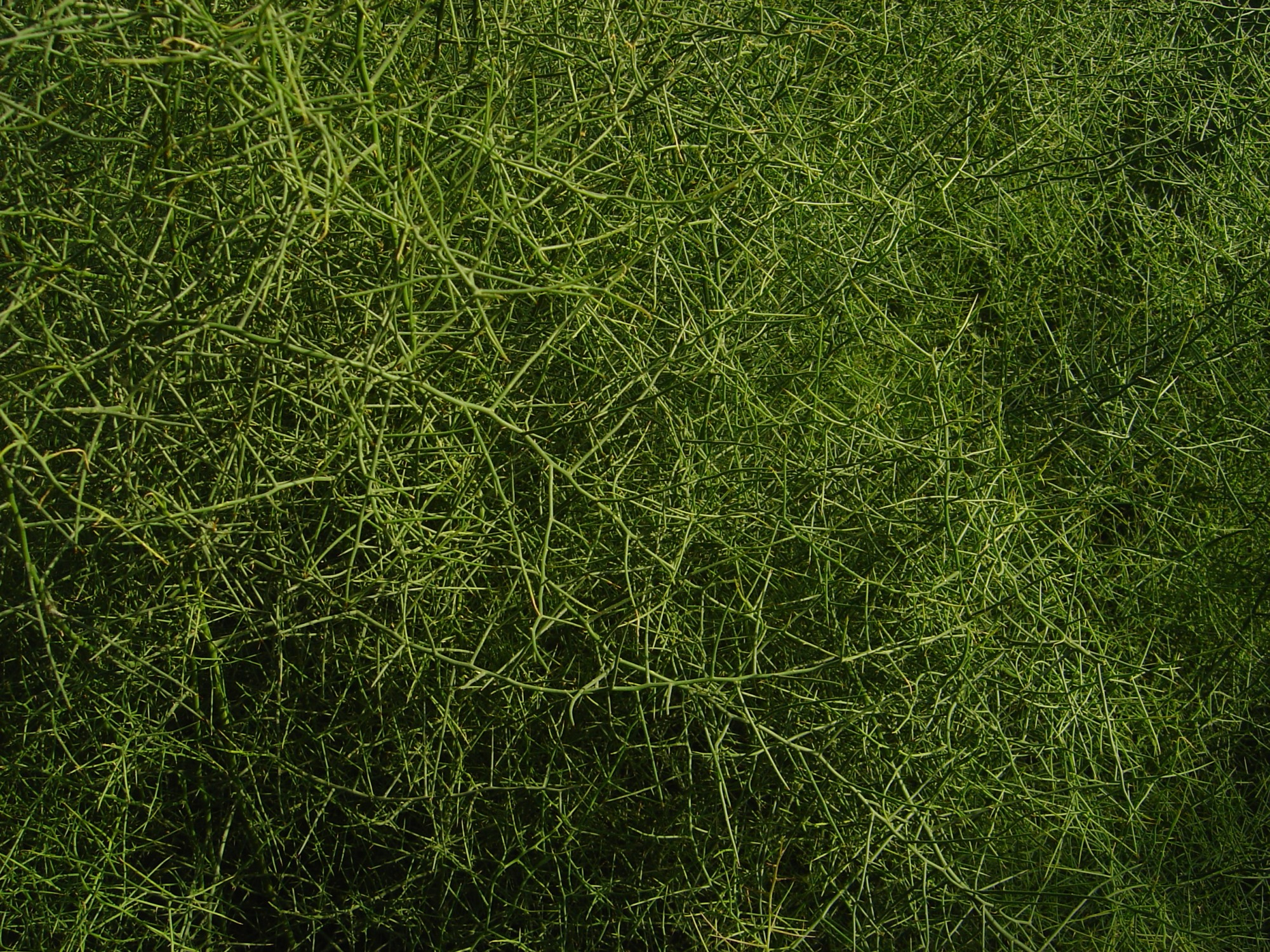
- Koeberlinia spinosa

Scientific classification
- Kingdom: Plantae
- Clade: Tracheophytes
- Clade: Angiosperms
- Clade: Eudicots
- Clade: Rosids
- Order: Brassicales
- Family: Koeberliniaceae; Engl.
- Genus: Koeberlinia; Zucc.

= Koeberlinia =

Genus of flowering plants

Koeberlinia is a genus of flowering plant. It is the sole genus in the family Koeberliniaceae. Alternately it is treated as a member of the Capparaceae.

== Species ==
Koeberlinia includes two species:

- Koeberlinia holacantha W.C. Holmes, K. L. Yip & Rushing - Native to Bolivia
- Koeberlinia spinosa Zucc. - Native to the southwestern United States and northern Mexico
