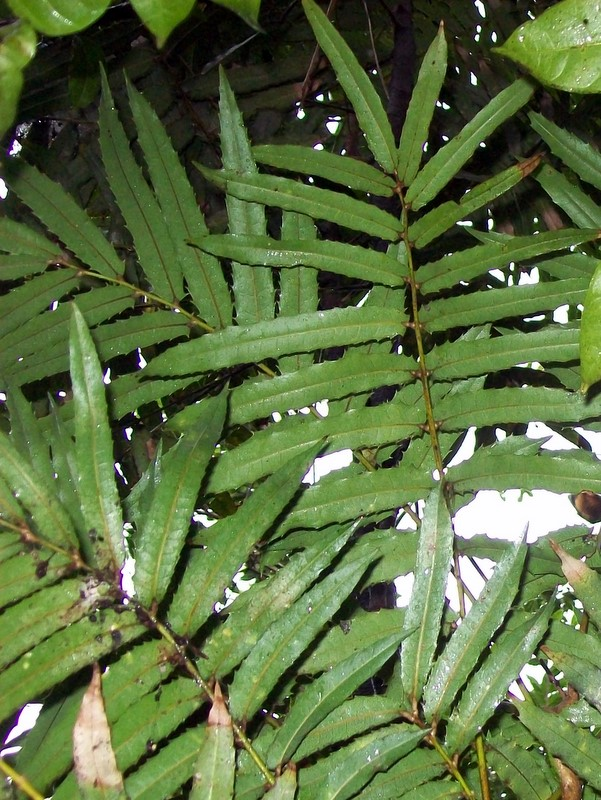
- Akania bidwillii

Scientific classification
- Kingdom: Plantae
- Clade: Tracheophytes
- Clade: Angiosperms
- Clade: Eudicots
- Clade: Rosids
- Order: Brassicales
- Family: Akaniaceae; Stapf

Genera
- Akania; Bretschneidera

= Akaniaceae =

Family of flowering plants

The Akaniaceae or turnipwood family are a family of flowering plants in the order Brassicales. They comprise two genera of trees, Akania and Bretschneidera, each with a single species. These plants are native to China, Vietnam, Taiwan, and eastern Australia.

== Species ==
- Akania bidwillii (turnipwood) - northeastern Australia
- Bretschneidera sinensis - southern China, Taiwan, Thailand and Vietnam
