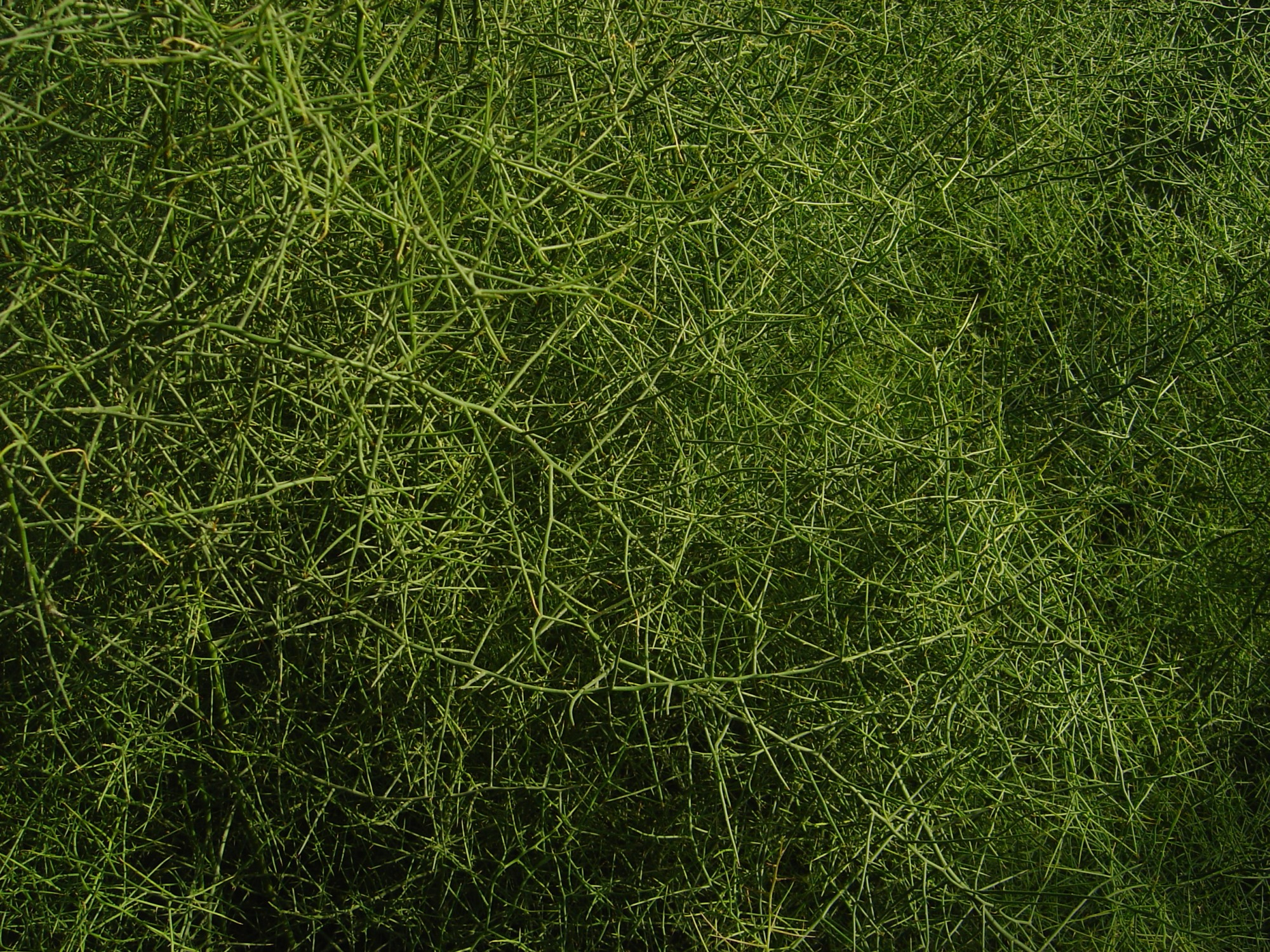

Conservation status
- Least Concern (IUCN 3.1)

- Apparently Secure (NatureServe)

Scientific classification
- Kingdom: Plantae
- Clade: Tracheophytes
- Clade: Angiosperms
- Clade: Eudicots
- Clade: Rosids
- Order: Brassicales
- Family: Koeberliniaceae
- Genus: Koeberlinia
- Species: K. spinosa

Binomial name
- Koeberlinia spinosa Zucc.
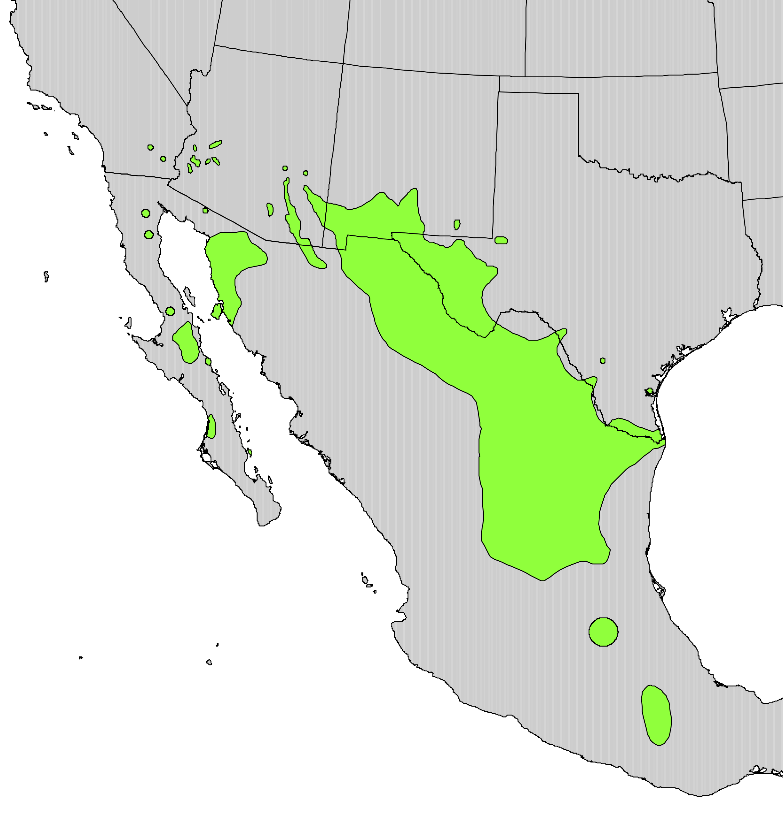
- Natural range

= Koeberlinia spinosa =

Species of flowering plant

Koeberlinia spinosa is a species of flowering plant native to the southwestern United States and northern Mexico known by several common names, including crown of thorns, allthorn, smokebush, and crucifixion thorn. It is one of two species of the genus Koeberlinia, which is sometimes considered to be the only genus in the plant family Koeberliniaceae. Alternately it is treated as a member of the caper family. This is a shrub of moderate to large size, sprawling to maximum heights over 4 m (13 ft). It is entirely green while growing and is made up of tangling straight stems which branch many times. The tip of each rigid stem branch tapers into a long, sharp spine. Leaves are mainly rudimentary, taking the form of tiny deciduous scales. Most of the photosynthesis occurs in the green stem branches. The shrub blooms abundantly in white to greenish-white flowers. The fruits are shiny black berries each a few millimetres long; they are attractive to birds.

Koeberlinia spinosa can be found in northern regions of the Mexican Plateau and in the east down into the northern foothills of the Sierra Madre Orientals. In the west it ranges into the southern, and central Sonoran Desert of Sonora, and southern and southwestern Arizona; it also ranges into three areas of Baja California Sur-(part of the Sonoran Desert).
