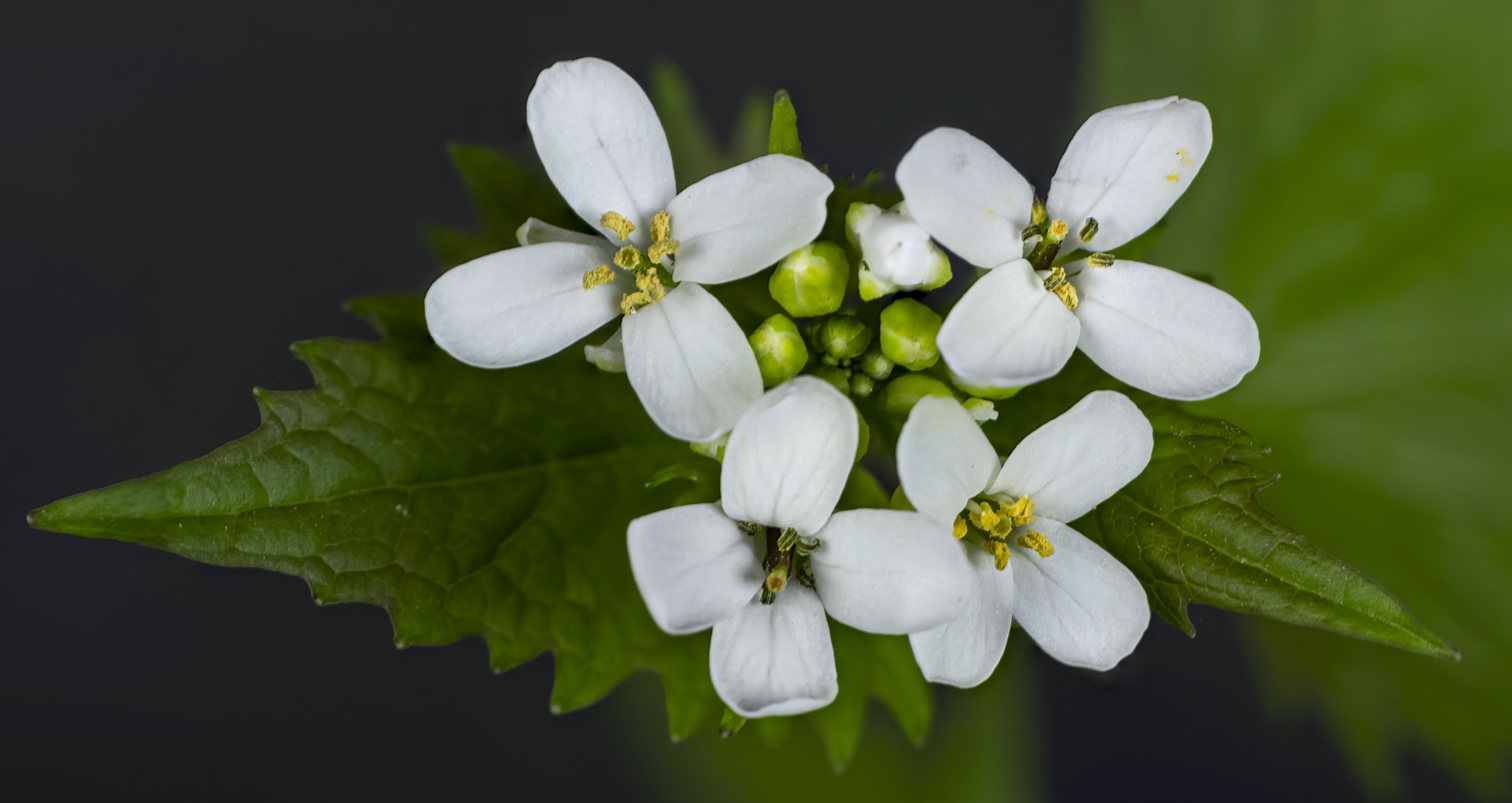
- Alliaria petiolata, garlic mustard (Brassicaceae)

Scientific classification
- Kingdom: Plantae
- Clade: Embryophytes
- Clade: Tracheophytes
- Clade: Angiosperms
- Clade: Eudicots
- Clade: Rosids
- Clade: Malvids
- Order: Brassicales; Bromhead

Families
- Akaniaceae; Bataceae; Brassicaceae; Capparaceae; Caricaceae; Cleomaceae; Emblingiaceae; Gyrostemonaceae; Koeberliniaceae; Limnanthaceae; Moringaceae; Pentadiplandraceae; Resedaceae; Salvadoraceae; Setchellanthaceae; Tiganophytaceae; Tovariaceae; Tropaeolaceae

= Brassicales =

Order of dicot flowering plants

The Brassicales (or Cruciales) are an order of flowering plants, belonging to the malvid group of eudicotyledons under the APG IV system. Well-known members of Brassicales include cabbage, cauliflower, Brussels sprout, broccoli, kale, mustard, turnip, bok choy, rapeseed, radish, horseradish, caper, papaya, moringa or drumstick tree, mignonette, nasturtium, and arabidopsis.

One character common to many members of the order is the production of isothiocyanate (mustard oil) compounds. Most systems of classification have included this order, although sometimes under the name Capparales (the name chosen depending on which is thought to have priority).

The order typically contains the following families:

- Akaniaceae – two species of turnipwood trees, native to Asia and eastern Australia
- Bataceae – salt-tolerant shrubs from America and Australasia
- Brassicaceae – mustard and cabbage family; may include the Cleomaceae
- Capparaceae – caper family, sometimes included in Brassicaceae
- Caricaceae – papaya family
- Cleomaceae
- Emblingiaceae
- Gyrostemonaceae – several genera of small shrubs and trees endemic to temperate parts of Australia
- Koeberliniaceae – one species of thorn bush native to Mexico and the US Southwest
- Limnanthaceae – meadowfoam family
- Moringaceae – thirteen species of trees from Africa and India including the drumstick
- Pentadiplandraceae – African species whose berries have two highly sweet tasting proteins
- Resedaceae – mignonette family
- Salvadoraceae – three genera found from Africa to Java
- Setchellanthaceae
- Tiganophytaceae
- Tovariaceae
- Tropaeolaceae – nasturtium family

== Classification ==
The following diagram shows the phylogeny of the Brassicales families along with their estimated ages, based on a 2018 study of plastid DNA:

Brassicales families

- 36
  - - Akaniaceae
    - **Tropaeolaceae**
- 92
  - 64
    - Moringaceae
    - **Caricaceae**
  - - Setchellanthaceae
    - 85
      - Limnanthaceae
      - 78
        - - Salvadoraceae
          - Bataceae
        - 73
          - Koeberliniaceae
          - 66
            - Emblingiaceae
            - 61
              - 55
                - Pentadiplandraceae
                - 46
                  - **Resedaceae**
                  - Gyrostemonaceae
              - - Tovariaceae
                - 49
                  - **Capparaceae**
                  - 43
                    - **Cleomaceae**
                    - **Brassicaceae**

Phylogentic relationships based on data from plastid DNA. The numbers next to each branching point indicate its estimated date (million years ago). Families with more than 30 species are in **bold**.

On 20 April 2020, a newly described monotypic species from Namibia, namely, Tiganophyton karasense Swanepoel, F.Forest & A.E. van Wyk is placed under this order as a monotypic member of new family Tiganophytaceae, which is closely related to Bataceae, Salvadoraceae and Koeberliniaceae.

== Historic classifications ==
Under the Cronquist system, the Brassicales were called the Capparales, and included among the "Dilleniidae". The only families included were the Brassicaceae and Capparaceae (treated as separate families), the Tovariaceae, Resedaceae, and Moringaceae. Other taxa now included here were placed in various other orders.

The families Capparaceae and Brassicaceae are closely related. One group, consisting of Cleome and related genera, was traditionally included in the Capparaceae but doing so results in a paraphyletic Capparaceae. Therefore, this group is generally now either included in the Brassicaceae or as its own family, Cleomaceae.

== Gallery of type genera ==
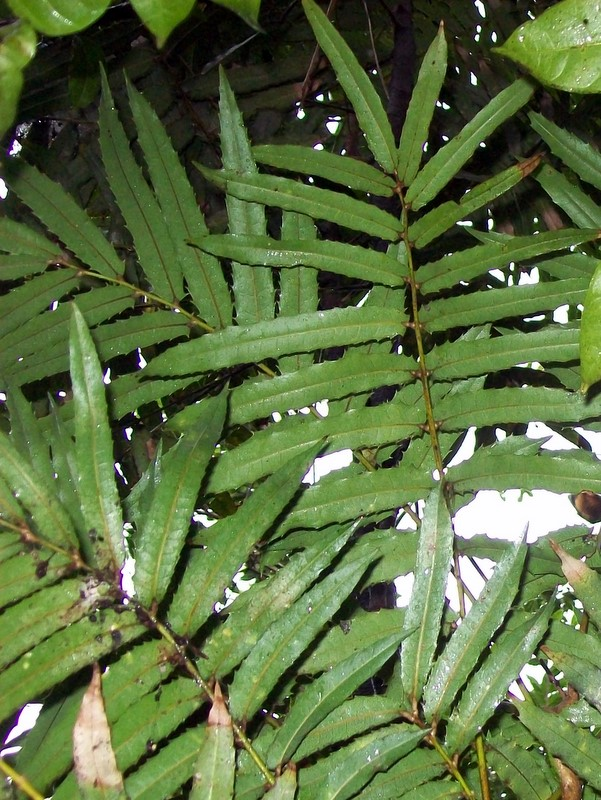
Akania bidwillii (turnipwood family)

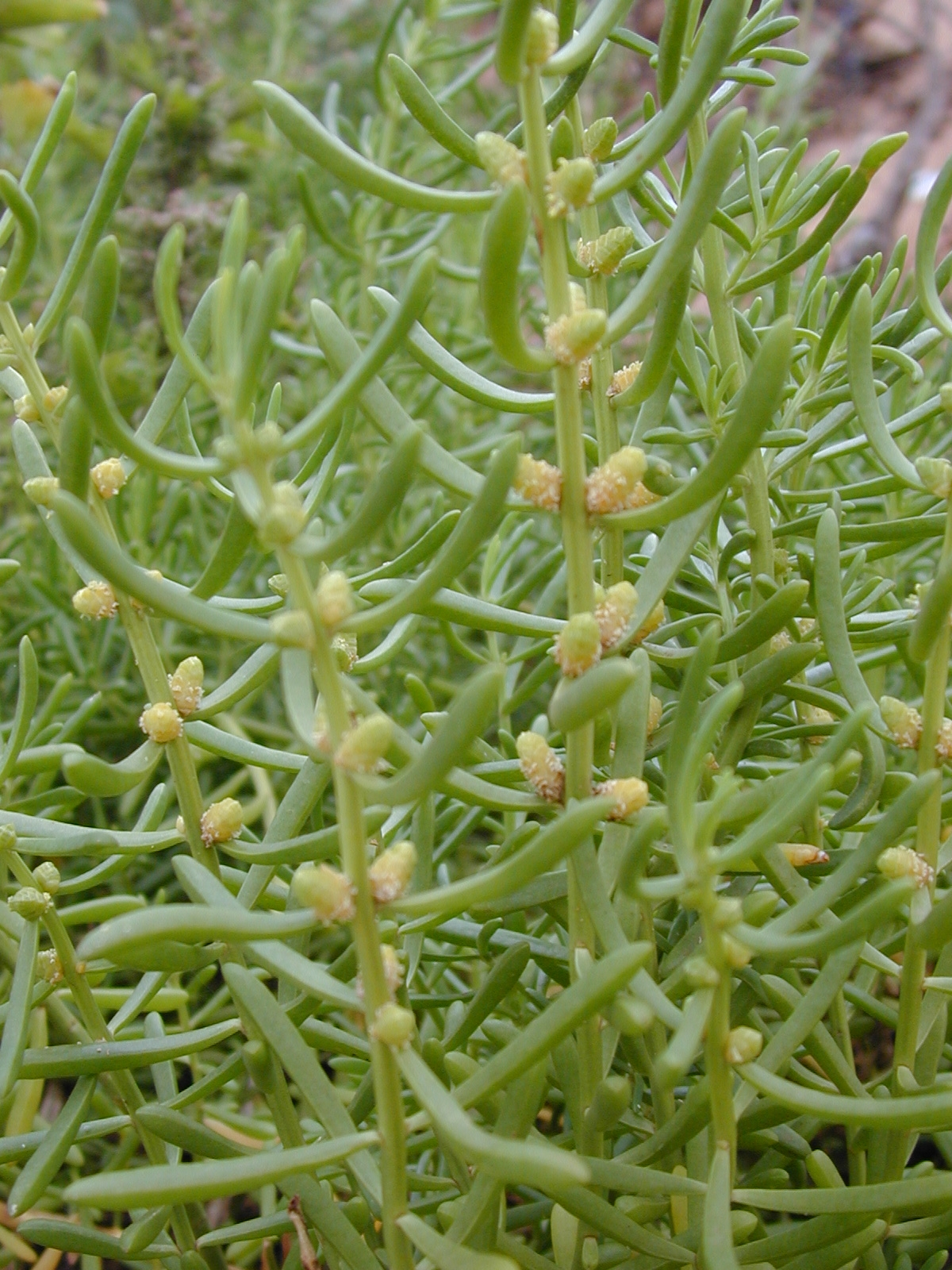
Batis maritima (turtleweed family)

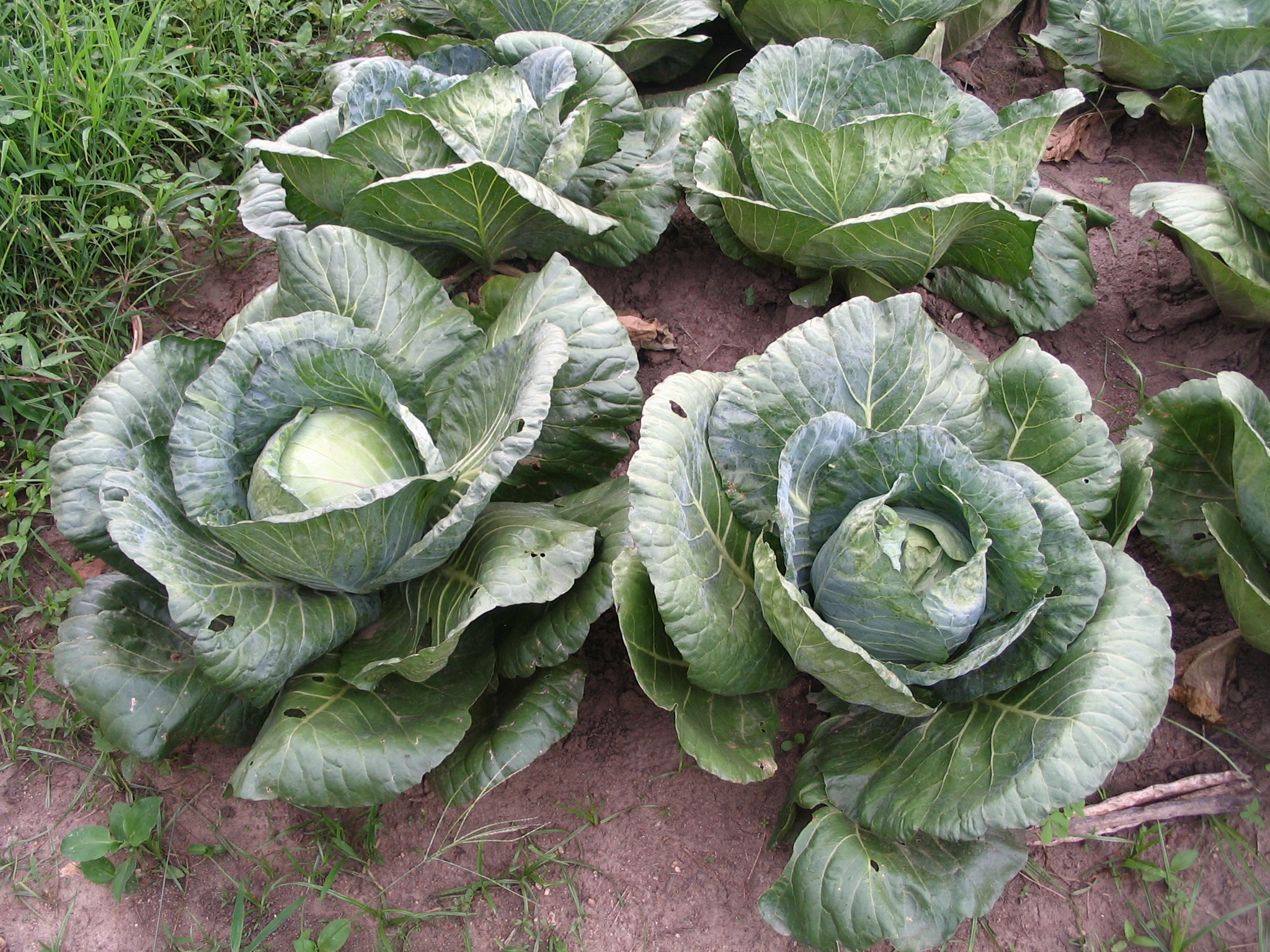
Brassica oleracea (cabbage family)

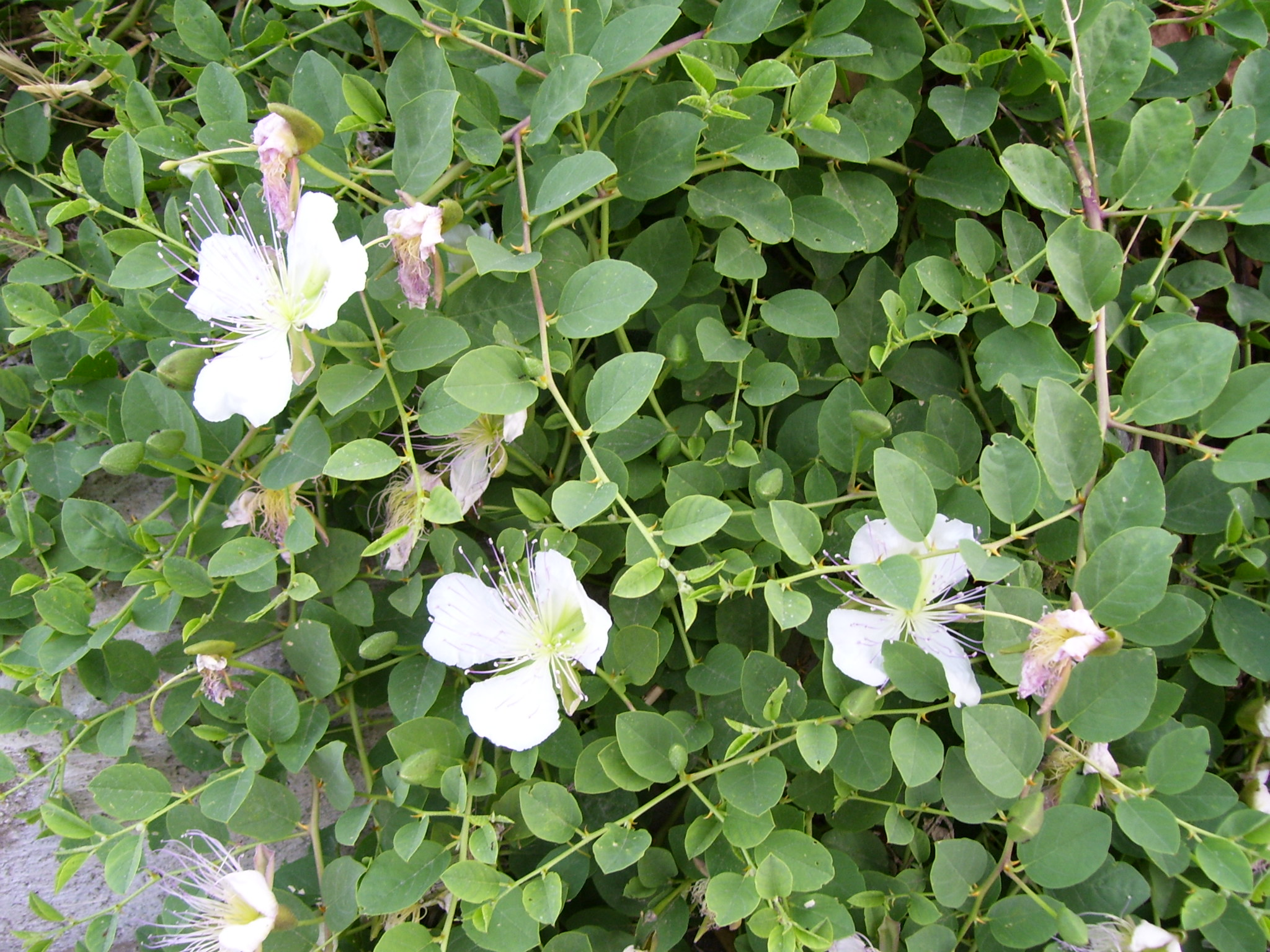
Capparis spinosa (caper family)

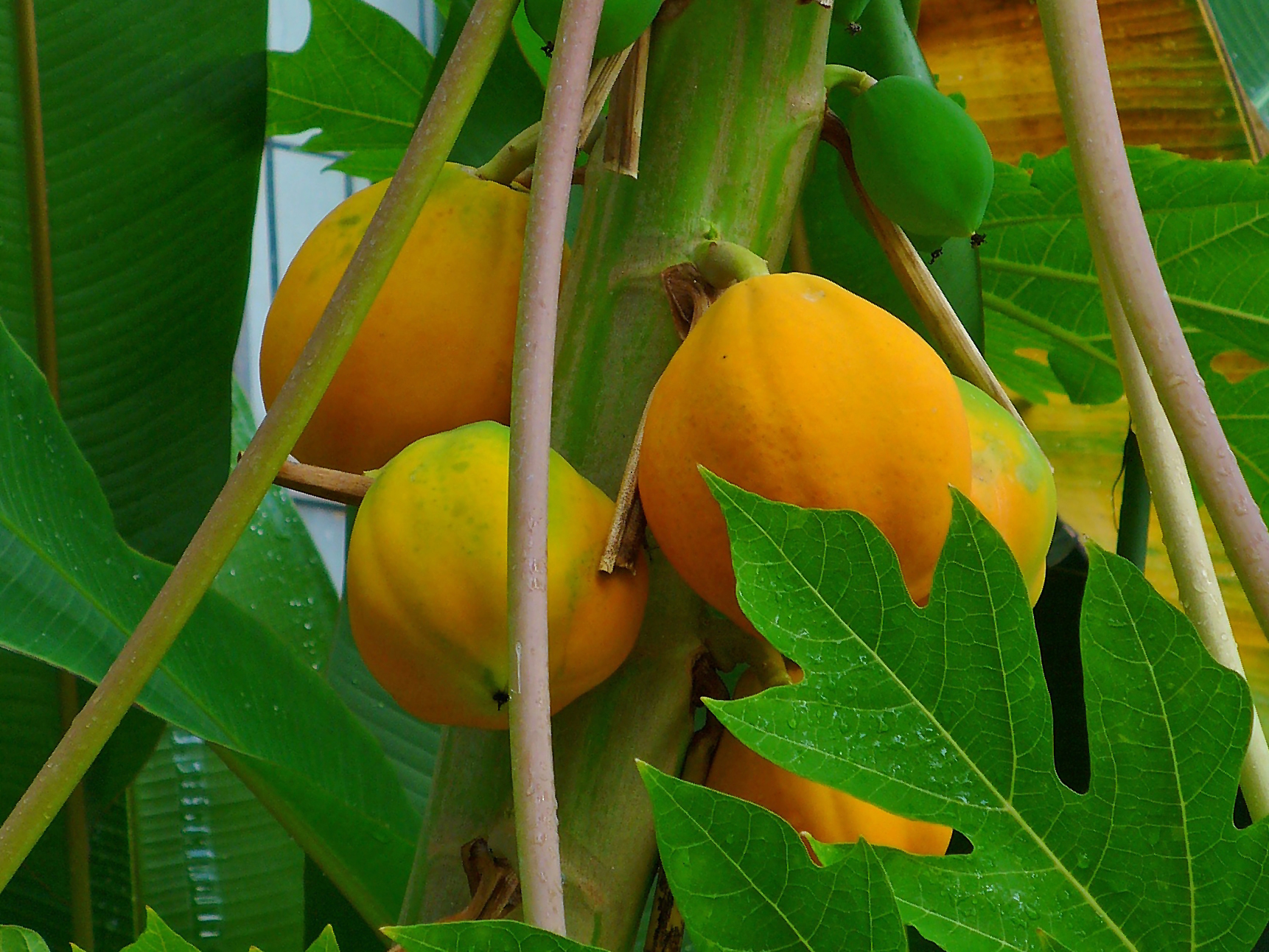
Carica papaya (papaya family)

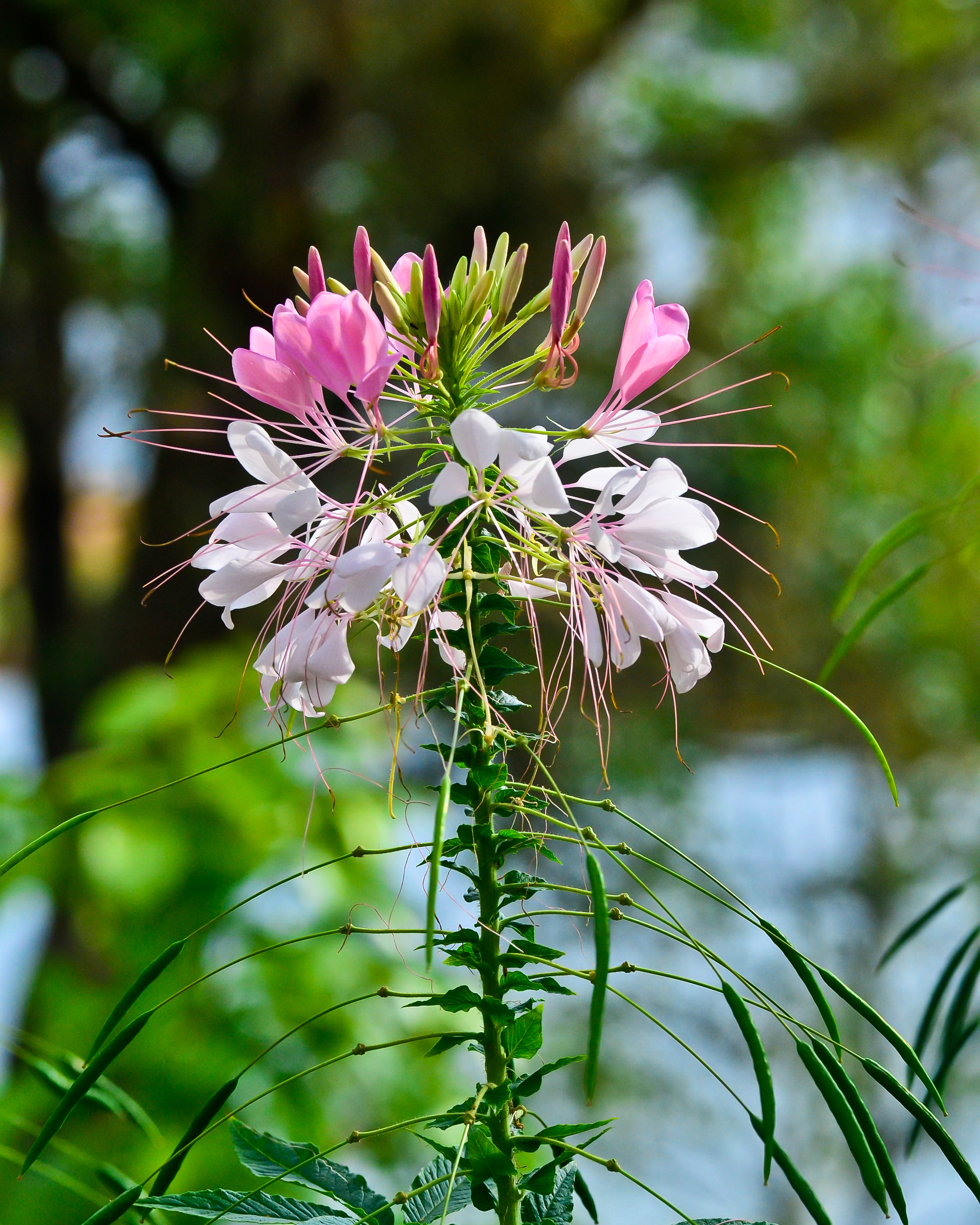
Cleome hassleriana (spiderflower family)

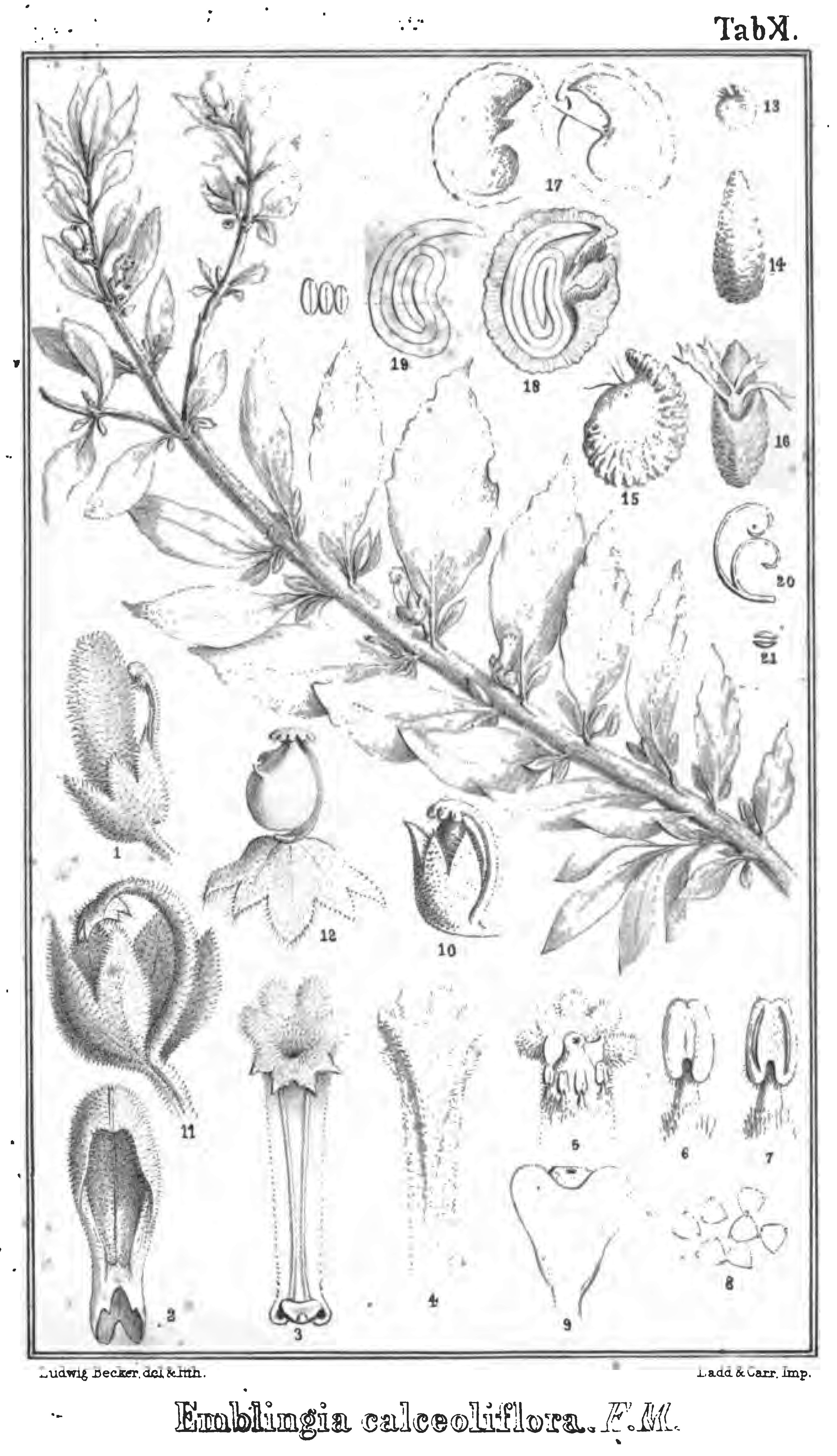
Emblingia calceoliflora (slippercreeper family)

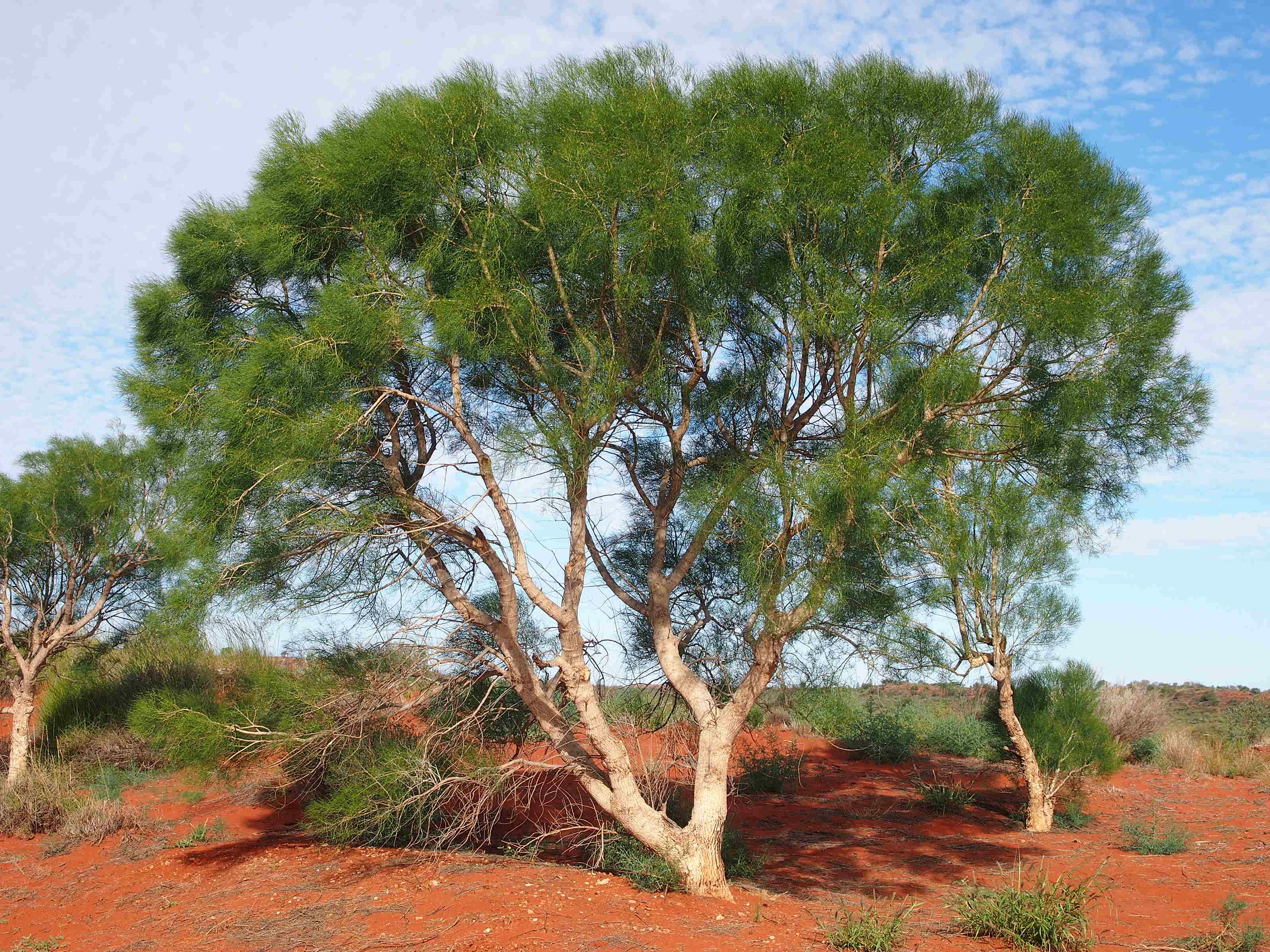
Gyrostemon ramulosis (buttoncreeper family)

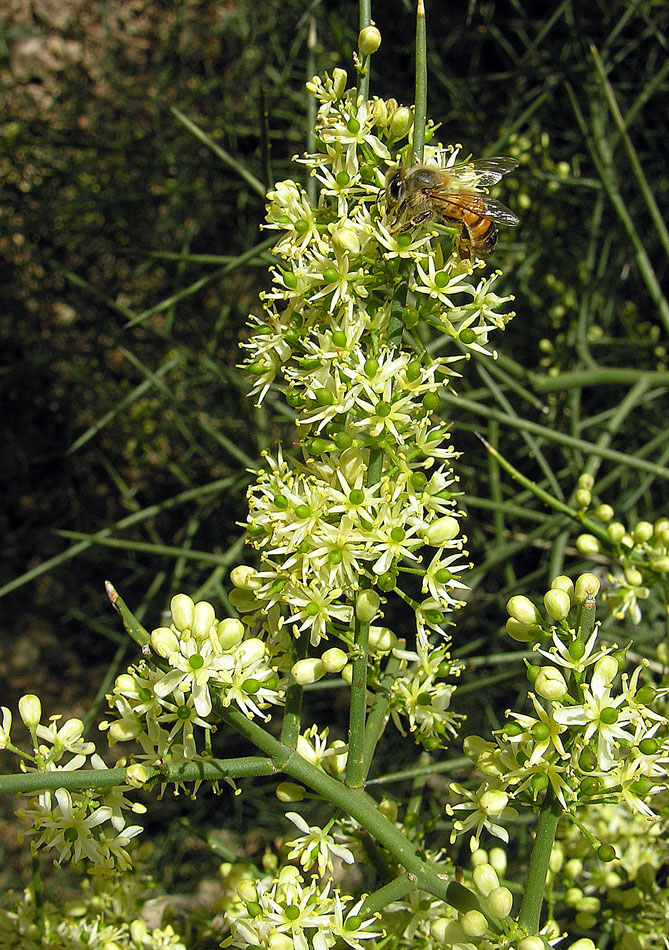
Koeberlinia spinosa (allthorn family)

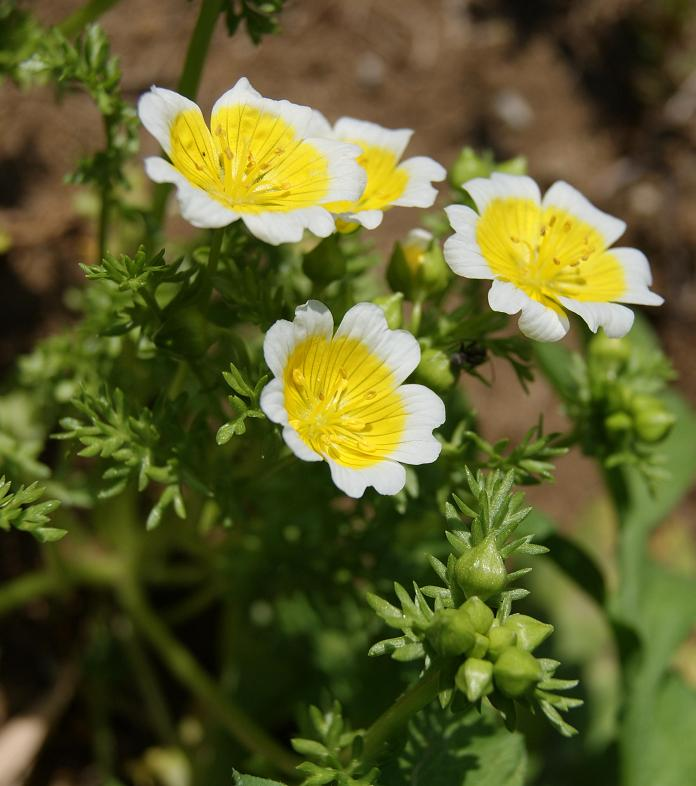
Limnanthes douglasii (meadowfoam family)

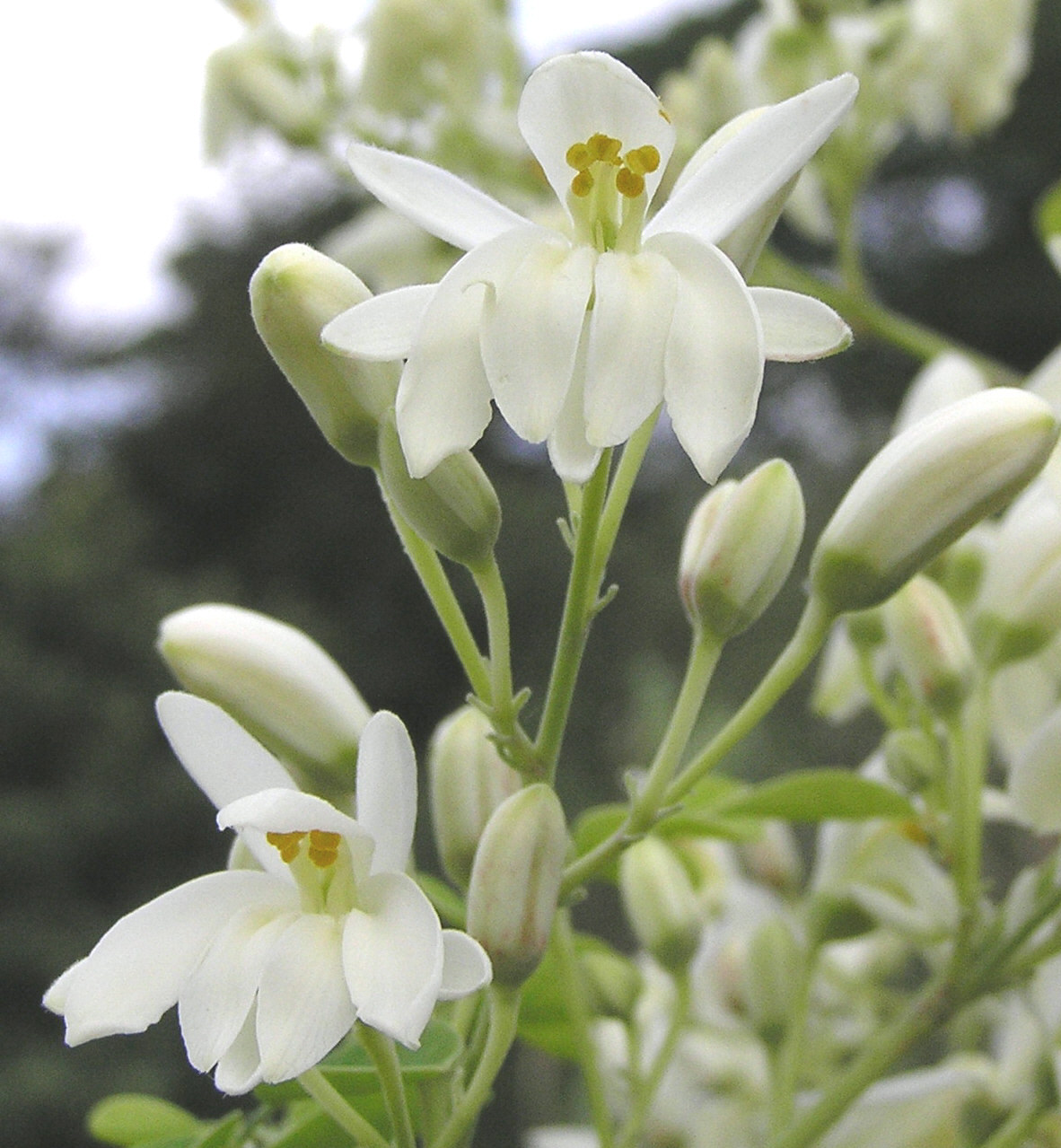
Moringa oleifera (horseradish-tree family)

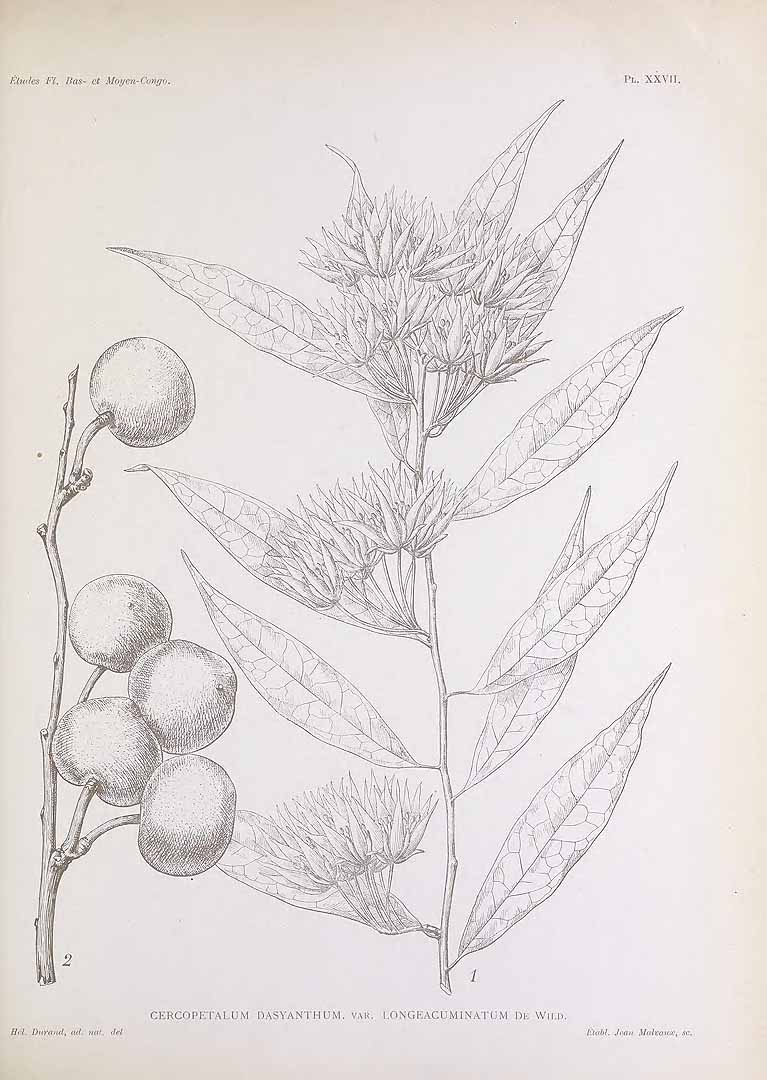
Pentadiplandra brazzeana (oubli family)

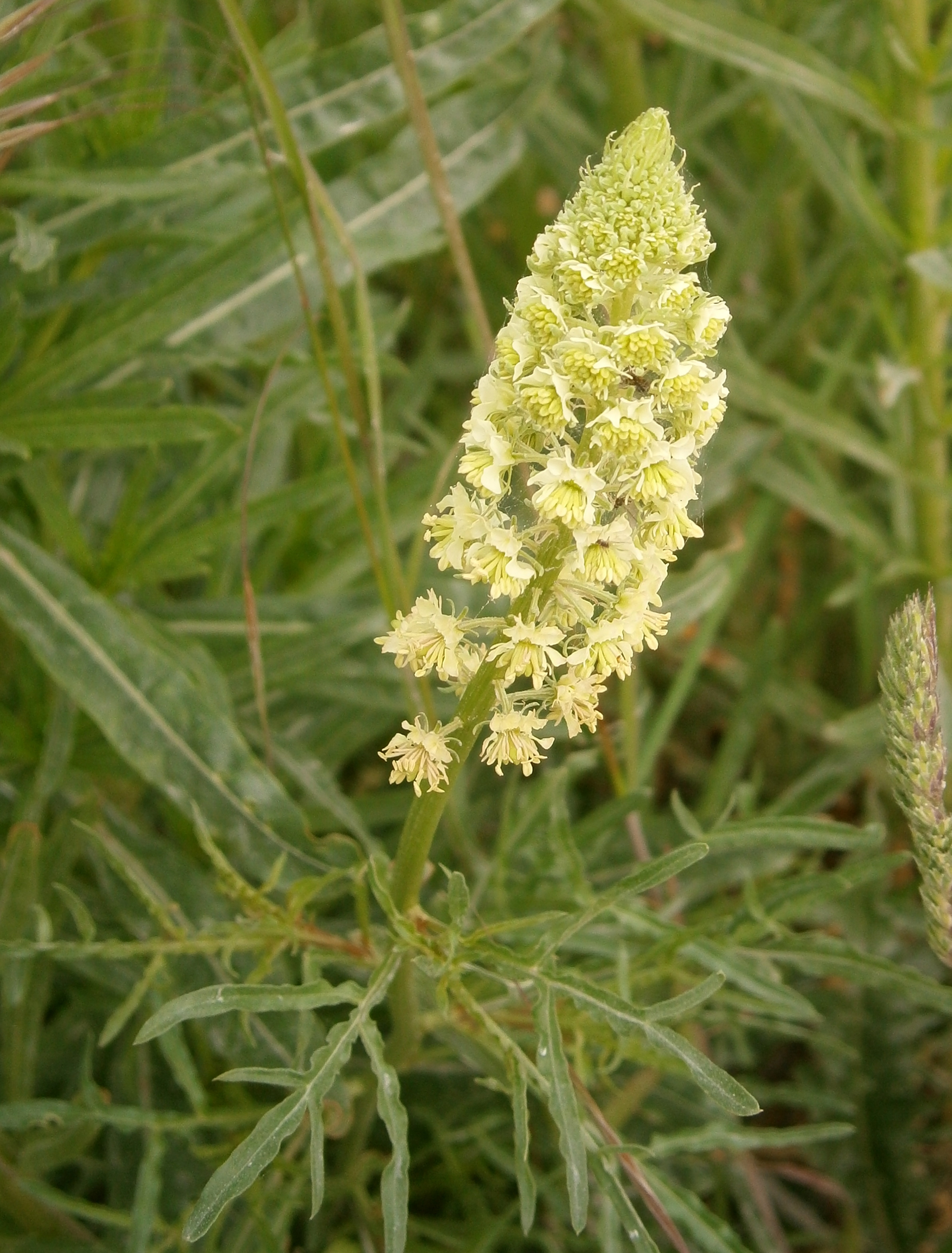
Reseda lutea (mignonette family)

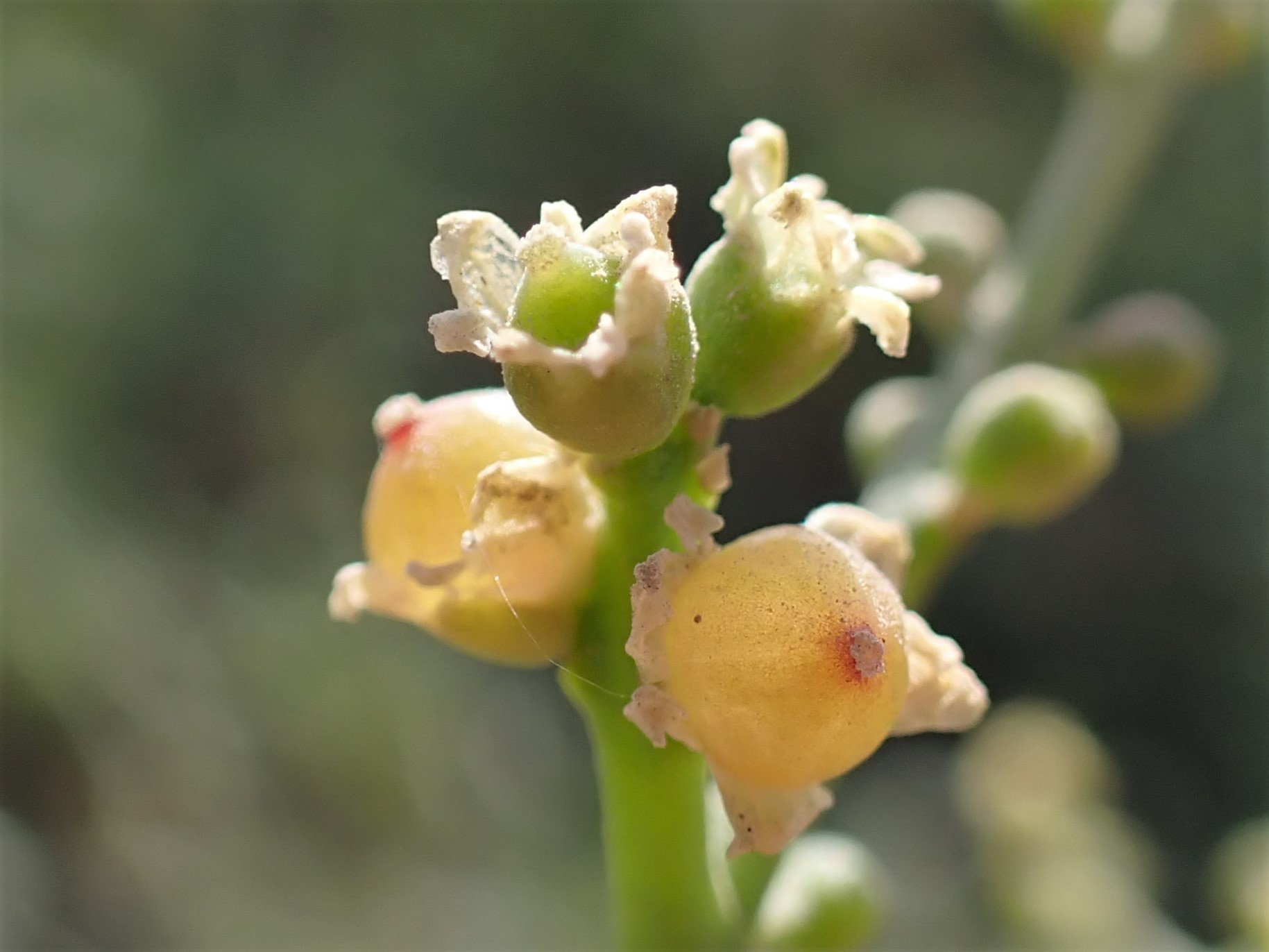
Salvadora persica (toothbrush-tree family)

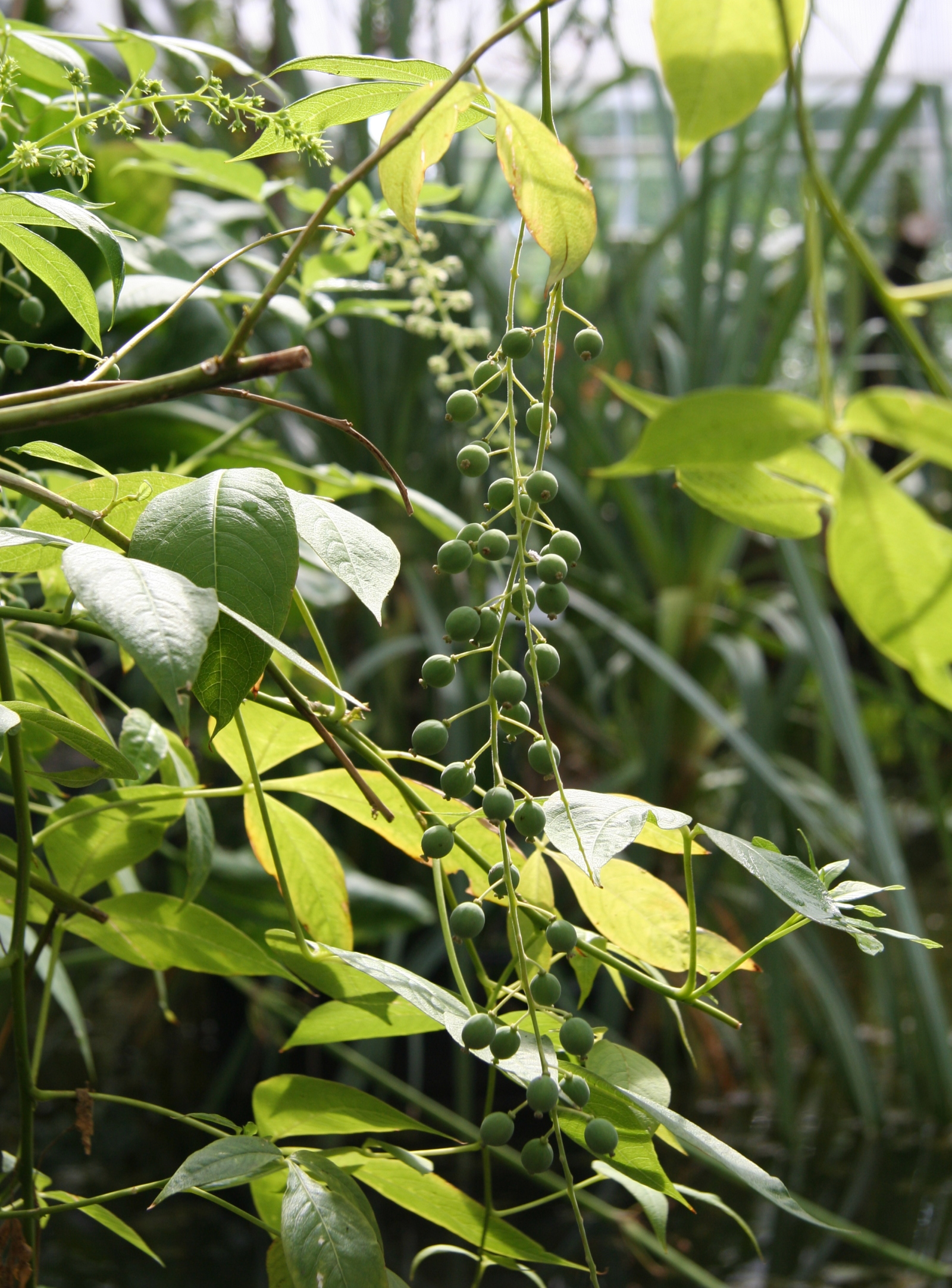
Tovaria pendula (stinkbush family)

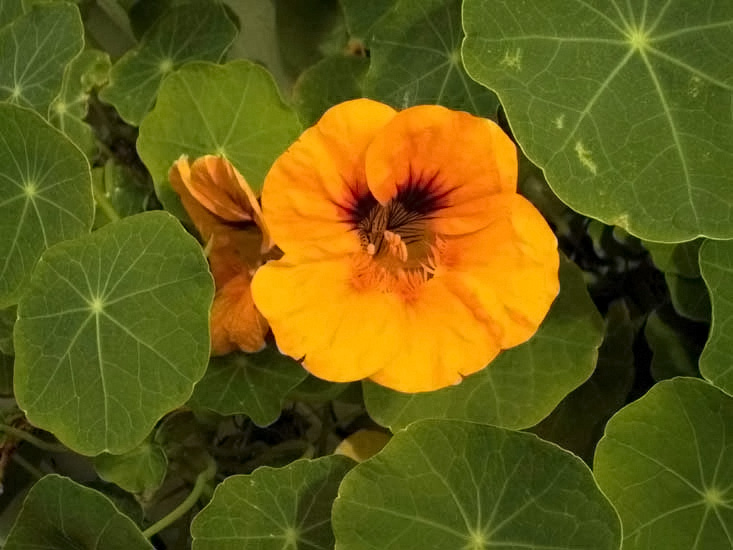
Tropaeolum majus (nasturtium family)

Setchellanthaceae is sometimes known as the azulita family.
