= Stack =

Stack may refer to:

== Places ==
- Stack Island, an island game reserve in Bass Strait, south-eastern Australia, in Tasmania’s Hunter Island Group
- Blue Stack Mountains, in Co. Donegal, Ireland

== People ==
- Stack (surname) (including a list of people with the name)
- Brian "Stack" Stevens (1941–2017), a Cornish rugby player
- Channing "Stacks" Lorenzo (born 1997), an American professional wrestler
- Parnell "Stacks" Edwards, a key associate in the Lufthansa heist
- Robert Stack Pierce (1933–2016), an American actor and baseball player

== Arts, entertainment, and media ==
- Stack (magazine), a bimonthly publication about high school sports
- Stacks (album), a 2005 album by Bernie Marsden
- Stacks, trailer parks that were made vertical, in the film Ready Player One
- Stack Ltd, the Japanese video game company that owns 0verflow
- Amp stack, of guitar amplifiers
- Library stack, compactly spaced bookshelves in libraries

== Science and technology ==
=== Computing ===
- Stack (abstract data type), abstract data type and data structure based on the principle of last in first out
  - Call stack, stack data structure that stores information about the active subroutines of a computer program
  - Stack machine, an architecture centered around a pushdown stack
  - Stack-based memory allocation, a memory allocation scheme based on the principle of "last in, first out"
- A multi-layer architecture:
  - Protocol stack, a particular software implementation of a computer networking protocol suite
  - Solution stack or tech stack, a group of software systems, increasing in abstraction from bottom to top
- Apple product features:
  - Stack in Macintosh, one of a collection of documents created with HyperCard (as in a stack of virtual cards)
  - Stacks (Mac OS), a folder view on the Dock of macOS
- Stack (Haskell), a tool to build Haskell projects and manage their dependencies
- Stack in LiveCode, one of a collection of program scripts created with LiveCode's Transcript programming language
- Stacks blockchain, a Bitcoin smart contract platform
- The stack (philosophy), a political and design theory of planetary-scale computation coined by Benjamin H. Bratton

=== Mathematics ===
- Stack (mathematics), a sheaf that takes values in categories rather than sets
- Algebraic stack, a special kind of stack commonly used in algebraic geometry
  - Stacks Project, an open source collaborative mathematics textbook writing project

=== Other uses in science and technology ===
- Stack (geology), a large vertical column of rock in the sea
- Stacking (chemistry), or pi stacking, attractive, noncovalent interactions between aromatic rings
- Yellow stackhousia, a plant
- Stack (microelectronics), a two-layer gate insulator in MOSFET, usually high-κ-oxide over SiO_{2}

== Transportation ==
- Stack, an assembled multistage rocket
- Operation Stack, parking lorries on the M20 in Kent, England, when Channel crossings are disrupted
- Stack interchange, a free-flowing grade-separated junction between two roads
- The Stack, the interchange of I-10 and I-17 in Phoenix, Arizona

== Other uses ==
- Stack (unit), a US unit of volume for stacked firewood
- Smoke stack or chimney
  - Flue-gas stack, the industrial terminology for an industrial plant chimney
  - Funnel (ship), the smokestack or chimney on a ship
  - Stack effect, the movement of air into and out of buildings, chimneys, flue-gas stacks, or other containers

== See also ==
- Stacker (disambiguation)
- Stacking (disambiguation)
- Haystack (disambiguation)
- Stak (disambiguation)
- Stax (disambiguation)
- Pile (disambiguation)
