= Haystack (disambiguation) =

A haystack is a stack of hay.

Haystack or Haystacks may also refer to:

== People ==
- Haystak (born 1973), American rapper
- Haystacks Calhoun (William Calhoun; 1934–1989), American professional wrestler
- Giant Haystacks (Martin Ruane; 1946–1998), British professional wrestler

== Places ==
=== Australia ===
- Haystack, Queensland
- Haystack Island, an island in South Australia

=== Canada ===
- Haystack, Newfoundland and Labrador

=== United Kingdom ===
- Haystacks (Lake District), a mountain in England

=== United States ===
- Haystack, New Mexico, a census-designated place
- Haystack Observatory, a group of radio-telescope astronomical observatories in Massachusetts
- Haystack Rock, a formation just off the coast at Cannon Beach, Oregon
- Hayward, California, nicknamed Haystack
- The Haystacks, enigmatic sandstone mounds in Loyalsock Creek, Sullivan County, Pennsylvania

== Science and technology ==
- Haystack (MIT project), a personal information management/semantic web research software project
- Haystack (software), a network traffic obfuscator and encryptor
- deepset Haystack, an open source Python framework for building LLM applications

== Other ==
- Haystack (food), an American dish
- Haystacks: Autumn, a c. 1874 painting by Jean-François Millet
- Haystacks (Monet series), a series of Impressionist paintings by Claude Monet
- Haystack Prayer Meeting, which led to the development of American Protestant missions in the 19th century
- Mogote, a haystack-shaped, erosional, geomorphic structure

== See also ==
- Haystack Mountain (disambiguation)
