= Piling (disambiguation) =

A piling is a vertical structural element of a deep foundation, driven or drilled deep into the ground at the building site.

Piling may also refer to:

- Stacking, placing items atop one another
  - Disordered piling, a Japanese wallbuilding technique
- Piling (毗陵), a former name of Changzhou, Jiangsu Province, China
- Chinese Piling paintings, the Pi-Ling style of art
- Piling Bay, Nunavut, Canada

== See also ==
- Piling-up lemma
- Pressure piling, piling up of pressure
- Pile (disambiguation)
- Pilling (disambiguation)
