= Stacking =

Stacking may refer to:

== Arts and media ==
- Stacking (video game), a 2011 game from Double Fine
- Stacking, a 1987 TV movie directed and produced by Martin Rosen
- Stacking, a technique in broadcast programming

== Language ==
- Consonant stacking, a feature of some South Asian writing systems
- Verb stacking, a grammatical phenomenon involving concatenation of verbs

== Science and technology ==
- Stacking (chemistry), an attractive, noncovalent interaction between aromatic rings
- Focus stacking, an image processing technique in photography
- Image stacking, a form of speckle imaging
- Block-stacking problem, a puzzle in statics
- Stacking, a technique used in reflection seismology
- Stacking, a type of ensemble learning in machine learning
- Stacking, the assembly of a multistage rocket

== Sport ==
- Stacking, a strategy used in the sport of pickleball
- Dice stacking, a performance art involving dice
- Racial stacking, a concept relating to positional segregation in sports
- Sport stacking, played using plastic cups
- Stacking guard pass, a technique in grappling

== Other uses ==
- Stacking, a gang signal made with the hands
- Stacking, a phenomenon where amusement ride vehicles stop and "pile up" due to the track ahead being occupied

== See also ==
- Sphere packing
- Stack (disambiguation)
- Stacker (disambiguation)
- piling (disambiguation)
