= USU Eastern Prehistoric Museum =

Natural history museum in Price, Utah

Coordinates: 39°35′58.5″N 110°48′29″W

Prehistoric Museum, USU-Eastern
- Former name: College of Eastern Utah Prehistoric Museum
- Established: 1961
- Location: Price, Utah
- Type: Science, Natural History
- Directors: Timothy Riley, Ph.D.
- Website: Official website

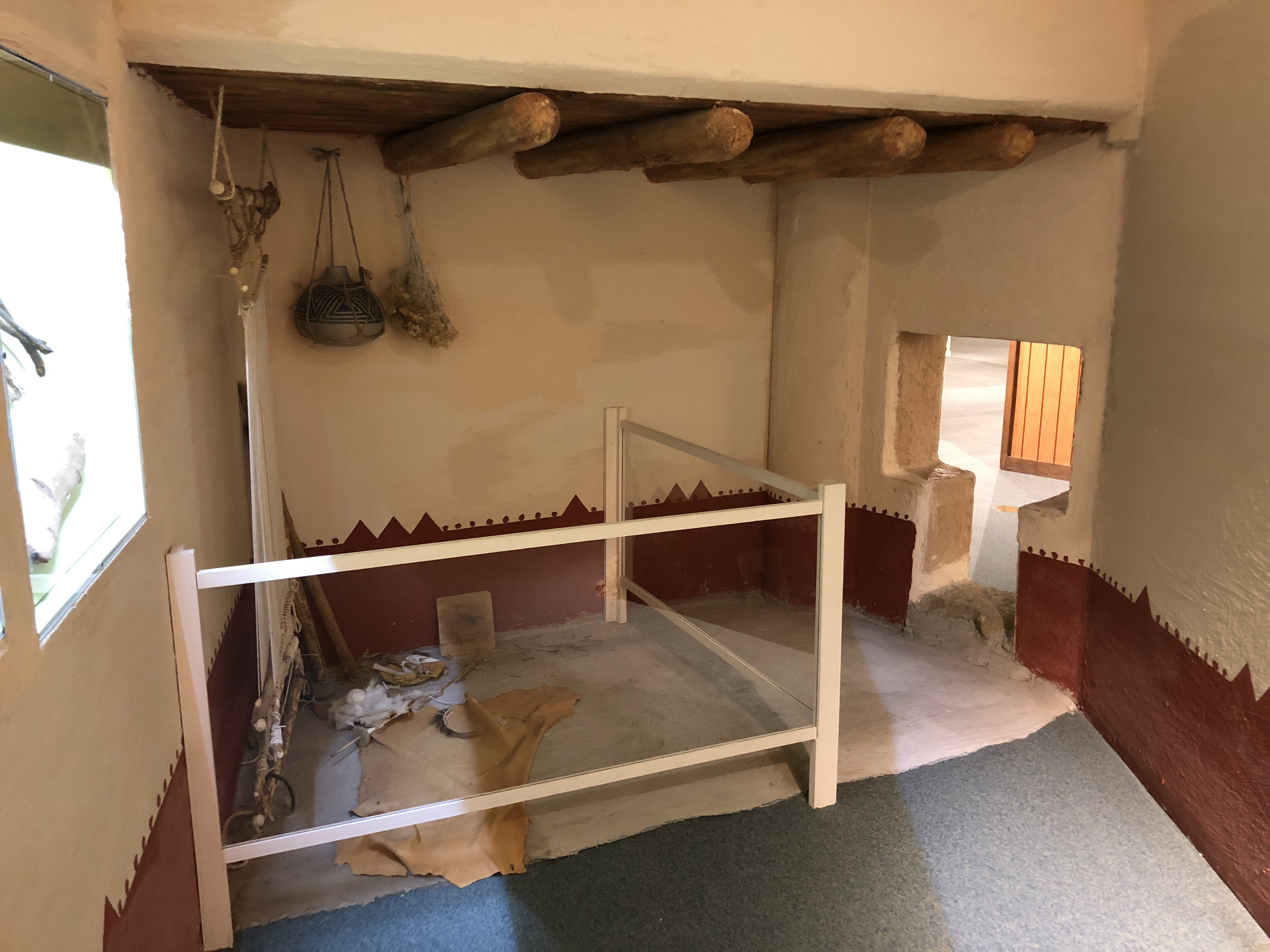
Reconstruction of an "apartment" of the Blanding cliff-dwelling.

The Prehistoric Museum, USU-Eastern, formerly known as the College of Eastern Utah Prehistoric Museum, is a museum accredited by the American Alliance of Museums located in Price, Utah. The museum seeks to promote public understanding of prehistory through interpretive exhibits, educational programs, collections, and research. The museum is located near many paleontological and archaeological sites in a region known as Castle Country, notably in the San Rafael Swell and nearby canyons throughout the Book Cliffs area such as Nine Mile Canyon and Range Creek Canyon.

== History ==
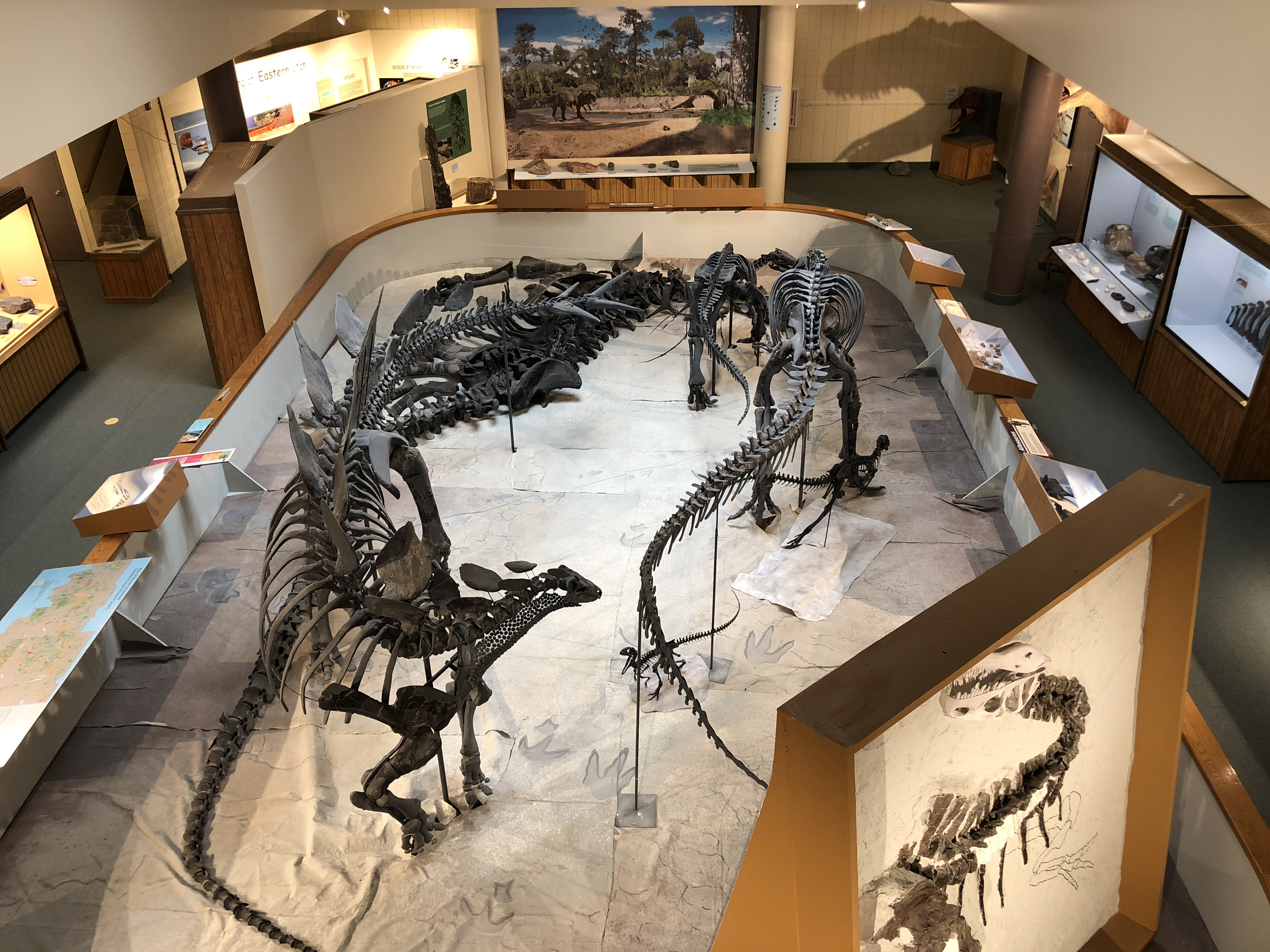
Skeletons in the Dinosaur Pit.

The Prehistoric Museum was established in 1961 as a cooperative effort by the former College of Eastern Utah and the community of Price. On May 8, 1961, the Board of Regents established the museum. At that time, funding for the museum was supplied by the geology department at the college. The museum officially opened to the public on June 3, 1961, on the second floor of the Price Municipal Building in a small converted conference room. After expanding into the hallways of the City Hall, it moved into the old city gymnasium in 1971.

In later years, the museum became an appropriated line item through the State of Utah. In 1990-91, the appropriation for the museum was greatly increased because of the tremendous expansion of the museum. A new addition was opened, later to become the Hall of Dinosaurs. Through these two separate expansions during its 45-year history, the museum has become a 25,000-square-foot (2,300 m^{2}) facility with another 6,000-square-foot (560 m^{2}) repository and paleontology preparation laboratory.

An ongoing program of paleontology fieldwork and excavation which begun in 1990 has produced 12 new species of dinosaurs and over 7,000 paleontologic specimens. Federal and state accreditation followed in 1991, allowing the museum to reposit collections from across Utah. Renewed interest in dinosaurs and a popular culture boom brought thousands more visitors down the Dinosaur Diamond Scenic Byway and to the museum in the 1990s.

New development in Utah and the renaissance in dinosaur research has resulted in new finds and an increased level of interest in the museum. The museum now serves as an important repository housing over 750,000 prehistoric specimens from around the state.

== Features ==
The museum's national accreditation by the American Alliance of Museums distinguishes it as fewer than 10% of museums are awarded such accreditation. As a state and federal repository for both paleontological and archaeological collections, the museum's holdings include more than 700,000 archaeological artifacts, comprising one of the largest and most significant collections in the country. Many of these artifacts, such as those left by the indigenous Fremont people, have become world-renowned. The museum's paleontological collection includes type specimens and fossil finds new to science.

The collections and exhibits focus on specimens indigenous to the region and include:

- Fremont culture exhibits, such as rock art reproductions and the famous Pilling Figurines
- Comprehensive display of Utah's Ice Age ecology and Paleoindian presence
- The Huntington Mammoth, best-known and one of the best-kept of all fossil elephants
- Utahraptor and a dozen other new dinosaurs, several percent of the known global diversity

== Exhibitions ==
Exhibitions at the museum have included:

- The emphasis of the exhibitry is the prehistory of eastern Utah. There are two galleries, one that features paleontology and geology, and the other that features archaeology. Both galleries utilize fossils and artifacts from the region.
- The Other Side of Utah - an annual exhibit that opened in 2006, it presents art that reflects the Utah area.
- Rock art exhibit - including a restored pictograph panel from Horseshoe Canyon in Canyonlands National Park.

== See also ==
- Cleveland-Lloyd Dinosaur Quarry — Specimens collected from this site are on display at the USU Eastern Prehistoric Museum
