= Superstack =

Superstack may refer to:

- Inco Superstack, in Sudbury, Ontario, the tallest chimney in Canada
- SuperStack, a series of network switches by 3Com
- Superstack, a poker tournament at, for example, the 2024 World Series of Poker Online
- SuperStack scheduling initiative, in the South African Rugby Challenge

== See also ==
- Stack (disambiguation)
- Superstock TT, a motorcycle road race
