= Hawaiian haystack =

Chicken dish from Western United States

A Hawaiian haystack (also known as a "chicken sundae" or "snow on the mountain") is a type of haystack. It is not Hawaiian. It is a convenience cuisine dish composed of a rice base and several toppings. It is prepared by topping rice with chicken, chicken gravy, diced pineapple, diced tomatoes, Chinese noodles, cheese, celery, and coconut. Traditionally, each topping is prepared in its own dish and presented buffet-style, then added on top of the rice as desired.

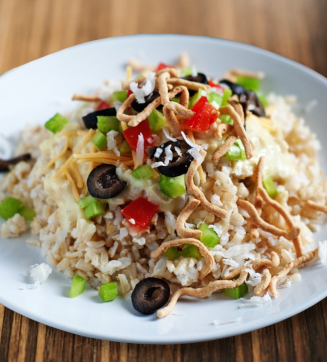
Hawaiian haystack example before serving.

It is popular in the Western United States both as a school lunch and as a quick meal for family dinners.

== Etymology ==
The dish did not originate in Hawaii, but derives its name from the Hawaiian character of staple ingredients such as coconut.

== See also ==
- List of chicken dishes
