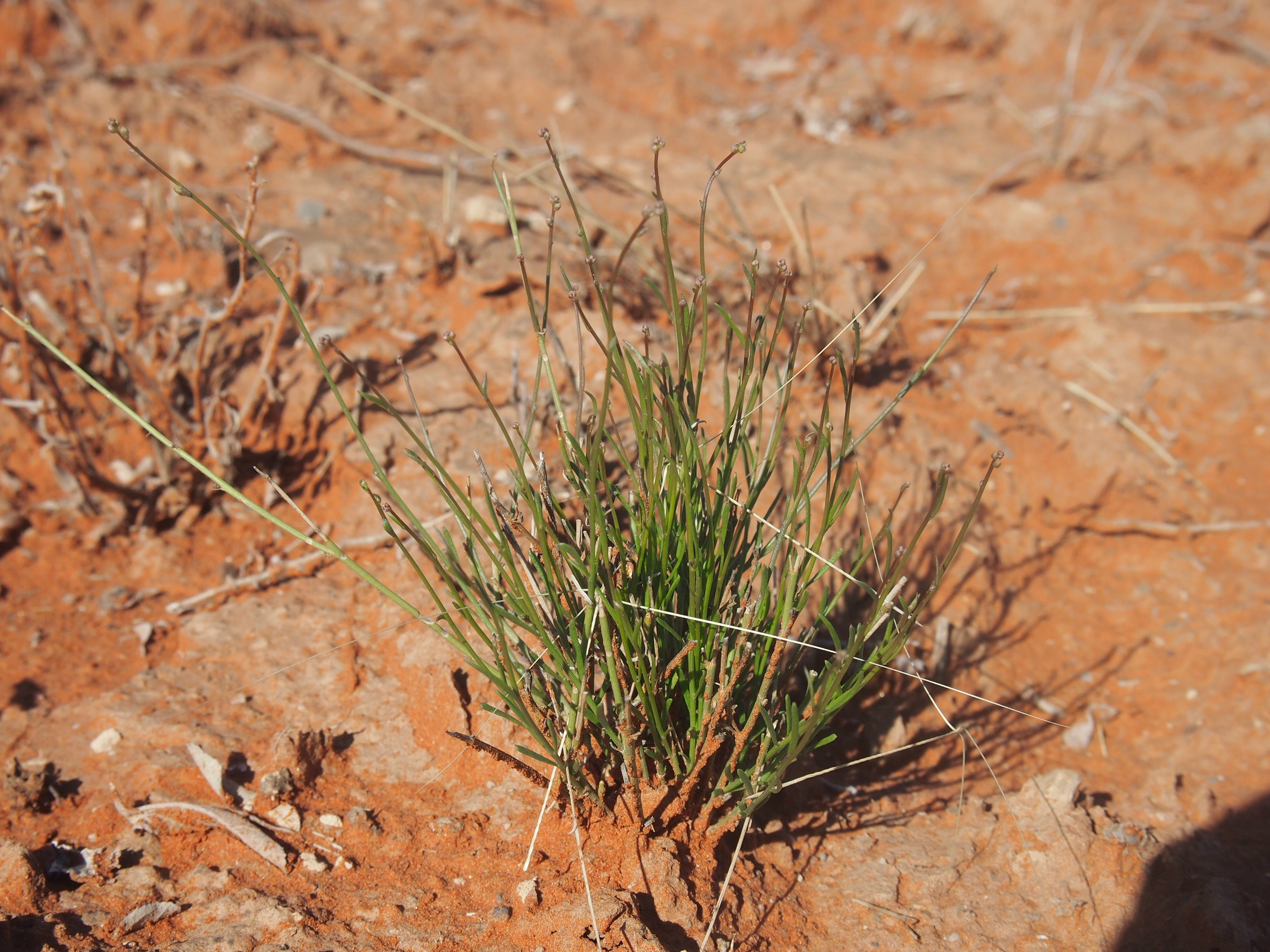

Conservation status
- Priority Three — Poorly Known Taxa (DEC)
- Endangered (NSWBCA)

Scientific classification
- Kingdom: Plantae
- Clade: Tracheophytes
- Clade: Angiosperms
- Clade: Eudicots
- Clade: Rosids
- Order: Celastrales
- Family: Celastraceae
- Genus: Stackhousia
- Species: S. clementii

Binomial name
- Stackhousia clementii Domin
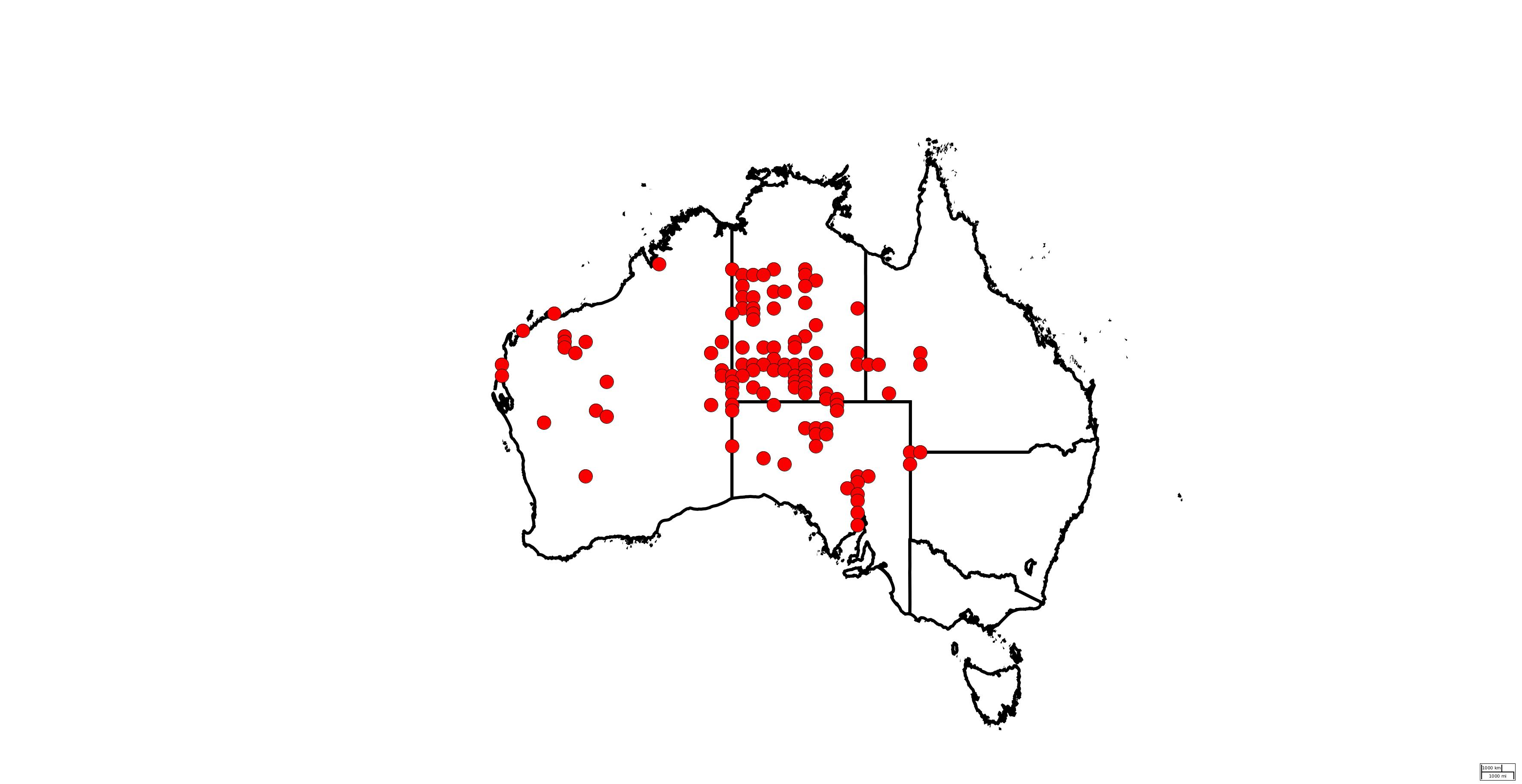
- Atlas of Living Australia Occurrence Records

= Stackhousia clementii =

Species of herb

Stackhousia clementii is a species of plant in the family Celastraceae and is native to Australia.

The dense perennial forb typically grows to a height of 0.45 metres (1.5 ft) and produces yellow-green-brown flowers.

Stackhousia clementii is sometimes referred to by its common name of Limestone Candles.

== Habitat ==
The species has a disjunct range across arid western and central Australia, with occurrence records in Western Australia, South Australia, the Northern Territory, New South Wales and Queensland.

In Western Australia it is found on sandstone hills scattered across the Kimberley, northern Goldfields-Esperance and Pilbara regions of Western Australia where it grows in skeletal soils.

In South Australia and New South Wales the species is frequently associated with limestone flats and ridges, where it grows in sand to cracking clay.

== Description ==
Dense, broom-like perennial forb that typically grows 18-50 cm high. Species is glabrous or puberulent at its base and has slender, hairless stems which are much branched in upper part. Upper leaves are usually scale-like, sometimes linear to narrowly elliptic and mostly 5-15 mm long.

Flowers are pale green, yellow or dark brown and borne in clusters of 1-3 in cylindrical spikes. Petals are loosely joined into a slender tube 2.4-3.2 mm long, with 5 lobes at the top. Ovate, shallowly erose to denticulate margin white bracts. Hypanthium is typically 0.5–1.5 mm long and sepals are 0.6–0.9 mm long, yellow to greenish-yellow and shallowly erose. Corolla are pale green, yellow or dark brown with tube 2.4–3.2 mm long and lobes 1–1.6 mm long and acute. Gynoecium 3-partite.

Cocci usually 1, broadly obovoid to obpyriform-obovoid, curved towards axis, 2–3.3 mm long, rugose, sometimes obtusely tuberculate over distal two-thirds; basal cavity shallow to deep with thin rim extending distally exposing tongue of bony endocarp.

== Ecology ==
Stackhousia clementii has been recorded in open woodland, arid shrubland and hummock grassland on ephemeral swamp margins, plains and ridges, and sometimes in saline soil.

A flowering time has not been consistently recorded; however, a fruiting specimen was collected in New South Wales in August.

Disturbance regimes are not known for Stackhousia clementii.

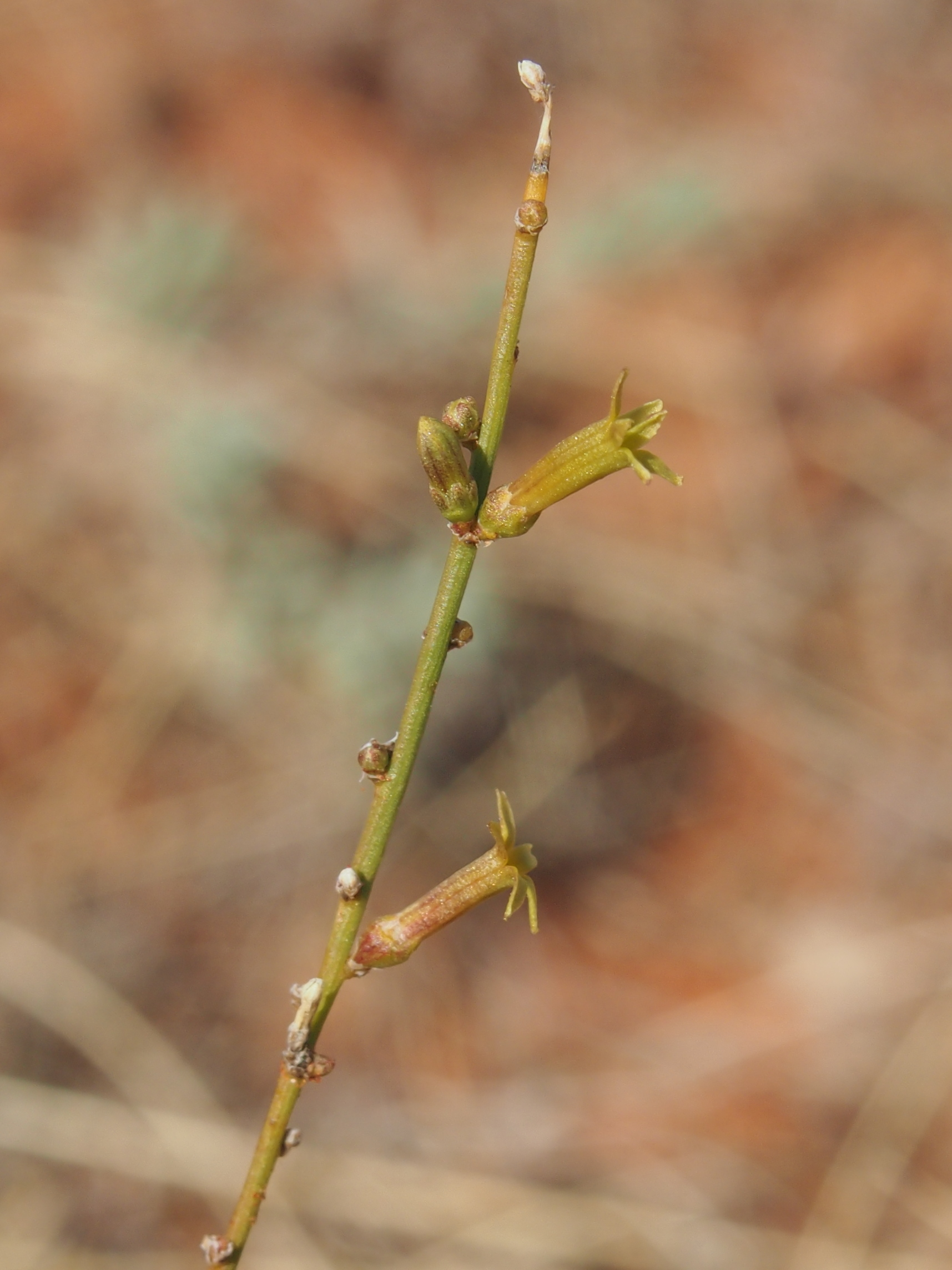
Stackhousia clementii flowers

Stackhousia clementii is known or predicted to occur in the Interim Biogeographic Regionalisation of Australia Regions of the Simpson Strzelecki Dunefields, Channel Country, Mitchell Grass Downs, Eyre Yorke Block, Gawler, Tanami, Finke, MacDonnell Ranges, Burt Plain, Great Victoria Desert, Stony Plains, Sturt Plateau, Davenport Murchison Ranges, Carnarvon, Central Ranges, Great Sandy Desert, Murchison and Pilbara.

== Conservation ==
The species is not listed for conservation under the Environment Protection and Biodiversity Conservation Act 1999 (Cth).

The species is listed in Western Australia under the Biodiversity Conservation Act 2016 (WA) as a 'Priority 3' poorly known flora species, meaning it may possibly be threatened but it does not meet survey criteria, or is otherwise data deficient. It is included as a priority for survey and evaluation of conservation status so that consideration can be given to its declaration as threatened flora.

The species is listed as 'Endangered' in New South Wales under the Biodiversity Conservation Act 2016 (NSW). A targeted strategy for managing Stackhousia clementii has been developed under the New South Wales Government’s Saving Our Species program due to less than 10% of the species population occurring in NSW and its persistence in the wild in NSW is therefore dependent on conservation actions.

Key threats to the species include a lack of available ecological information, habitat depletion, and grazing of stock and native herbivores (other Stackhousia species are eaten by stock). Activities to assist the conservation of this species include further surveys, protection of existing populations from stock and other grazing animals, no further loss of extant populations and the investigation of regeneration including seed-set, germination and seedling survival.

== Taxonomy ==
The description by Karel Domin was published in Beitrage zur Flora und Pflanzengeographie Australiens, Bibliotheca Botanica 22(89) in 1927.
