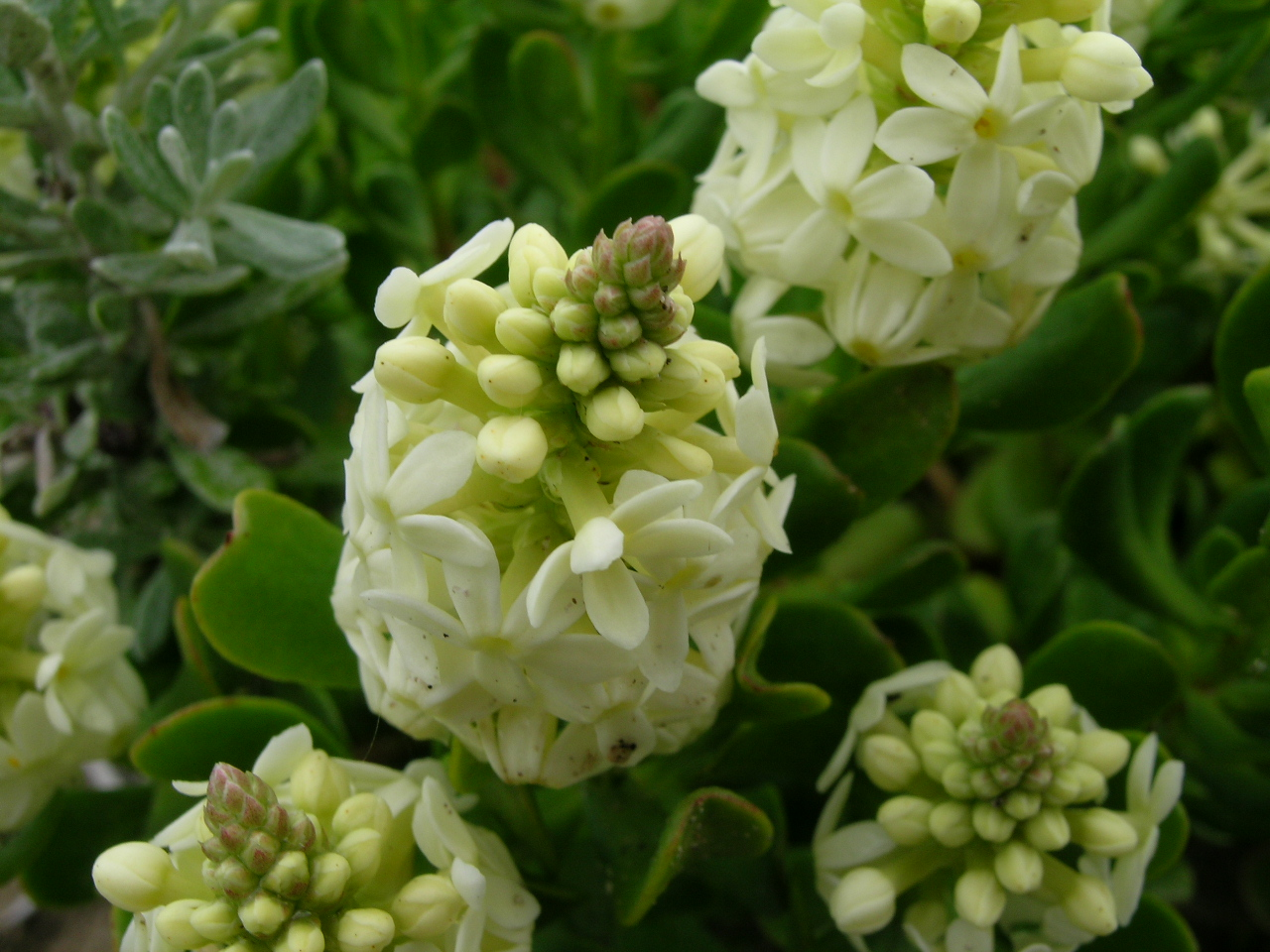

Scientific classification
- Kingdom: Plantae
- Clade: Tracheophytes
- Clade: Angiosperms
- Clade: Eudicots
- Clade: Rosids
- Order: Celastrales
- Family: Celastraceae
- Genus: Stackhousia
- Species: S. spathulata

Binomial name
- Stackhousia spathulata Sieber ex Spreng.

Synonyms
- Stackhousia cuneata A.Cunn. ex Hook.f.; Stackhousia maculata Sieber ex Hook.f.; Stackhousia spathulata f. genuina Pamp.; Stackhousia spathulata f. maculata (Sieber ex Hook.f.) Pamp.; Stackhousia spathulata f. obcordata Pamp.; Tripterococcus spathulatus (Sieber ex Spreng.) F.Muell. ex Schuch.

= Stackhousia spathulata =

Coast Stackhousia

Species of plant

Stackhousia spathulata, the coast Stackhousia is a species of plant in the family Celastraceae. A widespread small plant, found in heath and dry sclerophyll forest in sandy areas, often near beaches or lagoons in southeastern Australia. Growing to 50 cm tall. The specific epithet refers to the spoon shaped leaves.
