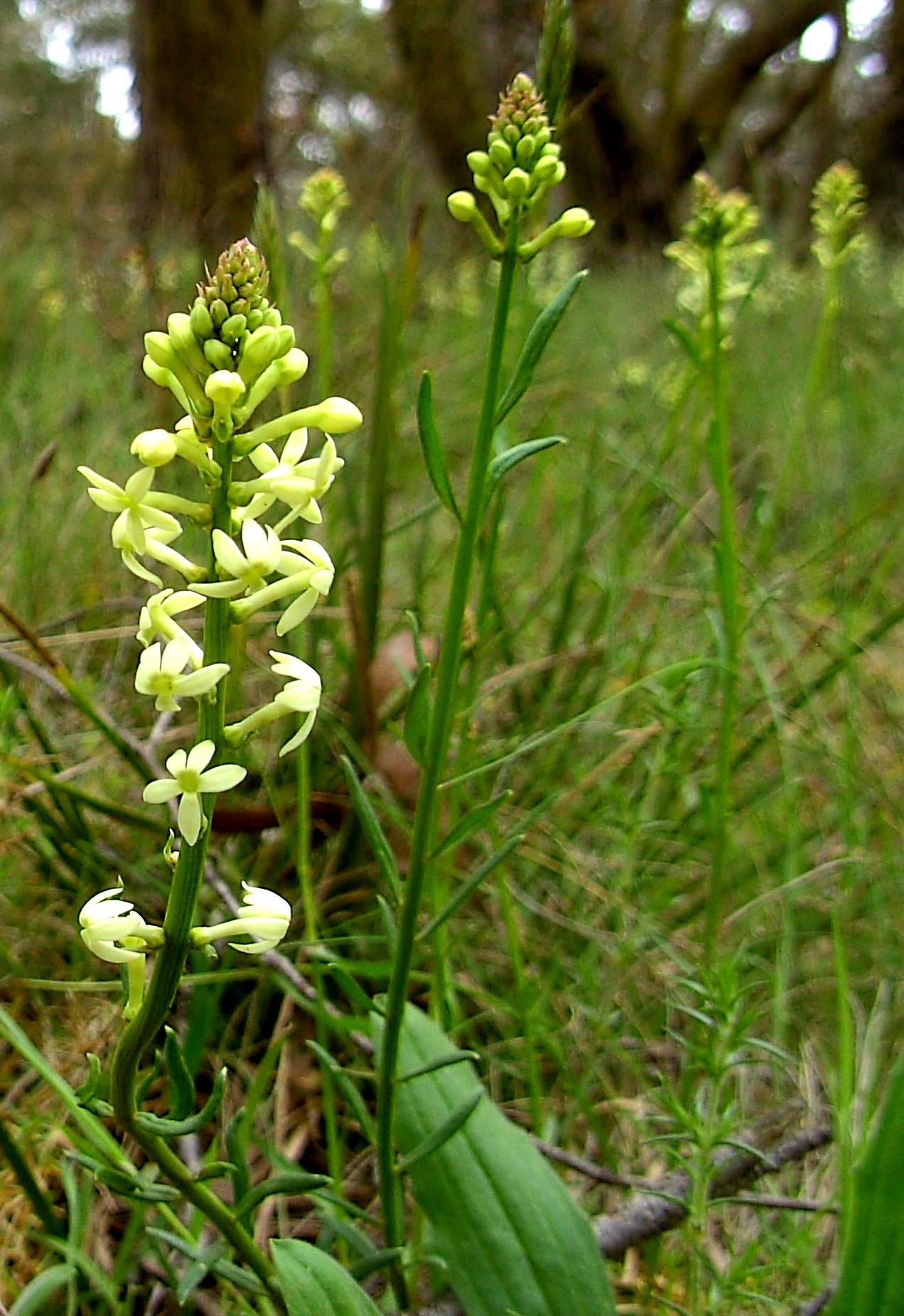
- Stackhousia monogyna

Scientific classification
- Kingdom: Plantae
- Clade: Tracheophytes
- Clade: Angiosperms
- Clade: Eudicots
- Clade: Rosids
- Order: Celastrales
- Family: Celastraceae
- Genus: Stackhousia; Sm.

Species
- See text

Synonyms
- Plokiostigma Schuch.

= Stackhousia =

Genus of flowering plants

Stackhousia is a genus of annual and perennial plants in the family Celastraceae that are native to Australia, New Zealand, Malesia and Micronesia. The genus was first described by James Edward Smith in Transactions of the Linnean Society of London in 1798.

It was formerly placed in Stackhousiaceae, but under the APG II system this family has been folded into Celastraceae.

== Species ==
20 species are accepted.

- Stackhousia annua W.R.Barker
- Stackhousia aspericocca Schuch.
- Stackhousia clementii Domin
- Stackhousia dielsii Pamp. – yellow stackhousia
- Stackhousia georgei Diels
- Stackhousia huegelii Endl.
- Stackhousia intermedia F.M.Bailey
- Stackhousia megaloptera F.Muell.
- Stackhousia minima Hook.f.
- Stackhousia monogyna Labill. – Creamy candles, creamy stackhousia
- Stackhousia muricata Lindl.
- Stackhousia nuda Lindl.
- Stackhousia pubescens A.Rich. – downy stackhousia
- Stackhousia pulvinaris F.Muell. – alpine stackhousia
- Stackhousia scoparia Benth.
- Stackhousia spathulata Sieber ex Spreng.
- Stackhousia stratfordiae W.R.Barker & Cockerton
- Stackhousia subterranea W.R.Barker – Gunn's mignonette, grasslands candles
- Stackhousia umbellata C.A.Gardner & A.S.George
- Stackhousia viminea Sm. – Slender stackhousia
