= Stackhousia huegelii =

Scientific classification
- Kingdom: Plantae
- Clade: Tracheophytes
- Clade: Angiosperms
- Clade: Eudicots
- Clade: Rosids
- Order: Celastrales
- Family: Celastraceae
- Genus: Stackhousia
- Species: S. huegelii

Binomial name
- Stackhousia huegelii Endl.

Species of flowering plant

Stackhousia huegelii is a species of perennial flowering plant in the family Celastraceae.

The species is found from the Mid West and along the coast to the Great Southern region of Western Australia.
