= Stackhousia subterranea =

Gunn's mignonette

Scientific classification
- Kingdom: Plantae
- Clade: Tracheophytes
- Clade: Angiosperms
- Clade: Eudicots
- Clade: Rosids
- Order: Celastrales
- Family: Celastraceae
- Genus: Stackhousia
- Species: S. subterranea

Binomial name
- Stackhousia subterranea W.R.Barker

Synonyms
- Stackhousia aff. monogyna (Western Plains); Stackhousia gunnii Hook.f. nom. illeg.; Stackhousia sp. Midlands (D.I.Morris 86361) Duretto; Stackhousia sp. 1

Species of plant

Stackhousia subterranea (Gunn's Mignonette or Grasslands Candles) is a perennial herb species in the family Celastraceae. The species occurs in South Australia and Victoria and Tasmania
