= Pilling (disambiguation) =

Pilling is a village and civil parish in Lancashire, England. It can also refer to:

- Textile pilling, a surface defect of textiles characterized by small balls of fibres that form on a piece of cloth
- Pilling's Pond, privately owned urban waterfowl reserve and breeding ground in Licton Springs, Seattle, Washington

People

- Andy Pilling (born 1969), English footballer
- Ann Pilling (born 1944), English author and poet
- Barney Pilling, British television and film editor
- Clarence Pilling, discoverer of Pilling Figurines, a set of eleven clay figurines made by the Fremont culture
- Dick Pilling (1855–1891), English cricketer
- Donald L. Pilling (1943–2008), four-star United States Navy admiral
- Doral Pilling (1906–1982), Canadian athlete
- Harry Pilling (1943–2012), English cricketer
- James Pilling (1846–1895), American ethnologist
- Jonas Pilling (1855–1926), British priest
- Joseph Pilling (born 1945), British civil servant
- Mary Pilling (born 1938), English cricketer
