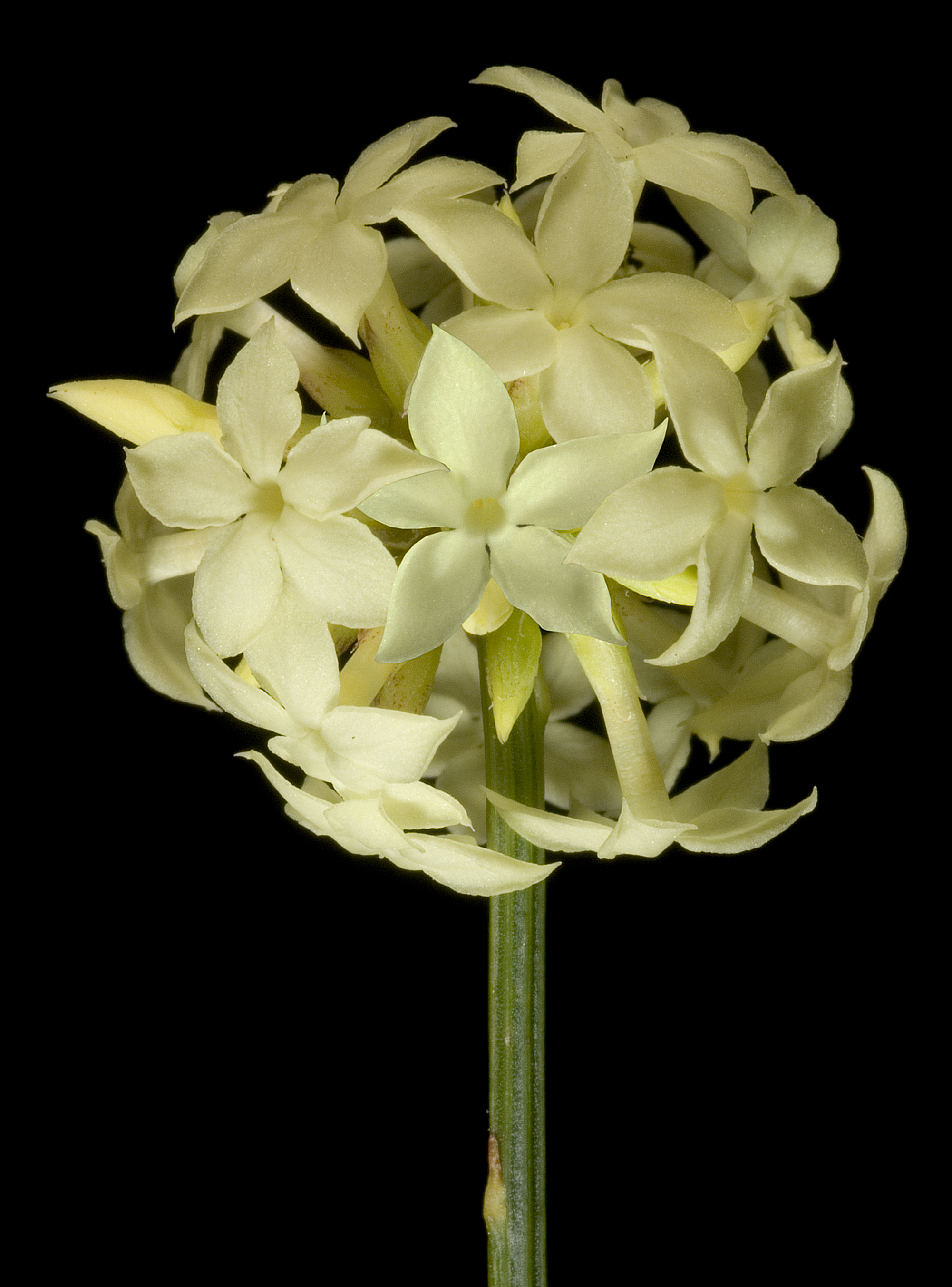

Conservation status
- Priority Three — Poorly Known Taxa (DEC)

Scientific classification
- Kingdom: Plantae
- Clade: Tracheophytes
- Clade: Angiosperms
- Clade: Eudicots
- Clade: Rosids
- Order: Celastrales
- Family: Celastraceae
- Genus: Stackhousia
- Species: S. umbellata

Binomial name
- Stackhousia umbellata C.A.Gardner & A.S.George

= Stackhousia umbellata =

Species of herb

Stackhousia umbellata is a species of plant in the family Celastraceae.

The perennial herb has a spreading habit and typically grows to a height of 0.7 metres (2 ft). It blooms between May and August producing yellow flowers.

The species is found in a small area along the coast around Ningaloo in the Gascoyne region of Western Australia where it grows in sandy soils over limestone.
