= Stak =

Stak may mean:

- Stok, a museum and gompa in Ladakh in north India
- Stak, a valley in Gilgit-Baltistan Pakistan.
- An exclamation commonly used by Norts in the Rogue Trooper fictional scenario
- Stakataka, a Pokémon introduced in Generation VII

== See also ==
- Stack (disambiguation)
