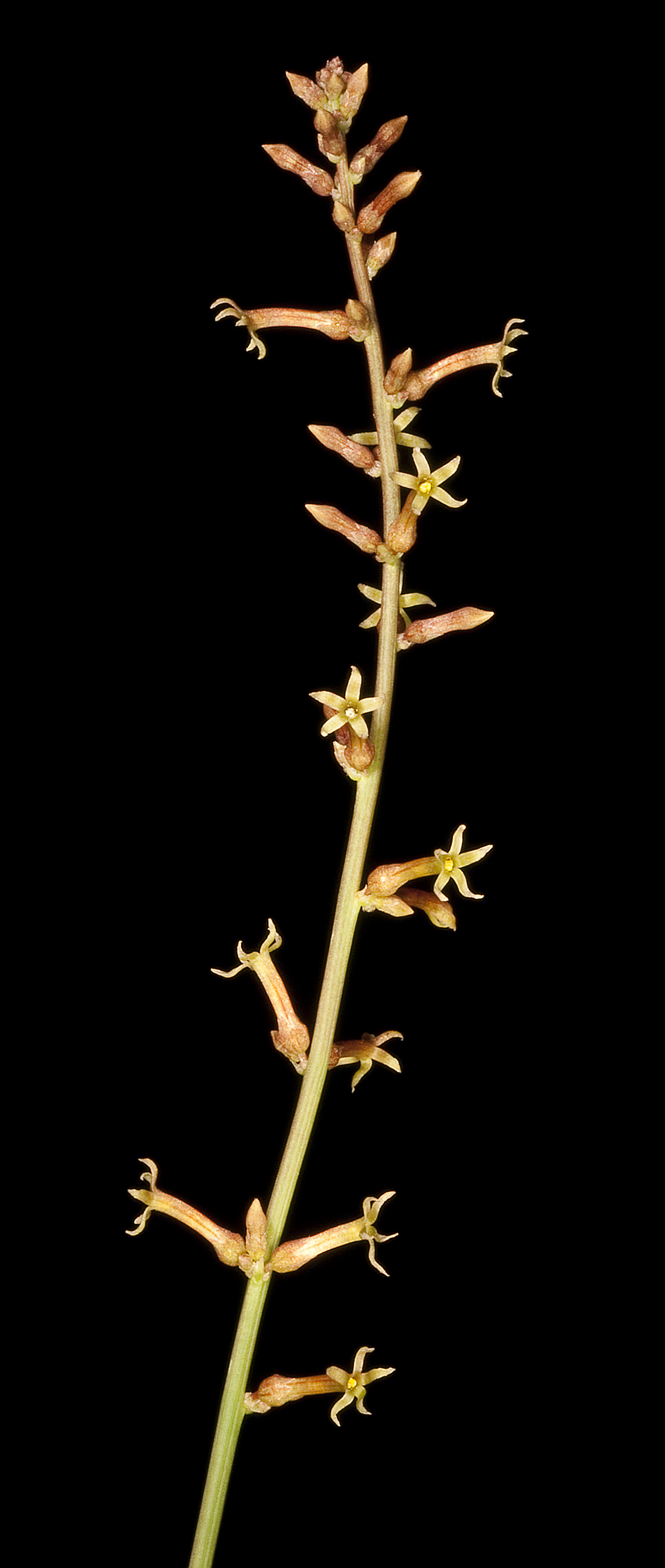

Scientific classification
- Kingdom: Plantae
- Clade: Tracheophytes
- Clade: Angiosperms
- Clade: Eudicots
- Clade: Rosids
- Order: Celastrales
- Family: Celastraceae
- Genus: Stackhousia
- Species: S. muricata

Binomial name
- Stackhousia muricata Lindl.

Synonyms
- Stackhousia elata F.Muell.; Stackhousia linarioides Hügel ex Pamp. & Barg.-Petr.; Stackhousia micrantha (Benth.) Pamp.; Stackhousia muricata var. linarioides Pamp.; Stackhousia muricata var. typica Pamp.; Stackhousia occidentalis Domin; Stackhousia viminea var. elata (F.Muell.) Benth.; Stackhousia viminea f. elata (F.Muell.) Pamp.; Stackhousia viminea var. micrantha Benth.; Stackhousia viminea var. occidentalis Benth.; Stackhousia viminea f. occidentalis Pamp.

= Stackhousia muricata =

Species of herb

Stackhousia muricata is a species of plant in the family Celastraceae.

The annual or perennial herb typically grows to a height of 0.03 to 0.55 centimetres (0.01 to 0.22 in). It blooms between July and November producing yellow-green-brown flowers.

Stackhousia muricata is an Australian endemic, native to New South Wales, the Northern Territory, Queensland, South Australia, and Western Australia. In Western Australia it is found from the Pilbara through the Mid West and Goldfields-Esperance into the northern Great Southern regions.
