= Stackhousia stratfordiae =

Downy stackhousia

Conservation status
- Priority One — Poorly Known Taxa (DEC)

Scientific classification
- Kingdom: Plantae
- Clade: Tracheophytes
- Clade: Angiosperms
- Clade: Eudicots
- Clade: Rosids
- Order: Celastrales
- Family: Celastraceae
- Genus: Stackhousia
- Species: S. stratfordiae

Binomial name
- Stackhousia stratfordiae W.R.Barker & Cockerton

Species of flowering plant

Stackhousia stratfordiae is a species of plant in the family Celastraceae.

The species is found in a few scattered locations in the Goldfields-Esperance region of Western Australia.
