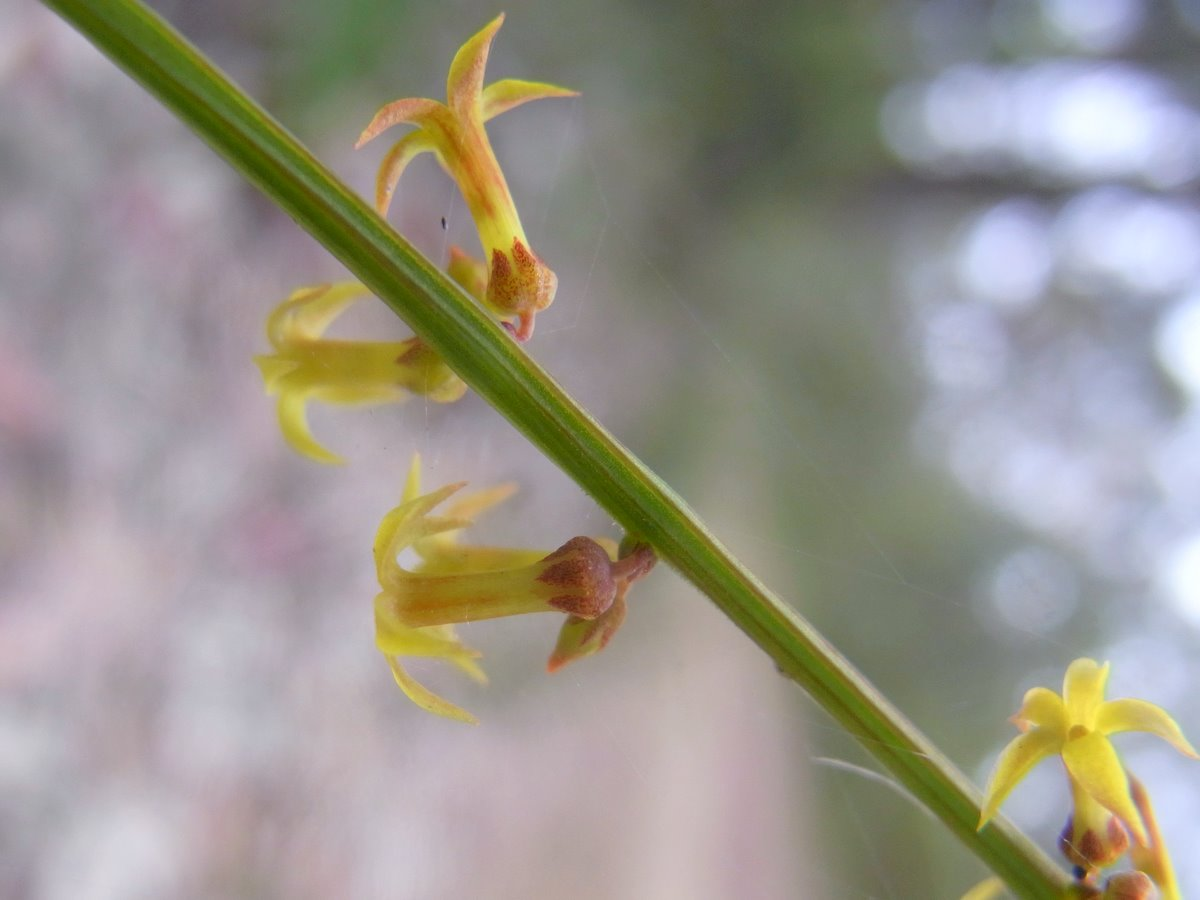
- Ku-ring-gai Chase National Park, Australia

Scientific classification
- Kingdom: Plantae
- Clade: Tracheophytes
- Clade: Angiosperms
- Clade: Eudicots
- Clade: Rosids
- Order: Celastrales
- Family: Celastraceae
- Genus: Stackhousia
- Species: S. viminea

Binomial name
- Stackhousia viminea Sm.

Synonyms
- Stackhousia doryopetala Schuch.; Stackhousia flava Hook.f.; Stackhousia viminea f. flava (Hook.f.) Pamp.; Stackhousia viminea f. genuina Pamp.

= Stackhousia viminea =

Slender Stackhousia

Species of plant

Stackhousia viminea, common name slender Stackhousia, is a common small species of flowering plant endemic to Australia. It grows to 70 cm tall. The habitat is heathland, pastures, eucalyptus woodland and forest, usually in moist areas. It features attractive yellowish/red flowers. The specific epithet viminea refers to the slender stems. The genus is named after the botanist and artist, John Stackhouse.

The species was first collected at Sydney by John White, and described a few years later by the prolific English botanist James Smith.
