= Taco salad =

Tex-Mex food

Taco Salad
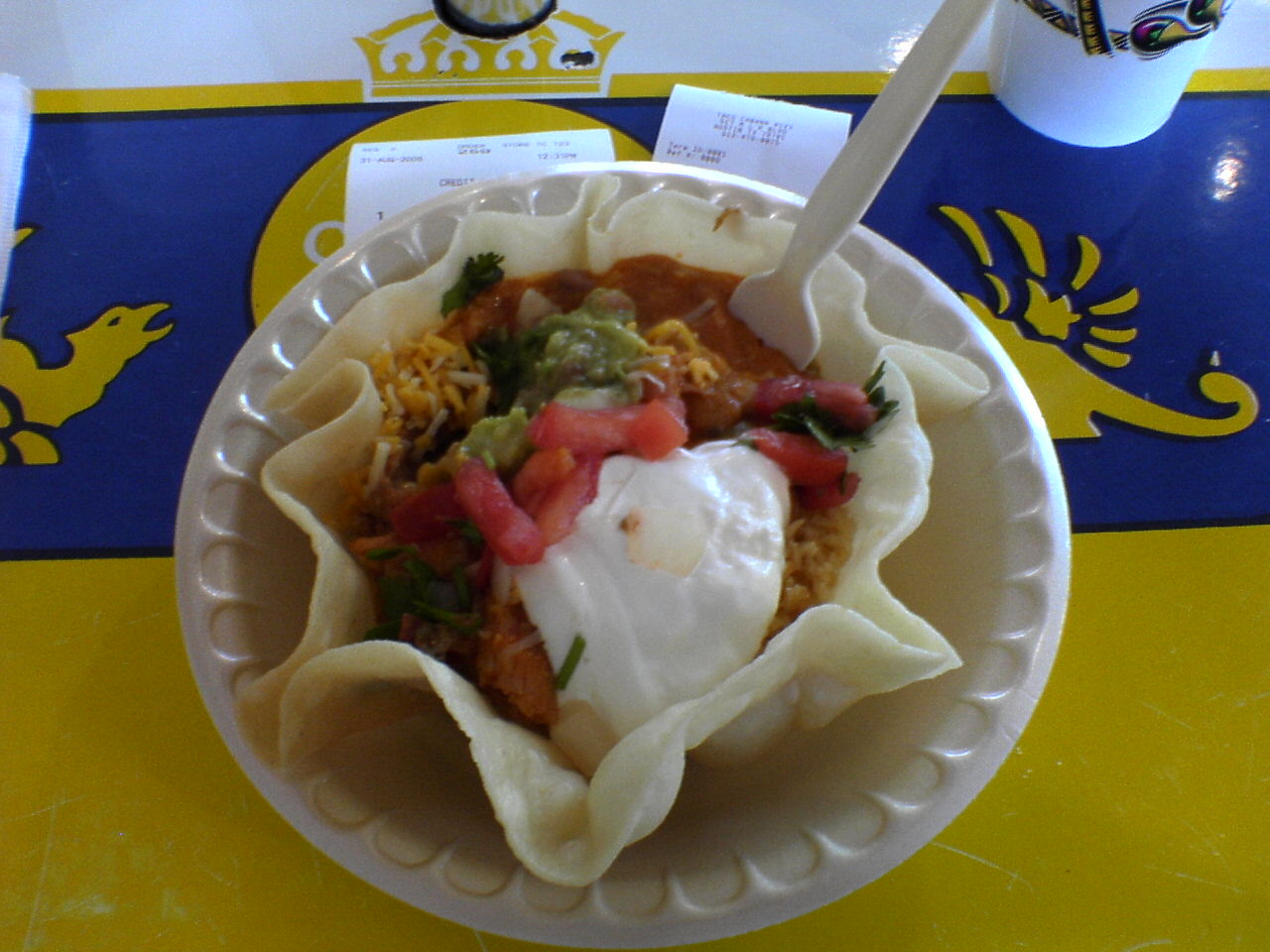
- Alternative names: Taco bowl
- Type: Bowl
- Place of origin: USA
- Region or state: Texas
- Main ingredients: Tortilla, meat, iceberg lettuce, tomatoes, Cheddar cheese, sour cream, guacamole, salsa

A taco salad is a Tex-Mex dish that combines ingredients used in Tex-Mex tacos. The dish originated in Texas during the 1960s.

== Ingredients ==
The salad is served with a fried flour tortilla shell stuffed with shredded iceberg lettuce and topped with diced tomatoes, shredded Cheddar cheese, sour cream, guacamole, and salsa. The salad is topped with taco meat (ground beef), seasoned shredded chicken or beans and/or Spanish rice for vegetarians.

== See also ==
- Frito pie
- Haystacks
- List of salads
- Tostada
