= Stackhousia minima =

Scientific classification
- Kingdom: Plantae
- Clade: Embryophytes
- Clade: Tracheophytes
- Clade: Angiosperms
- Clade: Eudicots
- Clade: Rosids
- Order: Celastrales
- Family: Celastraceae
- Genus: Stackhousia
- Species: S. minima

Binomial name
- Stackhousia minima Hook.f.

Species of herb

Stackhousia minima is a perennial herb species in the family Celastraceae. It is native to New Zealand.
