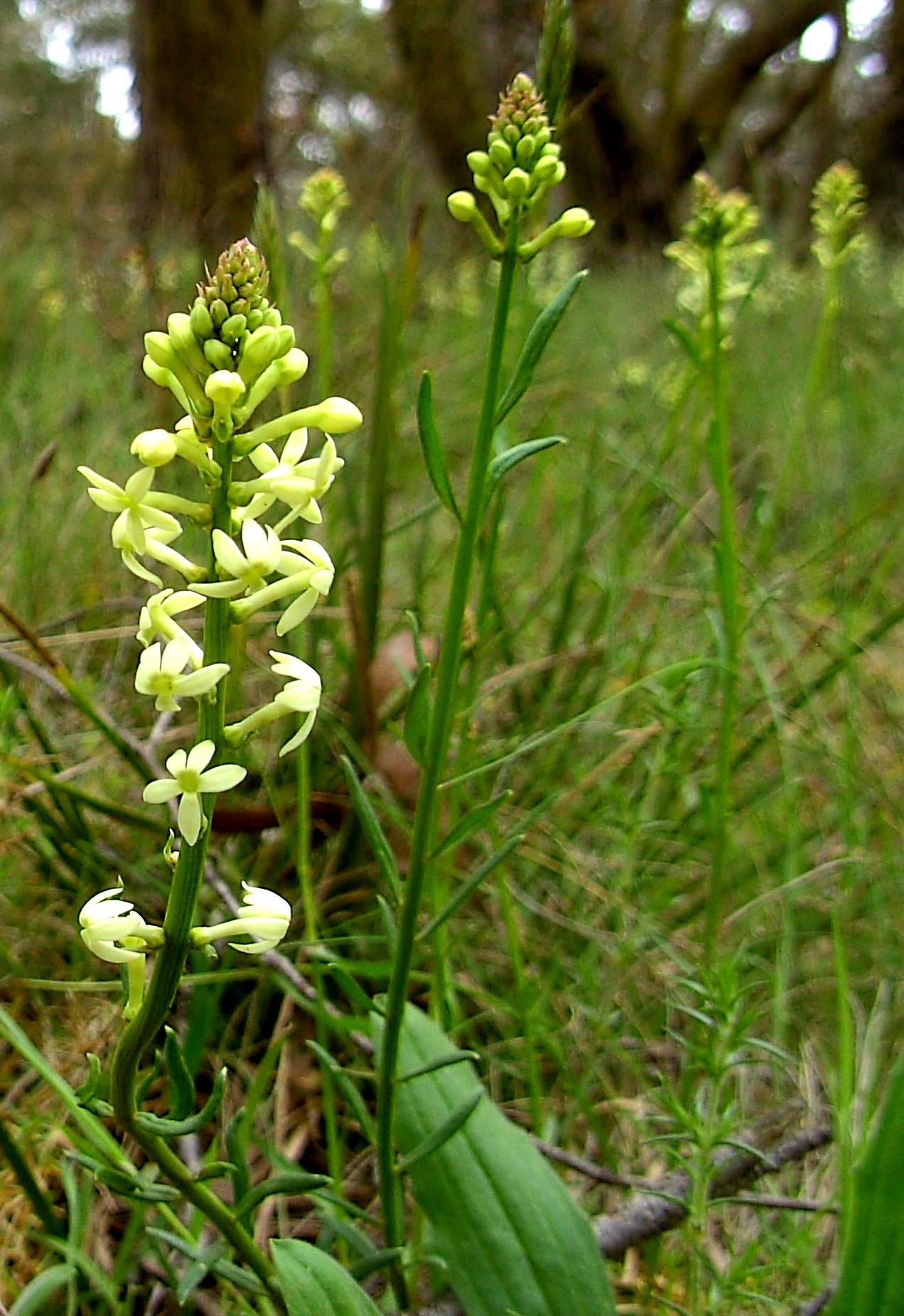

Scientific classification
- Kingdom: Plantae
- Clade: Tracheophytes
- Clade: Angiosperms
- Clade: Eudicots
- Clade: Rosids
- Order: Celastrales
- Family: Celastraceae
- Genus: Stackhousia
- Species: S. monogyna

Binomial name
- Stackhousia monogyna Labill.

Synonyms
- Stackhousia dietrichiae Domin; Stackhousia giuriatii Pamp.; Stackhousia gunniana Schuch.; Stackhousia gunnii Schltdl.; Stackhousia linariifolia A.Cunn.; Stackhousia lutea Sond. ex Schuch.; Stackhousia maidenii Pamp.; Stackhousia maidenii var. flexuosa Pamp.; Stackhousia maidenii var. typica Pamp. nom. inval.; Stackhousia monogyna var. linariifolia (A.Cunn.) Benth.; Stackhousia monogyna var. obtusa (Lindl.) Pamp.; Stackhousia obtusa Lindl.; Stackhousia tryonii F.M.Bailey

= Stackhousia monogyna =

Creamy stackhousia

Species of plant

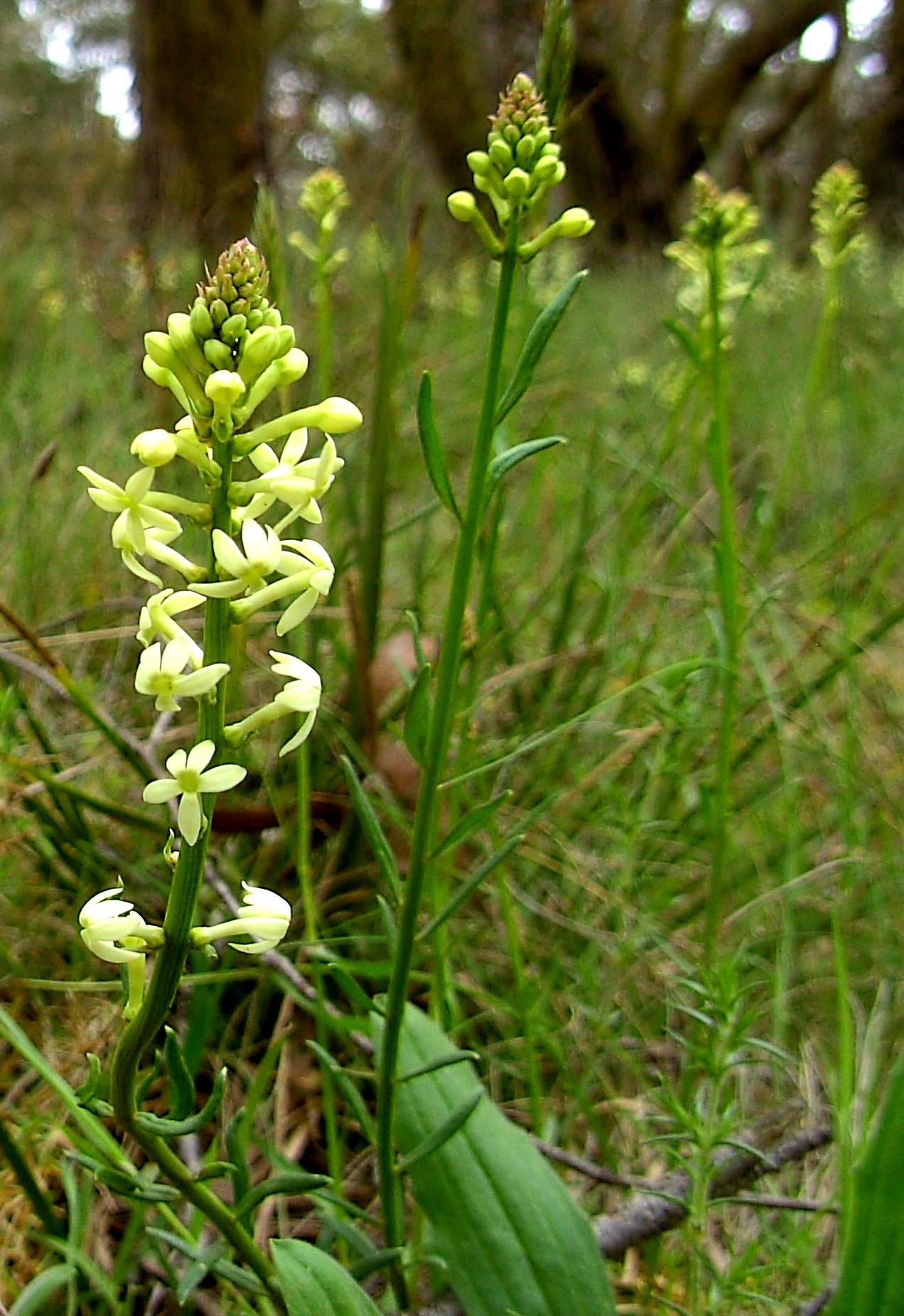
Stackhousia monogyna photographed in Adaminaby, NSW

Stackhousia monogyna, commonly known as creamy stackhousia or creamy candles, is a flowering plant in the family Celastraceae. It is a small multi-stemmed plant with narrow leaves and terminal spikes of white, cream or yellow flowers. It is a widespread species found in all states of Australia but not the Northern Territory.

== Description ==
Stackhousia monogyna is a slender, multi-stemmed, perennial herb to 70 cm (28 in) high, covered with soft hairs or smooth on upright or ascending stems. The leaves are dark green, mostly narrow, linear to lance-shaped, up to 30 mm (1.2 in) long, 2–4 mm (0.079–0.157 in) wide and rounded, acute or with a short point at the apex. The inflorescence consists of numerous white, cream or yellow flowers in a densely-packed cylindrical spike, each flower is tubular with five pointed spreading lobes up to 5 mm (0.20 in) long. Flowering occurs from late winter to early summer and the fruit is a wide oval or ellipsoid shaped mericarp, wrinkled to veined and 1.9–2.8 mm (0.075–0.110 in) long.

== Taxonomy and naming ==
The species was described in 1861 by Ferdinand von Mueller as Desdemodium acanthocladum. In 1805 French naturalist Jacques Labillardière changed the name to Stackhousia monogyna and the description was published in Novae Hollandiae Plantarum Specimen. The specific epithet (monogyna) means "one", probably referring to the one-seeded fruit.

== Distribution and habitat ==
Creamy stackhousia is a common widespread species growing in grassland and dry forest on gravel, clay and granite in all states of Australia but not the Northern Territory.
