= Stackhousia scoparia =

Scientific classification
- Kingdom: Plantae
- Clade: Tracheophytes
- Clade: Angiosperms
- Clade: Eudicots
- Clade: Rosids
- Order: Celastrales
- Family: Celastraceae
- Genus: Stackhousia
- Species: S. scoparia

Binomial name
- Stackhousia scoparia Benth.

Species of herb

Stackhousia scoparia is a species of plant in the family Celastraceae.

The perennial herb has a broom-like habit and typically grows to a height of 0.15 to 0.6 metres (0.49 to 1.97 ft). It blooms between August and January producing yellow-green-brown flowers.

The species is found in the Wheatbelt, Great Southern and Goldfields-Esperance regions of Western Australia where it grows in gravel-sand-loam soils over laterite.
