= Fremont culture =

Pre-Columbian archaeological culture

Geographical distribution of Fremont culture

The Fremont culture or Fremont people is a pre-Columbian archaeological culture named after the Fremont River in Utah, where the culture's sites were discovered by local indigenous peoples like the Navajo and Ute. In Navajo culture, the pictographs are credited to people who lived before the flood. The Fremont River itself is named for American explorer John C. Frémont. It inhabited sites in what is now Utah and parts of Nevada, Idaho, Wyoming and Colorado from AD 1 to 1301 (2,000–700 years ago). It was adjacent to, roughly contemporaneous with, but distinctly different from the Ancestral Pueblo peoples located to their south.

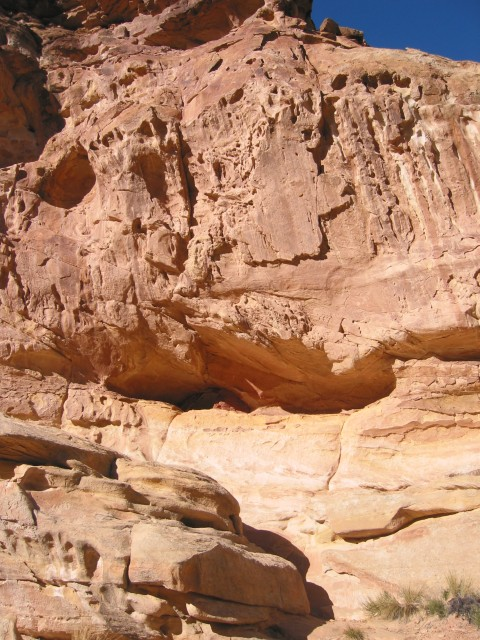
Typical "Moki Hut" placement in the crevice of the cliff

== Location ==
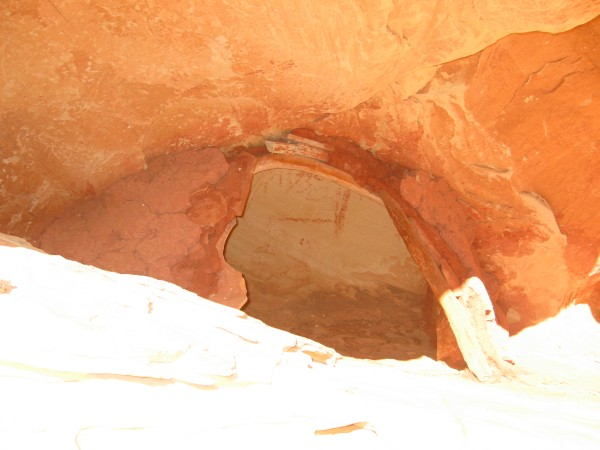
A Fremont Granary, called Moki Huts locally

Fremont Indian State Park in the Clear Creek Canyon area in Sevier County Utah contains the biggest Fremont culture site in Utah. Thousand-year-old pit houses, petroglyphs, and other Fremont artifacts were discovered at Range Creek, Utah. Nearby Nine Mile Canyon has long been known for its large collection of Fremont rock art. Other sites are found in The San Rafael Swell, Capitol Reef National Park, Dinosaur National Monument, Zion National Park, and Arches National Park.

== Name ==
The name "Fremont" was first applied to an archaeological assemblage of tools, art, architecture, and pottery by Noel Morss in his 1931 book, The Ancient Culture of the Fremont River in Utah.

In 1776, Fray Escalante of the Domínguez–Escalante expedition referred to them as "Tihuas" or "Tehuas", by means of ethnographic analogy to contemporary Tiwa Puebloans, writing that the Colorado Plateau was "The land by way of which the Tihuas, Tehuas and the other Indians transmigrated to this kingdom; which is clearly shown by the ruins of the pueblos I have seen in it, whose form was the same that they afterwards gave to theirs in New Mexico; and the fragments of clay and pottery which I also saw in the said country are much like that which the said Tehuas make today."

John Steward, writing in his journal on August 4, 1871 during the Colorado River Exploring Expedition, reported having found two graves and speculated that, "They may be those of the Moquis tribes which evidently inhabited this section of the country at some time and were driven out many years ago. Their ruins are everywhere to be found where the country is rendered inhabitable by garden spots along the river." "Moqui" is a Hopi autonym borrowed into other adjacent languages. The Ute referred to the former inhabitants of the many village ruins in their territory as the "mocutz".

Modern scholarship has suggested that it may be more appropriate to refer to this assemblage as the "Fremont complex" rather than as a coherent cultural group, as the use of the generic label "The Fremont" implies the existence of a bounded, discrete entity which, "fails miserably in defining a people who [...] are not easily described or classified."

== People ==
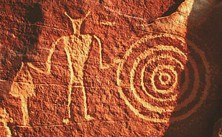
Fremont petroglyph, Dinosaur National Monument

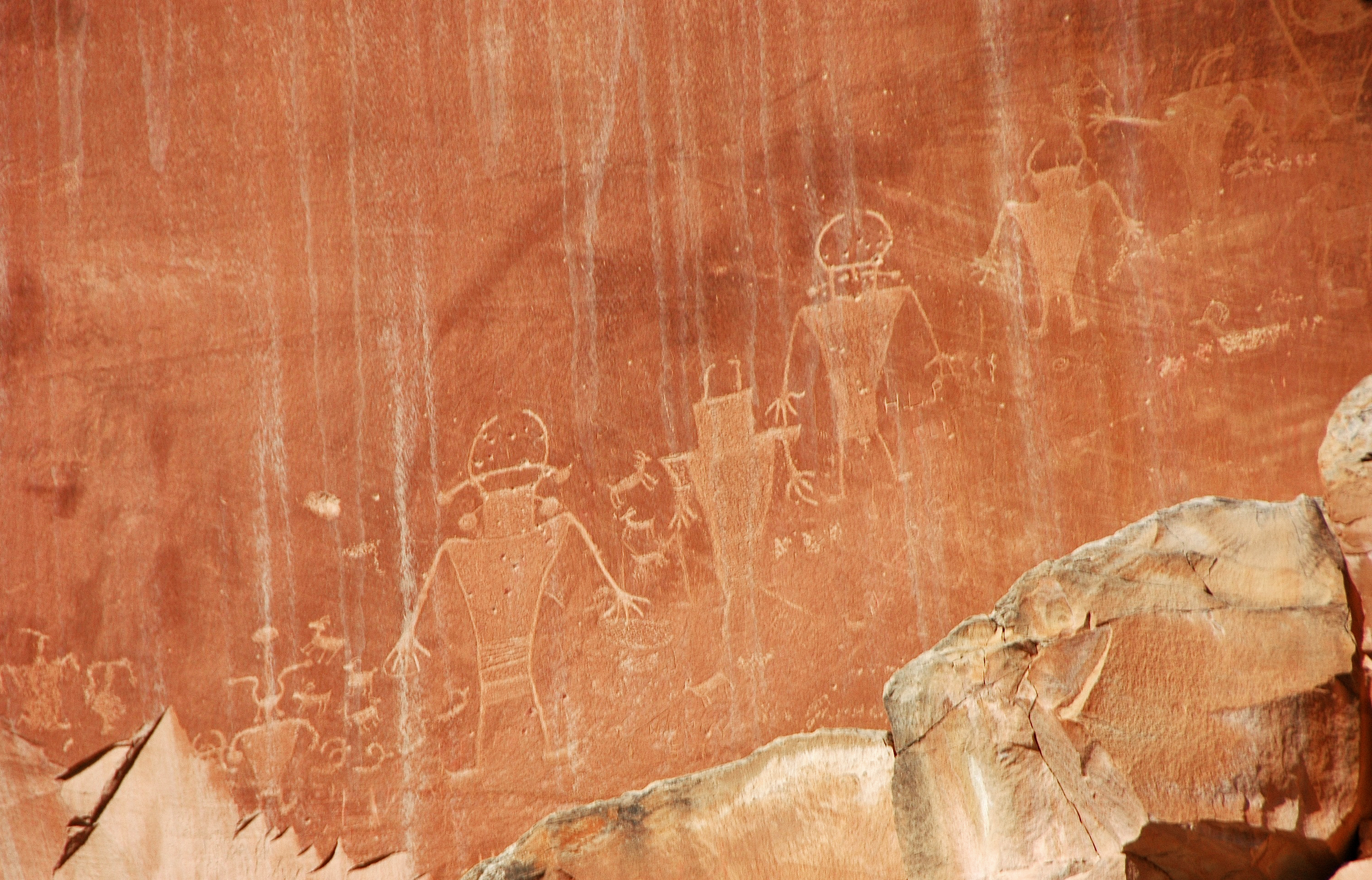
Fremont Indian petroglyphs in Capitol Reef National Park, southern Utah

Scholars do not agree that the Fremont culture represents a single, cohesive group with a common language, ancestry, or way of life, but several aspects of their material culture provides evidence for this concept. First, Fremont culture people foraged wild food sources and grew corn. The culture participated in a continuum of fairly reliable subsistence strategies that no doubt varied by place and time. This shows up in the archaeological record at most village sites and long-term camps as a collection of butchered, cooked and then discarded bone from mostly deer and rabbits, charred corn cobs with the kernels removed, and wild edible plant remains. Other unifying characteristics include the manufacture of relatively expedient gray ware pottery and a signature style of basketry and rock art. Most of the Fremont lived in small single and extended family units comprising villages ranging from two to a dozen pithouse structures, with only a few having been occupied at any one time. Still, exceptions to this rule exist (partly why the Fremont have earned a reputation for being so hard to define), including an unusually large village in the Parowan Valley of southwestern Utah, the large and extensively excavated village of Five Finger Ridge at the above mentioned Fremont Indian State Park, and others, all appearing to be anomalous in that they were either occupied for a long period of time, were simultaneously occupied by a large number of people, 60 or more at any given moment, or both. The Fremont are sometimes thought to have begun as a splinter group of the Ancestral Pueblo people, although archaeologists do not agree on this theory. In this vein, the eastern Fremont have been connected to the Kiowa people.

According to archaeologist Dean Snow,

Fremont people generally wore moccasins like their Great Basin ancestors rather than sandals like the Ancestral Puebloans. They were part-time farmers who lived in scattered semi-sedentary farmsteads and small villages, never entirely giving up traditional hunting and gathering for more risky full-time farming. They made pottery, built houses and food storage facilities, and raised corn, but overall they must have looked like poor cousins to the major traditions of the Greater Southwest, while at the same time seeming like aspiring copy-cats to the hunter-gatherers still living around them.

Snow notes that Fremont culture declined due to changing climate conditions c. 950 CE. The culture moved to the then-marshy areas of northwestern Utah, which sustained them for about 400 years.

== Recent developments ==
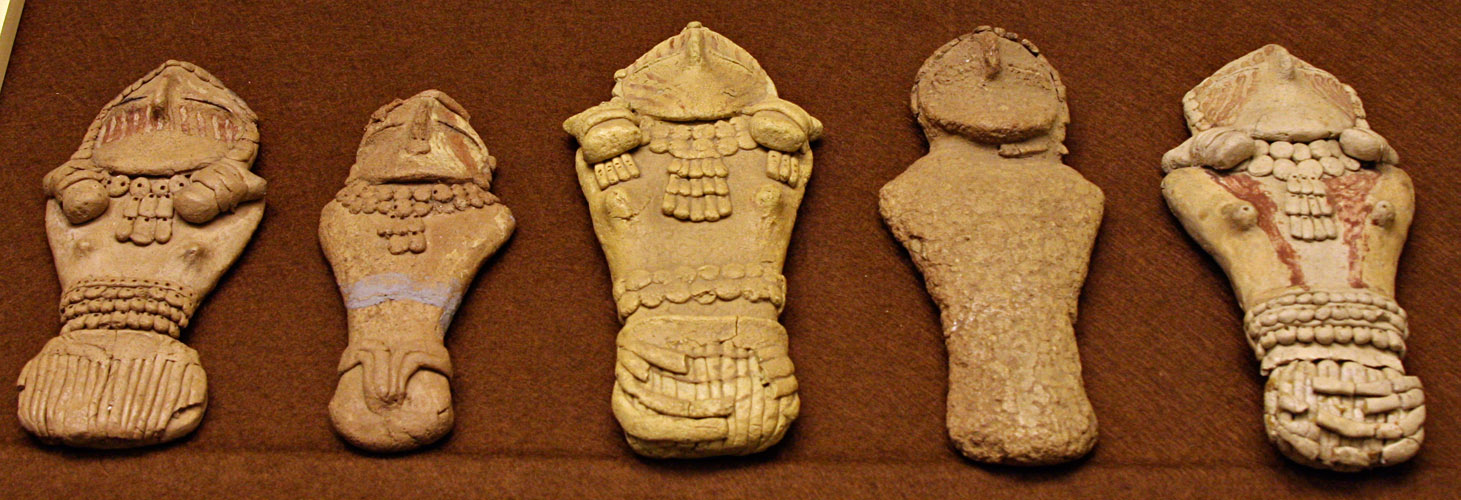
Pilling Figurines, unfired clay Fremont figurines, on display in the College of Eastern Utah Prehistoric Museum.

The Range Creek Canyon site complex is unambiguously identified with the Fremont culture, and because of its pristine state, brought an immense amount of archaeological insight to this hitherto obscure culture.

In 2000, mtDNA research suggested that ancient Fremont people and modern Jemez Puebloans derive from the same maternal lineage.

First explored in 2004, the Range Creek property was a major find:

Pit houses dug halfway in the ground, their roofs caved in, dotted the valley floor and surrounding hills. Arrowheads, beads, ceramic shards and stone-tool remnants were strewn all over. Human bones poked out of rock overhangs, and hundreds of bizarre human figures with tapered limbs and odd projections emanating from their heads were chiseled on the cliff walls ... the pit houses were intact ... and granaries were stuffed with corncobs a thousand years old.

Research completed in 2006 indicated that the land included 1,000-year-old hamlets of the Fremont people "highly mobile hunters and farmers who lived mostly in Utah from around A.D. 200 to 1300 before disappearing..."

According to Snow, the Fremont's eventual fate is unknown, but it is possible that they moved into Idaho, Nebraska and Kansas, and may have become part of the Dismal River culture to the east or the Ancestral Pueblo communities to the south or absorbed by the arriving Numic-speaking peoples.

== See also ==
- Cañon Pintado, a Fremont culture site in Colorado
- List of dwellings of Pueblo peoples
- Nine Mile Canyon
- Rochester Rock Art Panel
