= Stackhousia pubescens =

Downy stackhousia

Scientific classification
- Kingdom: Plantae
- Clade: Tracheophytes
- Clade: Angiosperms
- Clade: Eudicots
- Clade: Rosids
- Order: Celastrales
- Family: Celastraceae
- Genus: Stackhousia
- Species: S. pubescens

Binomial name
- Stackhousia pubescens A.Rich.

Synonyms
- Plokiostigma lehmannii Schuch.; Stackhousia pubescens f. elatior Pamp.; Stackhousia pubescens f. genuina Pamp.; Stackhousia pubescens f. leiococca Schuch.

Species of flowering plant

Stackhousia pubescens, commonly known as downy stackhousia, is a species of plant in the family Celastraceae.

The species is found from the Mid West, Wheatbelt, South West, Great Southern and Goldfields-Esperance regions of Western Australia.
