= Pilling Figurines =

Set of eleven clay figurines made by the Fremont culture

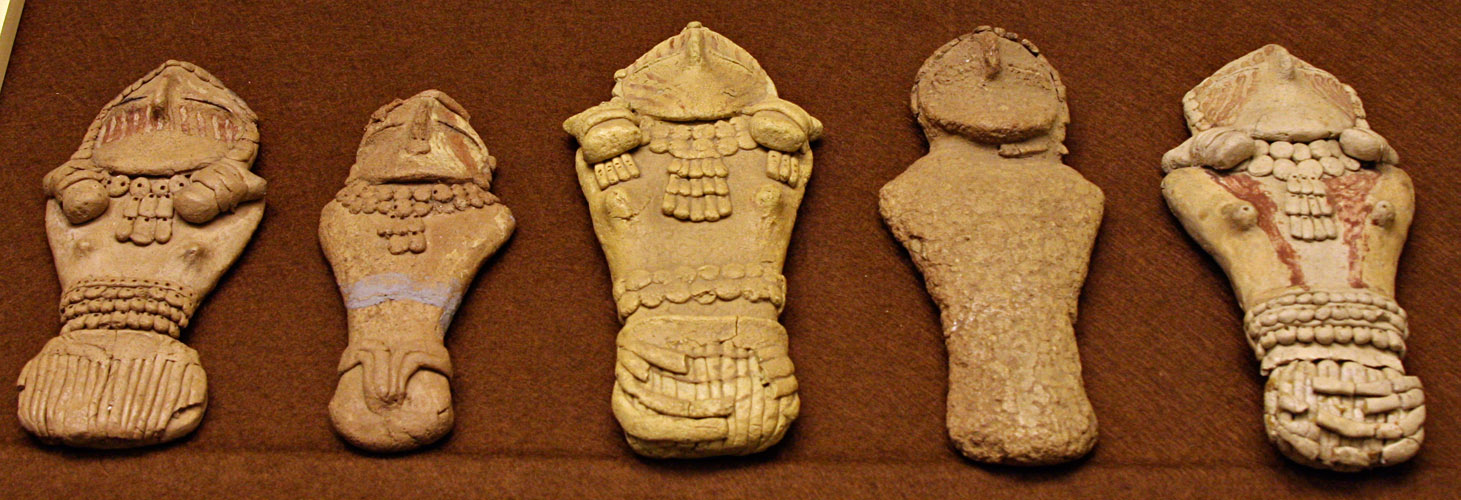
Pilling Figurines in the USU Eastern Prehistoric Museum.

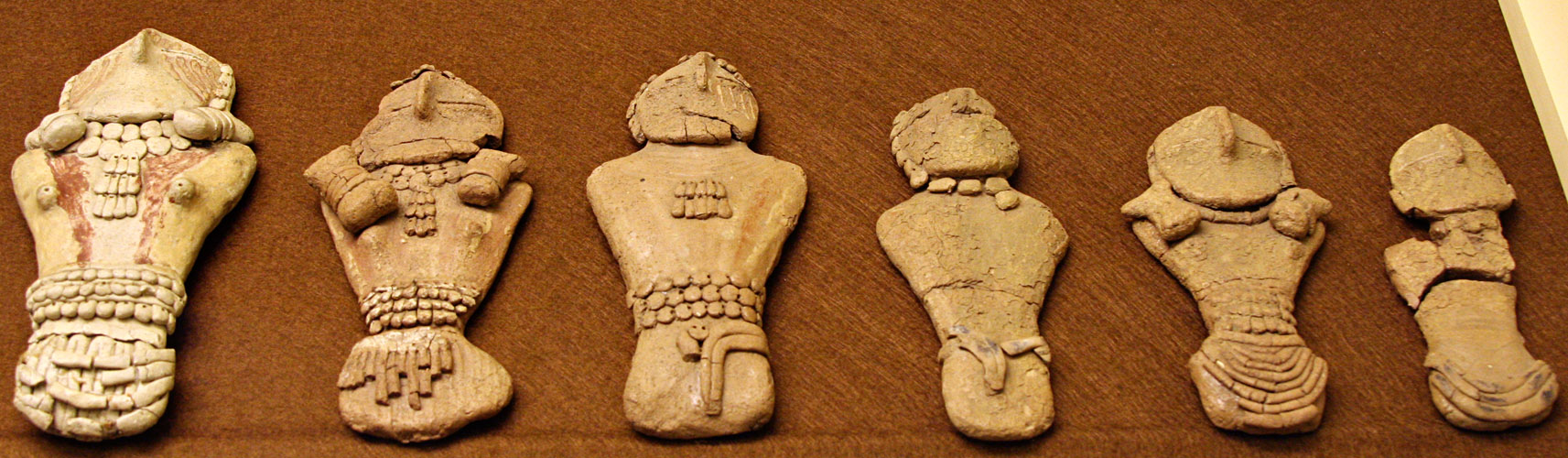
Pilling Figurines in the USU Eastern Prehistoric Museum.

The Pilling Figurines are a set of eleven clay figurines made by the Fremont culture. They were discovered in 1950 by Clarence Pilling, a Utah rancher, under a rock overhang in a side canyon of Range Creek, Utah. The figurines are believed to be around 1000 years old.

The Pilling Figurines are all approximately 4 to 6 inches (10 to 15 cm) in height. They are constructed of unfired clay and are decorated with applied clay ornaments. The figurines also show evidence of red, buff, and black paint. These markings and colors have offered insight and revealed how ancient Fremont people dressed and adorned themselves. Each one is distinctive in both appearance and gender. The female figurines have breasts, wider hips, and wear aprons while the male figurines wear loincloths (except for one which has a kilt of sorts). They appear to have been made in matching male and female pairs leaving an unmatched female figurine. They are considered to be among the most important pieces of ancient portable art that have been discovered in the Southwestern United States. All eleven figurines, can now be viewed at the USU Eastern Prehistoric Museum.

== Figurine Number 2 ==
After Pilling discovered the 11 figurines in 1950, the College of Eastern Utah Prehistoric Museum (now USU Eastern Prehistoric Museum) in Price, Utah took possession of them. The museum took the figurines on a statewide tour in Utah during the 1960s. While on tour, one of the figurines, Number 2, disappeared. It is not clear exactly when the figurine went missing, but only ten figurines returned to the museum after the tour ended. The disappearance initially went unnoticed because another figurine had been broken into two pieces, so the collection still had 11 pieces. The whereabouts of Number 2 remained a mystery until November 2011, when Utah State University anthropologist Bonnie Pitblado received an anonymous package in the mail. Inside was a clay figurine, strikingly similar in appearance to the Pilling Figurines of the Fremont Culture. Along with the figurine was a note that read:

Sometime between 1978 and 1982 I came into possession of this piece by way of a vagabond acquaintance. He had told of ‘acquiring’ it near Vernal, Utah. I have great interest and respect for this continent's native culture and have always hoped to somehow return this to wherever it had come from. ... I am very excited at the prospect of it being returned to its proper place.

Pitblado immediately sought to discover if the figurine sent to her was the long lost Pilling Figurine. Pitblado, along with a team of experts, analyzed the figurine and compared it to the 10 Pilling Figurines to ensure that it was not a replicate or unrelated. They used multiple chemical tests to ensure the authenticity of the figurine. They used a scanning electron microscope to detect the polyvinyl alcohol (PVA) that had originally been applied to all 11 figurines to help preserve them. Using a technique called X-ray fluorescence, they were also able to identify the source of the clay used to make the figurines as being the same and matched trace elements found on the missing figurine to elements on the original 10. Experts compared the techniques used to make the figurines, which also indicated that they were made by the same artist. These results led the team to confirm that the figurine sent to them via mail was in fact the missing number 2 figurine.
