= Stacker (disambiguation) =

A stacker is a machine used in bulk material handling.

Stacker may also refer to:

- Stacker, disk compression software released by Stac Electronics
  - Lempel–Ziv–Stac, also known as "Stacker Compression", a data compression method for point-to-point protocol developed by Stac Electronics
- Stacker 2, a synephrine-based drug for weight loss
- Autoloader (data storage device), alternative name for a device used to automate changing tape cartridges in a magnetic tape drive
- BK Stacker, a type of hamburger sold by Burger King
- Reach stacker, a vehicle for handling intermodal cargo containers
- Stacker (arcade game)

== See also ==
- Stack (disambiguation)
