= Haystack Mountain =

Haystack Mountain may refer to:

== United States ==
- Haystack Mountain (Antarctica)
- Haystack Mountain (Connecticut)
- Haystack Mountain School of Crafts, Deer Isle, Maine, United States
- Haystack Mountain (Maryland)
- Haystack Mountain (Hill County, Montana), a mountain in Hill County, Montana
- Haystack Mountain (Jefferson County, Montana), in the Boulder Mountains
- Haystack Mountain (Lincoln County, Montana), a mountain in Lincoln County, Montana
- Haystack Mountain (Powell County, Montana), a mountain in Powell County, Montana
- Haystack Mountain (Sanders County, Montana) (4,528 feet (1,380 m)), a mountain in Sanders County, Montana
- Haystack Mountain (New Mexico)
- Mount Haystack (New York)
- Haystack Mountain (Pennsylvania)
- Haystack Mountain (Vermont)
  - Haystack Mountain Ski Area
- Haystack Mountain (Wyoming)

== Elsewhere ==
- Haystack Mountain (New South Wales), Australia, northwest of the town of Bonalbo

== See also ==
- Little Haystack Mountain (New Hampshire)
