= Stax =

Stax can refer to:

- StAX, (Computer Programming) Streaming API for reading and writing XML in Java
- Stax Ltd, a Japanese brand of electrostatic headphones
- Stax Records, an American record company
- Lay's Stax, a brand of potato snack chips sold by Lay's
