= Stackhousia dielsii =

Yellow stackhousia

Scientific classification
- Kingdom: Plantae
- Clade: Tracheophytes
- Clade: Angiosperms
- Clade: Eudicots
- Clade: Rosids
- Order: Celastrales
- Family: Celastraceae
- Genus: Stackhousia
- Species: S. dielsii

Binomial name
- Stackhousia dielsii Pamp.

Species of herb

Stackhousia dielsii, commonly known as yellow stackhousia, is a species of plant in the family Celastraceae.

The dense perennial herb typically grows to a height of 0.2 to 0.6 metres (0.7 to 2.0 ft) and has a sedge-like habit. It blooms between July and November and produces yellow-green flowers.

The species is found on sandy soils in coastal areas of the Mid West region of Western Australia.
