= Piling Bay =

Bay in Nunavut, Canada

- Location within Nunavut Location within Canada
- Location: Foxe Basin
- Coordinates: 68°53′N 74°47′W
- Basin countries: Canada
- Settlements: Uninhabited

Piling Bay is an uninhabited waterway in the Qikiqtaaluk Region, Nunavut, Canada. It is located on the west central coast of Baffin Island. An arm of the Foxe Basin, it contains many small, unnamed islands. Foley Island and North Tweedsmuir Island lie outside the mouth of the bay to the south / southwest.

Nearby is Angaku'habvik, an Inuit initiation site for angakkuit, intellectual and spiritual figures in Inuit culture.

== History ==
In 1911, the German ornithologist, Bernhard Hantzsch, explored the area of Piling Bay.
