= Haystack (food) =

American dish

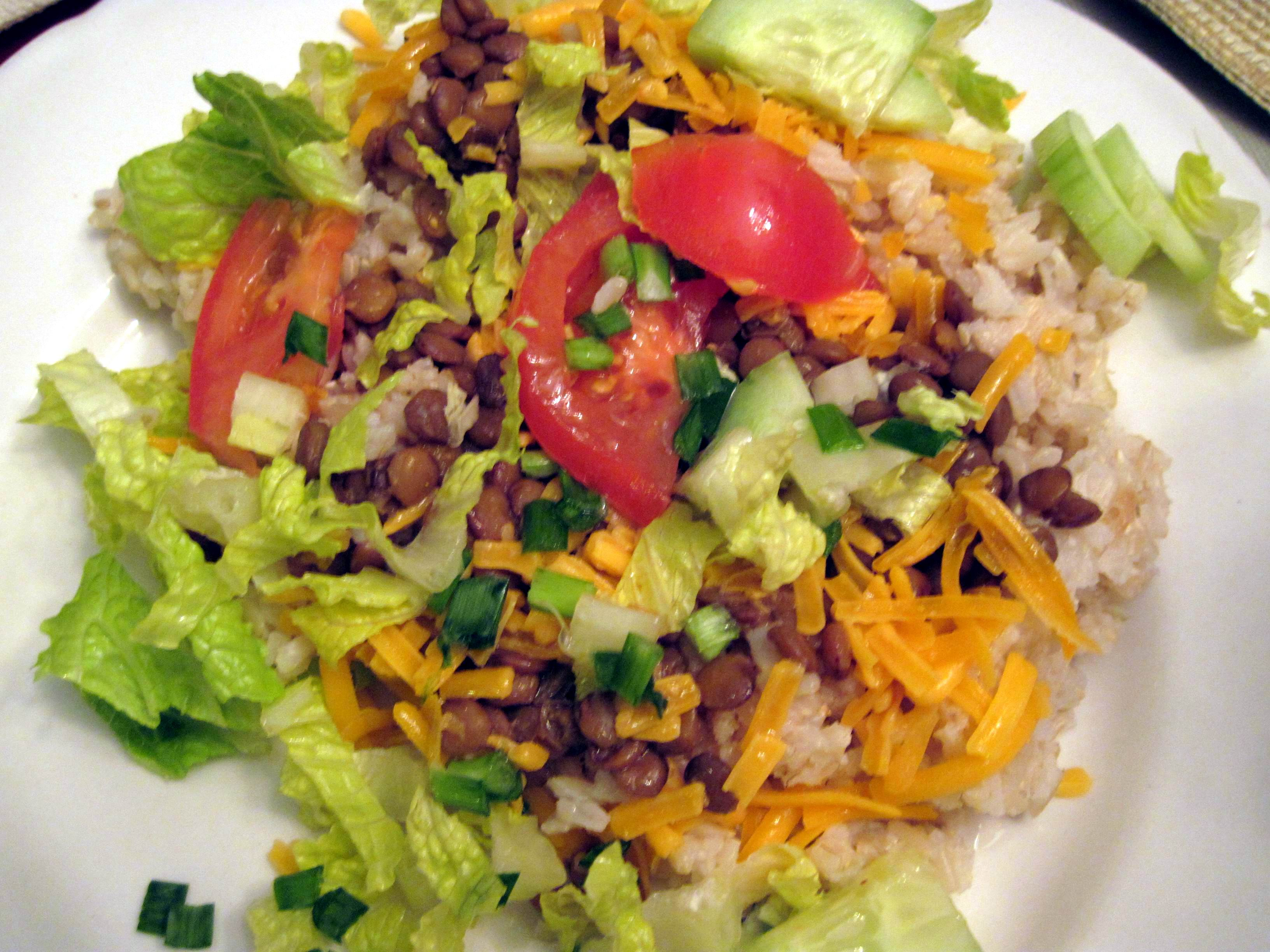
A haystack made with rice, lentils, cheese, vegetables, and lemon sauce

In the United States, a haystack is a dish composed of a starchy food (Fritos, tortilla chips, Doritos) topped by a protein (beans, black beans, grated cheddar cheese, taco-seasoned meat or meat alternative) or rice, in combination with fresh vegetables (shredded lettuce, tomatoes, olives, peppers), and garnished with various condiments (guacamole, sour cream, ranch dressing, and/or salsa). Haystacks are conceptually like a deconstructed tostada. The haystacks ingredients are served individually and assembled on the plate by the person who will be eating it.

== History and composition ==
Haystacks are composed of relatively small amounts of many ingredients, in flexible combinations, so they are well suited to serving large numbers of people at a low cost. The flexibility and crowd-pleasing nature of haystacks have made them a popular family and small-group choice for at least 60 years. Haystacks are commonly used among three distinct North American religious subcultures.

=== Adventist haystacks ===
Seventh-day Adventist haystacks begin with a corn chip base, often Fritos, though larger, restaurant style chips are often used as well, which are typically crushed with the heel of the hand, followed by beans, and grated cheddar cheese. Lettuce, tomatoes, vegetables, and condiments, especially salsa, are typically added last. While the North American iteration traditionally involves crushing the corn chips with the heel of the hand, serving conventions vary by region. In Australian variations and health focused formats, such as those published by major culinary platforms like Taste.com.au and health aware Blue Zones, recipes often explicitly specify layering ingredients directly onto a whole, intact and uncrushed corn chip foundation to maintain a crunchy texture and allow the chips to be used for scooping. Many Adventists are vegetarians, and most official or semi-official Adventist cultural dining events are vegetarian, which is one reason Adventist haystacks are so popular with this group. As such, meat is typically not included. Often a soy-based ground hamburger meat alternative is used as an additional haystack ingredient.

Haystacks are a common and iconic feature of after-service meals or potlucks, served either at church or in member's homes. Many times, haystacks are commonly seen in the United States at events connected to Pathfinders, the church's scouting organization, especially at camping events called "Camporees".

A Seventh-day Adventist named Ella May Hartlein is credited with coming up with the recipe for this version of haystacks in the early 1950s, when she and her family craved tostadas and could not find a Mexican restaurant close to their home.

=== Amish haystacks ===
The Amish haystack has less of a Mexican influence, and can contain meat (as compared to the Adventist version). The Amish haystack is built on a lettuce base, with crushed chips or crackers sprinkled on top, followed by cooked hamburger in tomato, spaghetti-like sauce, and nacho cheese. The haystack is finished with chopped vegetables, cheese, and any desired condiments.

Amish haystacks tend to be associated with community fundraisers for families in need, as opposed to the Adventist haystacks which are more associated with after-service shared community meals.

=== Hawaiian haystacks ===
Hawaiian haystacks use a white rice base, covered by small pieces of chicken in a sauce or gravy. They are topped by a variety of items, often including the eponymous pineapple chunks, cheddar cheese, celery, tomatoes, sliced almonds, coconut, and chow mein noodles for crunch. Hawaiian haystacks, named for the use of pineapple chunks as a topping. In contrast to the Mexican notes characteristic of the Adventist haystack, Hawaiian haystacks are characterized by Asian flavors.

Hawaiian haystacks are particularly popular in Utah and other western states where there is a high percentage of members of The Church of Jesus Christ of Latter-day Saints, who are known as Mormons. Thus, Hawaiian haystacks are sometimes called Mormon haystacks. Commonly served at church potlucks, Hawaiian haystacks are part of what is sometimes referred to as "Mormon cooking", which also includes such dishes as pretzel jello salad, funeral potatoes and frogeye salad. In the community associated with The Church of Jesus Christ of Latter-day Saints, these are better known as Hawaiian haystacks. The influence of Asian flavors is perhaps a function of the long-time presence of The Church of Jesus Christ of Latter-day Saints in Hawaii.

== See also ==
- Frito pie
- Taco salad
- Taco rice
- Nachos
