= Range Creek =

River in Utah, United States

Coordinates: 39°18′27″N 110°03′26″W

Range Creek, rising in the Book Cliffs in Emery County, Utah, is a high tributary of the Green River, a major tributary of the Colorado River. The creek flows year around.

It has been nominated for classification as a National Wild and Scenic River.

One 4,200-acre area near the Creek, 44 miles southeast of Price, Utah, contains the prehistoric hamlets of the Fremont culture, people who lived in the area between A.D. 200 and 1300.

== Prehistory ==
The Range Creek canyon was first publicized in 2020 as an area with pristine archaeological remains and rock art of the Fremont culture, a precontact Great Basin archaeological culture that was contemporaneous to the Ancestral Pueblo culture located to the south.

== Discovery of ruins and artifacts ==
A cattle rancher owned the 4,200 acres of land along the Creek by the name of Waldo Wilcox. He recognized the value of the prehistoric remains and protected them by erecting a gate with "no trespassing" signs on the only road in. He kept the artifacts a secret. There were many, according to Smithsonian:

Pit houses dug halfway in the ground, their roofs caved in, dotted the valley floor and surrounding hills. Arrowheads, beads, ceramic shards, and stone-tool remnants were strewn all over. Human bones poked out of rock overhangs, and hundreds of bizarre human figures with tapered limbs and odd projections emanating from their heads were chiseled on the cliff walls ... the pit houses were intact ... and granaries were stuffed with corncobs a thousand years old.

In 2001 he sold the property to the Trust for Public Land, which later deeded it to the state of Utah. Wilcox retained the rights to any subsurface mineral and energy deposits. State archaeological developed a plan for carefully protecting and studying the cultural resources of Range Creek. Interest was high due to the undisturbed nature of the site. In December 2009, the State of Utah turned over stewardship of Range Creek to the University of Utah archaeology staff in a land swap deal.

Research completed in 2006 indicated that the land included 1,000-year-old hamlets of the Fremont people "highly mobile hunters and farmers who lived mostly in Utah from around A.D. 200 to 1300 before disappearing..."

As of early 2020, The Natural History Museum of Utah at the University of Utah was managing the property as the "Range Creek Field Station". A report at the time stated that the "vast majority of the sites recorded to date are associated with the Fremont archaeological complex, which dates between about A.D. 500 and A.D. 1350".

The property was open to day-trip visitors for a nominal fee, with a pass—for a specific date --- available for purchase in advance, online; only a limited number of passes were issued for each day. Only pedestrian and horse traffic was allowed to enter the site, and only via the north gate. (The Creek site is surrounded by BLM land, which is "part of a wilderness study area, which prevents mechanized travel".) Primitive camping was allowed outside the gate. There were no services or cell phone service in Range Creek Canyon; high temperatures in summer, and black bears, were of concern. The north gate of the Range Creek Canyon, where parking was available, is on "a steep and narrow unimproved road" which is impassible during wet conditions and requires a high clearance vehicle, preferably with a 4-wheel drive. Guided tours were available from three companies. The Range Creek Research Project was underway, though not during summer 2020.

== See also ==
- List of Utah rivers
- List of tributaries of the Colorado River
- Fremont culture

== Sources ==
- Smithsonian, March 2006, "Secrets of the Range Creek Ranch", pp. 68–75.
- Great Outdoors site
- State of Utah site
- Wild river status
- Wilderness Utah "Finding History in Range Creek"
- ""The Secret Canyon", on season 15, episode 8". Scientific American Frontiers. Chedd-Angier Production Company. 2005. PBS. Archived from the original on January 1, 2006.
