= Rhynchopyga bicolor =

Scientific classification
- Domain: Eukaryota
- Kingdom: Animalia
- Phylum: Arthropoda
- Class: Insecta
- Order: Lepidoptera
- Superfamily: Noctuoidea
- Family: Erebidae
- Subfamily: Arctiinae
- Genus: Rhynchopyga
- Species: R. bicolor

Binomial name
- Rhynchopyga bicolor (Dognin, 1902)

Species of moth

Rhynchopyga bicolor is a species of moth in the subfamily Arctiinae. It is found in Ecuador.

Larvae have been recorded feeding on Peritassa species.
