= Rhynchopyga rubricincta =

Scientific classification
- Kingdom: Animalia
- Phylum: Arthropoda
- Class: Insecta
- Order: Lepidoptera
- Superfamily: Noctuoidea
- Family: Erebidae
- Subfamily: Arctiinae
- Genus: Rhynchopyga
- Species: R. rubricincta

Binomial name
- Rhynchopyga rubricincta Hampson, 1898

Species of moth

Rhynchopyga rubricincta is a species of moth in the subfamily Arctiinae. It is found in Bolivia.
