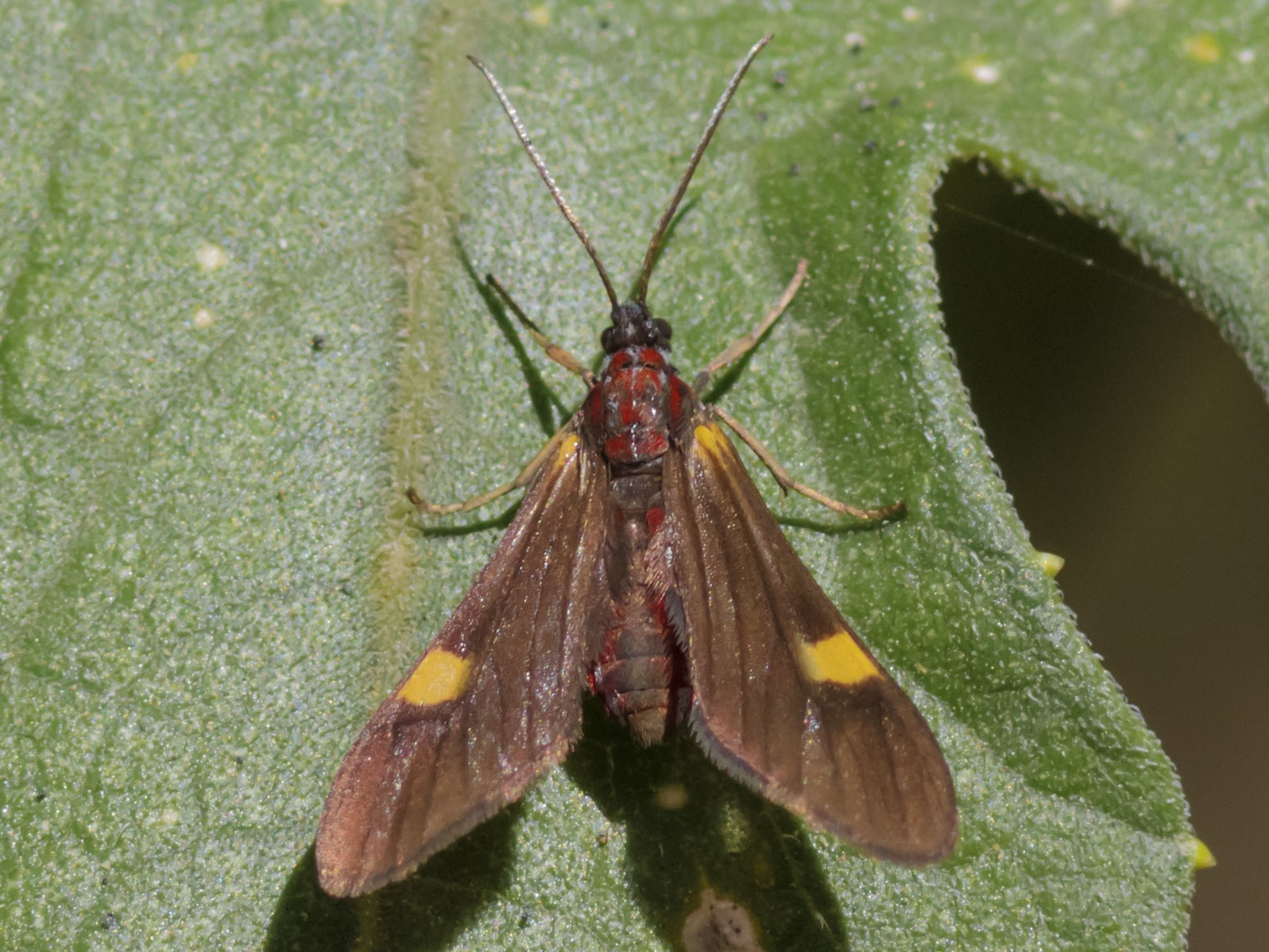

Scientific classification
- Domain: Eukaryota
- Kingdom: Animalia
- Phylum: Arthropoda
- Class: Insecta
- Order: Lepidoptera
- Superfamily: Noctuoidea
- Family: Erebidae
- Subfamily: Arctiinae
- Genus: Rhynchopyga
- Species: R. meisteri

Binomial name
- Rhynchopyga meisteri (Berg, 1883)

Synonyms
- Psoloptera meisteri Berg, 1883

= Rhynchopyga meisteri =

Species of moth

Rhynchopyga meisteri is a moth in the subfamily Arctiinae. It is found in Brazil (Amazons, Castro, Parana, Rio de Janeiro) and Argentina.
