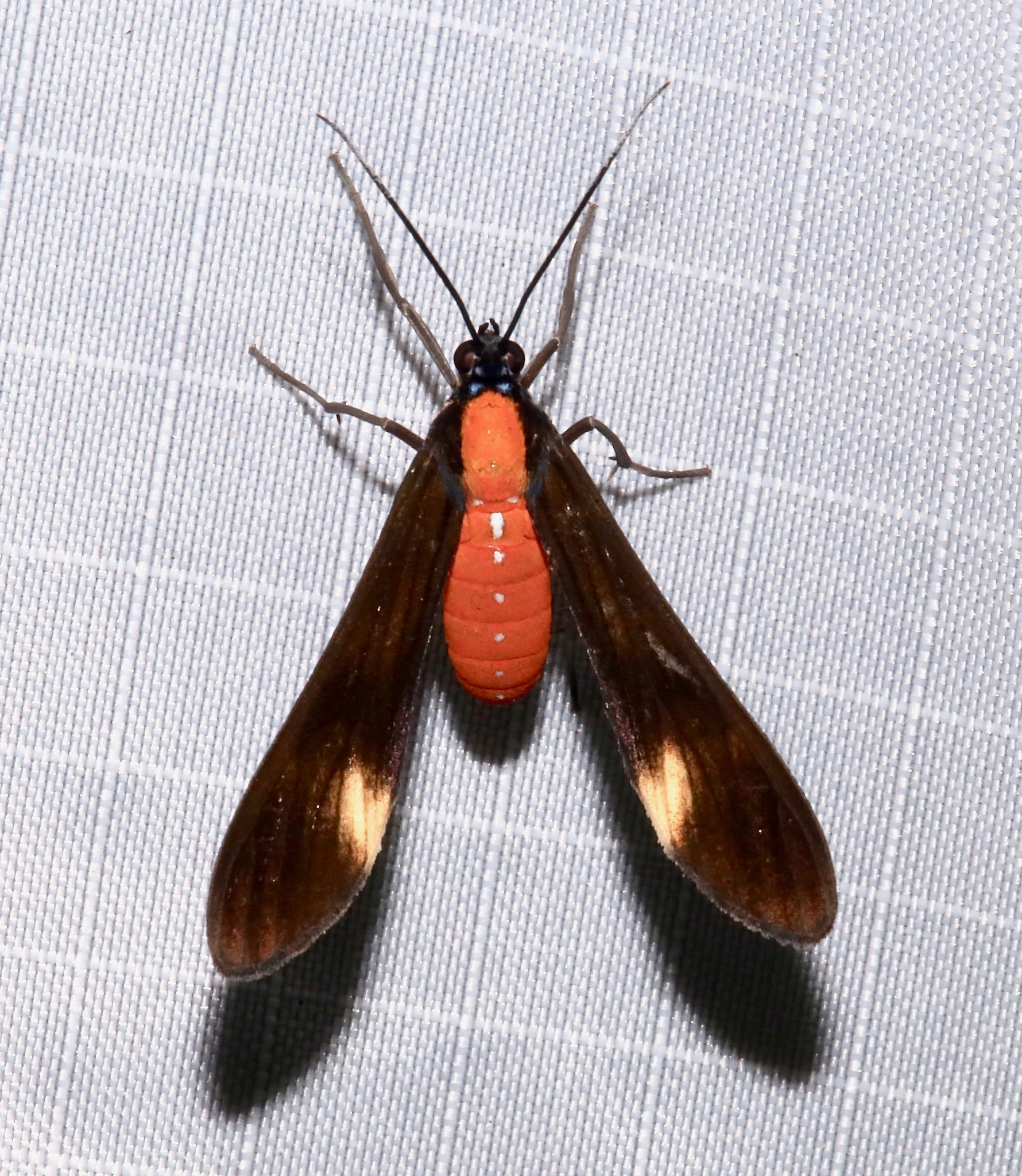
- Rhynchopyga elongatus

Scientific classification
- Domain: Eukaryota
- Kingdom: Animalia
- Phylum: Arthropoda
- Class: Insecta
- Order: Lepidoptera
- Superfamily: Noctuoidea
- Family: Erebidae
- Subfamily: Arctiinae
- Genus: Rhynchopyga; Felder, 1874

= Rhynchopyga =

Genus of moths

Rhynchopyga is a genus of moths in the subfamily Arctiinae.

== Species ==
- Rhynchopyga albigutta Draudt, 1915
- Rhynchopyga bicolor Dognin
- Rhynchopyga braconida Kaye, 1911
- Rhynchopyga castra E. D. Jones, 1912
- Rhynchopyga discalba Kaye, 1918
- Rhynchopyga elongata Dognin, 1890
- Rhynchopyga flavicollis H. Druce, 1884
- Rhynchopyga garleppi Gaede, 1926
- Rhynchopyga hymenopteridia Rothschild, 1911
- Rhynchopyga ichneumonea Felder, 1869
- Rhynchopyga meisteri Berg, 1883
- Rhynchopyga metaphaea Hampson, 1898
- Rhynchopyga pimpla Draudt, 1915
- Rhynchopyga rubricincta Hampson, 1898
- Rhynchopyga semibrunnea Gaede, 1926
- Rhynchopyga semirufa H. Druce, 1906
- Rhynchopyga steniptera Hampson, 1909
- Rhynchopyga subflamma H. Druce, 1884
- Rhynchopyga xanthospila Hampson, 1898
- Rhynchopyga xanthozona Draudt, 1915
