= Rhynchopyga steniptera =

Scientific classification
- Kingdom: Animalia
- Phylum: Arthropoda
- Class: Insecta
- Order: Lepidoptera
- Superfamily: Noctuoidea
- Family: Erebidae
- Subfamily: Arctiinae
- Genus: Rhynchopyga
- Species: R. steniptera

Binomial name
- Rhynchopyga steniptera Hampson, 1909

Species of moth

Rhynchopyga steniptera is a species of moth in the subfamily Arctiinae, endemic to Guyana.
