= Rhynchopyga xanthospila =

Scientific classification
- Kingdom: Animalia
- Phylum: Arthropoda
- Class: Insecta
- Order: Lepidoptera
- Superfamily: Noctuoidea
- Family: Erebidae
- Subfamily: Arctiinae
- Genus: Rhynchopyga
- Species: R. xanthospila

Binomial name
- Rhynchopyga xanthospila Hampson, 1898

Species of moth

Rhynchopyga xanthospila is a moth in the subfamily Arctiinae. It is found in Bolivia.
