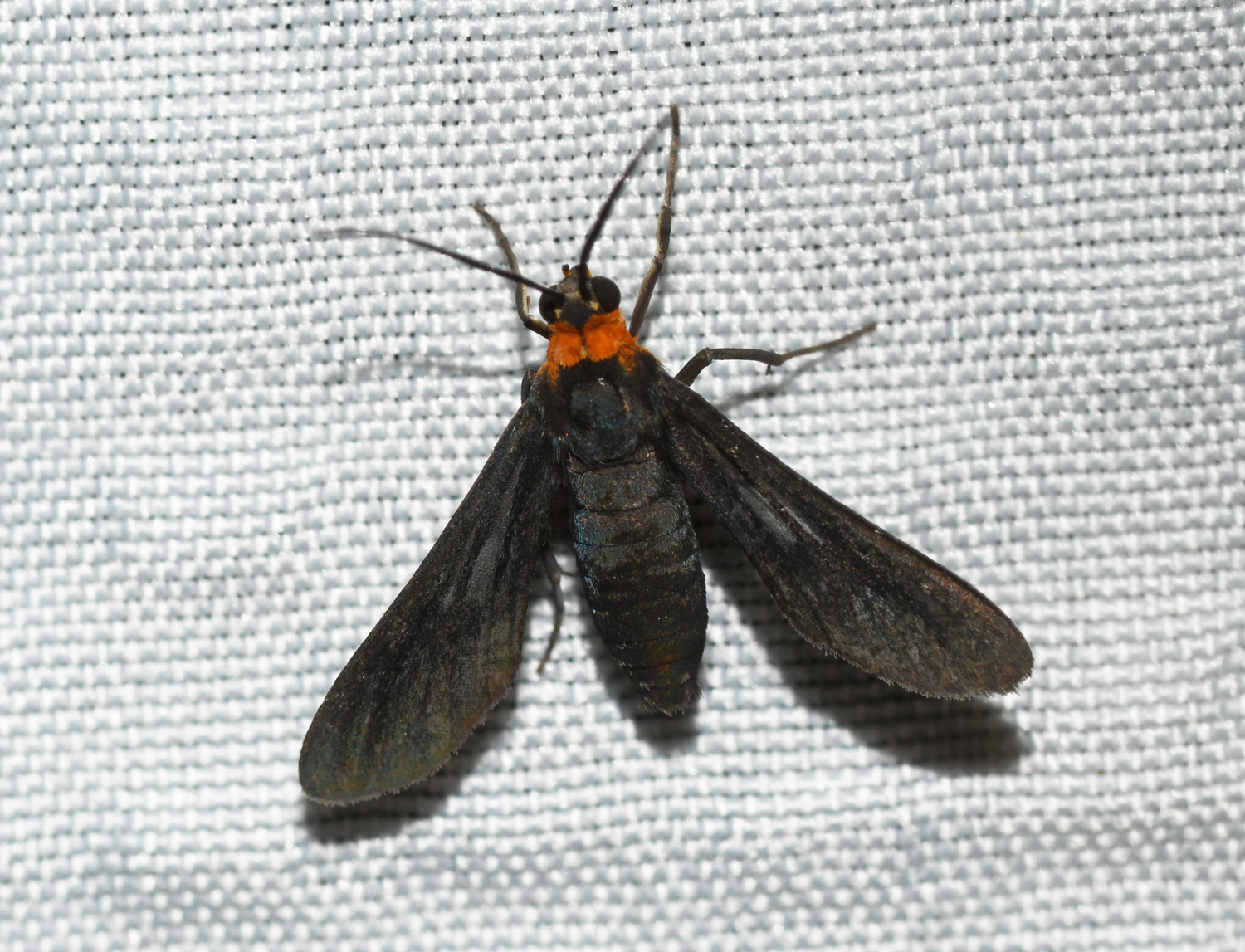

Scientific classification
- Domain: Eukaryota
- Kingdom: Animalia
- Phylum: Arthropoda
- Class: Insecta
- Order: Lepidoptera
- Superfamily: Noctuoidea
- Family: Erebidae
- Subfamily: Arctiinae
- Genus: Rhynchopyga
- Species: R. flavicollis

Binomial name
- Rhynchopyga flavicollis (H. Druce, 1884)

Synonyms
- Amycles flavicollis H. Druce, 1884

= Rhynchopyga flavicollis =

Species of moth

Rhynchopyga flavicollis is a species of moth in the subfamily Arctiinae. It is found in Guatemala.
