= Rhynchopyga braconida =

Scientific classification
- Domain: Eukaryota
- Kingdom: Animalia
- Phylum: Arthropoda
- Class: Insecta
- Order: Lepidoptera
- Superfamily: Noctuoidea
- Family: Erebidae
- Subfamily: Arctiinae
- Genus: Rhynchopyga
- Species: R. braconida

Binomial name
- Rhynchopyga braconida Kaye, 1911

Species of moth

Rhynchopyga braconida is a species of moth in the subfamily Arctiinae. It was described by William James Kaye in 1911. It is found in São Paulo, Brazil.
