= Rhynchopyga castra =

Scientific classification
- Domain: Eukaryota
- Kingdom: Animalia
- Phylum: Arthropoda
- Class: Insecta
- Order: Lepidoptera
- Superfamily: Noctuoidea
- Family: Erebidae
- Subfamily: Arctiinae
- Genus: Rhynchopyga
- Species: R. castra

Binomial name
- Rhynchopyga castra E. D. Jones, 1912

Species of moth

Rhynchopyga castra is a species of moth in the subfamily Arctiinae. It was described by E. Dukinfield Jones in 1912. It is found in Brazil.
