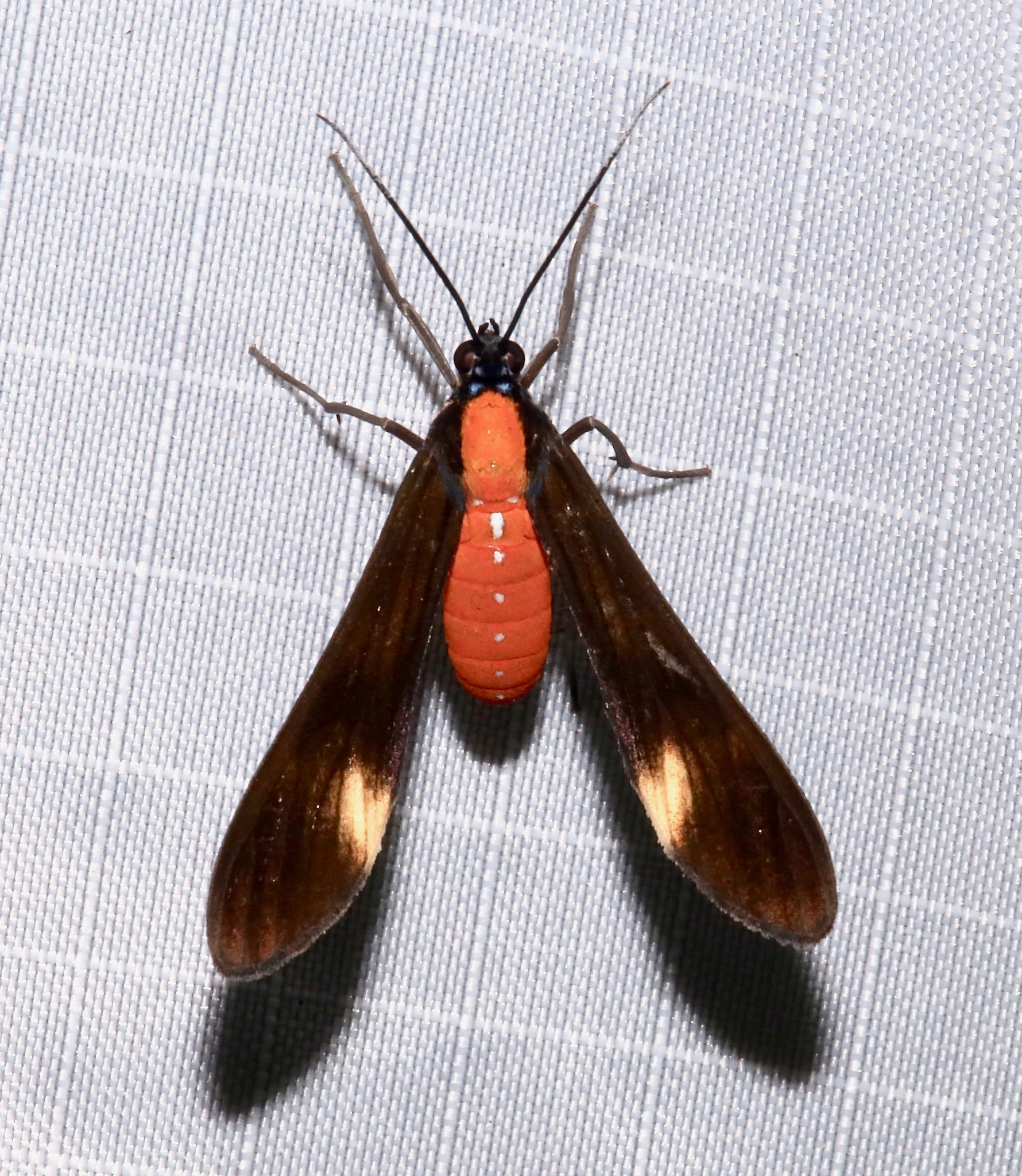

Scientific classification
- Domain: Eukaryota
- Kingdom: Animalia
- Phylum: Arthropoda
- Class: Insecta
- Order: Lepidoptera
- Superfamily: Noctuoidea
- Family: Erebidae
- Subfamily: Arctiinae
- Genus: Rhynchopyga
- Species: R. elongata

Binomial name
- Rhynchopyga elongata (Dognin, 1890)

Synonyms
- Chloropsinus elongata Dognin, 1890; Rhynchopyga elongata f. bifasciata Draudt, 1917

= Rhynchopyga elongata =

Species of moth

Rhynchopyga elongata is a species of moth in the subfamily Arctiinae. It is found in Ecuador.
