= Peritassa killipii =

Conservation status
- Vulnerable (IUCN 2.3)

Scientific classification
- Kingdom: Plantae
- Clade: Tracheophytes
- Clade: Angiosperms
- Clade: Eudicots
- Clade: Rosids
- Order: Celastrales
- Family: Celastraceae
- Genus: Peritassa
- Species: P. killipii

Binomial name
- Peritassa killipii A.C.Sm.

Species of plant

Peritassa killipii is a species of plant in the family Celastraceae. It is endemic to Peru.
