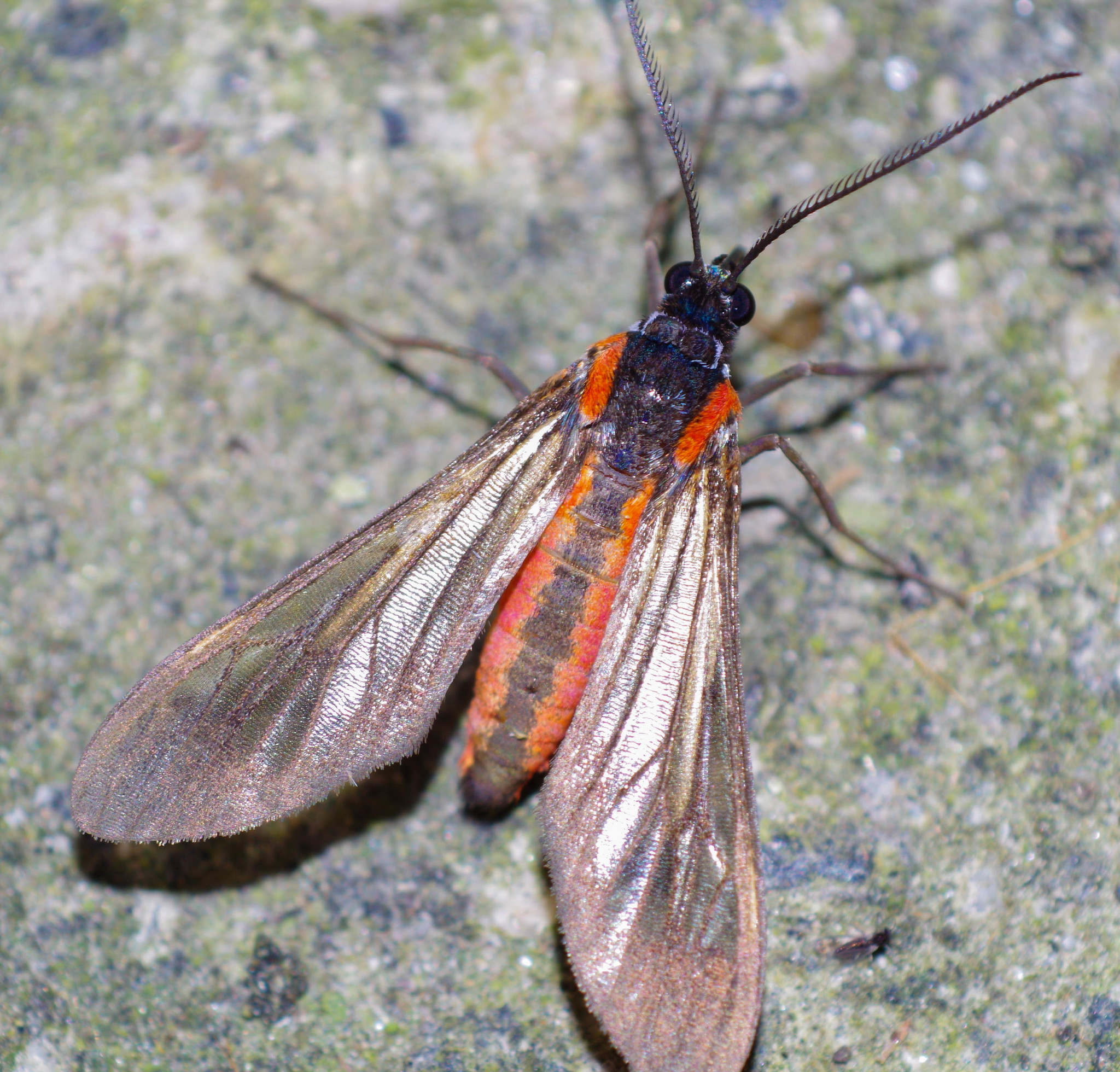

Scientific classification
- Domain: Eukaryota
- Kingdom: Animalia
- Phylum: Arthropoda
- Class: Insecta
- Order: Lepidoptera
- Superfamily: Noctuoidea
- Family: Erebidae
- Subfamily: Arctiinae
- Genus: Rhynchopyga
- Species: R. semirufa

Binomial name
- Rhynchopyga semirufa Druce, 1906

Synonyms
- Rhynchopyga semirufa subochrea Kaye, 1918

= Rhynchopyga semirufa =

Species of moth

Rhynchopyga semirufa is a species of moth in the subfamily Arctiinae. It is found in Peru.
