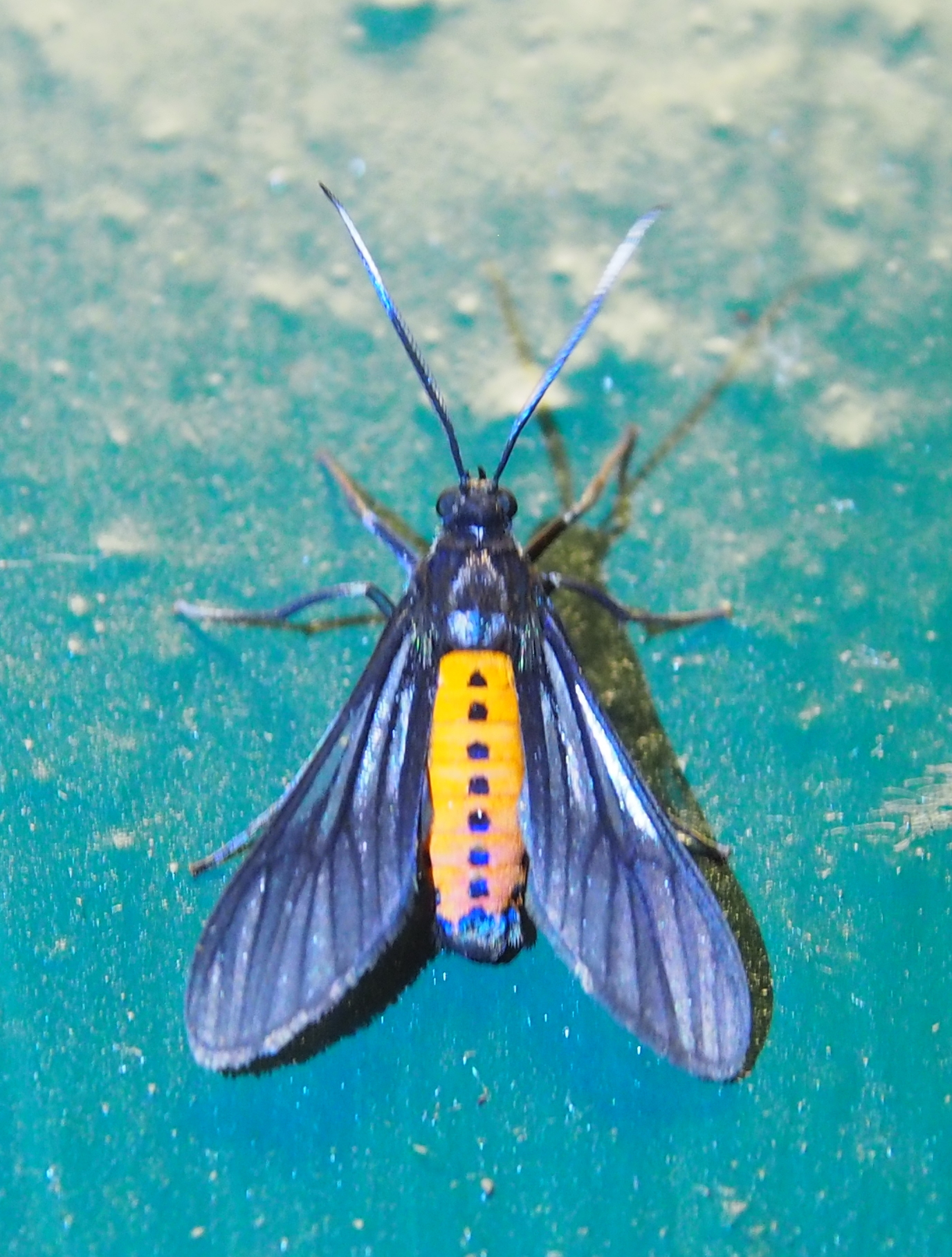

Scientific classification
- Domain: Eukaryota
- Kingdom: Animalia
- Phylum: Arthropoda
- Class: Insecta
- Order: Lepidoptera
- Superfamily: Noctuoidea
- Family: Erebidae
- Subfamily: Arctiinae
- Genus: Rhynchopyga
- Species: R. subflamma

Binomial name
- Rhynchopyga subflamma (H. Druce, 1884)

Synonyms
- Gymnopoda subflamma H. Druce, 1884

= Rhynchopyga subflamma =

Species of moth

Rhynchopyga subflamma is a species of moth in the subfamily Arctiinae. It is found in Panama and Costa Rica.
