= Rhynchopyga discalba =

Scientific classification
- Domain: Eukaryota
- Kingdom: Animalia
- Phylum: Arthropoda
- Class: Insecta
- Order: Lepidoptera
- Superfamily: Noctuoidea
- Family: Erebidae
- Subfamily: Arctiinae
- Genus: Rhynchopyga
- Species: R. discalba

Binomial name
- Rhynchopyga discalba Kaye, 1918

Species of moth

Rhynchopyga discalba is a species of moth in the subfamily Arctiinae. It was described by William James Kaye in 1918.
