= Rhynchopyga ichneumonea =

Scientific classification
- Domain: Eukaryota
- Kingdom: Animalia
- Phylum: Arthropoda
- Class: Insecta
- Order: Lepidoptera
- Superfamily: Noctuoidea
- Family: Erebidae
- Subfamily: Arctiinae
- Genus: Rhynchopyga
- Species: R. ichneumonea

Binomial name
- Rhynchopyga ichneumonea Felder, 1869

Species of moth

Rhynchopyga ichneumonea is a species of moth in the subfamily Arctiinae. It is found in Colombia.
