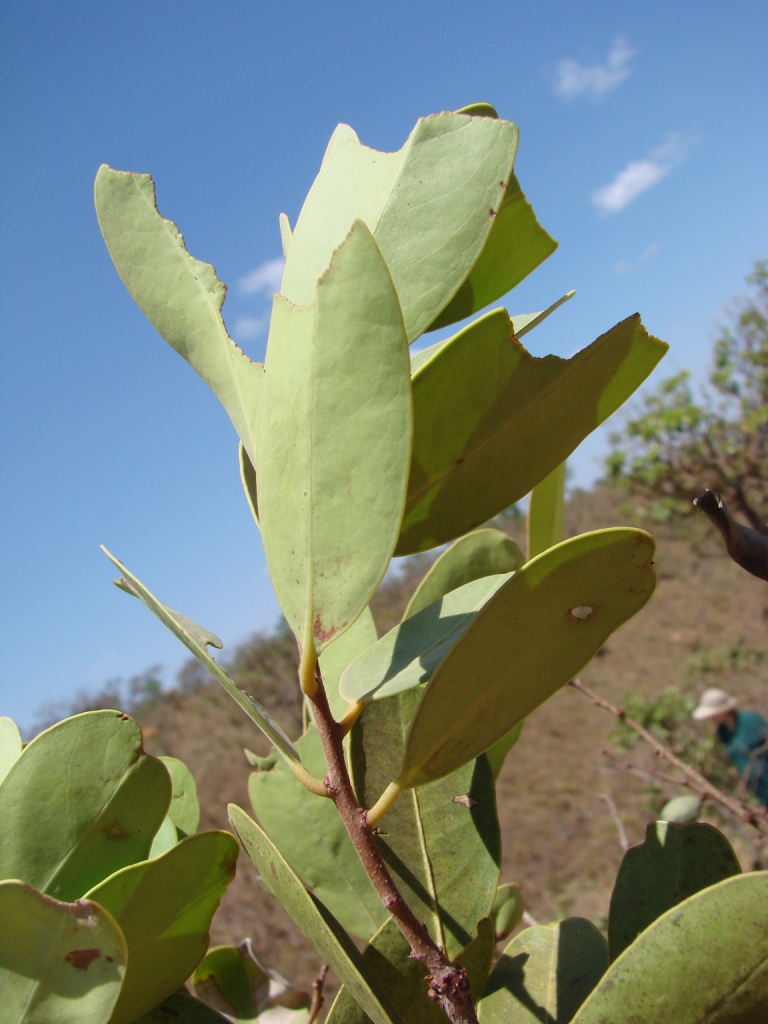
- Peritassa campestris

Scientific classification
- Kingdom: Plantae
- Clade: Tracheophytes
- Clade: Angiosperms
- Clade: Eudicots
- Clade: Rosids
- Order: Celastrales
- Family: Celastraceae
- Genus: Peritassa; Miers

Species
- 21; see text

Synonyms
- Sarcocampsa Miers (1872); Sicyomorpha Miers (1872)

= Peritassa =

Genus of flowering plants

Peritassa is a genus of flowering plants in the family Celastraceae. It includes 21 species native to the tropical Americas, ranging from Guatemala to Paraguay and southern Brazil.

== Species ==
The species in the genus Peritassa are:

- Peritassa bullata A.C.Sm.
- Peritassa calypsoides (Cambess.) A.C.Sm.
- Peritassa campestris (Cambess.) A.C.Sm.
- Peritassa compta Miers
- Peritassa dulcis (Benth.) Miers
- Peritassa flaviflora A.C.Sm.
- Peritassa formidolosa Lombardi
- Peritassa glabra (A.C.Sm.) Lombardi
- Peritassa hatschbachii Lombardi
- Peritassa huanucana (Loes.) A.C.Sm.
- Peritassa killipii A.C.Sm.
- Peritassa laevigata (Hoffmanns. ex Link) A.C.Sm.
- Peritassa longifolia Lombardi
- Peritassa manaoara Lombardi
- Peritassa mexiae A.C.Sm.
- Peritassa myrsinoides (A.C.Sm.) Lombardi
- Peritassa nectandrifolia (A.C.Sm.) Lombardi
- Peritassa peruviana (Miers) A.C.Sm.
- Peritassa petiolata (A.C.Sm.) Lombardi
- Peritassa pruinosa (Seem.) A.C.Sm.
- Peritassa sadleri Lombardi
