= List of Celastrales of South Africa =

Flowering plants in the order Celastrales recorded from South Africa

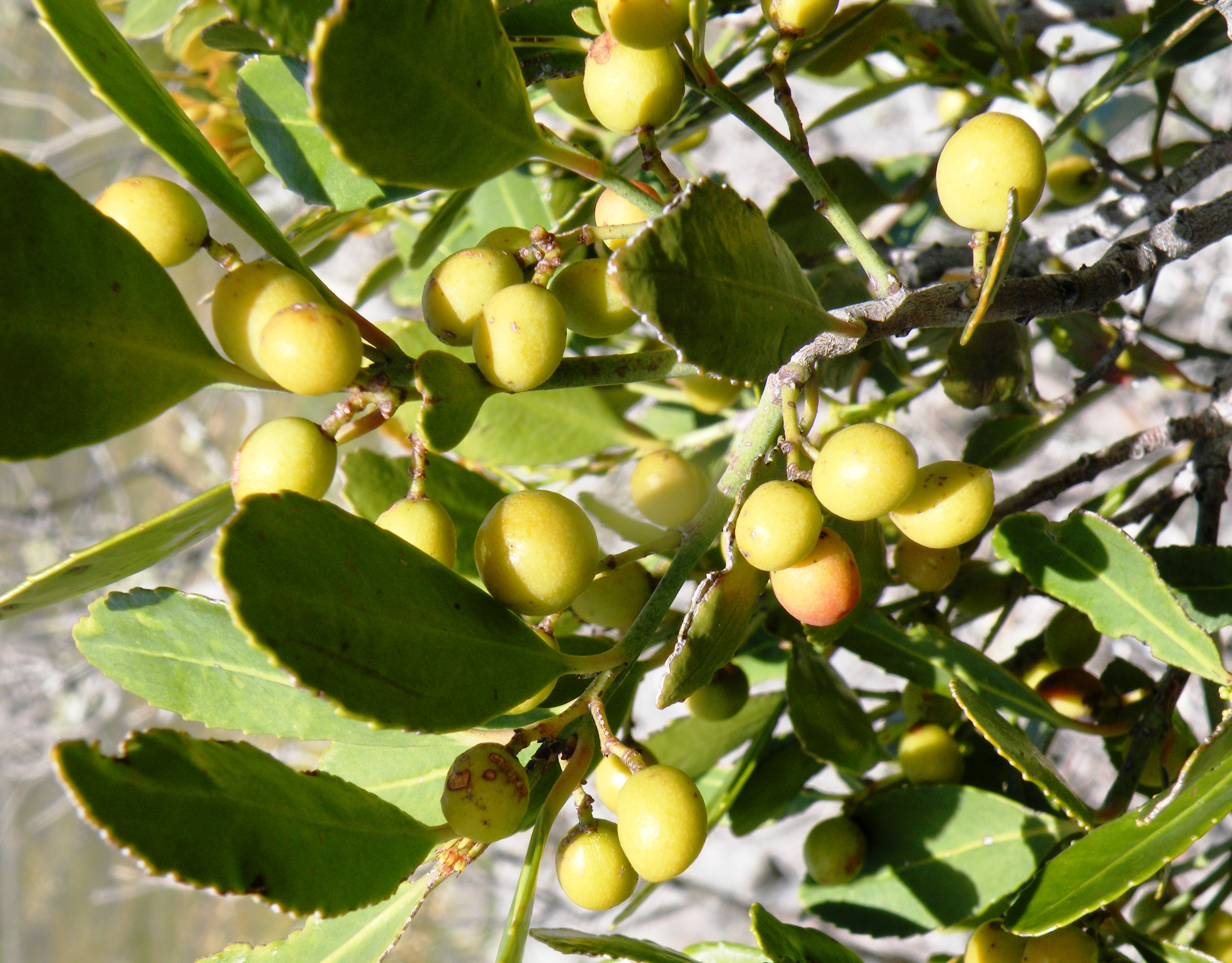
Cassine schinoides (Spreng.) R.H.Archer, endemic to South Africa

The Celastrales are an order of flowering plants found throughout the tropics and subtropics, with only a few species extending far into the temperate regions. The 1200 to 1350 species are in about 100 genera. All but seven of these genera are in the large family Celastraceae. The anthophytes are a grouping of plant taxa bearing flower-like reproductive structures. They were formerly thought to be a clade comprising plants bearing flower-like structures. The group contained the angiosperms – the extant flowering plants, such as roses and grasses – as well as the Gnetales and the extinct Bennettitales.

23,420 species of vascular plant have been recorded in South Africa, making it the sixth most species-rich country in the world and the most species-rich country on the African continent. Of these, 153 species are considered to be threatened. Nine biomes have been described in South Africa: Fynbos, Succulent Karoo, desert, Nama Karoo, grassland, savanna, Albany thickets, the Indian Ocean coastal belt, and forests.

The 2018 South African National Biodiversity Institute's National Biodiversity Assessment plant checklist lists 35,130 taxa in the phyla Anthocerotophyta (hornworts (6)), Anthophyta (flowering plants (33534)), Bryophyta (mosses (685)), Cycadophyta (cycads (42)), Lycopodiophyta (Lycophytes(45)), Marchantiophyta (liverworts (376)), Pinophyta (conifers (33)), and Pteridophyta (cryptogams (408)).

One family is represented in the literature. Listed taxa include species, subspecies, varieties, and forms as recorded, some of which have subsequently been allocated to other taxa as synonyms, in which cases the accepted taxon is appended to the listing. Multiple entries under alternative names reflect taxonomic revision over time.

== Celastraceae ==
Family Celastraceae

=== Allocassine ===
Genus Allocassine:

- Allocassine laurifolia (Harv.) N.Robson, indigenous

=== Cassine ===
Genus Cassine:

- Cassine aethiopica Thunb. accepted as Mystroxylon aethiopicum (Thunb.) Loes. subsp. aethiopicum, present
- Cassine barbara L. accepted as Cassine peragua L. subsp. barbara (L.) R.H.Archer, present
- Cassine burkeana (Sond.) Kuntze, accepted as Mystroxylon aethiopicum (Thunb.) Loes. subsp. burkeanum (Sond.) R.H.Archer, present
- Cassine crocea (Thunb.) Kuntze, accepted as Elaeodendron croceum (Thunb.) DC. present
- Cassine eucleiformis (Eckl. & Zeyh.) Kuntze, accepted as Robsonodendron eucleiforme (Eckl. & Zeyh.) R.H.Archer, present
- Cassine maritima (Bolus) F.Bolus & L.Bolus, accepted as Robsonodendron maritimum (Bolus) R.H.Archer, present
- Cassine matabelicum (Loes.) Steedman, accepted as Elaeodendron matabelicum Loes.
- Cassine papillosa (Hochst.) Kuntze, accepted as Elaeodendron croceum (Thunb.) DC. present
- Cassine parvifolia Sond., endemic
- Cassine peragua L. indigenous
  - Cassine peragua L. subsp. affinis (Sond.) R.H.Archer, endemic
  - Cassine peragua L. subsp. barbara (L.) R.H.Archer, endemic
  - Cassine peragua L. subsp. peragua, indigenous
- Cassine reticulata (Eckl. & Zeyh.) Codd, accepted as Lauridia reticulata Eckl. & Zeyh. present
- Cassine stuhlmannii (Loes.) Blakelock, accepted as Elaeodendron schlechterianum (Loes.) Loes. present
- Cassine tetragona (L.f.) Druce, accepted as Lauridia tetragona (L.f.) R.H.Archer, present
  - Cassine tetragona (L.f.) Loes., accepted as Lauridia tetragona (L.f.) R.H.Archer, present
  - Cassine tetragona (Thunb.) Loes., accepted as Lauridia tetragona (L.f.) R.H.Archer, present
- Cassine transvaalensis (Burtt Davy) Codd, accepted as Elaeodendron transvaalense (Burtt Davy) R.H.Archer, present

=== Catha ===
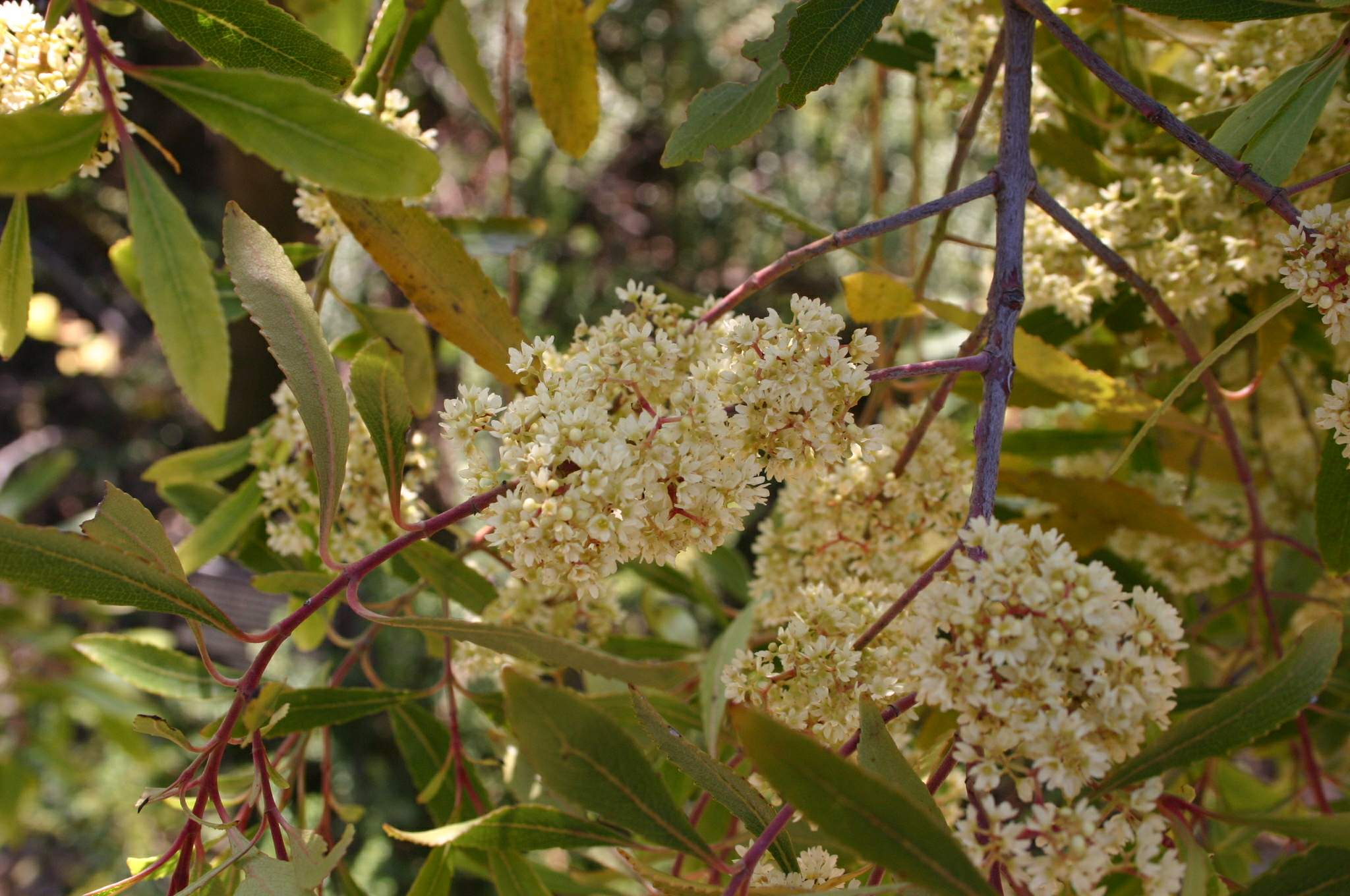
Catha edulis (Vahl) Forssk. ex Endl.

Genus Catha:

- Catha abbottii A.E.van Wyk & M.Prins, accepted as Lydenburgia abbottii (A.E.van Wyk & M.Prins) Steenkamp, A.E.van Wyk & M.Prins, present
- Catha campestris (Eckl. & Zeyh.) C.Presl, accepted as Putterlickia pyracantha (L.) Szyszyl. indigenous
- Catha edulis (Vahl) Forssk. ex Endl. indigenous
- Catha transvaalensis Codd, accepted as Lydenburgia cassinoides N.Robson, present

=== Celastrus ===
Genus Celastrus:

- Celastrus campestris Eckl. & Zeyh. accepted as Putterlickia pyracantha (L.) Szyszyl. indigenous
- Celastrus obtusus Thunb. accepted as Putterlickia pyracantha (L.) Szyszyl. indigenous
- Celastrus pyracanthus L. accepted as Putterlickia pyracantha (L.) Szyszyl. endemic
- Celastrus saxatilis Burch. accepted as Putterlickia saxatilis (Burch.) Jordaan, endemic
- Celastrus tetragonus Thunb. accepted as Lauridia tetragona (L.f.) R.H.Archer, present
- Celastrus verrucosus Sond. accepted as Putterlickia verrucosa (E.Mey. ex Sond.) Szyszyl. endemic

=== Elachyptera ===
Genus Elachyptera:

- Elachyptera parvifolia (Oliv.) N.Halle, indigenous

=== Elaeodendron ===
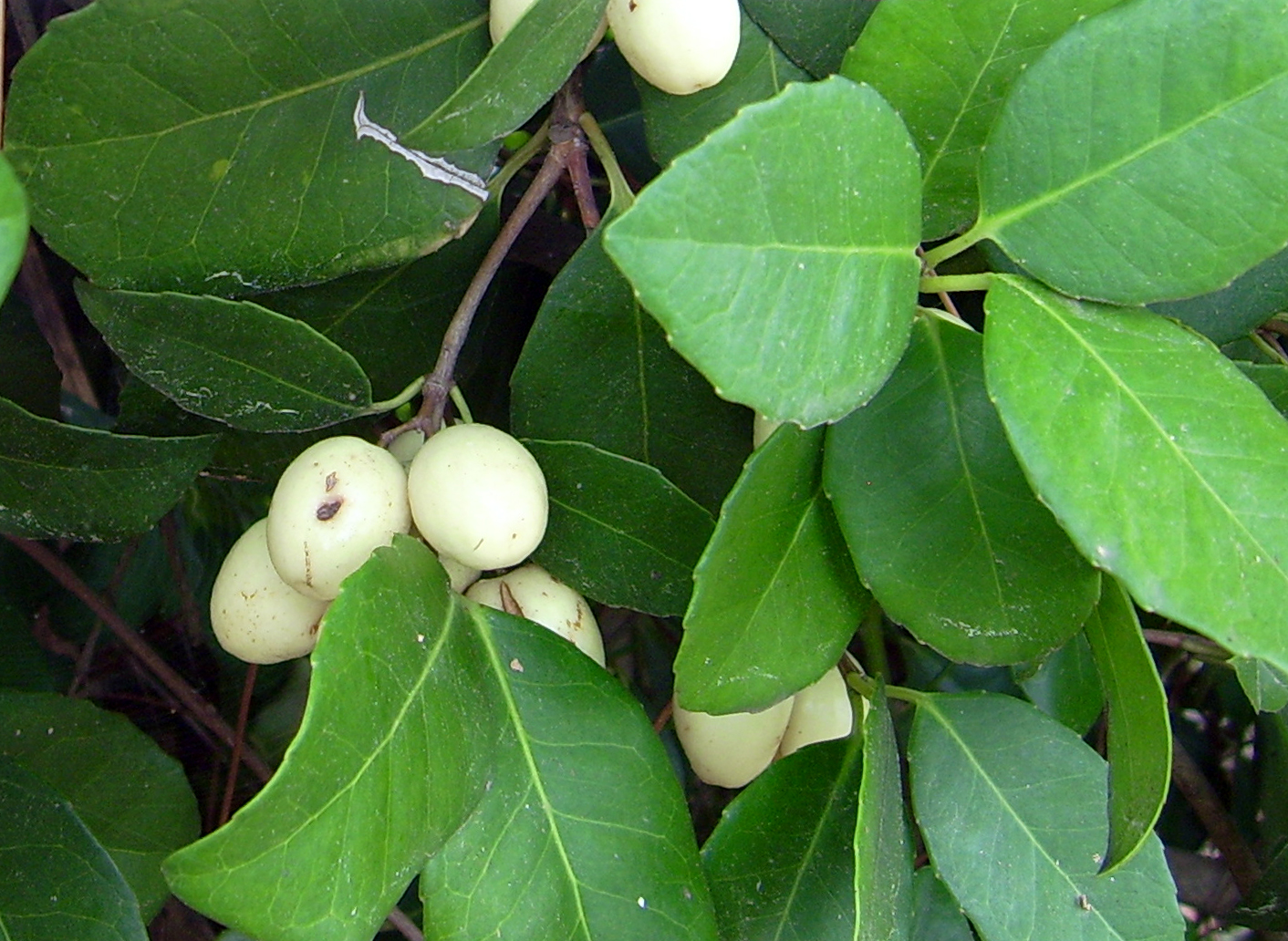
Elaeodendron croceum (Thunb.) DC.

Genus Elaeodendron:

- Elaeodendron croceum (Thunb.) DC. indigenous
- Elaeodendron schinoides Spreng. endemic to Cape Provinces
- Elaeodendron transvaalense (Burtt Davy) R.H.Archer, indigenous
- Elaeodendron zeyheri Spreng. ex Turcz. indigenous

=== Empleuridium ===
Genus Empleuridium:

- Empleuridium juniperinum Sond. endemic

=== Gloveria ===
Genus Gloveria:

- Gloveria integrifolia (L.f.) Jordaan, endemic

=== Gymnosporia ===
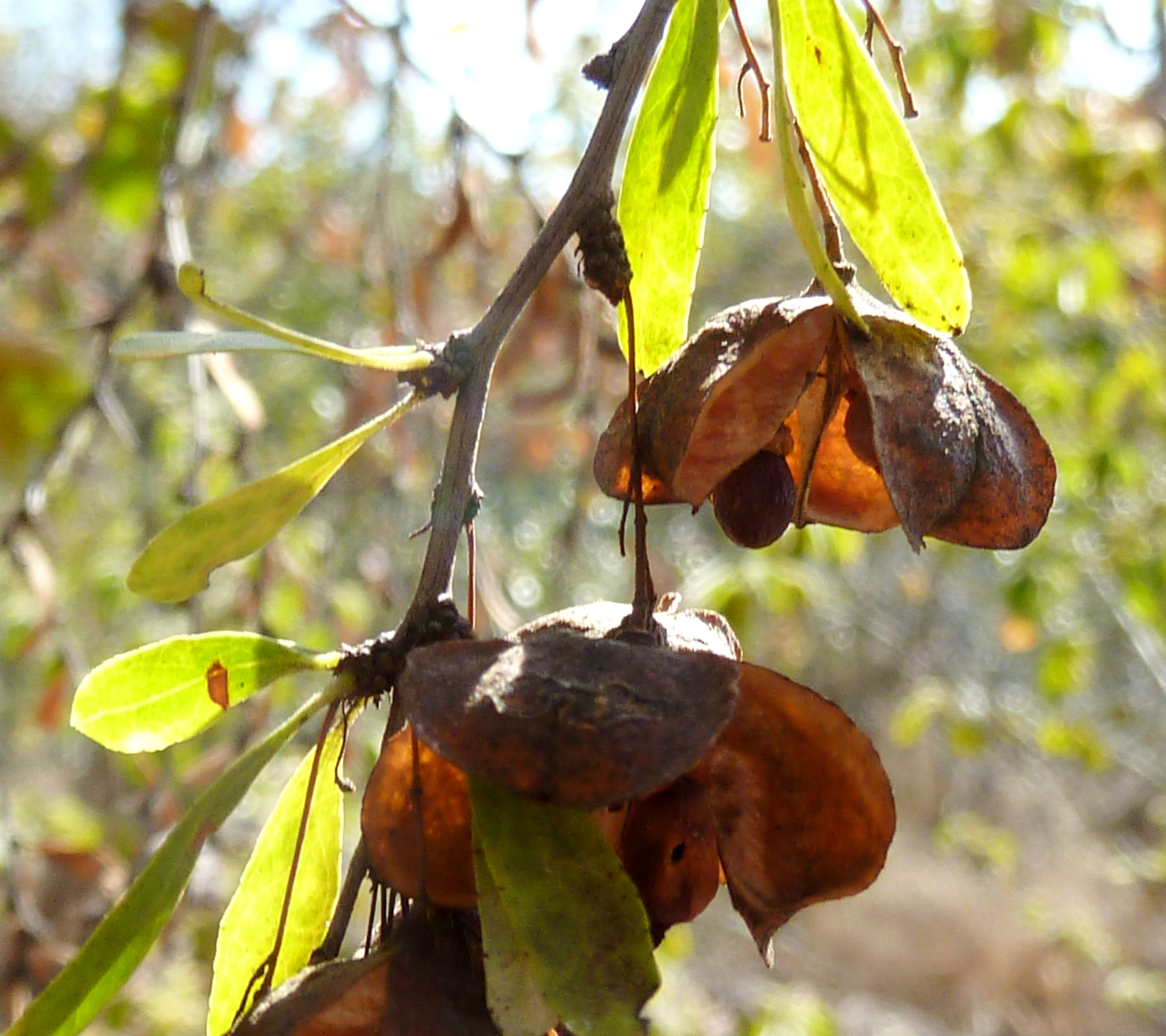
Gymnosporia heterophylla (Eckl. & Zeyh.) Loes.

Genus Gymnosporia:

- Gymnosporia angularis (Sond.) Sim, accepted as Gymnosporia heterophylla (Eckl. & Zeyh.) Loes. present
  - Gymnosporia angularis (Sond.) Sim var. grandifolia Davison, accepted as Gymnosporia grandifolia (Davison) Jordaan, present
  - Gymnosporia angularis (Sond.) Sim var. orbiculata Davison, indigenous
- Gymnosporia arenicola Jordaan, indigenous
- Gymnosporia bachmannii Loes. endemic
- Gymnosporia buxifolia (L.) Szyszyl. indigenous
- Gymnosporia capitata (E.Mey. ex Sond.) Loes. endemic
- Gymnosporia crataegiflora Davidson, accepted as Gymnosporia woodii Szyszyl. present
- Gymnosporia devenishii Jordaan, endemic
- Gymnosporia elliptica (Thunb.) Schonland, endemic
- Gymnosporia filiformis Davidson, endemic
- Gymnosporia gariepensis Jordaan, indigenous
- Gymnosporia glaucophylla Jordaan, indigenous
- Gymnosporia grandifolia (Davison) Jordaan, indigenous
- Gymnosporia graniticola Jordaan, accepted as Gymnosporia swazica Jordaan
- Gymnosporia harveyana Loes. indigenous
  - Gymnosporia harveyana Loes. subsp. harveyana, indigenous
- Gymnosporia hemipterocarpa Jordaan, indigenous
- Gymnosporia heterophylla (Eckl. & Zeyh.) Loes. indigenous
- Gymnosporia linearis (L.f.) Loes. indigenous
  - Gymnosporia linearis (L.f.) Loes. subsp. lanceolata (E.Mey. ex Sond.) Jordaan, indigenous
  - Gymnosporia linearis (L.f.) Loes. subsp. linearis, endemic
- Gymnosporia macrocarpa Jordaan, endemic
- Gymnosporia maranguensis (Loes.) Loes. indigenous
- Gymnosporia markwardii Jordaan, indigenous
- Gymnosporia mossambicensis (Klotzsch) Loes. indigenous
  - Gymnosporia mossambicensis (Klotzsch) Loes. var. rubra (Harv.) Loes. indigenous
- Gymnosporia nemorosa (Eckl. & Zeyh.) Szyszyl. indigenous
- Gymnosporia oxycarpa (N.Robson) Jordaan, indigenous
- Gymnosporia polyacantha (Sond.) Szyszyl. endemic
  - Gymnosporia polyacantha (Sond.) Szyszyl. subsp. polyacantha, endemic
  - Gymnosporia polyacantha (Sond.) Szyszyl. subsp. vaccinifolia (P.Conrath) Jordaan, endemic
- Gymnosporia pubescens (N.Robson) Jordaan, indigenous
- Gymnosporia putterlickioides Loes., indigenous
  - Gymnosporia putterlickioides Loes. subsp. putterlickioides, indigenous
- Gymnosporia rubra (Harv.) Loes. endemic
- Gymnosporia saxatilis (Burch.) Davison, accepted as Putterlickia saxatilis (Burch.) Jordaan, endemic
- Gymnosporia senegalensis (Lam.) Loes. indigenous
- Gymnosporia swazica Jordaan, indigenous
- Gymnosporia tenuispina (Sond.) Szyszyl. indigenous
- Gymnosporia uniflora Davison, indigenous
- Gymnosporia vanwykii (R.H.Archer) Jordaan, endemic
- Gymnosporia woodii Szyszyl. endemic

=== Hippocratea ===
Genus Hippocratea:

- Hippocratea africana (Willd.) Loes. accepted as Loeseneriella africana (Willd.) N.Halle var. africana, present
  - Hippocratea africana (Willd.) Loes. var. richardiana (Cambess.) N.Robson, accepted as Loeseneriella africana (Willd.) N.Halle var. richardiana (Cambess.) N.Halle, present
- Hippocratea buchananii Loes. accepted as Reissantia buchananii (Loes.) N.Halle
- Hippocratea crenata (Klotzsch) K.Schum. & Loes. accepted as Loeseneriella crenata (Klotzsch) R.Wilczek ex N.Halle var. crenata, present
- Hippocratea delagoensis Loes. accepted as Prionostemma delagoensis (Loes.) N.Halle var. delagoensis, present
- Hippocratea indica Willd. accepted as Reissantia indica (Willd.) N.Halle var. orientalis N.Halle & B.Mathew, present
- Hippocratea longipetiolata Oliv. accepted as Pristimera longipetiolata (Oliv.) N.Halle, present
- Hippocratea parviflora N.E.Br. accepted as Reissantia parviflora (N.E.Br.) N.Halle
- Hippocratea parvifolia Oliv. accepted as Elachyptera parvifolia (Oliv.) N.Halle, present
- Hippocratea schlechteri Loes. var. peglerae Loes. accepted as Pristimera bojeri (Tul.) N.Halle, present

=== Lauridia ===
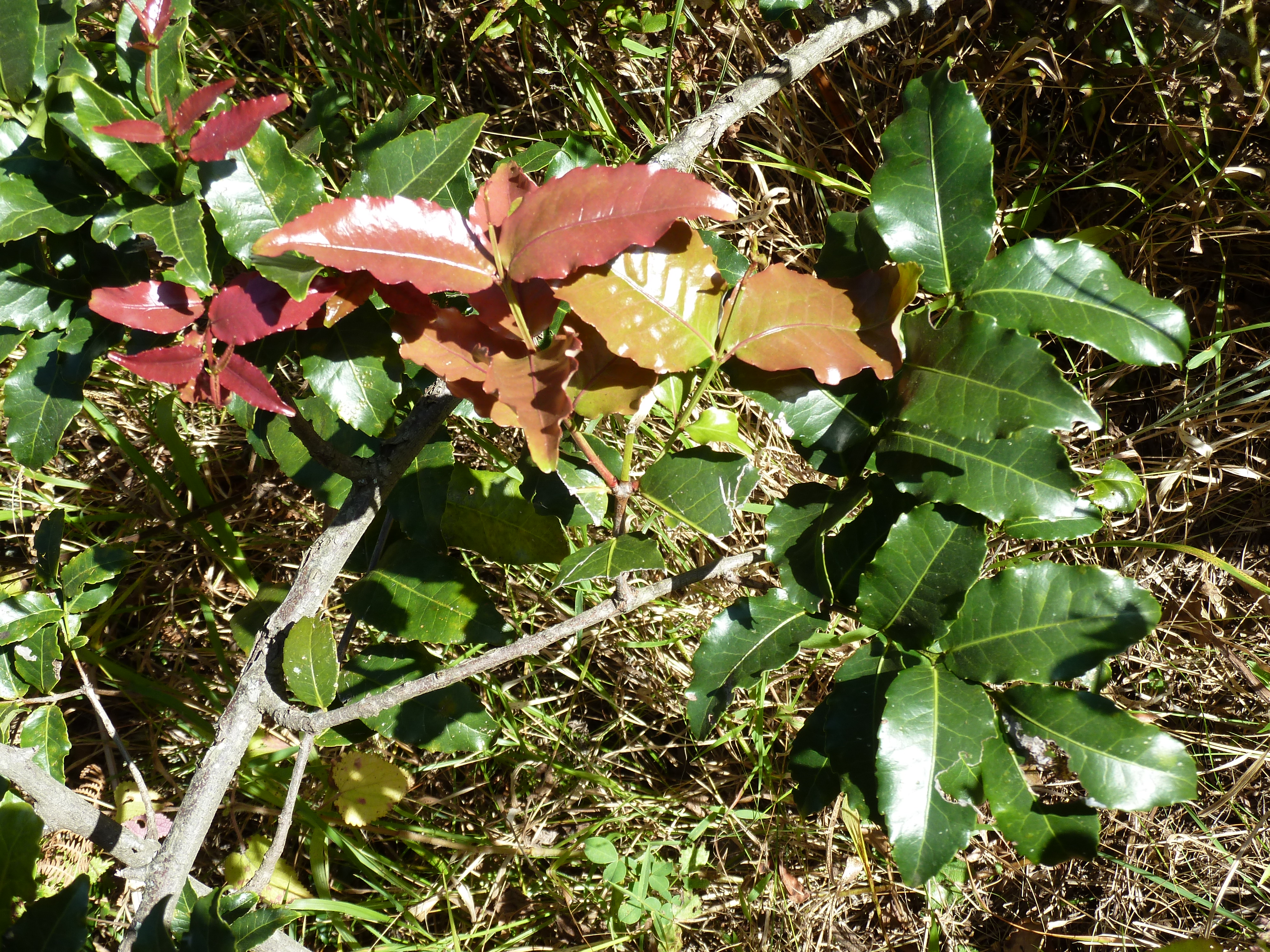
Lauridia tetragona (L.f.) R.H.Archer

Genus Lauridia:

- Lauridia reticulata Eckl. & Zeyh. endemic
- Lauridia rupicola Eckl. & Zeyh. accepted as Lauridia reticulata Eckl. & Zeyh. present
- Lauridia tetragona (L.f.) R.H.Archer, indigenous

=== Loeseneriella ===
Genus Loeseneriella:

- Loeseneriella africana (Willd.) N.Halle, indigenous
- Loeseneriella africana (Willd.) N.Halle var. richardiana (Cambess.) N.Halle, indigenous
- Loeseneriella crenata (Klotzsch) R.Wilczek ex N.Halle, indigenous
  - Loeseneriella crenata (Klotzsch) R.Wilczek ex N.Halle var. crenata, indigenous

=== Lydenburgia ===
Genus Lydenburgia:

- Lydenburgia abbottii (A.E.van Wyk & M.Prins) Steenkamp, A.E.van Wyk & M.Prins, endemic
- Lydenburgia cassinoides N.Robson, endemic

=== Maurocenia ===
Genus Maurocenia:

- Maurocenia frangula Mill. endemic
- Maurocenia frangularia Willd., accepted as Maurocenia frangula Mill. endemic

=== Maytenus ===
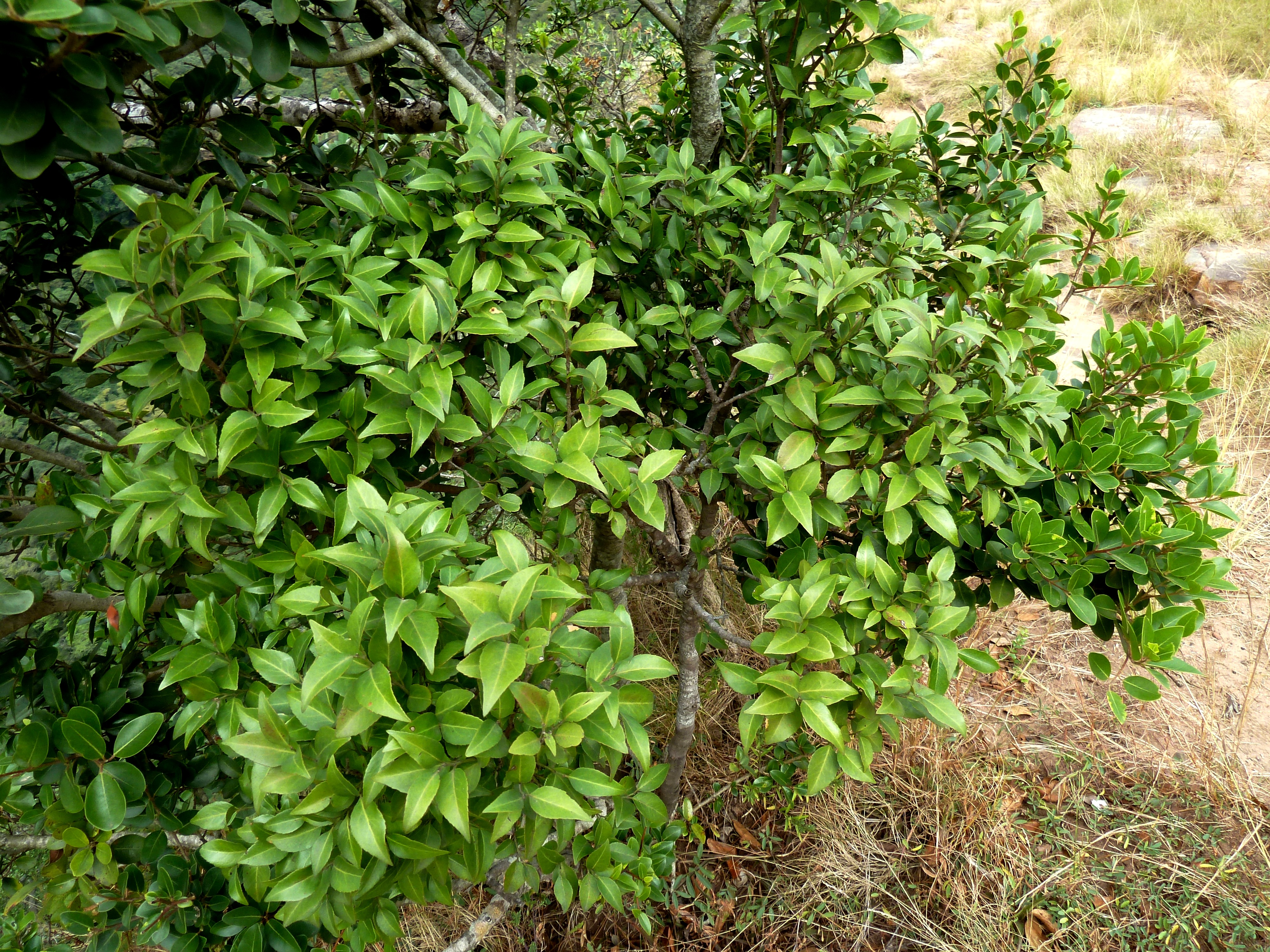
Maytenus acuminata (L.f.) Loes.

Genus Maytenus:

- Maytenus abbottii A.E.van Wyk, endemic
- Maytenus acuminata (L.f.) Loes. indigenous
  - Maytenus acuminata (L.f.) Loes. var. acuminata, indigenous
- Maytenus albata (N.E.Br.) E.Schmidt bis & Jordaan, indigenous
- Maytenus bachmannii (Loes.) Marais, accepted as Gymnosporia bachmannii Loes. present
- Maytenus capitata (E.Mey. ex Sond.) Marais, accepted as Gymnosporia capitata (E.Mey. ex Sond.) Loes. present
- Maytenus cordata (E.Mey. ex Sond.) Loes. endemic
- Maytenus deflexa (Sprague) E.Schmidt bis & Jordaan, endemic
- Maytenus heterophylla (Eckl. & Zeyh.) N.Robson subsp. glauca N.Robson, accepted as Gymnosporia glaucophylla Jordaan, present
- Maytenus ilicina (Burch.) Loes. endemic
- Maytenus lucida (L.) Loes. endemic
- Maytenus monococca (Davison) Loes. endemic
- Maytenus mossambicensis (Klotzsch) Blakelock, accepted as Gymnosporia mossambicensis (Klotzsch) Loes. indigenous
  - Maytenus mossambicensis (Klotzsch) Blakelock var. rubra (Harv.) Blakelock, accepted as Gymnosporia rubra (Harv.) Loes. present
- Maytenus nemorosa (Eckl. & Zeyh.) Marais, accepted as Gymnosporia nemorosa (Eckl. & Zeyh.) Szyszyl. present
- Maytenus oleoides (Lam.) Loes. endemic
- Maytenus oleosa A.E.van Wyk & R.H.Archer, endemic
- Maytenus oxycarpa N.Robson, accepted as Gymnosporia oxycarpa (N.Robson) Jordaan, present
- Maytenus peduncularis (Sond.) Loes. indigenous
- Maytenus polyacantha (Sond.) Marais, accepted as Gymnosporia polyacantha (Sond.) Szyszyl. indigenous
- Maytenus procumbens (L.f.) Loes. indigenous
- Maytenus pubescens N.Robson, accepted as Gymnosporia pubescens (N.Robson) Jordaan, present
- Maytenus putterlickioides (Loes.) Exell & MendonÃ§a, accepted as Gymnosporia putterlickioides Loes. subsp. putterlickioides, present
- Maytenus senegalensis (Lam.) Exell, accepted as Gymnosporia senegalensis (Lam.) Loes. present
- Maytenus tenuispina (Sond.) Marais, accepted as Gymnosporia tenuispina (Sond.) Szyszyl. present
- Maytenus undata (Thunb.) Blakelock, indigenous
- Maytenus vanwykii R.H.Archer, accepted as Gymnosporia vanwykii (R.H.Archer) Jordaan, present

=== Mystroxylon ===
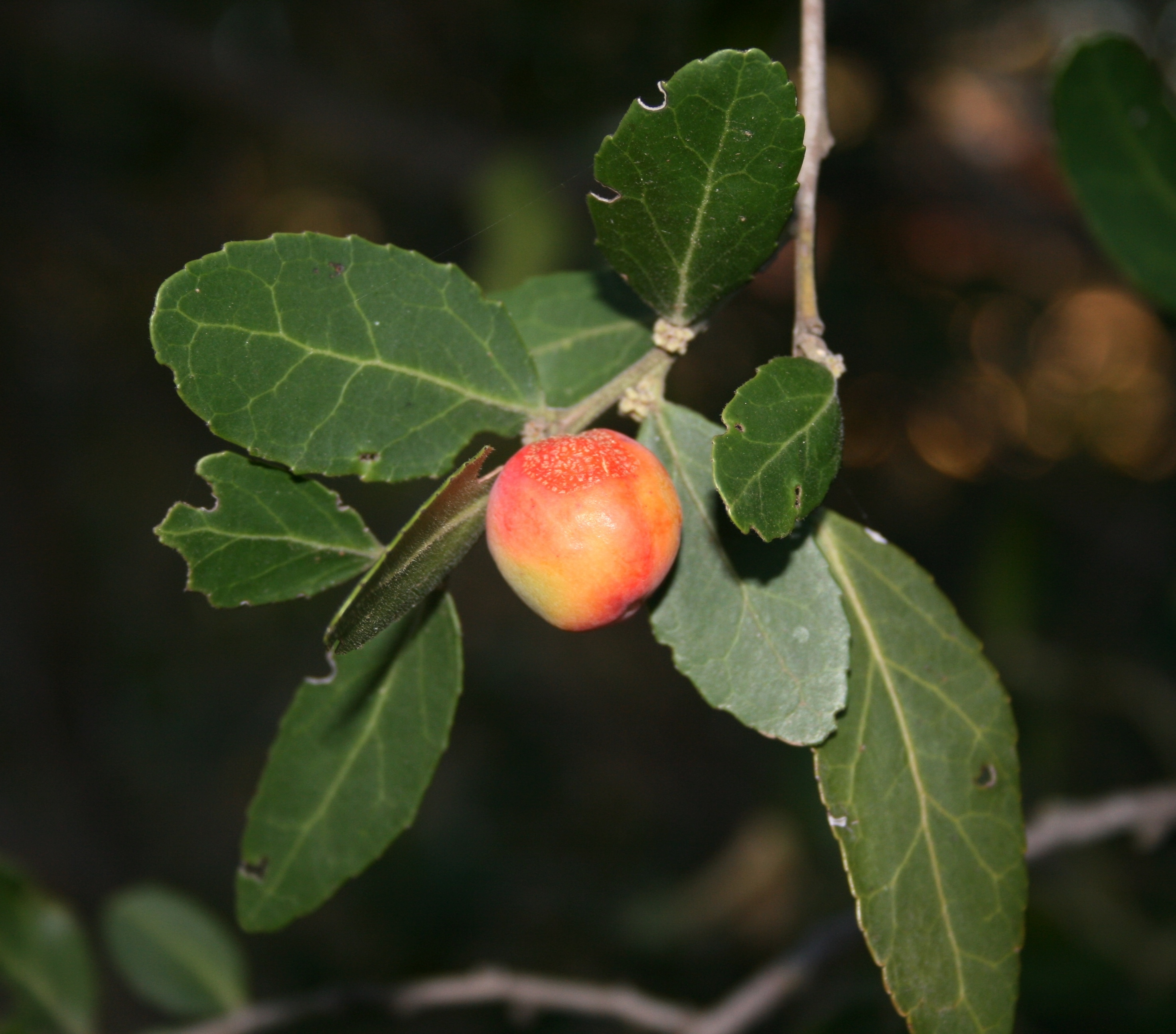
Mystroxylon aethiopicum subsp. schlechteri (Loes.) R.H.Archer

Genus Mystroxylon:

- Mystroxylon aethiopicum (Thunb.) Loes. indigenous
  - Mystroxylon aethiopicum (Thunb.) Loes. subsp. aethiopicum, endemic
  - Mystroxylon aethiopicum (Thunb.) Loes. subsp. burkeanum (Sond.) R.H.Archer, endemic
  - Mystroxylon aethiopicum (Thunb.) Loes. subsp. schlechteri (Loes.) R.H.Archer, indigenous
- Mystroxylon pubescens Eckl. & Zeyh. accepted as Mystroxylon aethiopicum (Thunb.) Loes. subsp. aethiopicum, present
- Mystroxylon reticulatum (Eckl. & Zeyh.) D.Dietr. accepted as Lauridia reticulata Eckl. & Zeyh. present

=== Pleurostylia ===
Genus Pleurostylia:

- Pleurostylia capensis (Turcz.) Loes. indigenous

=== Prionostemma ===
Genus Prionostemma:

- Prionostemma delagoensis (Loes.) N.Halle, indigenous
  - Prionostemma delagoensis (Loes.) N.Halle var. delagoensis, endemic

=== Pristimera ===
Genus Pristimera:

- Pristimera bojeri (Tul.) N.Halle, indigenous
- Pristimera delagoensis (Loes.) R.H.Archer, indigenous
  - Pristimera delagoensis (Loes.) R.H.Archer var. delagoensis, indigenous
- Pristimera longipetiolata (Oliv.) N.Halle, indigenous

=== Pseudosalacia ===
Genus Pseudosalacia:

- Pseudosalacia streyi Codd, endemic

=== Pterocelastrus ===
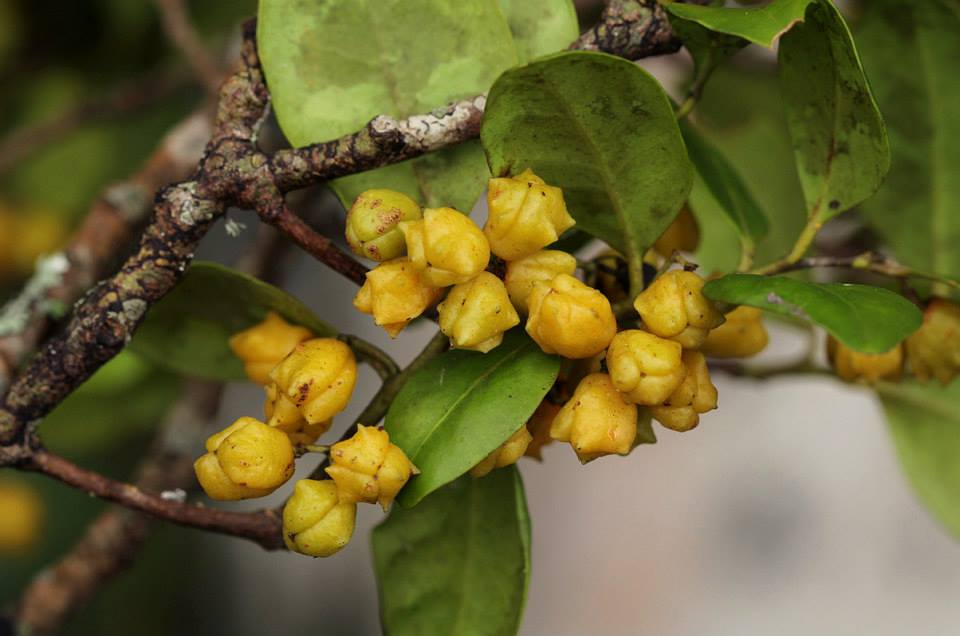
Pterocelastrus echinatus N.E.Br.

Genus Pterocelastrus:

- Pterocelastrus echinatus N.E.Br. indigenous
- Pterocelastrus galpinii Loes. indigenous
- Pterocelastrus rostratus (Thunb.) Walp. indigenous
- Pterocelastrus tricuspidatus (Lam.) Walp. endemic

=== Putterlickia ===
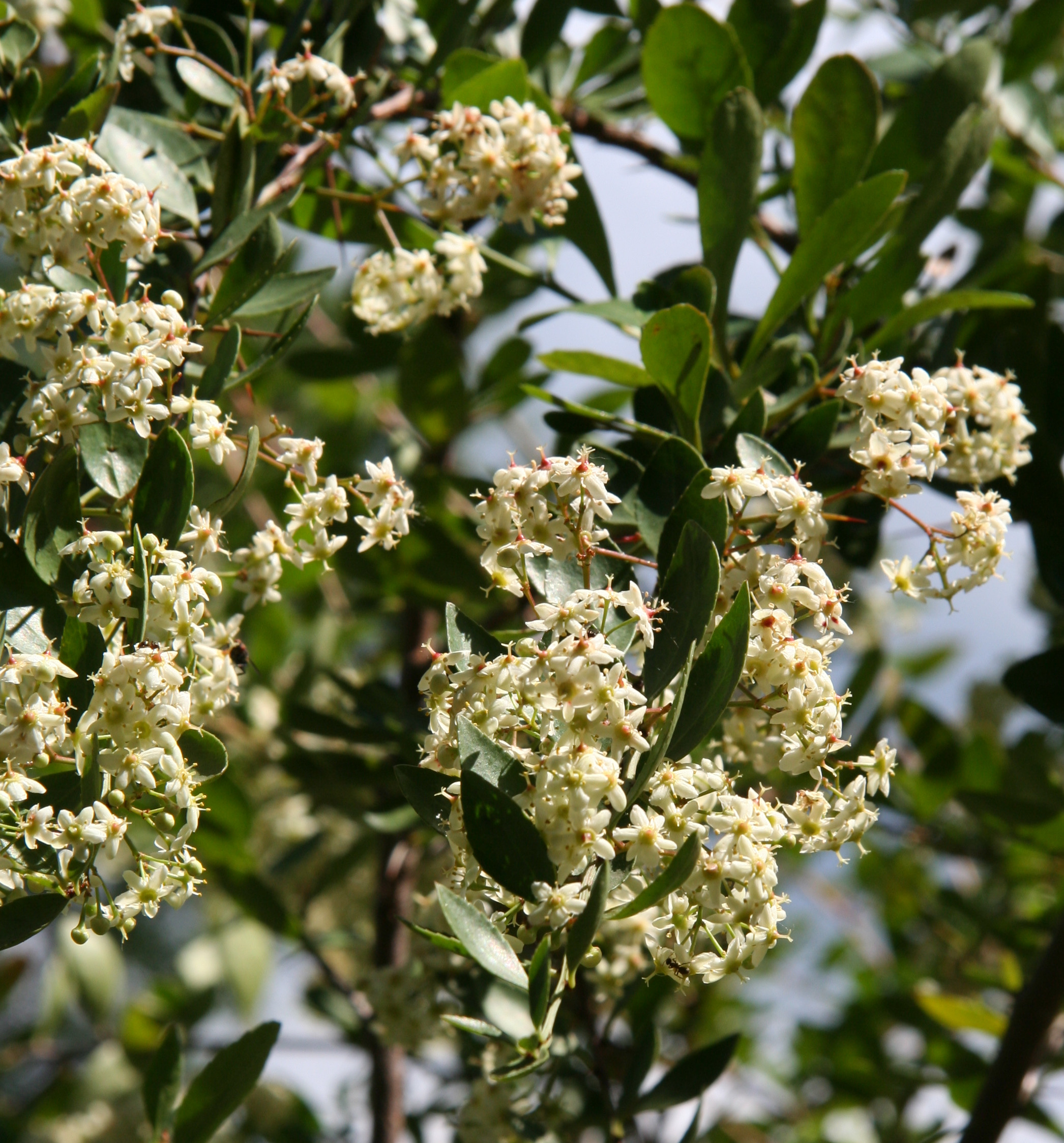
Putterlickia pyracantha (L.) Szyszyl. endemic

Genus Putterlickia:

- Putterlickia neglecta Jordaan, R.G.C.Boon & A.E.van Wyk, indigenous
- Putterlickia pyracantha (L.) Szyszyl. endemic
- Putterlickia retrospinosa A.E.van Wyk & Mostert, endemic
- Putterlickia saxatilis (Burch.) Jordaan, endemic
- Putterlickia verrucosa (E.Mey. ex Sond.) Szyszyl. indigenous

=== Reissantia ===
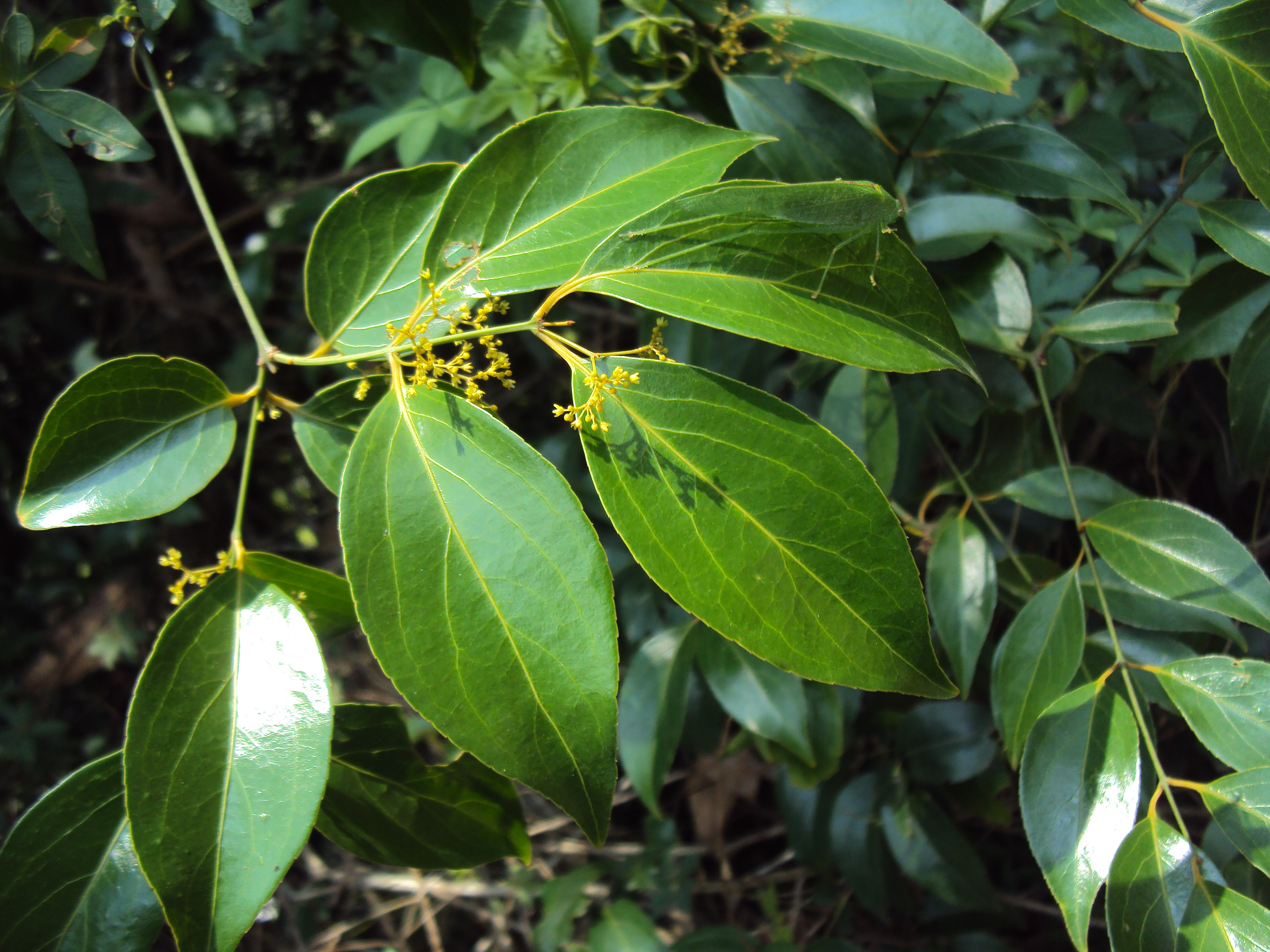
Reissantia indica (Willd.) N.Halle

Genus Reissantia:

- Reissantia indica (Willd.) N.Halle, indigenous
  - Reissantia indica (Willd.) N.Halle var. orientalis N.Halle & B.Mathew, indigenous

=== Robsonodendron ===
Genus Robsonodendron:

- Robsonodendron eucleiforme (Eckl. & Zeyh.) R.H.Archer, indigenous
- Robsonodendron maritimum (Bolus) R.H.Archer, endemic

=== Salacia ===
Genus Salacia:

- Salacia gerrardii Harv. ex Sprague, endemic
- Salacia kraussii (Harv.) Harv. indigenous
- Salacia leptoclada Tul. indigenous
- Salacia rehmannii Schinz, endemic
- Salacia transvaalensis Burtt Davy, accepted as Elaeodendron transvaalense (Burtt Davy) R.H.Archer
