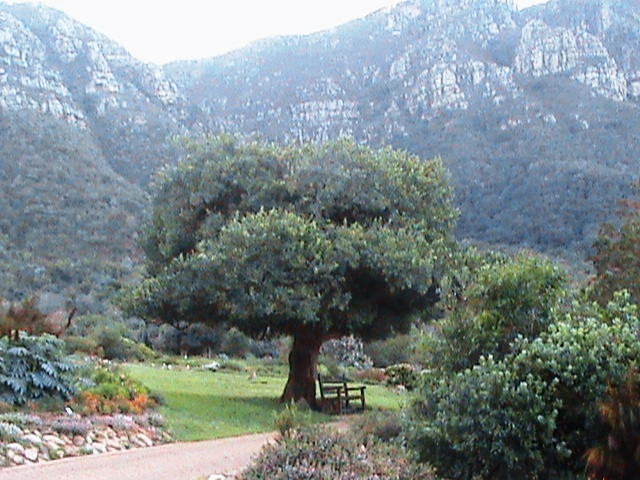

Scientific classification
- Kingdom: Plantae
- Clade: Tracheophytes
- Clade: Angiosperms
- Clade: Eudicots
- Clade: Rosids
- Order: Celastrales
- Family: Celastraceae
- Genus: Maytenus
- Species: M. oleoides

Binomial name
- Maytenus oleoides Loes.

= Maytenus oleoides =

Species of tree

Maytenus oleoides, commonly known as the mountain maytenus or rock false candlewood, is a dense, medium-sized tree that grows throughout the western half of South Africa. It is known as klipkershout in Afrikaans.

== Description ==
The bark of Maytenus oleoides is greyish-brown, smooth when young but becoming rugged and corky as it ages, with vertical grooves and transverse cracks. The leaves are alternate, oval, with a narrow base, stiff and leathery, mid-green with a bluish tinge. The margins are inrolled and smooth and the apex is rounded, or may be notched. The midribs are ridged, and when the leaves are snapped in half they differ from some other Maytenus species such as Maytenus acuminata in not having pale threads linking the halves. The young foliage is reddish. The flowers are small and grow in clusters in the axils of the leaves. The flowering period is normally from August to November but in Kirstenbosch National Botanical Garden, some specimens flower in May and June. The fruits are about 1 cm (0.4 in) in diameter and consist of a fleshy pale green, two-lobed capsule that dries and turns pale orange in the summer, before splitting open to reveal the seeds within a yellow aril.

== Distribution and habitat ==
Maytenus oleoides is native to South Africa where it occurs in the Eastern Cape, in part of the Northern Cape and in the Western Cape, including the Groot Winterhoek Mountains, Table Mountain and the Cape Peninsula. At high altitudes it grows as a shrub or dwarf tree but at lower elevations it forms a more robust, small tree up to 6 m (20 ft) high with a spreading crown. It mostly grows in woodland along streams and on scree slopes. The climate is one of cool moist winters and dry warm summers, with an average precipitation of 160 cm (63 in) which mostly falls between May and August.

== Fire ecology ==
The fynbos shrublands in South Africa are prone to wildfires, which happen about every twenty years. The intervening patches of evergreen forest which occupy about 10% of the land consist mostly of Maytenus oleoides, Cunonia capensis, Kiggelaria africana, Ilex mitis and Brabejum stellatifolium. Wildfires may burn the leaf litter but only spread to the crown canopy of forest trees if the fire is very intense. This may be because the tree foliage has a higher moisture content than that of the surrounding fynbos shrubs. The foliage may not burn but the trees may be scorched, however they have great regenerative ability and readily sprout from the blackened branches.

== Pictures ==
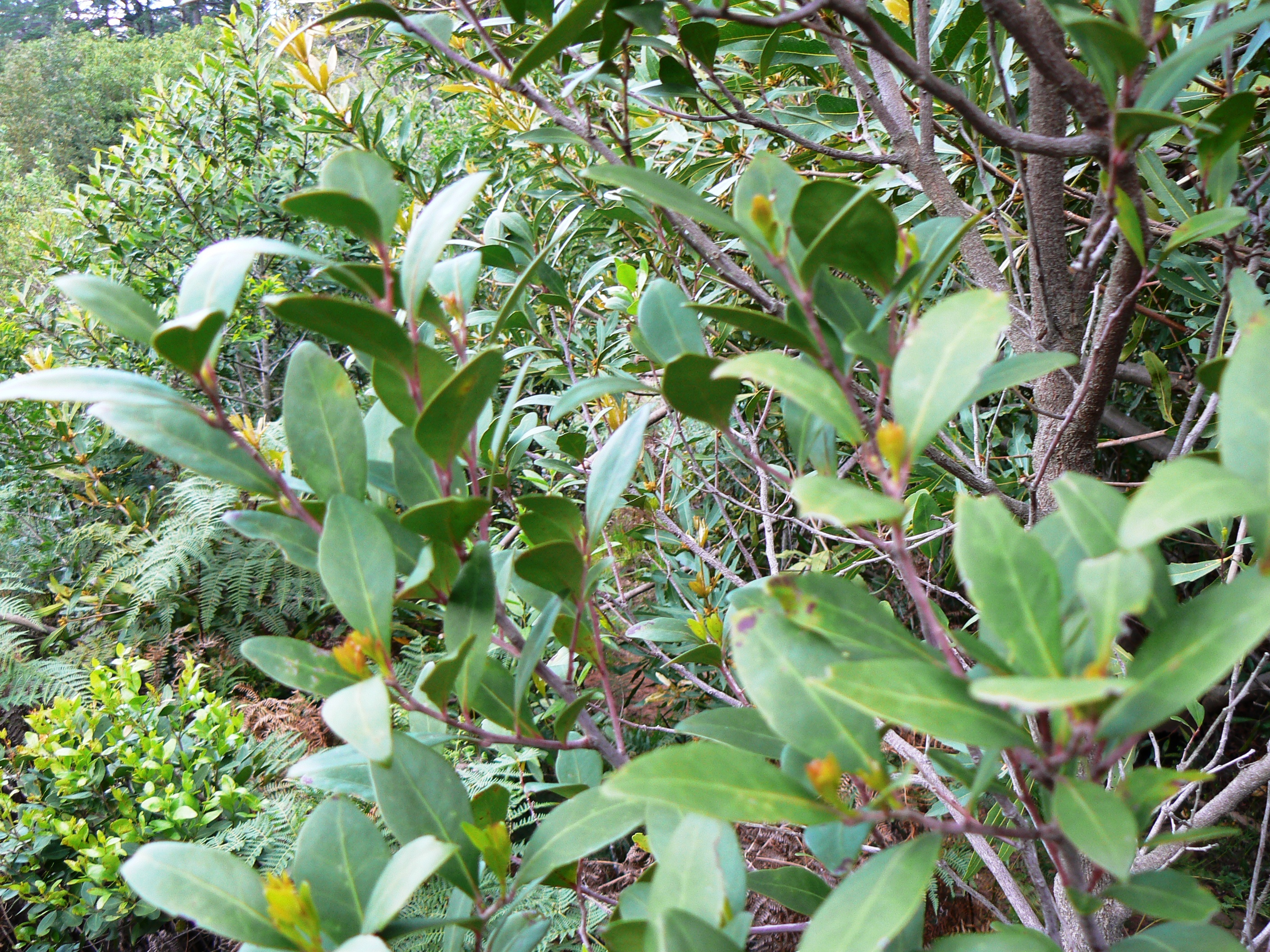
Detail of foliage

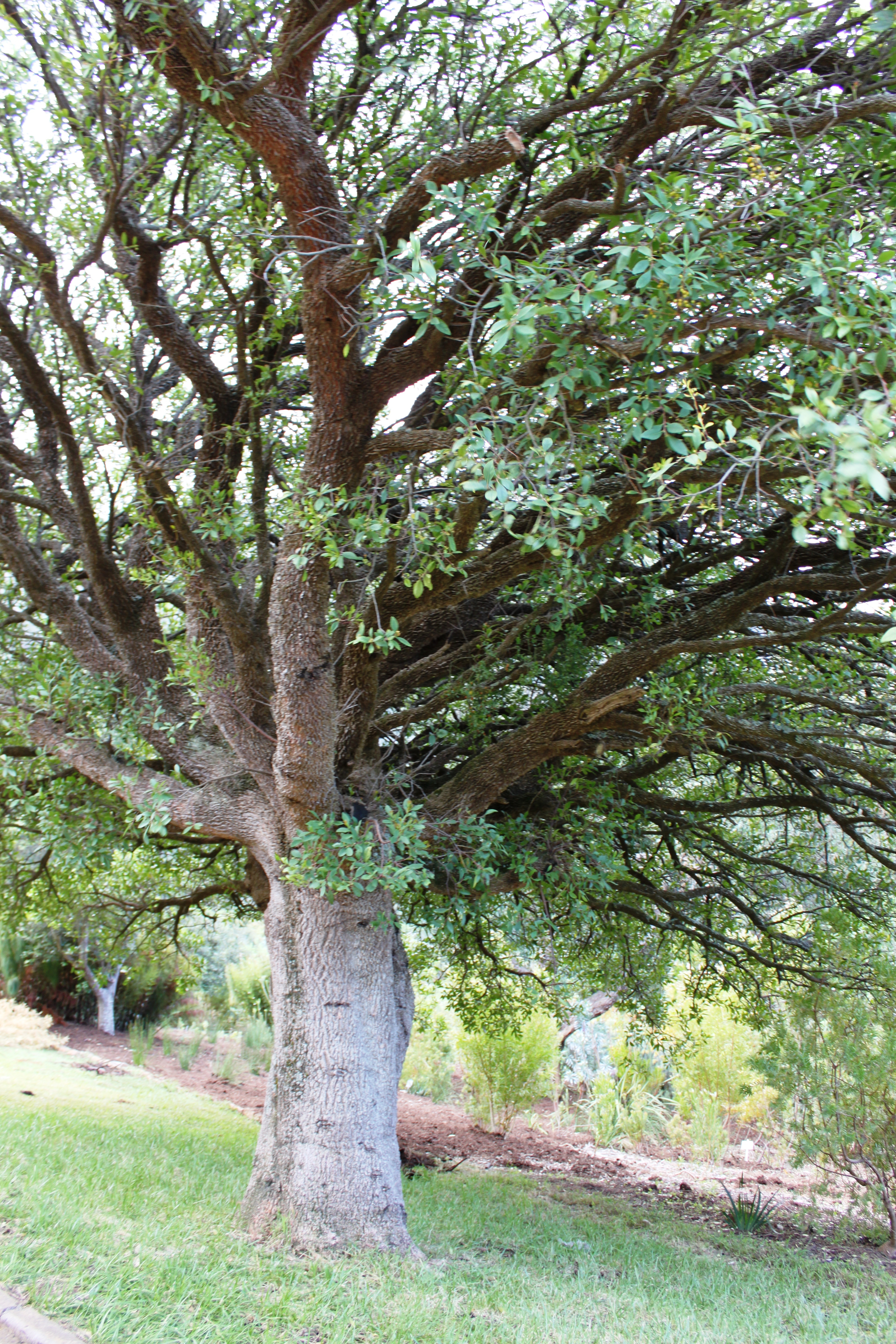
Trunk and branches

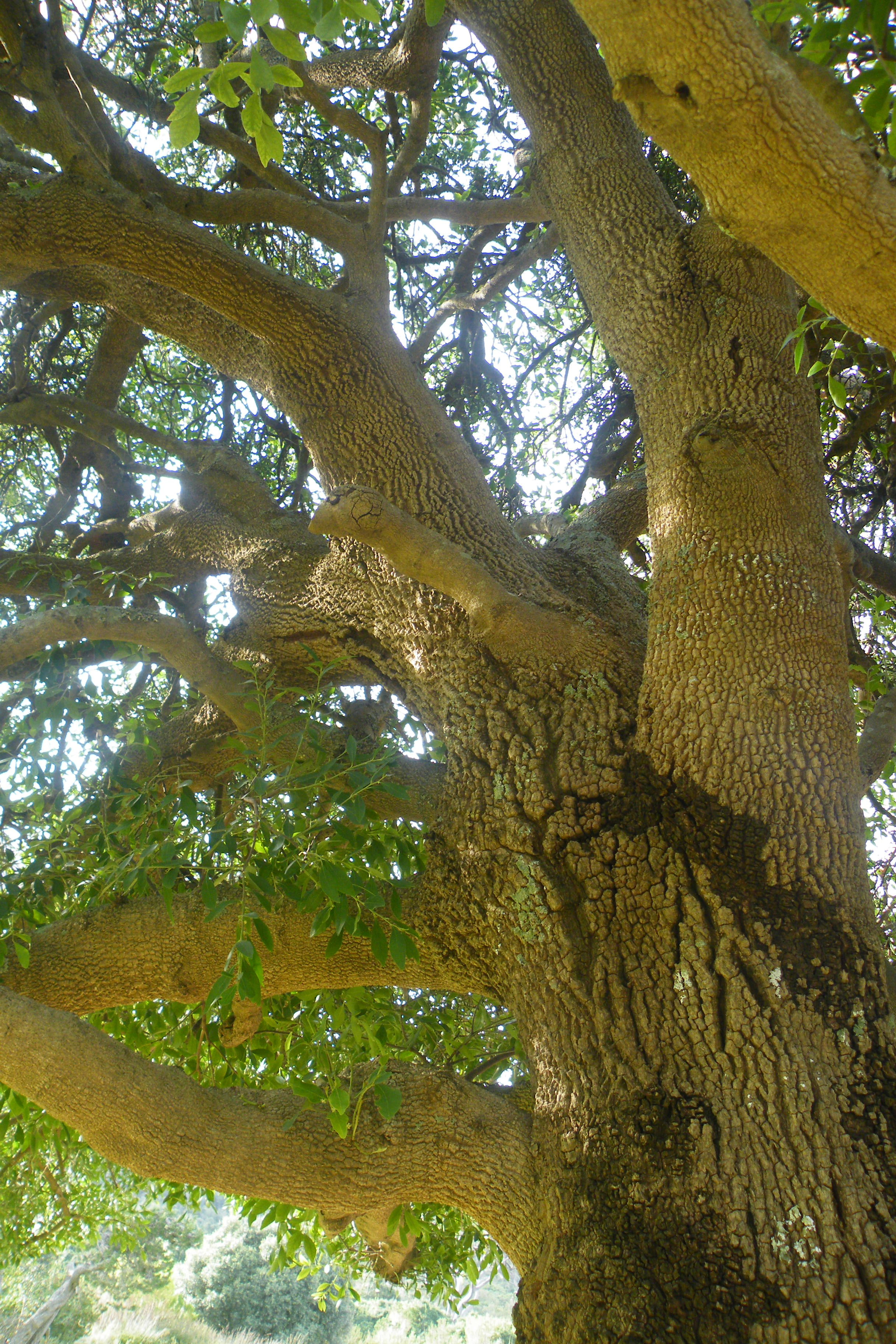
The mountain maytenus has soft corky bark.
