= Maytenus oleosa =

Conservation status
- Vulnerable (IUCN 2.3)

Scientific classification
- Kingdom: Plantae
- Clade: Tracheophytes
- Clade: Angiosperms
- Clade: Eudicots
- Clade: Rosids
- Order: Celastrales
- Family: Celastraceae
- Genus: Maytenus
- Species: M. oleosa

Binomial name
- Maytenus oleosa A.E.van Wyk & R.H.Archer

Species of tree

Maytenus oleosa is a rare, willow-like, small tree in the family Celastraceae which is limited in habitat to lowland forests along the KwaZulu-Natal and Eastern Cape coasts of South Africa, particularly where there are streams or rivers. It is commonly associated with Gymnosporia bachmannii. The species is threatened by habitat loss and agricultural activities.

Efforts to conserve the tree are in place; it is a protected species in the Umtamvuna Nature Reserve and Mkambati Nature Reserve, and several forest areas have been demarcated in the Transkei.
