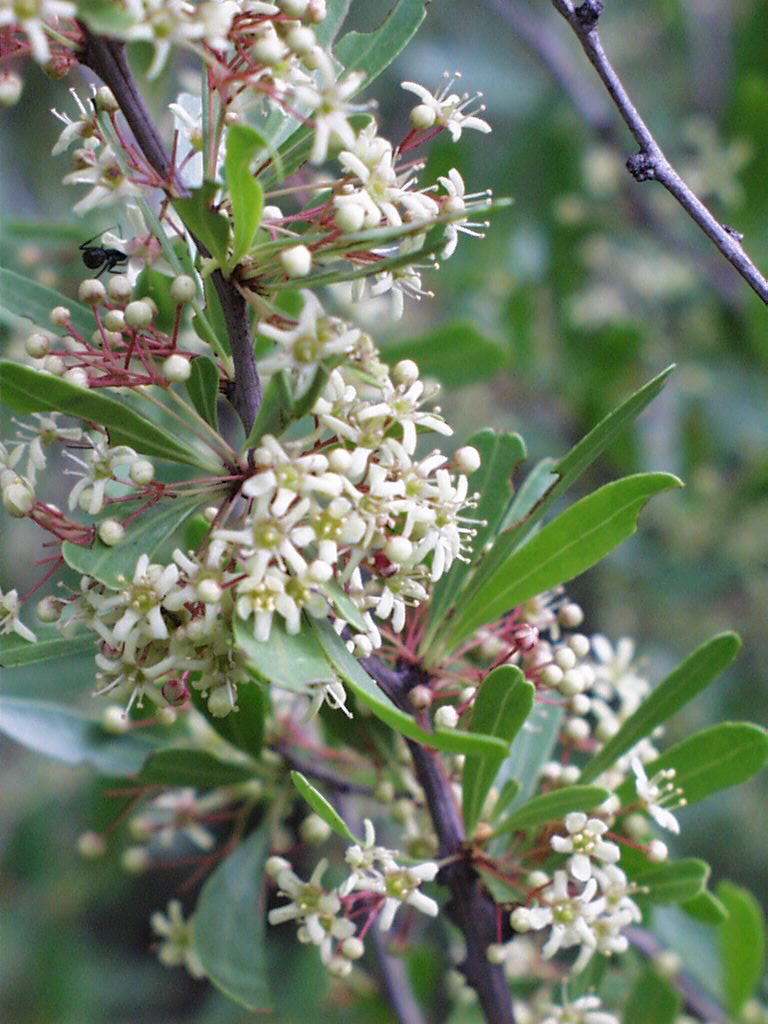
- Gymnosporia tenuispina in flower

Scientific classification
- Kingdom: Plantae
- Clade: Tracheophytes
- Clade: Angiosperms
- Clade: Eudicots
- Clade: Rosids
- Order: Celastrales
- Family: Celastraceae
- Genus: Gymnosporia
- Species: G. tenuispina

Binomial name
- Gymnosporia tenuispina (Sond.) Szyszyl. (1888)

Synonyms
- Celastrus tenuispinus Sond. (1860); Gymnosporia botsabelensis Loes. (1896); Maytenus tenuispina (Sond.) Marais (1960)

= Gymnosporia tenuispina =

Bell spike-thorn

Species of flowering plant

Gymnosporia tenuispina is a Southern African shrub or small tree of about 2 metres in height belonging to the family Celastraceae.

Native to eastern South Africa, eastern Botswana, and Zimbabwe, it is common on rocky outcrops, dip slopes and bushveld, and armed with slender spines of about 25mm long. Leaves are alternate or densely clustered in tufts, elliptic to almost linear, margins irregularly and finely serrate, apex frequently notched.

Edwin Percy Phillips, the South African taxonomist, describes the genus Gymnosporia in his 1926 "Genera of South African Plants" as Sepals 5, sometimes unequal, acute, obtuse, sometimes acuminate, with entire, deeply laciniated or fimbriated margins. Petals oblong to sub-orbicular, with the margins entire ciliated or undulate. Disc deeply 5-lobed, sometimes 5-sided, collar-like or saucer-shaped, with crenate or undulate margins. Ovary 2-4-chambered, with 2 ovules in each chamber; style usually short; stigma 2-4-lobed. Fruit a capsule. Seeds often with an aril.

== Gallery ==
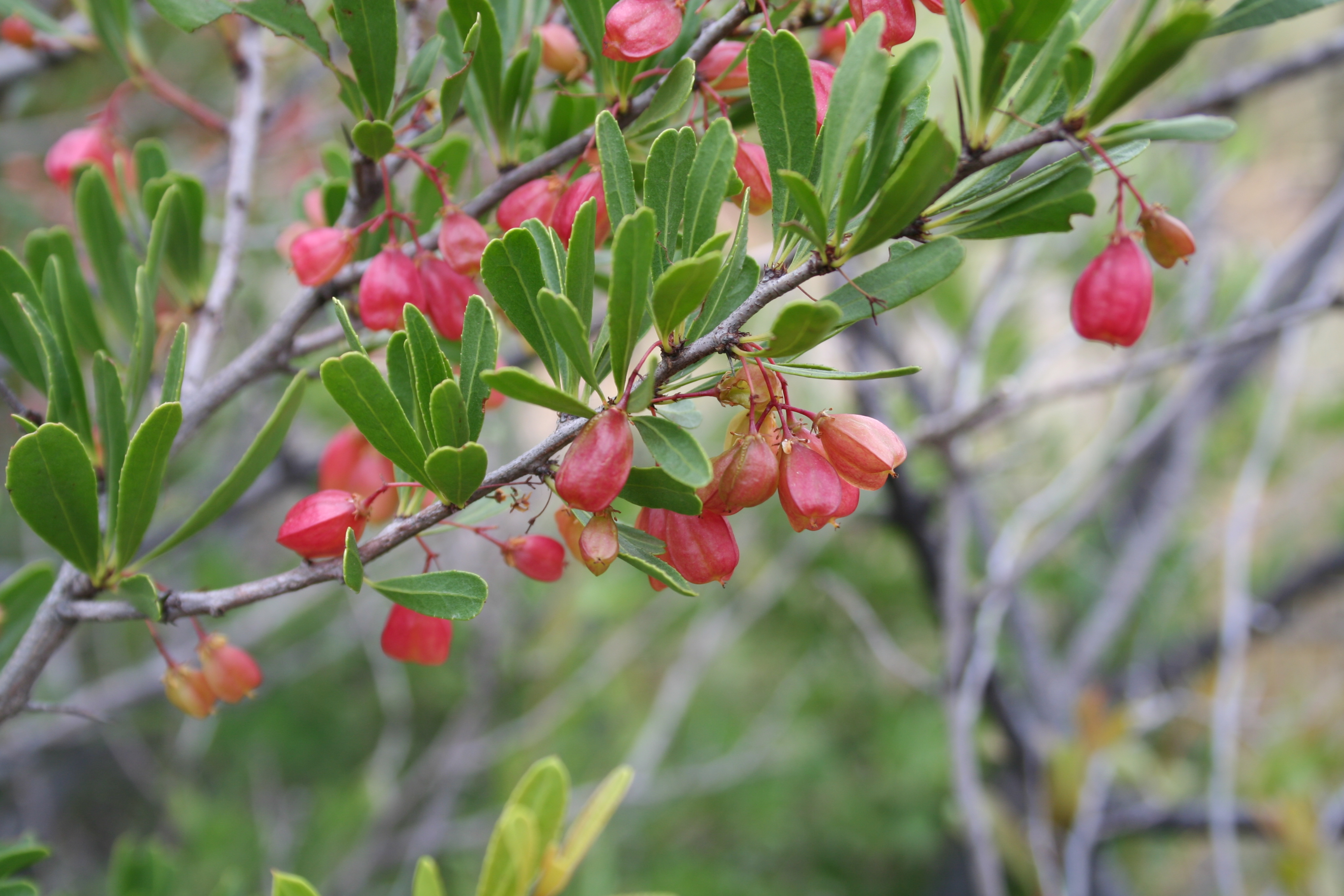

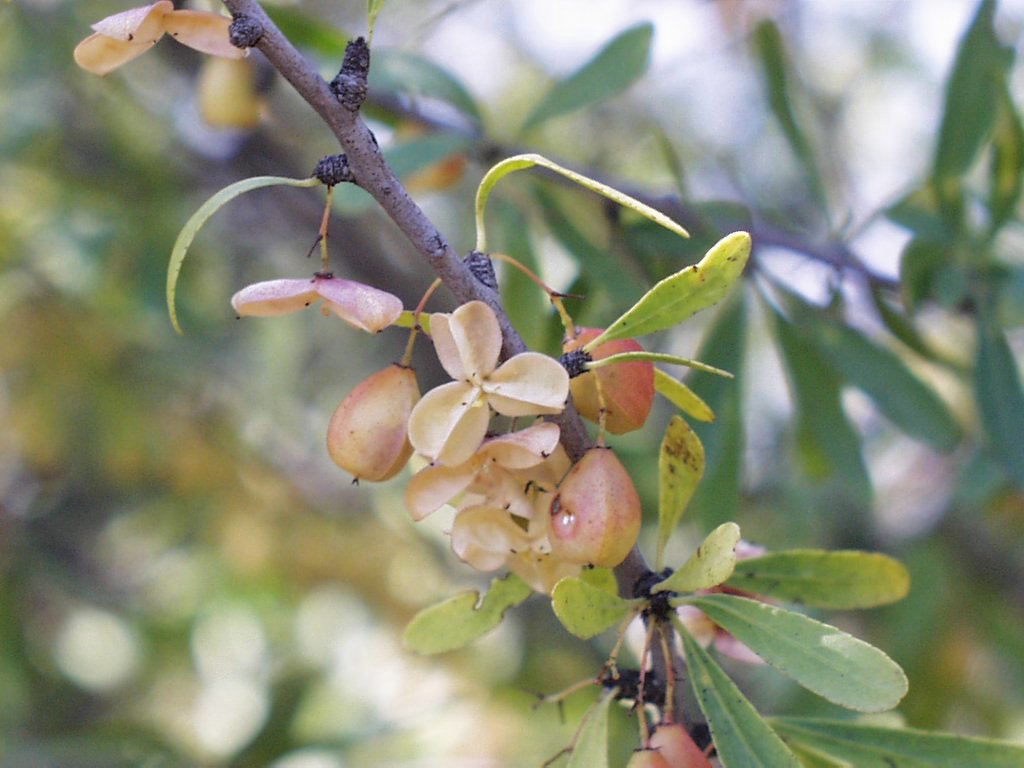
