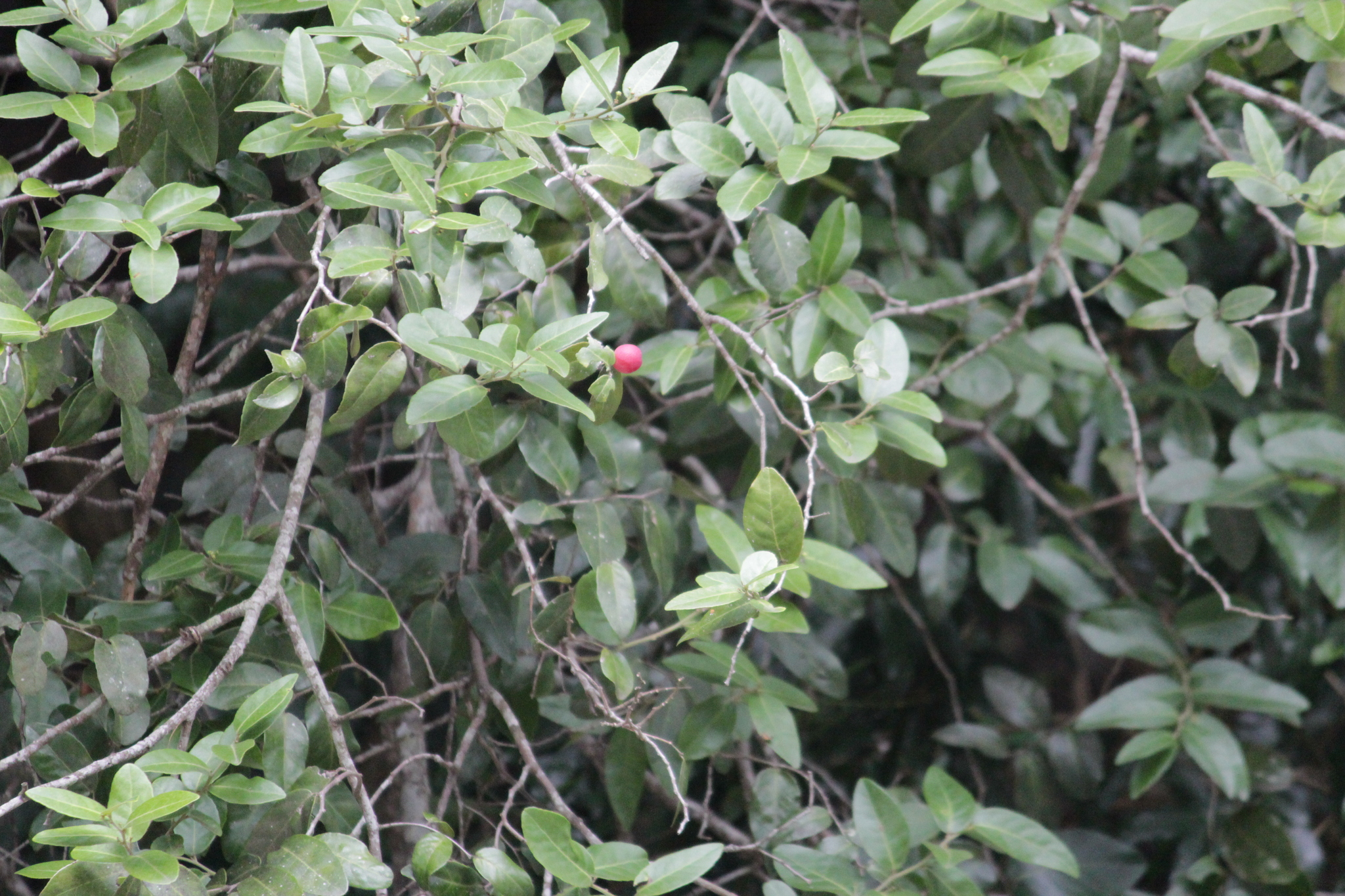

Scientific classification
- Kingdom: Plantae
- Clade: Tracheophytes
- Clade: Angiosperms
- Clade: Eudicots
- Clade: Rosids
- Order: Celastrales
- Family: Celastraceae
- Genus: Allocassine; N.Robson
- Species: A. laurifolia

Binomial name
- Allocassine laurifolia (Harv.) N.Robson

Synonyms
- Cassine laurifolia (Harv.) Davison; Elaeodendron laurifolium Harv.

= Allocassine =

Genus of flowering plants

Allocassine laurifolia is a species of flowering plant belonging to the family Celastraceae. It is a climbing or scrambling shrub native to southeastern Africa, ranging from eastern Zimbabwe to Mozambique, Eswatini, KwaZulu-Natal, and the Cape Provinces. It is the sole species in genus Allocassine.
