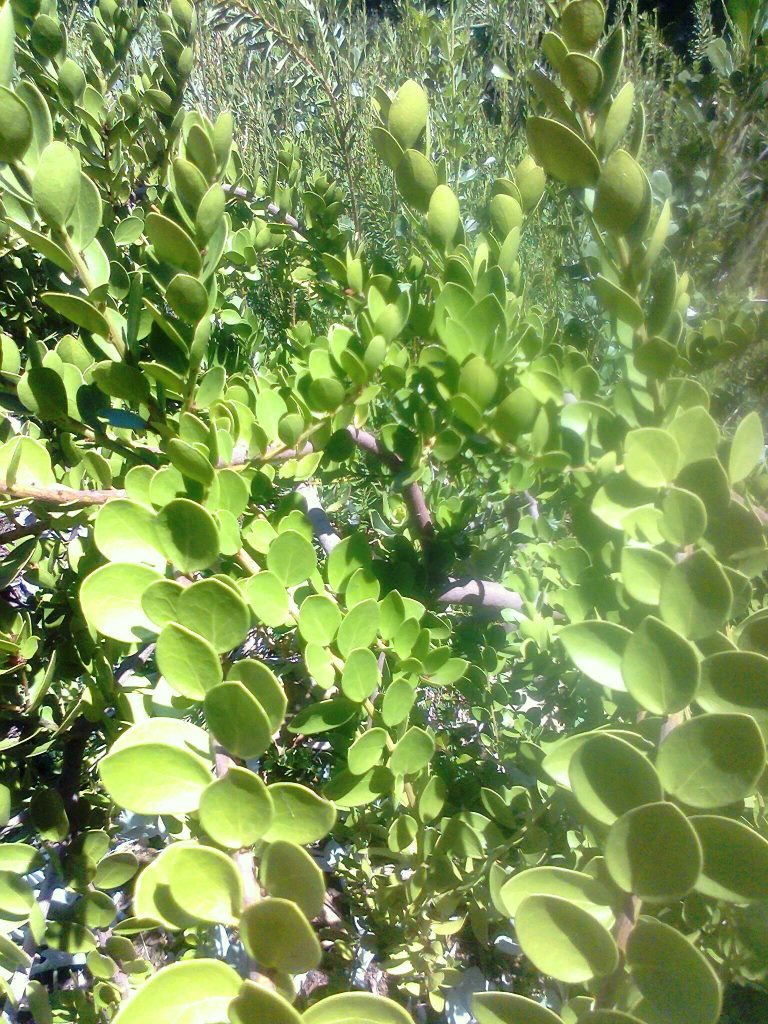
- Robsonodendron maritimum

Scientific classification
- Kingdom: Plantae
- Clade: Tracheophytes
- Clade: Angiosperms
- Clade: Eudicots
- Clade: Rosids
- Order: Celastrales
- Family: Celastraceae
- Genus: Robsonodendron; R.H.Archer

Species
- See text

= Robsonodendron =

Genus of flowering plants

Robsonodendron is a genus of flowering plants in the family Celastraceae. It contains two species native to Eswatini and South Africa.

== Species ==
Two species are accepted.

- Ronsonodendron eucleiforme (Eckl. & Zeyh.) R.H.Archer
- Robsonodendron maritimum (Bolus) R.H.Archer
