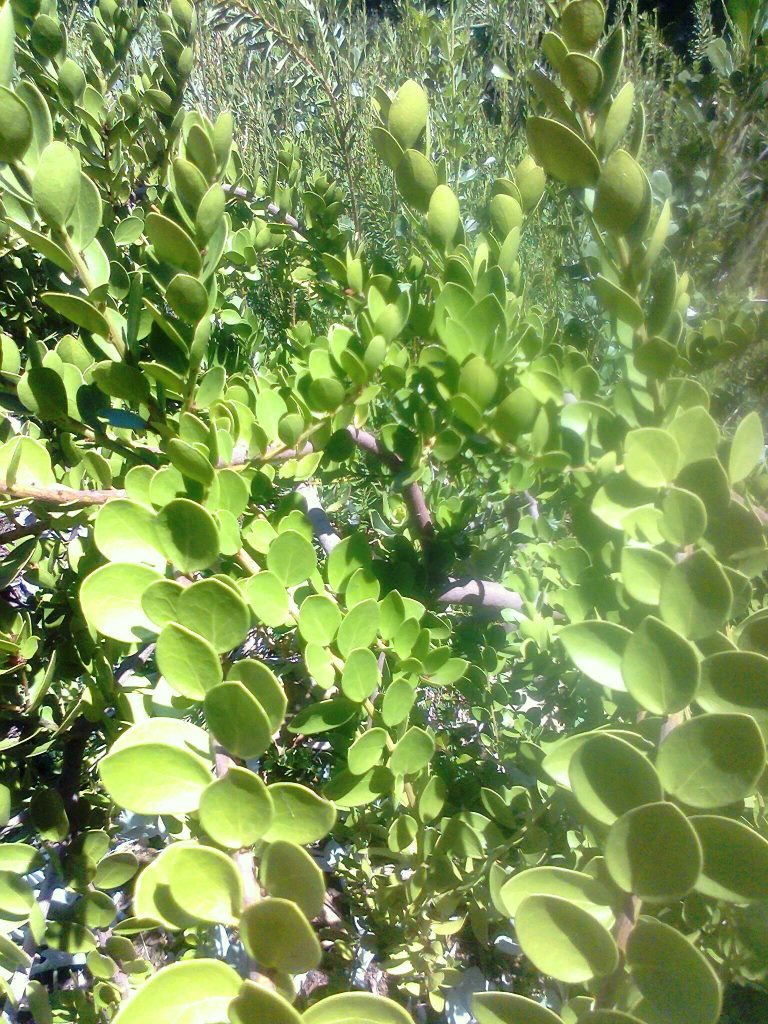

Scientific classification
- Kingdom: Plantae
- Clade: Tracheophytes
- Clade: Angiosperms
- Clade: Eudicots
- Clade: Rosids
- Order: Celastrales
- Family: Celastraceae
- Genus: Robsonodendron
- Species: R. maritimum

Binomial name
- Robsonodendron maritimum (Bolus) R.H.Archer

Synonyms
- Cassine maritima

= Robsonodendron maritimum =

Species of tree

Robsonodendron maritimum (also known as white silky bark or witsybas) is a small, shrubby, evergreen tree that is indigenous to the coastal regions of South Africa.

Its natural range extends from Cape Town, along the coast as far as the Eastern Cape. In very windy areas it tends to be shaped (and effectively pruned) by the wind. Its flowers are bisexual.
