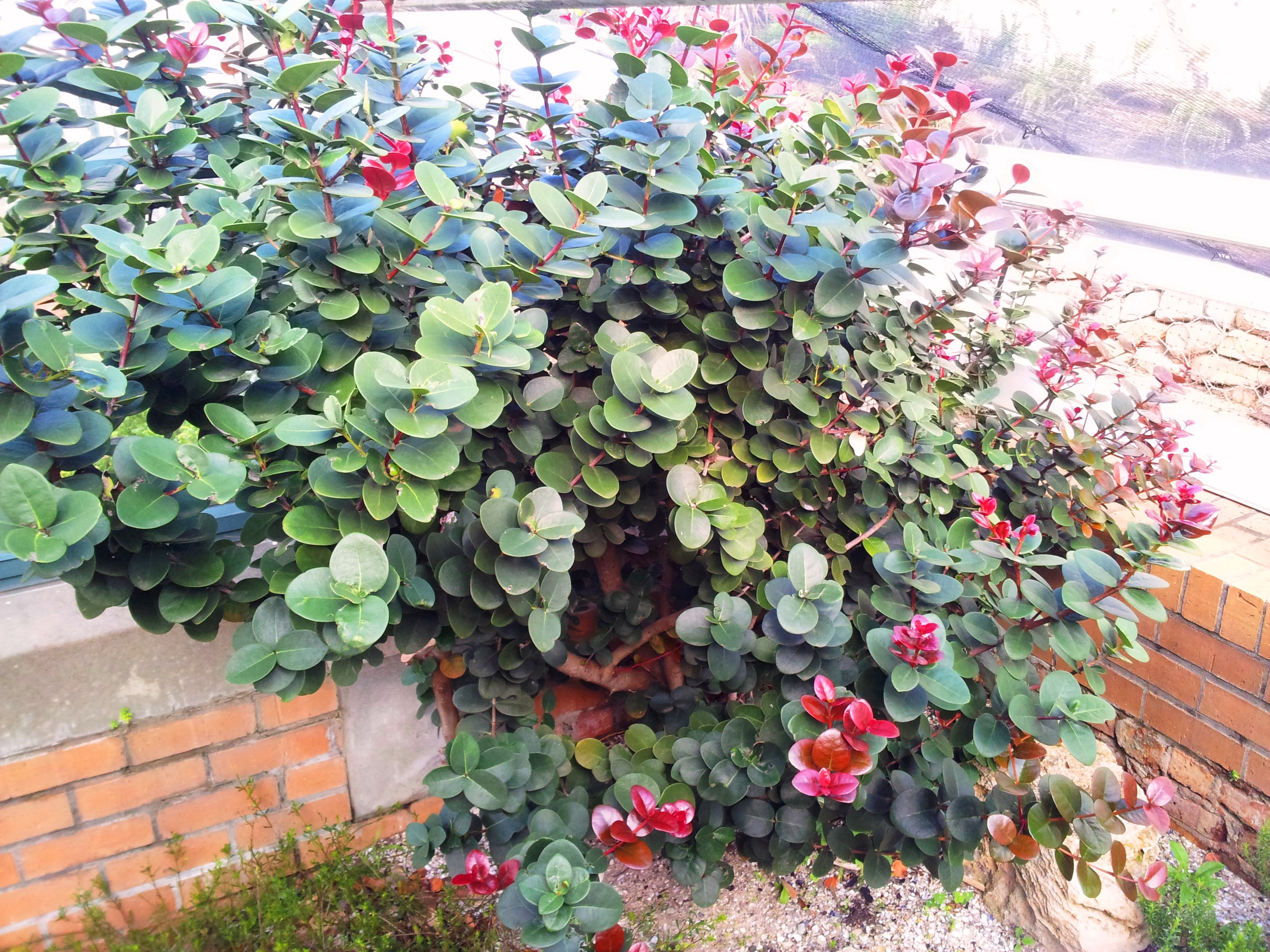
- Young specimen in cultivation

Scientific classification
- Kingdom: Plantae
- Clade: Tracheophytes
- Clade: Angiosperms
- Clade: Eudicots
- Clade: Rosids
- Order: Celastrales
- Family: Celastraceae
- Genus: Maurocenia; Mill.
- Species: M. frangula

Binomial name
- Maurocenia frangula (L.) Mill.

Synonyms
- Cassine maurocenia L.; Maurocenia frangula Sond.; Maurocenia capensis Sond.

= Maurocenia =

Genus of trees

Maurocenia frangula (commonly known as Khoi cherry or vulture-berry) is a small, rounded tree of about 4 metres, that is endemic to the Western Cape, South Africa.

== Description ==
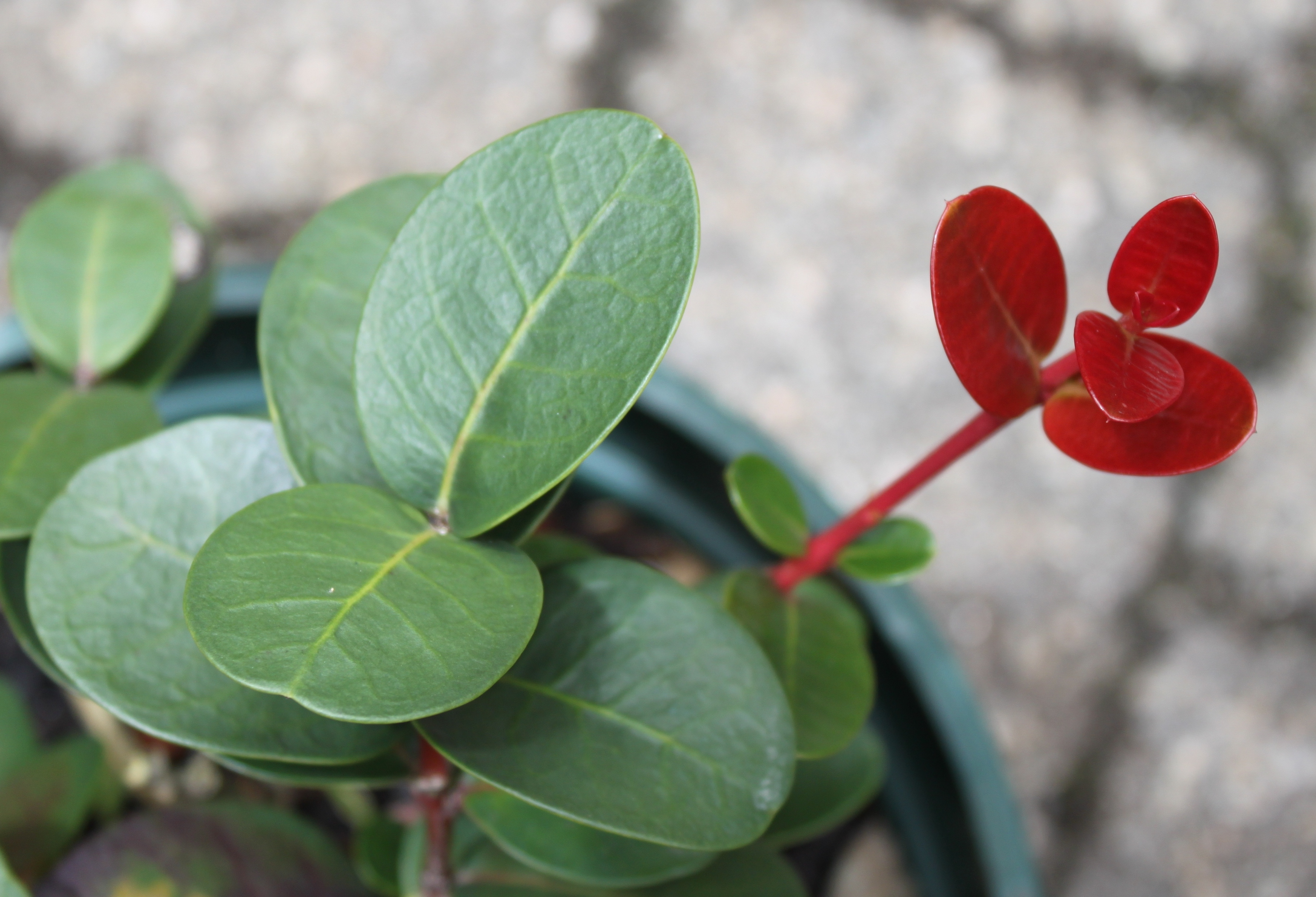
The distinctively bright scarlet new growth.

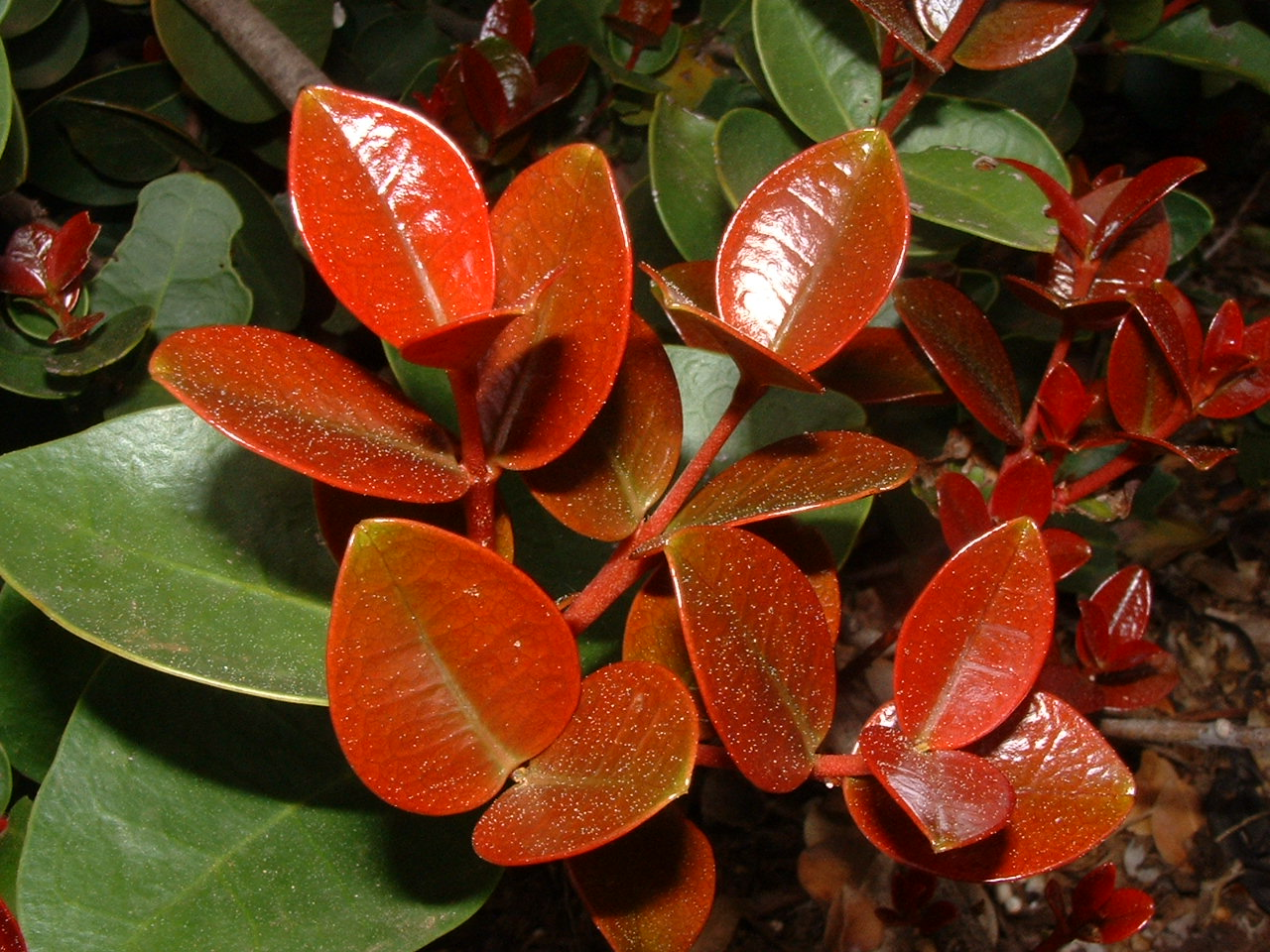
Detail of new growth.

It has small, fragrant, male and female flowers usually on separate trees, cherry-sized edible purple berries and hard yellow wood that is used to make musical instruments.

New growth is bright scarlet. Mature leaves are a very dark green and leathery in texture. The leaves are distinctively round. They grow in opposite pairs up the stem with a noticeable symmetry, each new pair perpendicular to the previous.

== Distribution ==
It naturally occurs only on the Cape Peninsula and in the neighbouring territory of the far south-west corner of the Western Cape. It has been recorded as far north as the vicinity of Saldanha.

Here it is normally found in fynbos, coastal bush or in mountain ravines. Due to the fynbos vegetation being subject to seasonal fires, this species is a resprouter. Nevertheless, it tends to be more common on rocky outcrops and ravines which offer some protection from the fires.

== Cultivation ==
In cultivation it is used as an ornamental tree, or for hedging. It is slow growing, but is extremely long-lived. It flourishes in well-drained sandy soils and a winter-rainfall climate. It tolerates full sun and semi-shade, and is also drought tolerant once established.

As an ornamental, it is valued for its bright scarlet new growth, the shape and symmetry of its mature foliage, its purple edible berries, and its tiny fragrant flowers which attract bees.
