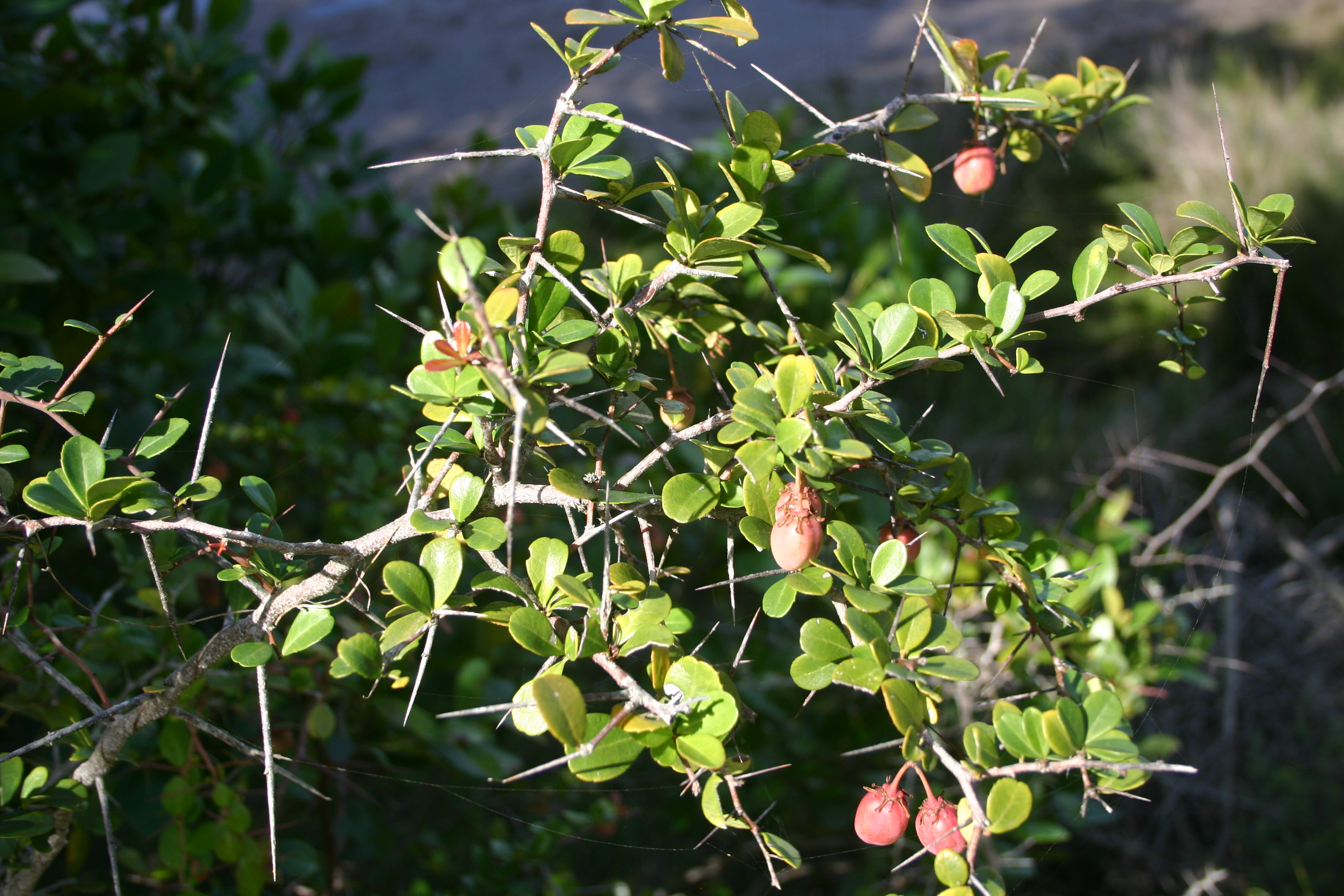

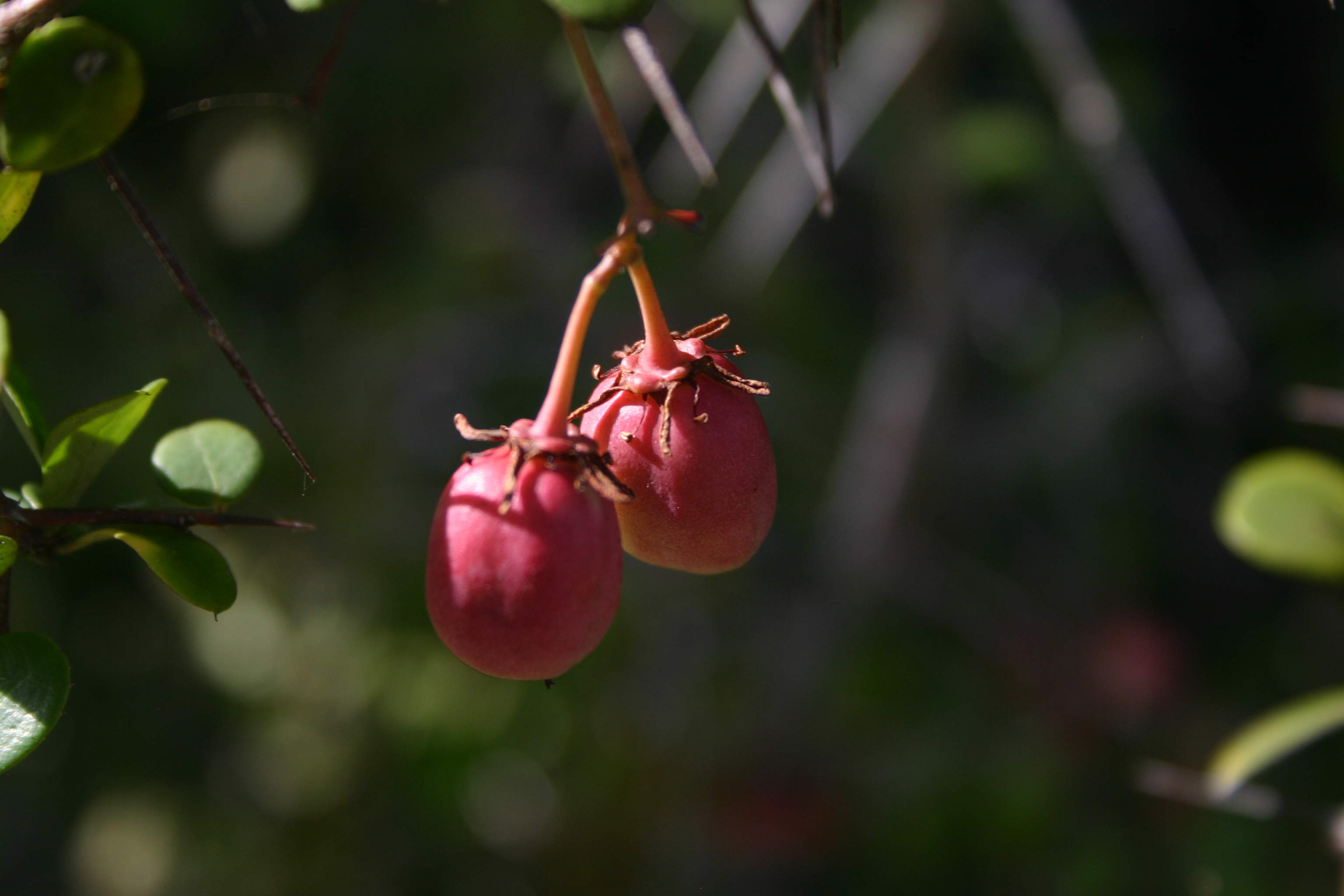

Scientific classification
- Kingdom: Plantae
- Clade: Tracheophytes
- Clade: Angiosperms
- Clade: Eudicots
- Clade: Rosids
- Order: Celastrales
- Family: Celastraceae
- Genus: Gymnosporia
- Species: G. nemorosa

Binomial name
- Gymnosporia nemorosa (Eckl. & Zeyh.) Szyszyl.

Synonyms
- Celastrus nemorosus Eckl. & Zeyh.; Maytenus nemorosa (Eckl. & Zeyh.) Marais

= Gymnosporia nemorosa =

Species of flowering plant

Gymnosporia nemorosa is a spiny, somewhat sprawling evergreen shrub or small tree with drooping branches growing to some 5 m tall and found along forest edges in Mpumalanga, Eswatini, KwaZulu-Natal south to the Garden Route in the Southern Cape. In Maputaland the species adopts the form of a geoxylic suffrutex or 'underground' tree, with shoots sprouting from its woody, underground axis.

Its fragrant white, unisexual flower clusters grow in the axils of leaves on lateral shoots resembling spines. Dusky-pink, pear-shaped, pendulous fruits are about 15 mm in length and the same in diameter, dehiscing along three longitudinal lines to produce 3 valves curling back from the distal end to reveal orange arils enclosing the seeds. Leaves are alternate or tufted, hairless, leathery, 25–50 mm long, with slightly serrate margins, ovate to round in shape, glossy and dark green above, paler beneath, emarginate to acute, depressed apex. Branchlets are spiny and densely spotted with pale lenticels. Larvae of the African moth Drepanogynis cambogiaria (Guenée, 1858) feed on this species and on other members of the Celastraceae. This is one of the species frequently browsed by Black Rhino in the Hluhluwe–iMfolozi Park.

Celastrus nemorosus – Glabrous, spiny; spines strong; leaves tufted, solitary on the twigs, elliptical, rounded, obtuse, or shortly emarginate, margined, dentato-serrate, shortly cuneate at base, sub-coriaceous, veiny; panicles axillary, cymose, shorter than the leaf, or equalling it; capsules trigonous, 3–2-seeded. Very like the preceding, but differing in the broader and rounder leaves, not much attenuate at base, evidently serrate or toothed. Also allied to C. verrucosus which is distinguished by its foliage, warty branches, and different fruit. Branches terete, sometimes sub-verrucose; twigs somewhat angular. Leaves glaucous above, livid below, with raised nerves, the larger 2–2 1/2 inches long, 1–1 1/2 inch wide; the smaller uncial. Panicle many flowered, in β. looser and longer. Flowers of C. buxifolius. Capsule 3 lines long. Collected at Kragga kamma, Adow, Olifantshoek, Hassagaisbosch, Howiesons Poort and Port Natal.

— Flora Capensis, Harvey & Sonder, Vol 1, page 460 (1894)

== Phytochemicals ==
Galactitol, β-amyrin, lupeol derivatives, friedelin derivatives, tingenone, 20-hydroxy-20-epi-tingenone

== Etymology ==
Nemus -oris = grove. cf. 'nemoral nemoral' = 'pertaining to a wood or grove' and Nemoralia.

== Gallery ==
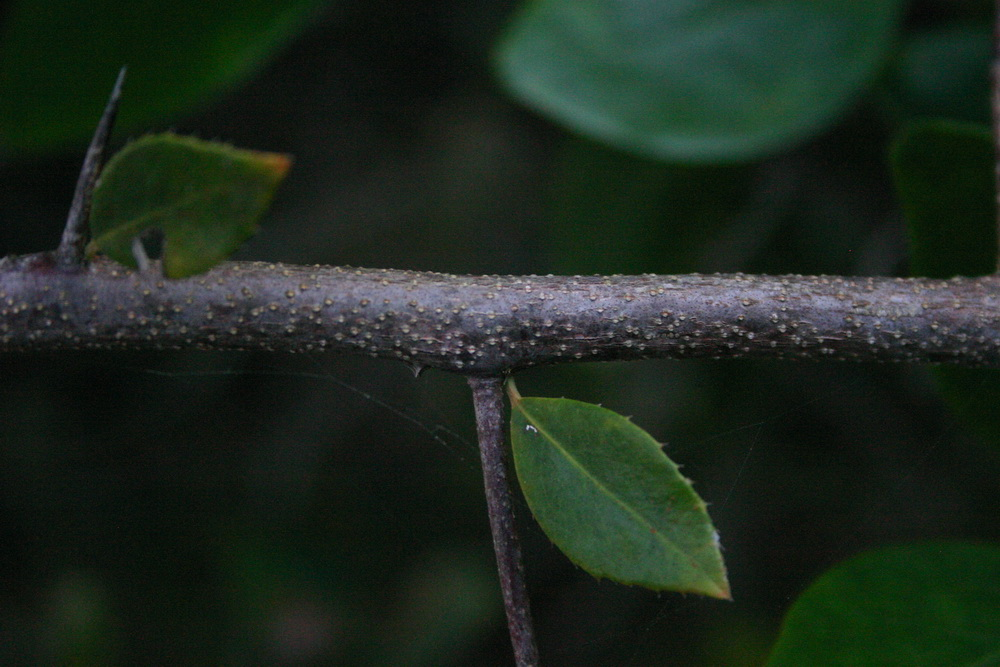
Lenticels

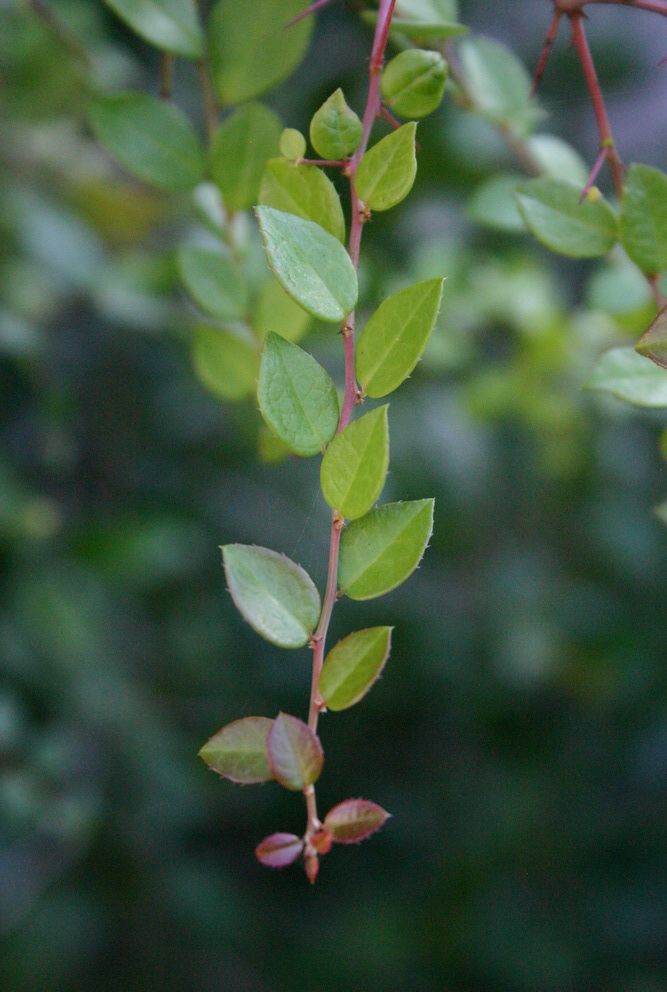
New shoot

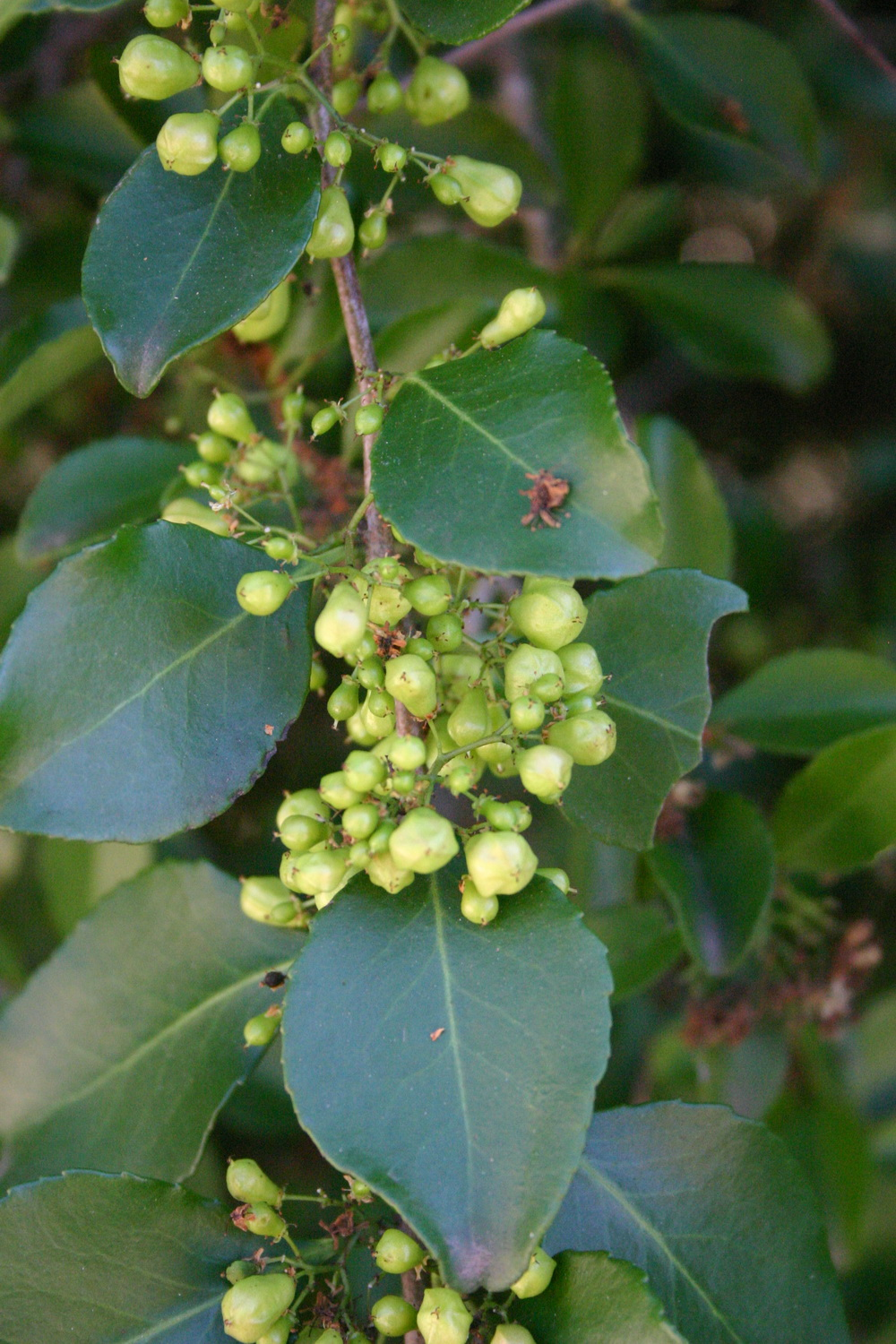
Immature fruits

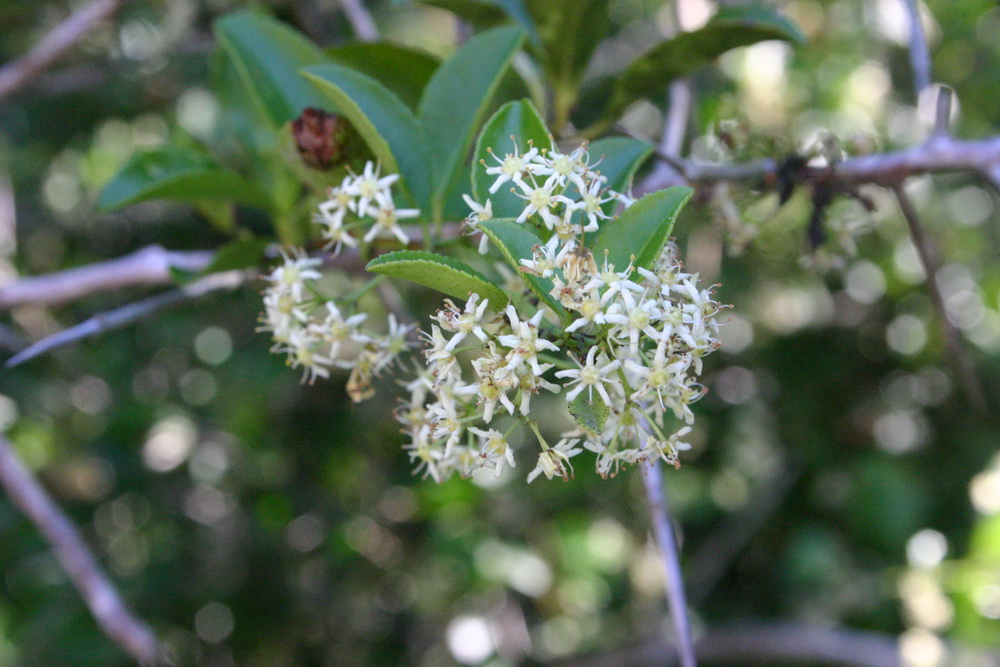
Flowers

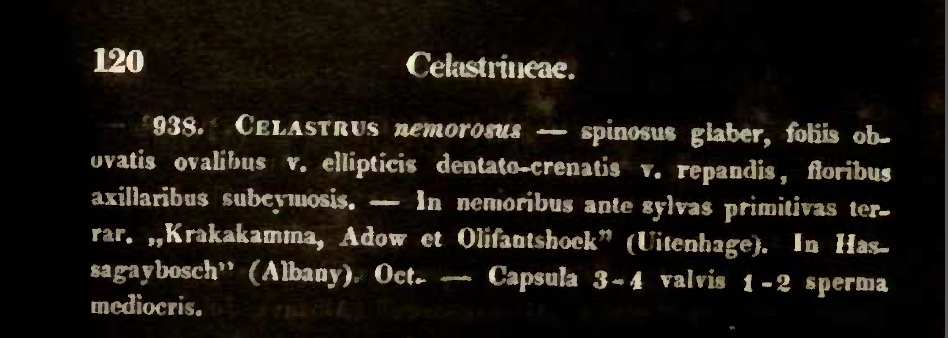
First description from "Enumeratio Plantarum Africae Australis Extratropicae" - Ecklon & Zeyher (1835)
