= Pseudosalacia =

Conservation status
- Vulnerable (IUCN 2.3)

Scientific classification
- Kingdom: Plantae
- Clade: Tracheophytes
- Clade: Angiosperms
- Clade: Eudicots
- Clade: Rosids
- Order: Celastrales
- Family: Celastraceae
- Genus: Pseudosalacia; Codd
- Species: P. streyi

Binomial name
- Pseudosalacia streyi Codd

Genus of flowering plants

Pseudosalacia streyi is a species of plant in the family Celastraceae, and is the only species in the genus Pseudosalacia. It is a shrub or tree native to the Eastern Cape and KwaZulu-Natal provinces of South Africa. It is threatened by habitat loss.
