= Elaeodendron transvaalense =

Scientific classification
- Kingdom: Plantae
- Clade: Tracheophytes
- Clade: Angiosperms
- Clade: Eudicots
- Clade: Rosids
- Order: Celastrales
- Family: Celastraceae
- Genus: Elaeodendron
- Species: E. transvaalense

Binomial name
- Elaeodendron transvaalense (Burtt Davy) R.H.Archer

Synonyms
- Cassine transvaalensis (Burtt Davy) Codd; Crocoxylon transvaalense (Burtt Davy) N.Robson; Pseudocassine transvaalensis (Burtt Davy) Bredell; Salacia transvaalensis Burtt Davy; Elaeodendron croceum var. heterophyllum Loes.; Elaeodendron croceum var. triandrum Dinter

Species of tree

Elaeodendron transvaalense (Burtt Davy) R.H.Archer (bushveld saffron, Afrikaans: Bosveld-saffraan, Lepelhout, or Oupitjie, Tsonga: Monomane, Venda: Mulumanamana, Zulu: Ingwavuma) is a species of flowering plant in the family Celastraceae. It is a protected tree in South Africa. It also occurs in other Southern African countries like Angola, Namibia, Botswana, Zambia, Zimbabwe, Eswatini and Mozambique.
