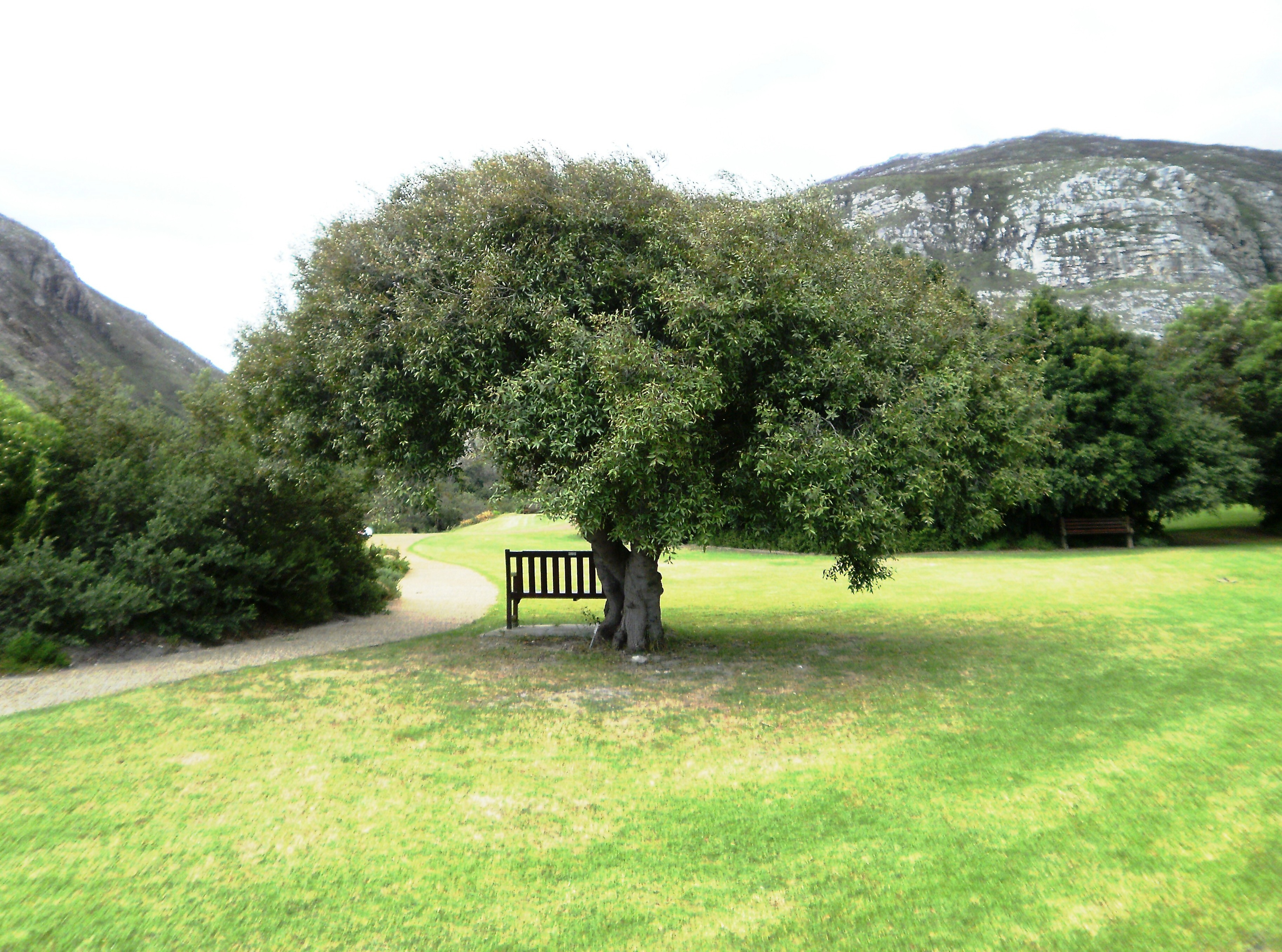

Conservation status
- Least Concern (IUCN 3.1)

Scientific classification
- Kingdom: Plantae
- Clade: Tracheophytes
- Clade: Angiosperms
- Clade: Eudicots
- Clade: Rosids
- Order: Celastrales
- Family: Celastraceae
- Genus: Maytenus
- Species: M. acuminata

Binomial name
- Maytenus acuminata (L.f.) Loes.

= Maytenus acuminata =

Species of tree

Maytenus acuminata (also called the silky bark, umNama or Sybas) is a variable, medium-sized, evergreen tree indigenous to Africa, including South Africa. Here it is especially common on the verges of afro-montane forest. It produces small, white flowers and bright orange or red berries. In cultivation it is useful as a light shade tree, as an ornamental, or for attracting birds. The reference to "silk" in some of its common names derives from the way in which some of its sap will congeal into silky threads on contact with air. This can most easily be demonstrated by carefully breaking a leaf across, then gently pulling the two halves apart (see illustration). The threads appear at points that coincide with the positions where major veins in the leaf have broken. The threads do not appear to have any practical use, least of all as fibre.

== Gallery ==
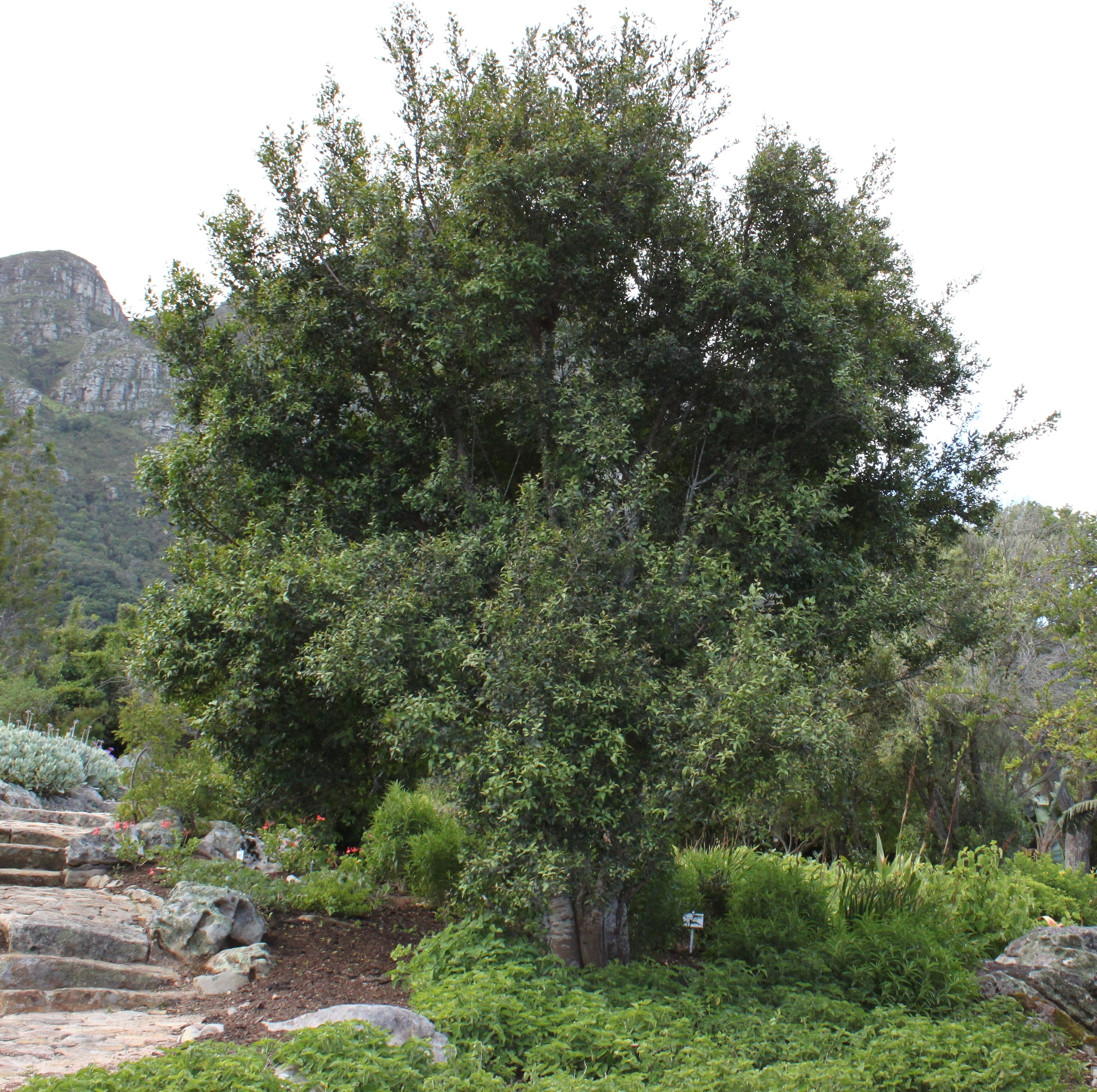
In cultivation.

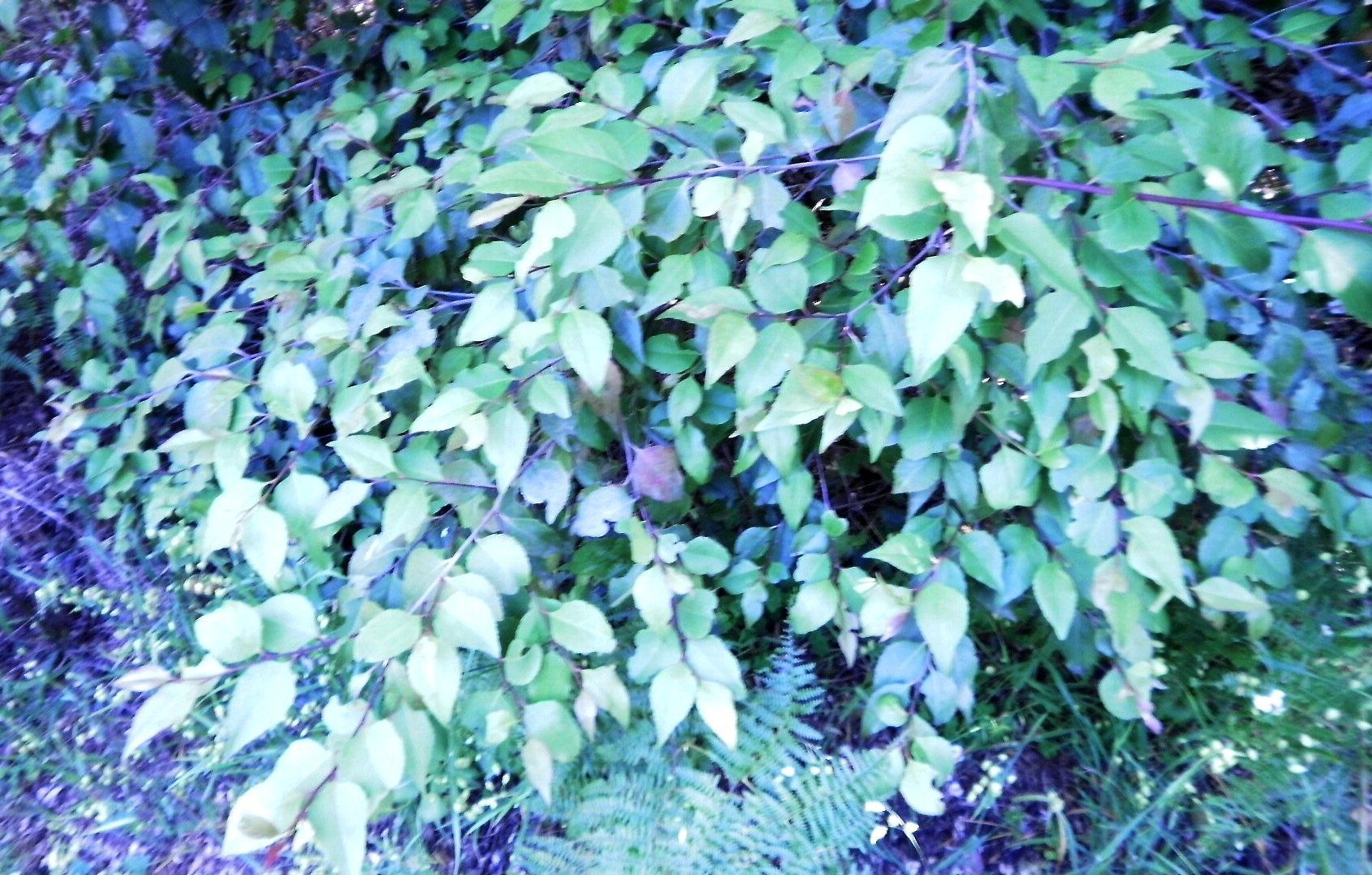
Foliage detail

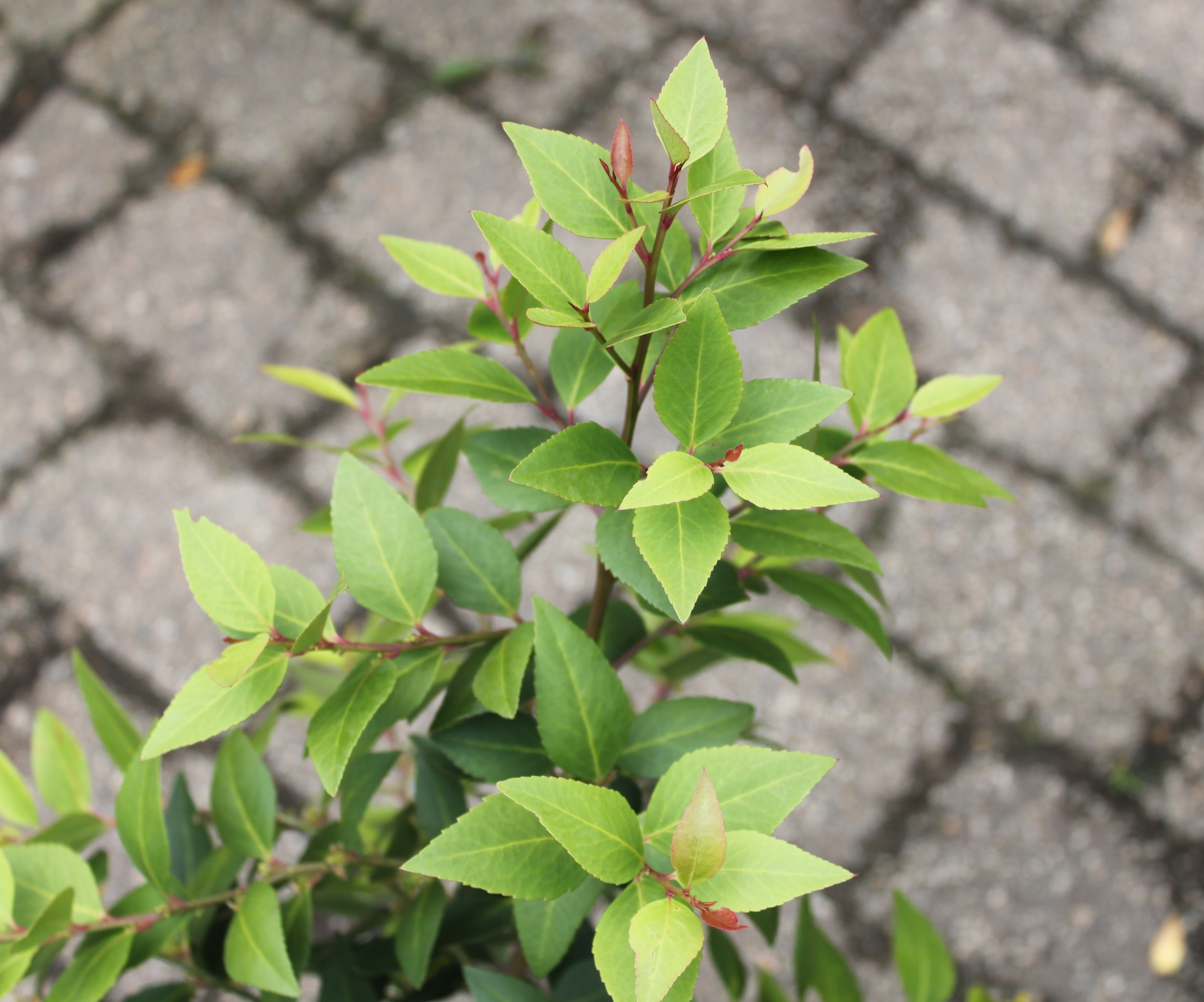
Foliage detail 2.

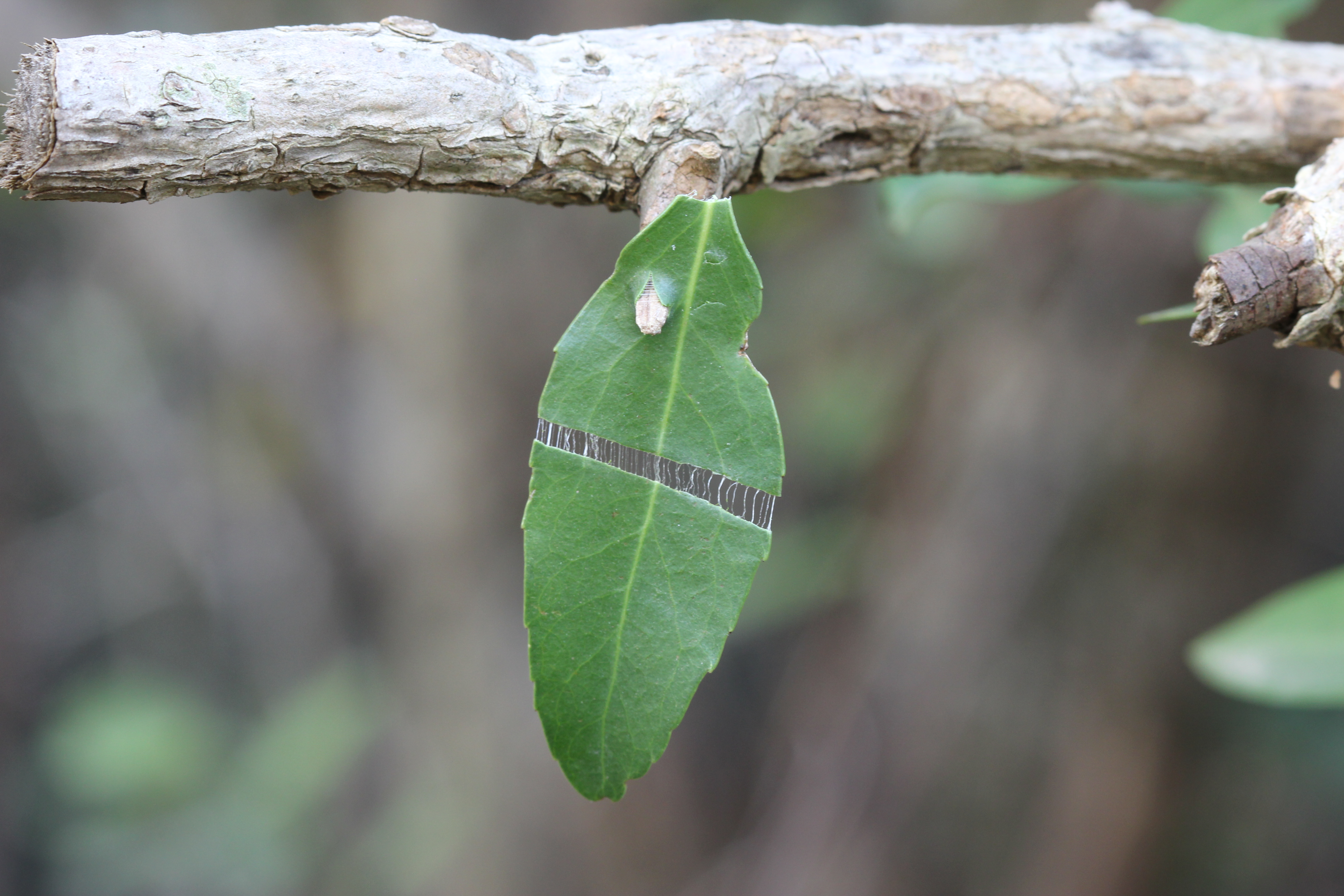
Maytenus acuminata leaf, showing "silk"
