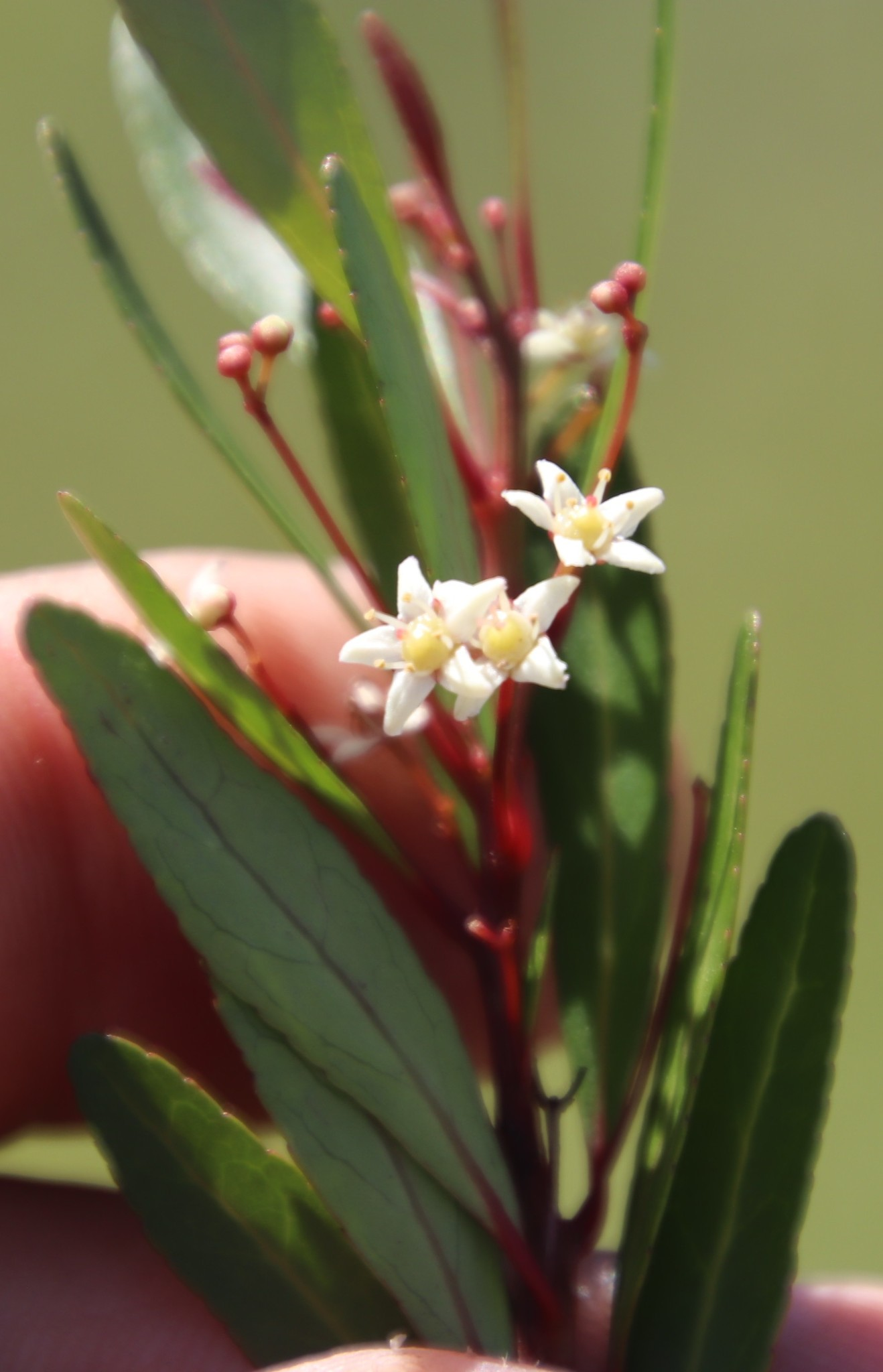

Conservation status
- Vulnerable (IUCN 3.1)

Scientific classification
- Kingdom: Plantae
- Clade: Tracheophytes
- Clade: Angiosperms
- Clade: Eudicots
- Clade: Rosids
- Order: Celastrales
- Family: Celastraceae
- Genus: Gymnosporia
- Species: G. bachmannii

Binomial name
- Gymnosporia bachmannii Loes.

Synonyms
- Maytenus bachmannii (Loes.) Marais (1960)

= Gymnosporia bachmannii =

Species of flowering plant

Gymnosporia bachmannii is a species of flowering plant in the family Celastraceae. It is a shrub or tree endemic to the Cape Provinces and KwaZulu-Natal in South Africa. It is threatened by habitat loss.
