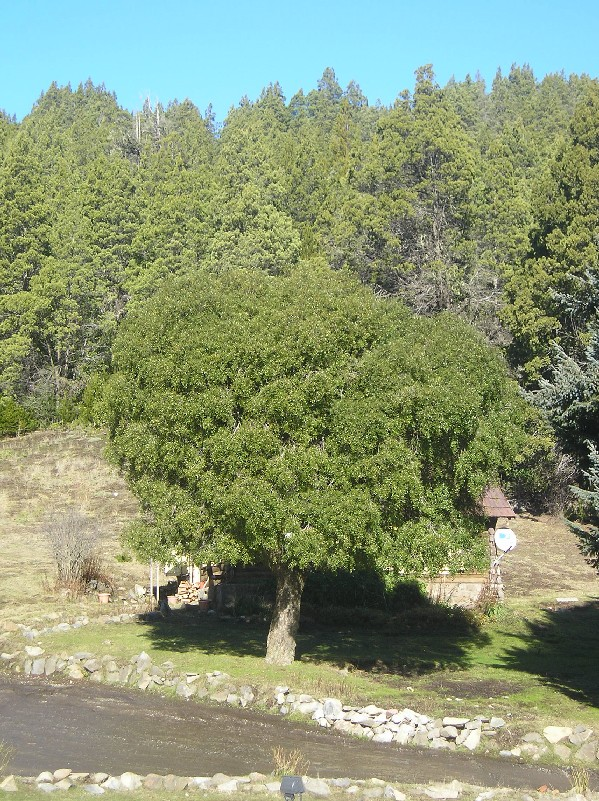
- Maytenus boaria, a tree of temperate climates

Scientific classification
- Kingdom: Plantae
- Clade: Tracheophytes
- Clade: Angiosperms
- Clade: Eudicots
- Clade: Rosids
- Order: Celastrales
- Family: Celastraceae
- Genus: Maytenus; Molina (1782)

Type species
- Maytenus boaria Molina (1782)

Species
- 176; see text

Synonyms
- Boaria A.DC. (1844); Euthalis Banks & Sol. ex Hook.f. (1845); Haenkea Ruiz & Pav. (1794), nom. illeg.; Monteverdia A.Rich. (1846); Moya Griseb. (1874); Scytophyllum Eckl. & Zeyh. (1835), nom. rej.; Senacia Lam. (1793); Tricerma Liebm. (1853)

= Maytenus =

Genus of flowering plants

Maytenus /ˈmeɪtɛnəs/ is a genus of flowering plants in the family Celastraceae. Members of the genus are distributed throughout Central and South America, Southeast Asia, Micronesia, and Australasia, the Indian Ocean and Africa. They grow in a very wide variety of climates, from tropical to subpolar. The traditional circumscription of Maytenus was paraphyletic, so many species have been transferred to Denhamia and Gymnosporia.

== Species ==
176 species are accepted.

- Maytenus abbottii A.E.van Wyk
- Maytenus acanthophylla Reissek
- Maytenus acuminata (L.f.) Loes.
- Maytenus agostinii Steyerm.
- Maytenus alaternoides Reissek
- Maytenus albata (N.E.Br.) E.Schmidt bis & Jordaan
- Maytenus amazonica Mart. ex Reissek
- Maytenus angolensis Exell & Mendonça
- Maytenus apiculata Steyerm.
- Maytenus apurimacensis Loes.
- Maytenus aquifolium (Mart.)
- Maytenus ardisiifolia Reissek
- Maytenus basidentata Reissek
- Maytenus belizensis Standl.
- Maytenus boaria Molina (type species)
- Maytenus boarioides Loes.
- Maytenus brasiliensis Mart.
- Maytenus buxifolia (A.Rich.) Griseb. (West Indies)
- Maytenus cajalbanica (Borhidi & O.Muñiz) Borhidi & O.Muñiz
- Maytenus cassineformis Reissek
- Maytenus cassinoides (Lam.) Urb.
- Maytenus catingarum Reissek
- Maytenus cestrifolia Reissek
- Maytenus chapadensis Carv.-Okano ex Biral & Groppo
- Maytenus chasei N.Robson
- Maytenus calzadae J.S.Ma
- Maytenus chiapensis Lundell
- Maytenus chubutensis (Speg.) Lourteig, O'Donell & Sleumer
- Maytenus clarendonensis Britton
- Maytenus cochlearifolia Griseb.
- Maytenus communis Reissek
- Maytenus comocladiiformis Reissek
- Maytenus conferta (Ruiz & Pav.) Loes.
- Maytenus cordata (E.Mey. ex Sond.) Loes.
- Maytenus corei Lundell
- Maytenus coriacea Steyerm.
- Maytenus crassipes Urb.
- Maytenus curranii S.F.Blake
- Maytenus cuzcoina Loes.
- Maytenus cymosa Krug & Urb. – Caribbean mayten
- Maytenus dasyclados Mart.
- Maytenus disticha (Hook.f.) Urb.
- Maytenus distichophylla Mart. ex Reissek
- Maytenus domingensis Krug & Urb.
- Maytenus duqueana Cuatrec.
- Maytenus durifolia Briq.
- Maytenus ebenifolia Reissek
- Maytenus eggersii Loes.
- Maytenus elaeodendroides Griseb.
- Maytenus elongata (Urb.) Britton – Puerto Rico mayten
- Maytenus erythroxylon Reissek
- Maytenus evonymoides Reissek
- Maytenus ficiformis Reissek
- Maytenus flagellata Rusby
- Maytenus floribunda Reissek
- Maytenus fugax Biral & Lombardi
- Maytenus glaucescens Reissek
- Maytenus gonoclados Mart.
- Maytenus gracilis Loes.
- Maytenus grenadensis Urb.
- Maytenus grisea Lundell
- Maytenus guatemalensis Lundell
- Maytenus guyanensis Klotzsch ex Reissek
- Maytenus haitiensis Urb.
- Maytenus harrisii Krug & Urb.
- Maytenus horrida Reissek
- Maytenus hotteana Urb.
- Maytenus huberi Steyerm.
- Maytenus ilicifolia Mart. ex Reissek
- Maytenus imbricata Mart. ex Reissek
- Maytenus inflata S.J.Pei & Y.H.Li
- Maytenus insculpta Steyerm.
- Maytenus jamaicensis Krug & Urb.
- Maytenus jamesonii Briq.
- Maytenus jefeana Lundell
- Maytenus jelskii Szyszył.
- Maytenus kanukuensis A.C.Sm.
- Maytenus karstenii Reissek
- Maytenus laevigata (Vahl) Griseb. ex Eggers – White cinnamon
- Maytenus laevis Reissek
- Maytenus laurina Briq.
- Maytenus laxiflora Triana & Planch.
- Maytenus lineata C.Wright ex Griseb.
- Maytenus listeri (Prain) D.C.S.Raju & Babu
- Maytenus littoralis Carv.-Okano
- Maytenus loeseneri Urb.
- Maytenus longifolia Reissek ex Loes.
- Maytenus longistipitata Steyerm.
- Maytenus lucayana Britton
- Maytenus lucida (L.) Loes.
- Maytenus macrocarpa (Ruiz & Pav.) Briq.
- Maytenus magellanica (Lam.) Hook.f.
- Maytenus manabiensis Loes.
- Maytenus matudae Lundell
- Maytenus mayana Lundell
- Maytenus megalocarpa Groppo & Lombardi
- Maytenus meguillensis Rusby
- Maytenus meridensis (Pittier) Cuatrec.
- Maytenus microcarpa Fawc. & Rendle
- Maytenus microphylla Urb., Ekman & Loes.
- Maytenus monodii Exell
- Maytenus monticola Sandwith
- Maytenus mornicola Urb. & Ekman
- Maytenus mucugensis Carv.-Okano ex Biral & Groppo
- Maytenus myrsinoides Reissek
- Maytenus neblinae Steyerm.
- Maytenus nitida Mart.
- Maytenus oblongata Reissek
- Maytenus obtusifolia Mart.
- Maytenus ocoensis M.M.Mejía & Zanoni
- Maytenus oleoides Loes.
- Maytenus oleosa A.E.van Wyk & R.H.Archer
- Maytenus opaca Reissek
- Maytenus orbicularis (Humb. & Bonpl. ex Schult.) Loes.
- Maytenus parvifolia Steyerm.
- Maytenus patens Reissek
- Maytenus pavonii Briq.
- Maytenus peduncularis (Sond.) Loes.
- Maytenus peruana (Loes.) Liesner
- Maytenus phyllanthoides Benth. – Florida mayten, guttapercha mayten
- Maytenus pittieriana Steyerm.
- Maytenus planifolia A.C.Sm.
- Maytenus ponceana Britton
- Maytenus procumbens (L.f.) Loes.
- Maytenus pruinosa Reissek
- Maytenus prunifolia C.Presl
- Maytenus psammophila Biral & Lombardi
- Maytenus pseudoboaria Loes.
- Maytenus purpusii Lundell
- Maytenus pustulata Steyerm.
- Maytenus quadrangulata (Schrad.) Loes.
- Maytenus radlkoferiana Loes.
- Maytenus recondita Hammel
- Maytenus reflexa Urb.
- Maytenus repanda Turcz.
- Maytenus retusa (Poir.) Briq.
- Maytenus revoluta Alain
- Maytenus reynosioides Urb.
- Maytenus rigida Mart.
- Maytenus robustoides Loes.
- Maytenus rupestris Pirani & Carv.-Okano
- Maytenus salicifolia Reissek
- Maytenus samydiformis Reissek
- Maytenus saxicola Britton & P.Wilson
- Maytenus schippii Lundell
- Maytenus schumanniana Loes.
- Maytenus segoviarum Standl. & L.O.Williams
- Maytenus serpentini (Borhidi & O.Muñiz) Borhidi & O.Muñiz
- Maytenus sieberiana Krug & Urb.
- Maytenus spinosa (Griseb.) Lourteig & O'Donell
- Maytenus splendens Urb.
- Maytenus sprucei Briq.
- Maytenus stipitata Lundell
- Maytenus subalata Reissek
- Maytenus suboppositifolia Cuatrec.
- Maytenus tetragona Griseb.
- Maytenus theoides (Benth.) Urb.
- Maytenus tikalensis Lundell
- Maytenus trianae Briq.
- Maytenus truncata (Nees) Reissek
- Maytenus tunarina Loes.
- Maytenus umbellata (R.Br.) Mabb.
- Maytenus undata (Thunb.) Blakelock
- Maytenus urbaniana Loes.
- Maytenus urbanii Alain
- Maytenus urquiolae Mory
- Maytenus versluysii Bold.
- Maytenus verticillata (Ruiz & Pav.) DC.
- Maytenus vexata Briq.
- Maytenus virens Urb.
- Maytenus viscifolia Griseb.
- Maytenus vitis-idaea Griseb. – Indian's salt
- Maytenus wendtii Lundell
- Maytenus williamsii A.Molina
- Maytenus woodsonii Lundell

Undescribed species:

- Maytenus sp. nov. A Miller (Yemen)

=== Formerly placed here ===
- Denhamia bilocularis (F.Muell.) M.P.Simmons – Orangebark (as M. bilocularis (F.Muell.) Loes.)
- Denhamia cunninghamii (Hook.) M.P.Simmons – Koonkara (as M. cunninghamii (Hook.) Loes.)
- Denhamia disperma (F.Muell.) M.P.Simmons (as M. disperma (F.Muell.) Loes.)
- Denhamia fasciculiflora (Jessup) M.P.Simmons (as M. fasciculiflora Jessup)
- Denhamia muelleri (Benth.) Jessup (as M. ferdinandi Jessup)
- Denhamia silvestris (Lander & L.A.S.Johnson) M.P. Simmons (as M. silvestris Lander & L.A.S.Johnson) – Narrow-leaved orangebark, orange bark, orange bush
- Gymnosporia addat Loes. (as M. addat (Loes.) Sebsebe)
- Gymnosporia austroyunnanensis (S.J. Pei & Y.H. Li) M.P. Simmons (as M. austroyunnanensis S.J.Pei & Y.H.Li)
- Gymnosporia cassinoides (L'Hér.) Masf. (as M. canariensis (Loes.) G.Kunkel & Sunding or M. dryandri var. canariensis Loes.)
- Gymnosporia dhofarensis (Sebsebe) Jordaan (as M. dhofarensis Sebsebe)
- Gymnosporia diversifolia Maxim. (as M. diversifolia (Maxim.) Ding Hou)
- Gymnosporia harenensis (Sebsebe) Jordaan (as M. harenensis Sebsebe)
- Gymnosporia heterophylla (Eckl. & Zeyh.) Loes. (as M. heterophylla (Eckl. & Zeyh.) N. Robson)
- Gymnosporia nemorosa (Eckl. & Zeyh.) Szyszyl. (as M. nemorosa (Eckl. & Zeyh.) Marais)
- Gymnosporia rothiana (Walp.) Wight & Arn. ex M.A.Lawson (as M. rothiana (Walp.) Lobr.-Callen)
- Gymnosporia royleana Wall. ex M.A.Lawson (as M. royleana (Wall. ex M. A. Lawson) Cufod.)
- Gymnosporia senegalensis (Lam.) Loes. (as M. senegalensis (Lam.) Exell)
- Gymnosporia stylosa Pierre (as M. stylosa (Pierre) Lobr.-Callen or M. curtisii (King) Ding Hou)
- Gymnosporia thomsonii Kurz (as M. thomsonii (Kurz) V.S.Raju & Babu)

== Cultivation and uses ==
Maytenus boaria and Maytenus magellanica are the most known species in Europe and the United States because these are the most cold-tolerant trees of this mostly tropical genus. The bark of Maytenus krukovii has a variety of documented medicinal properties; it is also sometimes admixed into decoctions of ayahuasca.
