= Reissita =

Scientific classification
- Kingdom: Animalia
- Phylum: Arthropoda
- Class: Insecta
- Order: Lepidoptera
- Family: Zygaenidae
- Subfamily: Zygaeninae
- Genus: Reissita; Tremewan, 1959
- Species: R. simonyi

Binomial name
- Reissita simonyi (Rebel, 1899)

Synonyms
- Zygaena simonyi Rebel, 1899

Species of moth

Reissita simonyi, the Arabian burnet moth, is a species of diurnal moth of the Zygaenidae family. It is the only species from the genus Reissita, and native to the southern part of the Arabian Peninsula. It resembles some species from the related genus Zygaena, and like them Reissita simonyi is toxic because it is able to biosynthesize hydrogen cyanide. The larvae feed on Maytenus, specifically M. dhofarensis and M. senegalensis.

It has two subspecies:

- R. s. simonyi at altitudes of 400–2,900 metres (1,300–9,500 ft) in Oman and eastern Yemen. Blackish with a bluish sheen and red spots.
- R. s. yemenicola at altitudes of 350–900 metres (1,150–2,950 ft) in western Yemen and southwestern Saudi Arabia. Smaller than previous, and blackish with a greenish-blue sheen and red spots, or all red (some males only).
