= Maytenus disticha =

- Maytenus disticha in Parque Nacional Conguillio, Chile

Scientific classification
- Kingdom: Plantae
- Clade: Tracheophytes
- Clade: Angiosperms
- Clade: Eudicots
- Clade: Rosids
- Order: Celastrales
- Family: Celastraceae
- Genus: Maytenus
- Species: M. disticha

Binomial name
- Maytenus disticha (Hook.f.) Urb.

Species of plant

Maytenus disticha is a species of flowering plant in the family Celastraceae. It is a shrub native to Chile and Argentina. In Chile, it is distributed from the Maule to the Magallanes regions. It is one of the four Maytenus species native to Chile alongside Maytenus boaria, Maytenus chubutensis and Maytenus magellanica.
