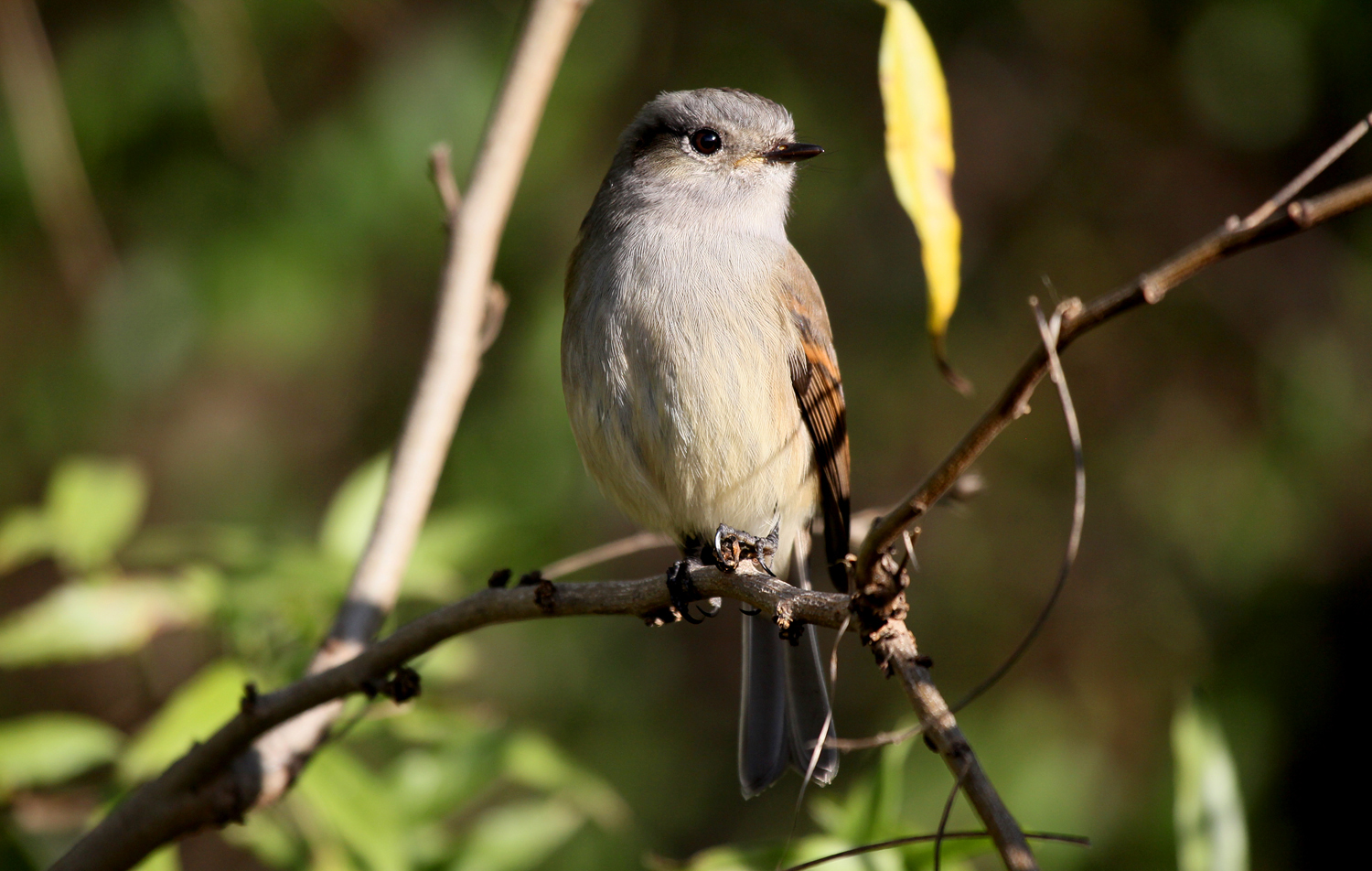

Conservation status
- Least Concern (IUCN 3.1)

Scientific classification
- Kingdom: Animalia
- Phylum: Chordata
- Class: Aves
- Order: Passeriformes
- Family: Tyrannidae
- Genus: Colorhamphus; Sundevall, 1872
- Species: C. parvirostris

Binomial name
- Colorhamphus parvirostris (Gould & Gray, GR, 1839)
- Non-Breeding Breeding Its year-round range is included within the breeding range shown; see the Breeding section

Synonyms
- See text

= Patagonian tyrant =

Species of bird

The Patagonian tyrant (Colorhamphus parvirostris) is a species of bird in the family Tyrannidae, the tyrant flycatchers. It is found in Argentina and Chile.

== Taxonomy and systematics ==
The Patagonian tyrant was originally described as Myiobius parvirostris. It successively had many reassignments as Tyrannula parvirostris, Serpophaga parvirostris, Elainea murina, and Muscicapa parvirostris before attaining its current binomial Colorhamphus parvirostris in the late 1800s. However, at least one late twentieth century author called it Ochthoeca parvirostris, and a 2020 publication suggested that was its proper binomial.

The Patagonian tyrant is the only member of genus Colorhamphus and has no subspecies.

== Description ==
The Patagonian tyrant is 12 to 13 cm (4.7 to 5.1 in) long. The sexes have essentially the same plumage though females sometimes have a darker throat than males. Adults have a mostly gray head with a darker brownish gray crown and a blackish streak behind the eye. Their upperparts are olive-brown. Their wings are blackish brown with wide cinnamon edges on the coverts that show as two wing bars. Their tail is blackish brown. Their throat and underparts are grayish with a yellowish wash on the belly, flanks, and undertail coverts. They have a black iris, a black bill, and black legs and feet. Juveniles' crown is the same gray as the rest of the head. They have some rufous in their upperparts and darker underparts with a stronger yellowish wash than adults.

== Distribution and habitat ==
The Patagonian tyrant is found from north-central Chile's Coquimbo Region and southern Argentina's Neuquén and Río Negro provinces south to Tierra del Fuego. In the breeding season it almost exclusively inhabits Nothofagus forest. In the non-breeding season it is found in Nothofagus and also a more diverse selection of denser, more humid forest types and also urban areas, parks, and gardens. In elevation it ranges from sea level to 1,800 m (5,900 ft) in the breeding season and as high as 2,000 m (6,600 ft) at other times. There is a single record at 2,700 m (8,900 ft).

== Behavior ==
=== Movement ===
The Patagonian tyrant is a nearly complete migrant. It breeds from Tierra del Fuego north, in Chile to the Biobío Region and in Argentina to Neuquén and Río Negro provinces. For the austral winter it vacates most of its breeding range. Small numbers remain in the north of the breeding range, in Chile from southern Los Lagos Region and in Argentina from northern Chubut Province. It is usually found only in winter from Chile's Biobío Region north to the Coquimbo Region. There are a few records of vagrants further north than the species' normal range.

=== Feeding ===
The Patagonian tyrant feeds primarily on insects. Its diet also includes other arthropods and some small fruits such as those of maytén and leñadura. It mostly forages singly or in pairs and sometimes joins mixed-species feeding flocks. It captures most prey in mid-air with sallies from a perch but also takes it from vegetation and the ground.

=== Breeding ===
The Patagonian tyrant's breeding season has not been fully defined but appears to span at least October to February. Its nest is a cup made from straw, dried grass, and other vegetable fibers and is sometimes lined with moss. Some nests have also included dry leaves and lichens. The nest is placed in the understory of Nothofagus forest, often in Chusquea bamboo, and usually within about 3 m (10 ft) of the ground. The clutch is two to three eggs that are whitish or cream with red or reddish brown spots. Which sex incubates the clutch, the incubation period, and the time to fledging are not known. Both parents provision nestlings.

=== Vocalization ===
The Patagonian tyrant's most frequently heard song is "a long, descending whistle, often repeated every three to four seconds", into which it sometimes mixes shorter whistles. It less often sings a "more complex vocalization containing three distinct phrases". Its calls are "variable, high-pitched, long and clear whistled notes" that are somewhat similar to the primary song. It sings and calls throughout the day.

== Status ==
The IUCN has assessed the Patagonian tyrant as being of Least Concern. It has a large range; its population size is not known and is believed to be stable. No immediate threats have been identified. It is considered uncommon in its breeding range and extremely rare in the far southern part of it. It is also rare in the central and southern parts of its non-breeding range and somewhat more common in the smaller winter-only range. "Although it has the status of Least Concern, it could be affected by habitat loss and degradation, mainly due to land use for urbanization, agriculture and forestry activities, as well as fires." Most of its habitat in Chile is not protected.
