= Maytenus cymosa =

Conservation status
- Endangered (IUCN 3.1)

Scientific classification
- Kingdom: Plantae
- Clade: Tracheophytes
- Clade: Angiosperms
- Clade: Eudicots
- Clade: Rosids
- Order: Celastrales
- Family: Celastraceae
- Genus: Maytenus
- Species: M. cymosa

Binomial name
- Maytenus cymosa Krug & Urb.

Species of tree

Maytenus cymosa, also called Caribbean mayten, is a species of plant in the family Celastraceae. It is found in Puerto Rico, the British Virgin Islands, and the U.S. Virgin Islands.
