= Maytenus jamesonii =

Conservation status
- Endangered (IUCN 3.1)

Scientific classification
- Kingdom: Plantae
- Clade: Tracheophytes
- Clade: Angiosperms
- Clade: Eudicots
- Clade: Rosids
- Order: Celastrales
- Family: Celastraceae
- Genus: Maytenus
- Species: M. jamesonii

Binomial name
- Maytenus jamesonii Briq.

Species of tree

Maytenus jamesonii is a species of plant in the family Celastraceae. It is a tree endemic to Ecuador. Its natural habitat is subtropical or tropical moist montane forests. It is threatened by habitat loss.
