= Denhamia megacarpa =

Conservation status
- Endangered (EPBC Act)

Scientific classification
- Kingdom: Plantae
- Clade: Embryophytes
- Clade: Tracheophytes
- Clade: Spermatophytes
- Clade: Angiosperms
- Clade: Eudicots
- Clade: Rosids
- Order: Celastrales
- Family: Celastraceae
- Genus: Denhamia
- Species: D. megacarpa

Binomial name
- Denhamia megacarpa J.J.Halford & Jessup

Synonyms
- Denhamia sp. Junee Tableland

Species of shrub

Denhamia megacarpa, commonly known as the large-fruited denhamia, is a species of tree which is endemic to coastal central Queensland, Australia.

== Conservation status ==
Denhamia megacarpa is listed as "endangered" under the Queensland Nature Conservation Act 1992. It was changed from least concern to critically endangered in 2020 by the Queensland Government. It is also classified under the Australian Government Environment Protection and Biodiversity Conservation Act 1999 as endangered.
