= Maytenus manabiensis =

Conservation status
- Endangered (IUCN 3.1)

Scientific classification
- Kingdom: Plantae
- Clade: Tracheophytes
- Clade: Angiosperms
- Clade: Eudicots
- Clade: Rosids
- Order: Celastrales
- Family: Celastraceae
- Genus: Maytenus
- Species: M. manabiensis

Binomial name
- Maytenus manabiensis Loes.

Synonyms
- Monteverdia manabiensis (Loes.) Biral

Species of tree

Maytenus manabiensis is a species of plant in the family Celastraceae. It is a tree endemic to Ecuador. Its natural habitat is subtropical or tropical moist lowland forests. It is threatened by habitat loss.
