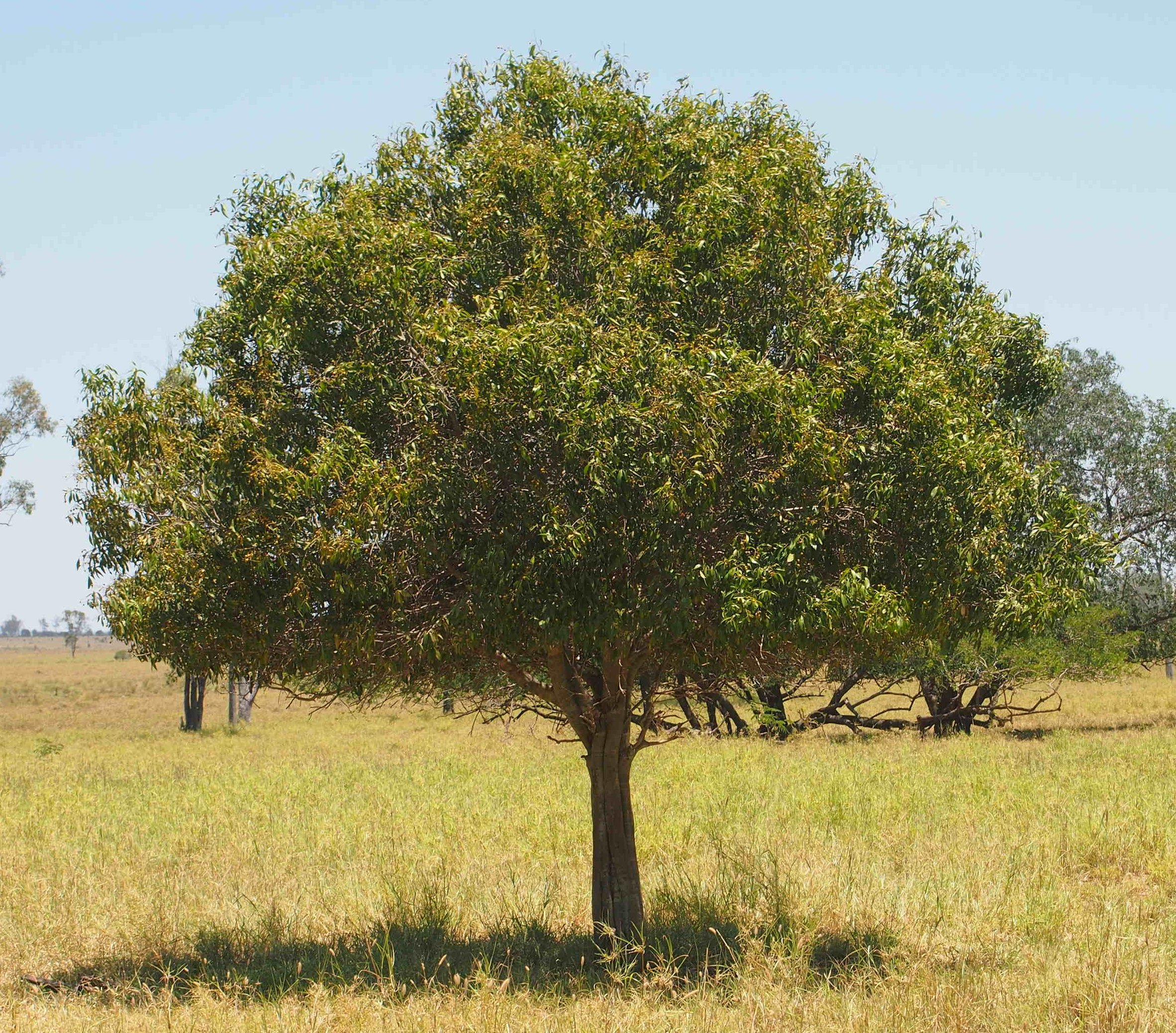
- Denhamia oleaster

Scientific classification
- Kingdom: Plantae
- Clade: Tracheophytes
- Clade: Angiosperms
- Clade: Eudicots
- Clade: Rosids
- Order: Celastrales
- Family: Celastraceae
- Genus: Denhamia
- Species: D. oleaster

Binomial name
- Denhamia oleaster (Lindl.) F.Muell.

Synonyms
- Melicytus oleaster Lindl. Leucocarpum oleaster (Lindl.) F.Muell.

= Denhamia oleaster =

Species of flowering plant

Denhamia oleaster is a shrub or small tree within the family Celastraceae, endemic to Queensland. The species inhabits a variety of environments, from monsoon forest to semi-arid savanna and occurs on a broad range of soil types. In more humid locales the species can grow to 6 metres in height, although it may not reach more than 1 metre in less favourable environments.

John Lindley described the plant as Melicytus oleaster in 1848, it being discovered on explorer Sir Thomas Mitchell's expeditions into northern Australia.

Denhamia oleaster is found in across inland Queensland in open woodland and scrubland in the Brigalow Belt, as well as wetter monsoon forests in the northern reaches of its distribution. it is often associated with brigalow (Acacia harpophylla).

The timber is valued for wood turning.

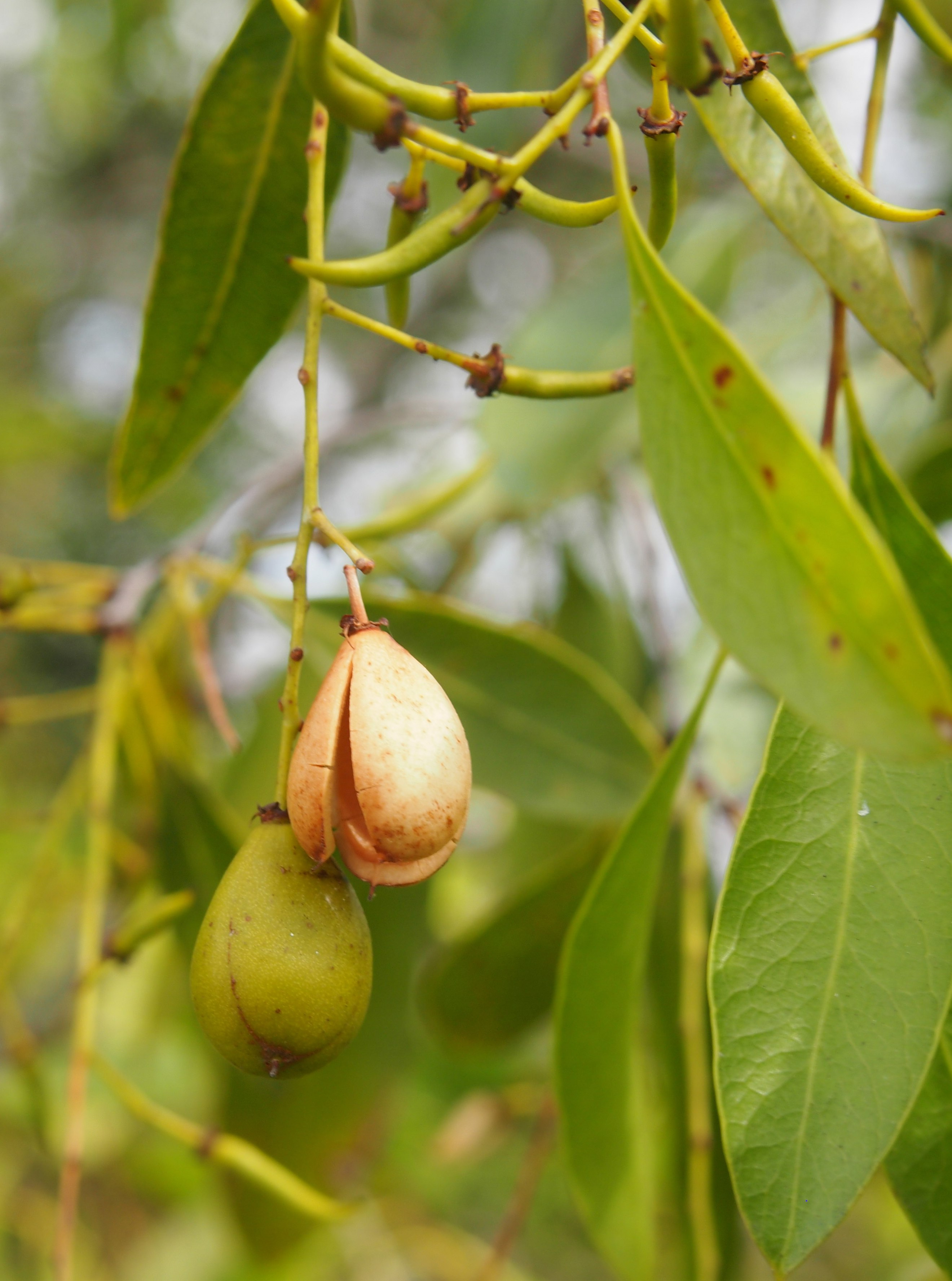
Fruit of D. oleaster.
