= Maytenus crassipes =

Conservation status
- Near Threatened (IUCN 2.3)

Scientific classification
- Kingdom: Plantae
- Clade: Tracheophytes
- Clade: Angiosperms
- Clade: Eudicots
- Clade: Rosids
- Order: Celastrales
- Family: Celastraceae
- Genus: Maytenus
- Species: M. crassipes

Binomial name
- Maytenus crassipes Urb.

Species of flowering plant

Maytenus crassipes is a species of plant in the family Celastraceae. It is endemic to central and western Jamaica. It was documented by William H. Harris (1860-1920) and the name “Maytenus crassipes” was named by a German botanist Ignatz Urban.

Harris work d in Jamaica.
