= Zutulba namaqua =

Scientific classification
- Kingdom: Animalia
- Phylum: Arthropoda
- Class: Insecta
- Order: Lepidoptera
- Family: Zygaenidae
- Genus: Zutulba
- Species: Z. namaqua

Binomial name
- Zutulba namaqua (Boisduval, 1847)

Synonyms
- Zygaena namaqua Boisduval, 1847; Zutulba ampla (Walker, 1854); Zutulba transversalis (Westwood, 1889); Zygaena octo Mabille, 1892

Species of moth

Zutulba namaqua is a moth of the family Zygaenidae. It is known from the Democratic Republic of the Congo, Namibia and South Africa.

== Subspecies ==
- Zutulba namaqua namaqua (South Africa)
- Zutulba namaqua zelleri (Wallengren, 1860) (Democratic Republic of Congo, Namibia, South Africa)
