= Maytenus matudae =

Conservation status
- Endangered (IUCN 3.1)

Scientific classification
- Kingdom: Plantae
- Clade: Tracheophytes
- Clade: Angiosperms
- Clade: Eudicots
- Clade: Rosids
- Order: Celastrales
- Family: Celastraceae
- Genus: Maytenus
- Species: M. matudae

Binomial name
- Maytenus matudae Lundell

Synonyms
- Monteverdia matudae (Lundell) Biral

Species of tree

Maytenus matudae is a species of flowering plant in the family Celastraceae. It is endemic to Mexico.
