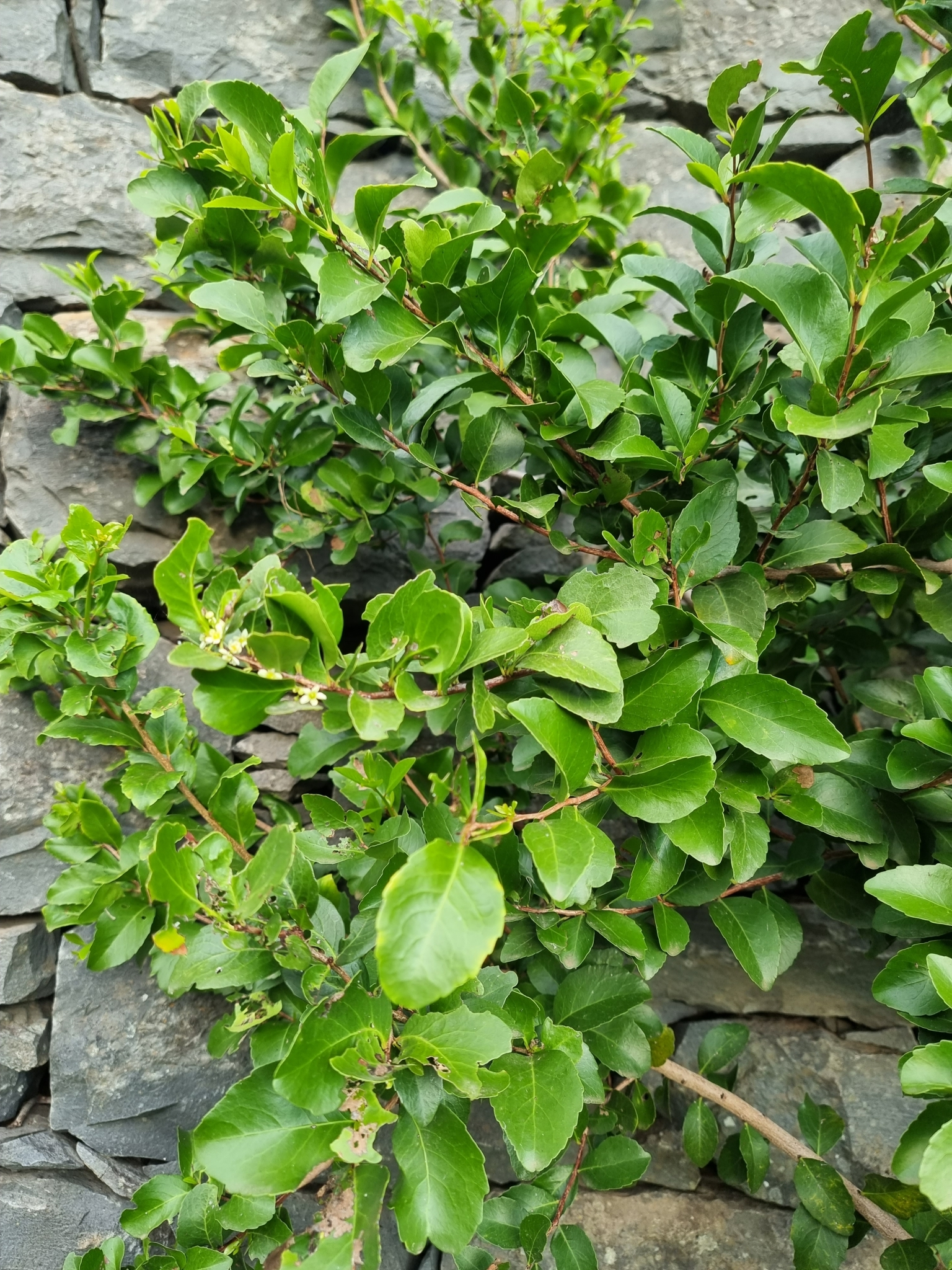

Conservation status
- Least Concern (IUCN 3.1)

Scientific classification
- Kingdom: Plantae
- Clade: Tracheophytes
- Clade: Angiosperms
- Clade: Eudicots
- Clade: Rosids
- Order: Celastrales
- Family: Celastraceae
- Genus: Maytenus
- Species: M. umbellata

Binomial name
- Maytenus umbellata (R.Br.) Mabb. (1981)

Synonyms
- Catha dryandrii Lowe (1862), nom. superfl.; Celastrus umbellatus R.Br. (1828); Gymnosporia dryandri Masf. (1881), nom. superfl.; Maytenus dryandri Loes. (1942), nom. superfl.

= Maytenus umbellata =

Species of flowering plant

Maytenus umbellata is a species of flowering plant in the family Celastraceae. Common names include Buxo-da-rocha and Madeira shrubby bittersweet. It is endemic to Madeira.

== Description ==
It is a small evergreen tree or shrub growing up to 5 meters high.

== Habitat and ecology ==
Maytenus umbellata is native to the Madeira and neighboring islands in the archipelago. It is found from sea level to 400 meters elevation, in woodlands and shrublands with Olea europaea and Ceratonia siliqua, and in lower-elevation laurel forests with Laurus azorica, Ocotea foetens, and other species.
