= Maytenus microcarpa =

Conservation status
- Vulnerable (IUCN 2.3)

Scientific classification
- Kingdom: Plantae
- Clade: Tracheophytes
- Clade: Angiosperms
- Clade: Eudicots
- Clade: Rosids
- Order: Celastrales
- Family: Celastraceae
- Genus: Maytenus
- Species: M. microcarpa

Binomial name
- Maytenus microcarpa Fawc. & Rendle

Species of flowering plant

Maytenus microcarpa is a species of plant in the family Celastraceae. It is endemic to Jamaica.
