= Zutulba =

Scientific classification
- Kingdom: Animalia
- Phylum: Arthropoda
- Class: Insecta
- Order: Lepidoptera
- Family: Zygaenidae
- Subfamily: Zygaeninae
- Genus: Zutulba; Kirby, 1892

Synonyms
- Anteris Wallengren, 1865

Genus of moths

Zutulba namaqua, a genus of moths of the family Zygaenidae, are found in temperate regions. Majority of the tropical species, commonly called foresters moths, have bright prominent spots containing hydrogen cyanide for warning predators. These toxins allow the moths to have mimicry.

== Species ==
- Zutulba namaqua (Boisduval, 1847)
- Zutulba ocellaris (Felder, 1874)
