= Zutulba ocellaris =

Scientific classification
- Domain: Eukaryota
- Kingdom: Animalia
- Phylum: Arthropoda
- Class: Insecta
- Order: Lepidoptera
- Family: Zygaenidae
- Genus: Zutulba
- Species: Z. ocellaris

Binomial name
- Zutulba ocellaris (Felder, 1874)

Species of moth

Zutulba ocellaris is a moth of the family Zygaenidae. It is found in South Africa.
