= Maytenus harrisii =

Conservation status
- Critically Endangered (IUCN 3.1)

Scientific classification
- Kingdom: Plantae
- Clade: Embryophytes
- Clade: Tracheophytes
- Clade: Spermatophytes
- Clade: Angiosperms
- Clade: Eudicots
- Clade: Rosids
- Order: Celastrales
- Family: Celastraceae
- Genus: Maytenus
- Species: M. harrisii

Binomial name
- Maytenus harrisii Krug & Urb.

Synonyms
- Monteverdia harrisii (Krug & Urb.) Biral

Species of flowering plant

Maytenus harrisii is a species of flowering plant in the family Celastraceae. It is a tree endemic to Jamaica. It grows primarily in the wet tropical biome.
