= Maytenus ponceana =

Conservation status
- Vulnerable (IUCN 2.3)

Scientific classification
- Kingdom: Plantae
- Clade: Tracheophytes
- Clade: Angiosperms
- Clade: Eudicots
- Clade: Rosids
- Order: Celastrales
- Family: Celastraceae
- Genus: Maytenus
- Species: M. ponceana

Binomial name
- Maytenus ponceana Britt.

Species of plant

Maytenus ponceana, the Ponce mayten, is a species of plant in the family Celastraceae. It is endemic to Puerto Rico.
