= Maytenus aquifolium =

Scientific classification
- Kingdom: Plantae
- Clade: Tracheophytes
- Clade: Angiosperms
- Clade: Eudicots
- Clade: Rosids
- Order: Celastrales
- Family: Celastraceae
- Genus: Maytenus
- Species: M. aquifolium

Binomial name
- Maytenus aquifolium Mart.

Synonyms
- Monteverdia aquifolium (Mart.) Biral (2017)

Species of shrub

Maytenus aquifolium, the espinheira-santa, is an endemic tree (sometimes shrub) species endemic to the Atlantic Forest biome in southeastern Brazil.

== Distribution ==
It is native to the regions of Sudeste − in Minas Gerais, Rio de Janeiro and São Paulo states; and of Sul − in Paraná, Santa Catarina and Rio Grande do Sul states.

== Uses ==
It is a medicinal species, being used for treating ulcers and gastritis.

Conservation

Indiscriminate usage is threatening the survival of this species in its natural habitat.
