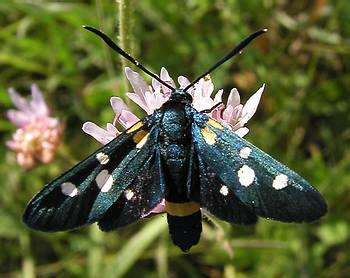
- Zygaena ephialtes

Scientific classification
- Kingdom: Animalia
- Phylum: Arthropoda
- Class: Insecta
- Order: Lepidoptera
- Family: Zygaenidae
- Subfamily: Zygaeninae; Latreille, 1809

= Zygaeninae =

Subfamily of moths

The Zygaeninae are a subfamily of the Zygaenidae family of moths. These are day-flying moths. Species of the genus Zygaena are native to the West Palearctic, while the genus Reissita is found on the Arabian Peninsula. They are able to biosynthesise hydrogen cyanide, and their bright patterns are warning colours to potential predators.

== Genera ==
- Neurosymploca Wallengren, 1858
- Praezygaena Alberti, 1954
- Reissita Tremewan, 1959
- Zutulba Kirby, 1892
- Zygaena Fabricius, 1775
