= Maytenus stipitata =

Conservation status
- Endangered (IUCN 3.1)

Scientific classification
- Kingdom: Plantae
- Clade: Tracheophytes
- Clade: Angiosperms
- Clade: Eudicots
- Clade: Rosids
- Order: Celastrales
- Family: Celastraceae
- Genus: Maytenus
- Species: M. stipitata

Binomial name
- Maytenus stipitata Lundell

Synonyms
- Monteverdia stipitata (Lundell) Biral

Species of tree

Maytenus stipitata is a species of flowering plant in the family Celastraceae. It is a tree endemic to the Mexican state of Chiapas.
