= Maytenus williamsii =

Conservation status
- Critically Endangered (IUCN 2.3)

Scientific classification
- Kingdom: Plantae
- Clade: Tracheophytes
- Clade: Angiosperms
- Clade: Eudicots
- Clade: Rosids
- Order: Celastrales
- Family: Celastraceae
- Genus: Maytenus
- Species: M. williamsii

Binomial name
- Maytenus williamsii A.Molina

Species of tree

Maytenus williamsii is a species of plant in the family Celastraceae. It is endemic to Honduras.
