= Maytenus eggersii =

Conservation status
- Data Deficient (IUCN 3.1)

Scientific classification
- Kingdom: Plantae
- Clade: Embryophytes
- Clade: Tracheophytes
- Clade: Spermatophytes
- Clade: Angiosperms
- Clade: Eudicots
- Clade: Rosids
- Order: Celastrales
- Family: Celastraceae
- Genus: Maytenus
- Species: M. eggersii

Binomial name
- Maytenus eggersii Loes.

Synonyms
- Monteverdia eggersii (Loes.) Biral

Species of tree

Maytenus eggersii is a species of flowering plant in the family Celastraceae. It is a tree endemic to Ecuador. It is threatened by habitat loss.
