= Maytenus macrocarpa =

Conservation status
- Least Concern (IUCN 3.1)

Scientific classification
- Kingdom: Plantae
- Clade: Tracheophytes
- Clade: Angiosperms
- Clade: Eudicots
- Clade: Rosids
- Order: Celastrales
- Family: Celastraceae
- Genus: Maytenus
- Species: M. macrocarpa

Binomial name
- Maytenus macrocarpa (Ruiz & Pav.) Briq.

Synonyms
- Celastrus macrocarpus Ruiz & Pav. (1802); Haenkea multiflora Ruiz & Pav. (1798); Maytenus chuchuhuasha Raym.-Hamet & Colas (1937), no Latin descr.; Maytenus krukovii A.C.Sm. (1939); Maytenus multiflora Reissek (1861); Maytenus multiflora (Ruiz & Pav.) Loes. (1905), nom. illeg.; Maytenus tarapotensis Briq. (1919); Monteverdia krukovii (A.C.Sm.) Biral (2017); Monteverdia macrocarpa (Ruiz & Pav.) Biral (2017)

Species of tree

Maytenus macrocarpa is a tree species native to the Amazon rainforest; it grows in Bolivia, Colombia, Ecuador, Peru, Venezuela, and northern Brazil. With a maximum recorded height of about 30 metres (98 ft), and leaves that span up to 30 centimetres (12 in) wide, this large tree contributes significantly to the forest canopy.

In the Quechua languages the tree is called chuchuhuasi (alternately spelled chuchuasi) or chuchuhuasha (alternately spelled chucchu huashu, and sometimes shortened to chuchasha). This name in all its permutations means "trembling back", due to the bark's effectiveness in relieving back pain, as well as the discomforts of arthritis and rheumatism. Indigenous peoples of the Amazon drink decoctions and tinctures of the bark as an herbal tonic. Extracts of the bark of M. krukovii are antioxidant and somewhat antimutagenic. A person can chew the bark, but it tastes very bitter.
