= Maytenus sp. nov. A =

Conservation status
- Vulnerable (IUCN 3.1)

Scientific classification
- Kingdom: Plantae
- Clade: Tracheophytes
- Clade: Angiosperms
- Clade: Eudicots
- Clade: Rosids
- Order: Celastrales
- Family: Celastraceae
- Genus: Maytenus
- Species: M. sp. nov. A

Binomial name
- Maytenus sp. nov. A Miller

Species of flowering plant

Maytenus sp. nov. A is a species of plant in the family Celastraceae. It is endemic to Yemen. Its natural habitats are subtropical or tropical dry forest and rocky areas.
