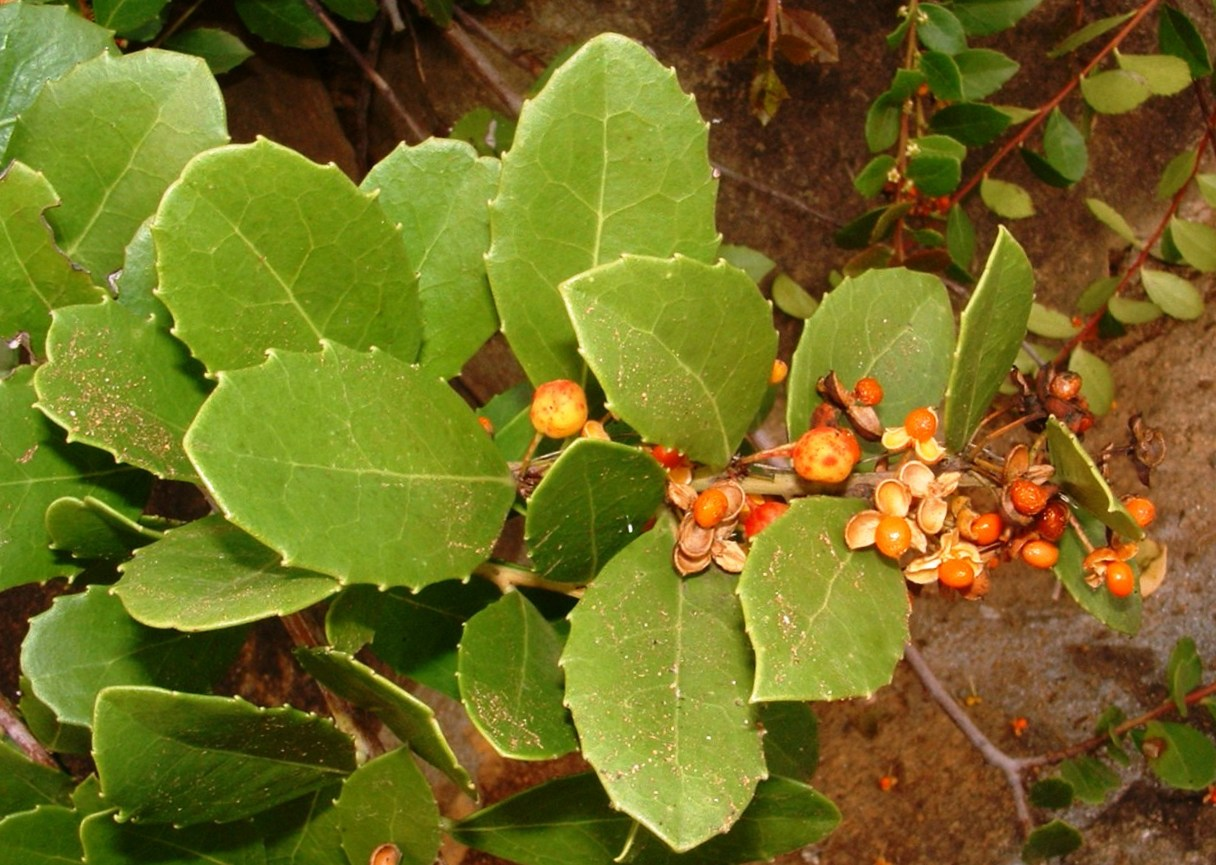

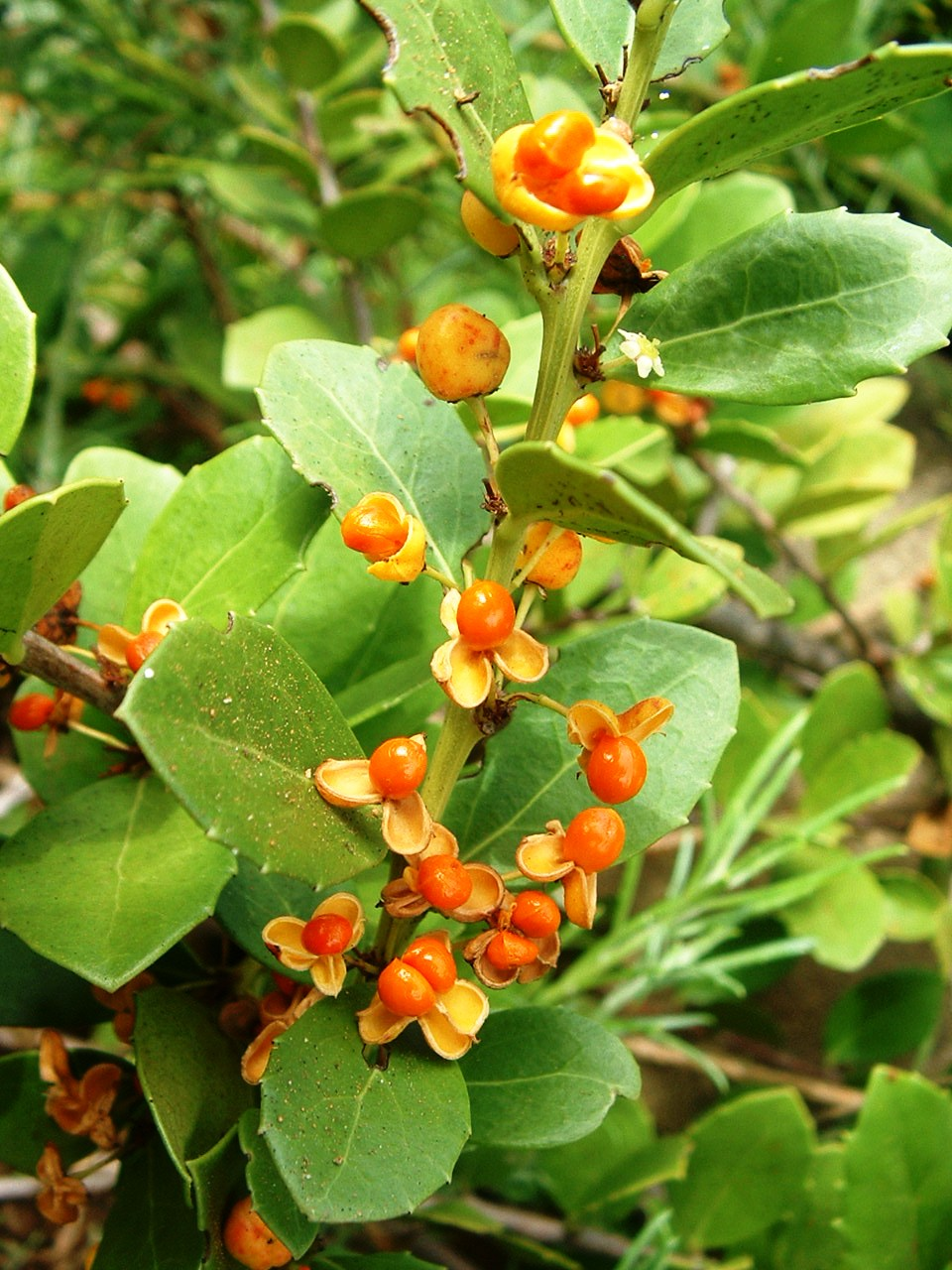

Scientific classification
- Kingdom: Plantae
- Clade: Tracheophytes
- Clade: Angiosperms
- Clade: Eudicots
- Clade: Rosids
- Order: Celastrales
- Family: Celastraceae
- Genus: Maytenus
- Species: M. procumbens

Binomial name
- Maytenus procumbens (L.f.) Loes.

= Maytenus procumbens =

Species of shrub

Maytenus procumbens, commonly known as the dune koko tree (Afrikaans: duinekokoboom), is a bushy shrub or small tree native to the coastal belt of southern and south-eastern South Africa, where it grows in coastal dune vegetation and wooded areas up to about 150 m (490 ft) above sea level.

It typically grows as a dense, bushy plant with drooping branches that can extend over 6 m (20 ft). The bark is pale yellow-brown and may develop cracks as the plant ages. In winter, it produces clusters of greenish-white flowers, developing into fruits with bright orange seeds.
