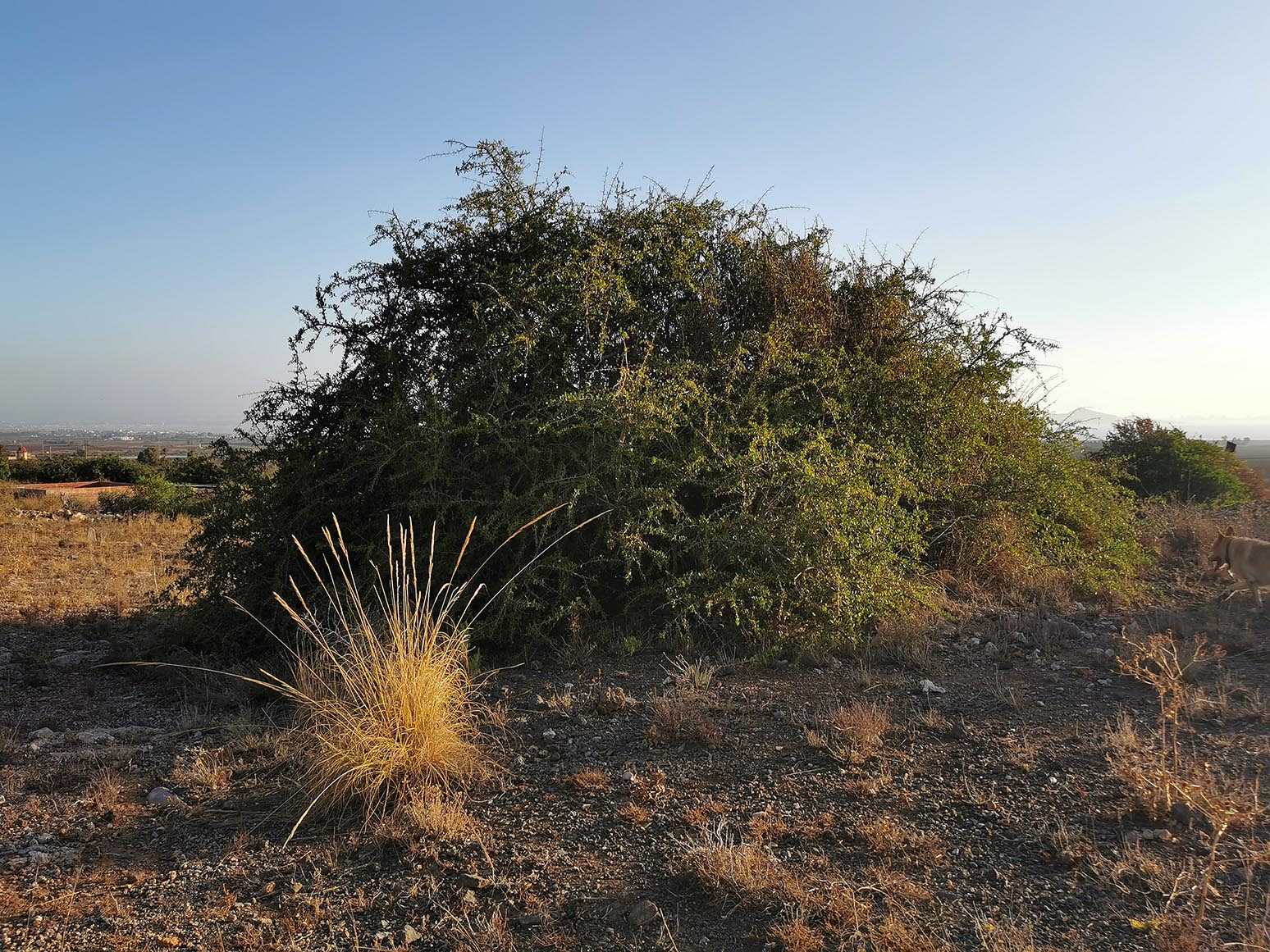
- Maytenus senegalensis in the environment of the Mar Menor, (Cartagena) (Spain).

Conservation status
- Vulnerable (IUCN 3.1)

Scientific classification
- Kingdom: Plantae
- Clade: Tracheophytes
- Clade: Angiosperms
- Clade: Eudicots
- Clade: Rosids
- Order: Celastrales
- Family: Celastraceae
- Genus: Maytenus
- Species: M. senegalensis

Binomial name
- Maytenus senegalensis Lam., Exell subsp. europaea Boiss Rivas Mart. ex Güemes & M.B. Crespo

Synonyms
- Catha europaea (Boiss.); Celastrus europaeus Boiss; Gymnosporia europaea Webb.; Gymnosporia senegalensis subsp. europaea (Boiss.) Rivas Goday and Rivas Martínez; Celastrus senegalensis Lam.

= Maytenus senegalensis =

Species of a plant

Maytenus senegalensis, also known as arto, arto negro or espino cambrón in Spanish is a thorny shrub of the Celastraceae family. Endemic to Ibero-Africa, it is an endangered species and listed as vulnerable. It contains cathinone and cathine.

In The Plant List it is considered a synonym of Gymnosporia senegalensis.

Two subspecies of Maytenus senegalensis are recognized:

- Maytenus senegalensis subsp. europaea (Spain and North Africa).
- Maytenus senegalensis subsp. senegalensis (tropical Africa and Asia).

== Morphology ==
=== Maytenus senegalensis subsp. europaea ===
It has a maximum size of about two meters. Spiny shrub with leathery leaves, short petiole, oblong or elliptic, arranged alternately or fasciculate. Actinomorphic and hermaphrodite flowers, white or greenish, 4–6 mm in diameter. Calyx of 5 sepals, welded to the base. Perianth with 5 petals. Androecium with 5 stamens, alternipetalous. Bilocular or inoculate ovary. The fruit is ellipsoidal in shape, about 5 mm, capsule, producing seeds of brown or reddish color, about 2–3 mm.

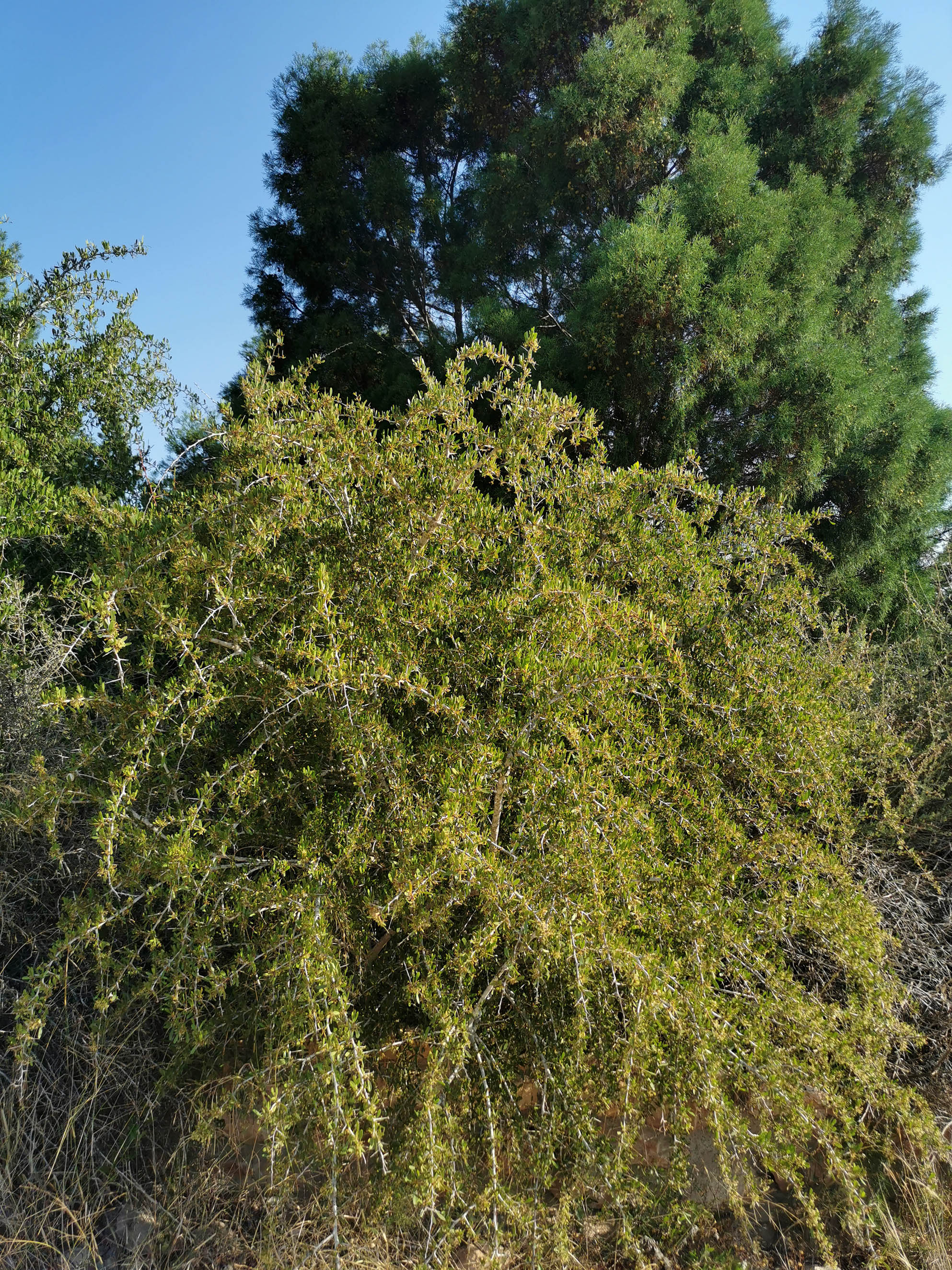
Maytenus senegalensis, general aspect of the plant. Cartagena (Spain).

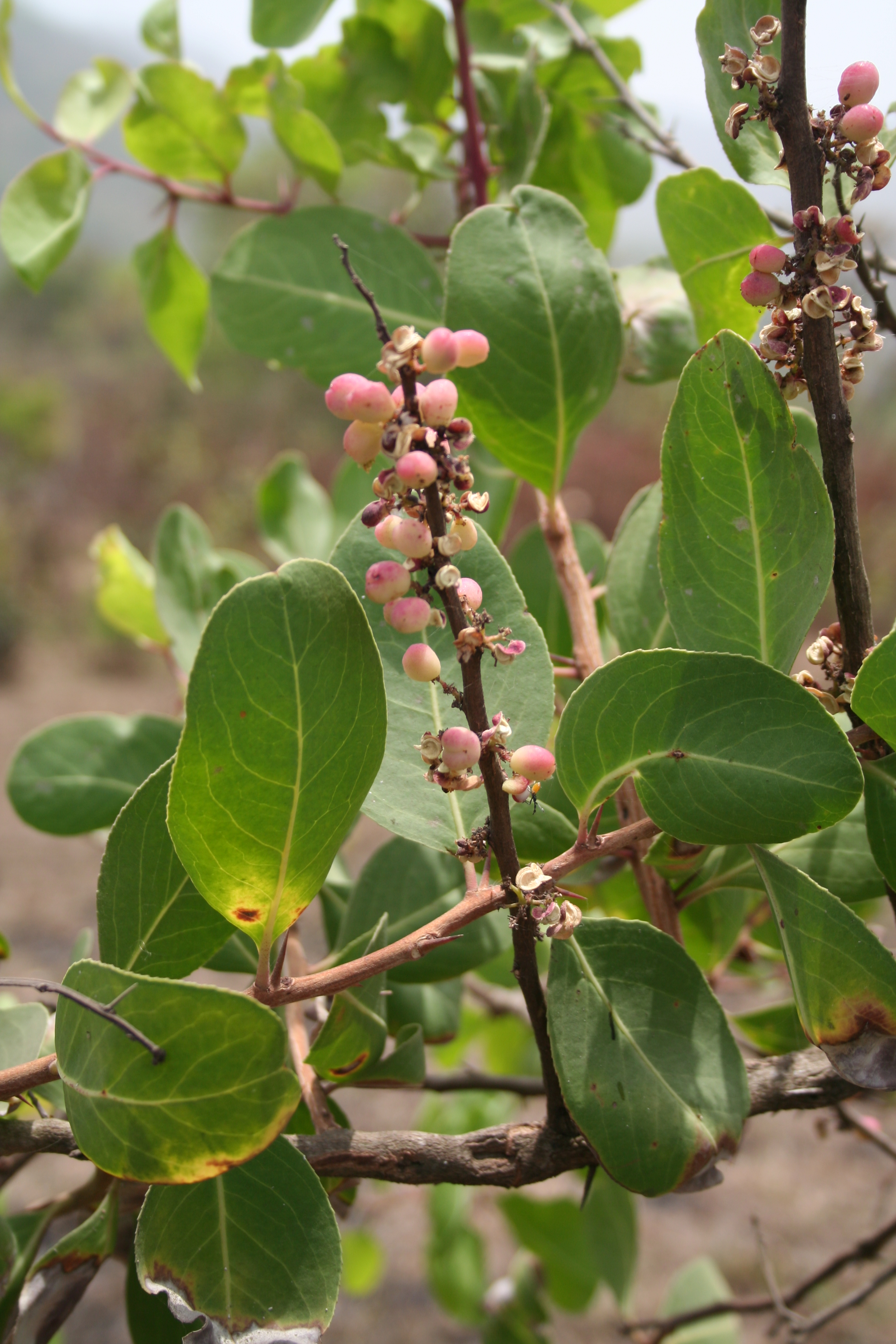
Maytenus senegalensis subsp. senegalensis in Cameroon.

=== Maytenus senegalensis subsp. senegalensis ===
It is less spiny, sometimes even inert, the capsules are trilocular and the leaves are not rounded at the apex.

== Life cycle ==
It flowers between June and October and the fruits ripen between September and October.

== Habitat ==
In Spain it grows in coastal and warm areas, up to about 400 m a.s.l., on stony soils, ravines or protected areas, where there is no frost but the marine influence is received. Areas of thorny scrub and cambronales, characteristic of the communities of Mayteno-periplocetum angustifoliae and Rhamno-Maytenetum europaei, coexists with other Ibero-African species such as Periploca angustifolia or Withania frutescens, as well as with Asparagus albus, Aristolochia baetica, Chamaerops humilis, Ephedra fragilis, Genista umbellata, Lavandula multifida, Rhamnus oleoides, Salvia rosmarinus and Thymus baeticus.

== Distribution ==
It is a very widely distributed species.

In Africa it can be found throughout the Maghreb, especially in Morocco and Algeria, and in sub-Saharan Africa, from Senegal to Eritrea, as well as in the south of the continent as far north as Namibia, Botswana and South Africa. It can also be found on the island of Madagascar. To the east, it spreads in Asia through the Arabian Peninsula, Afghanistan, Pakistan, India and Bangladesh.

The only European populations are located on the southeastern coast of Spain, from Malaga to Murcia and south of Alicante, through Granada and Almeria.

In Almería they can be found in El Palmer and La Molineta, in El Ejido (SCI El Artal), Guardias Viejas, Santa Fe de Mondújar or Cuevas del Almanzora, in protected areas such as the Natural Park of Cabo de Gata-Níjar, Sierra Alhamilla, Punta Entinas-Sabinar and La Partala; its status is locally critical.

In the Region of Murcia is located only in the Sierra Minera de Cartagena-La Union, with good populations in the vicinity of El Gorguel and in the natural park of Calblanque, Monte de las Cenizas and Peña del Aguila.

== Conservation status in Spain ==
It is threatened by coastal urbanization, which has led to its inclusion in the Red Book of threatened wild flora of Andalusia, as vulnerable. The Red List of the Vascular Flora of Andalusia lists it as endangered.

In the region of Murcia, its main populations are endangered by the El Gorguel macro-port construction project. It is listed as a vulnerable species in the Regional Catalog of Protected Wild Flora of the Region of Murcia.

At the national level, it appears in the Red List of Spanish vascular flora, as near-threatened.

== Use ==
Its wood, hard and fine-grained, is used as fuel because it provides good firewood and charcoal. Its leaves are used as an aphrodisiac and central nervous system stimulant.

== Properties ==
Cathinone and cathine are central nervous system stimulants, substances related to amphetamines.

== Taxonomy ==
Maytenus senegalensis was described by Lam, Exell and published in Boletim da Sociedade Broteriana, ser. 2 26: 223. 1952.

=== Etymology ===
- Maytenus: generic name from maiten, mayten or mayton, an Araucanian name for the type species Maytenus boaria.
- senegalensis: geographical epithet of Senegal (Latin genitive), a West African country, although some senegalenis is also found as native to Spain.

== Bibliography ==
- Various authors (1999). Libro Rojo de la Flora Silvestre Amenazada de Andalucía. Tomo II: Especies Vulnerables (in Spanish) (Consejería de Medio Ambiente ed.). Junta de Andalucía, Dep. Legal SE-1325-2000. pp. 235–237. ISBN 84-89650-78-0.
