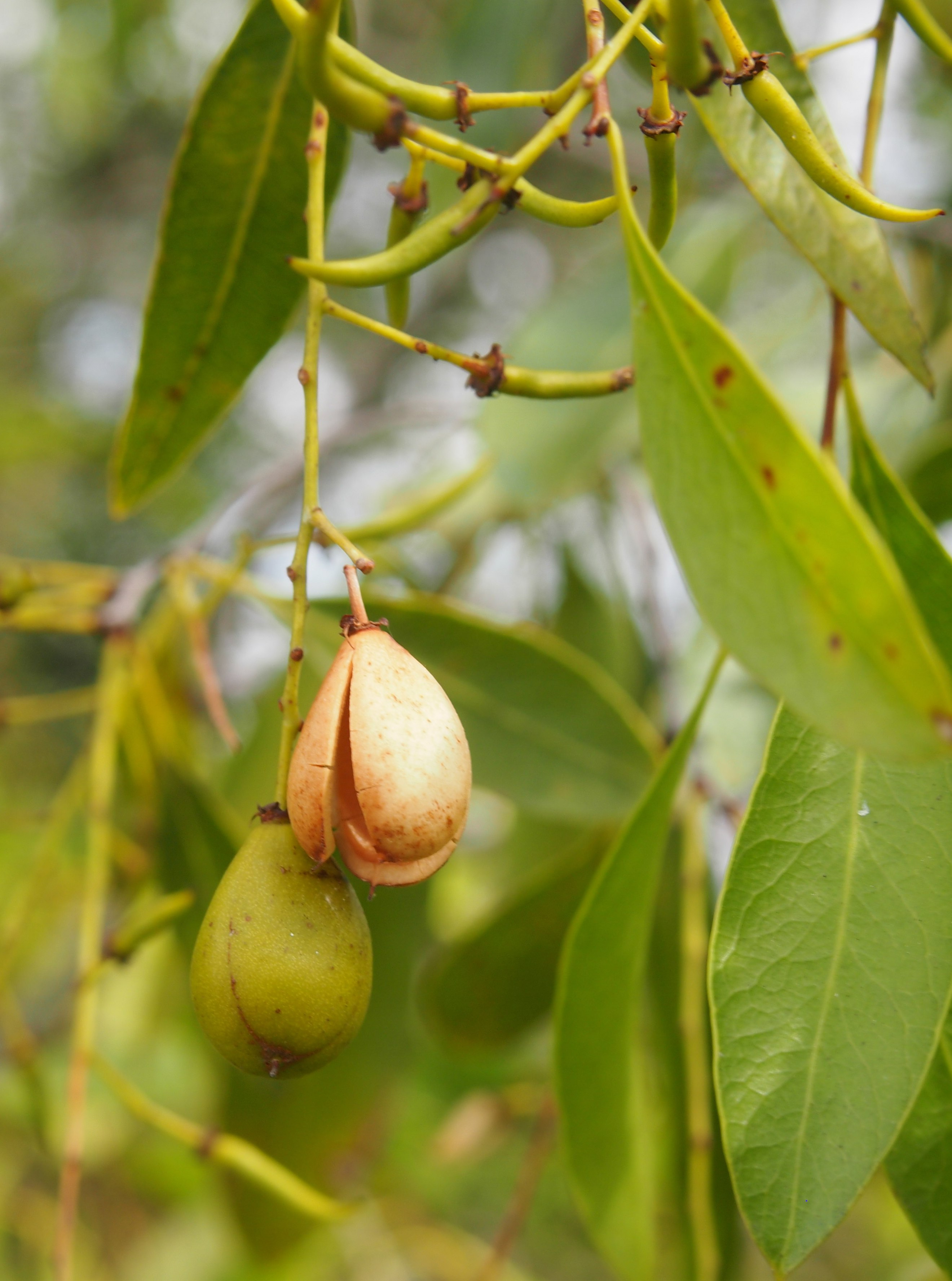
- Denhamia oleaster

Scientific classification
- Kingdom: Plantae
- Clade: Tracheophytes
- Clade: Angiosperms
- Clade: Eudicots
- Clade: Rosids
- Order: Celastrales
- Family: Celastraceae
- Genus: Denhamia; Meisn. (1837)

Synonyms
- Leucocarpum A.Rich. (1834)

= Denhamia =

Genus of flowering plants

Denhamia is a genus of plants within the family Celastraceae, with species in Australia, New Guinea, and New Caledonia. The species inhabit a variety of environments, from rainforest to semi-arid savanna. All species grow as shrubs or small trees up to 10 metres in height. 18 species are currently accepted. Based on a molecular and morphological analysis, the genus was enlarged in 2011 to include several Australian and Pacific island species formerly classified as Maytenus – Denhamia bilocularis, D. cunninghamii, D. cupularis, D. disperma, D. fasciculiflora, D. ferdinandii, D.fournieri, and D. silvestris.

== Species ==
18 species are accepted.

- Denhamia bilocularis (F.Muell.) M.P.Simmons
- Denhamia celastroides (F.Muell.) Jessup
- Denhamia cunninghamii (Hook.) M.P.Simmons
- Denhamia cupularis (Ding Hou) M.P.Simmons
- Denhamia disperma (F.Muell.) M.P.Simmons
- Denhamia fasciculiflora (Jessup) M.P.Simmons
- Denhamia fournieri (Pancher & Sebert) M.P.Simmons
- Denhamia megacarpa J.J.Halford & Jessup
- Denhamia moorei Jessup
- Denhamia muelleri (Benth.) Jessup
- Denhamia obscura (A.Rich.) Meisn. ex Walp.
- Denhamia oleaster (Lindl.) F.Muell.
- Denhamia parvifolia L.S.Sm.
- Denhamia peninsularis J.J.Halford & Jessup
- Denhamia pittosporoides F.Muell.
  - Denhamia pittosporoides subsp. pittosporoides
  - Denhamia pittosporoides subsp. angustifolia
- Denhamia silvestris (Lander & L.A.S.Johnson) M.P.Simmons
- Denhamia trichoclada J.J.Halford
- Denhamia viridissima F.M.Bailey & F.Muell.
