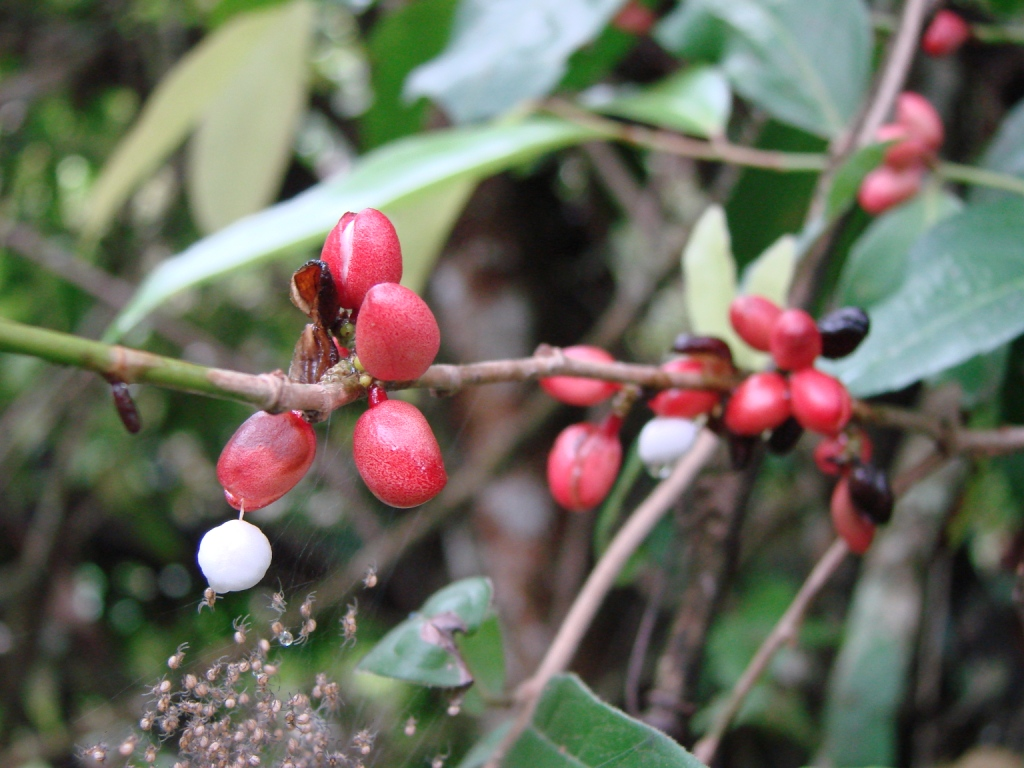

Scientific classification
- Kingdom: Plantae
- Clade: Tracheophytes
- Clade: Angiosperms
- Clade: Eudicots
- Clade: Rosids
- Order: Celastrales
- Family: Celastraceae
- Genus: Maytenus
- Species: M. gonoclados

Binomial name
- Maytenus gonoclados Mart. (1841)

Synonyms
- Maytenus lagoensis Warm. (1880); Maytenus robusta Reissek (1861); Monteverdia gonoclados (Mart.) Biral (2017); Monteverdia robusta (Reissek) Biral (2017)

= Maytenus gonoclados =

Species of flowering plant

Maytenus gonoclados, known in Brazil as cafezinho do mato or coração de bugre, is a species of plant in the family Celastraceae. It is endemic to Brazil.

Maytenus gonoclados is used in folk medicine to treat gastric ulcers.
