= Denhamia parvifolia =

Conservation status
- Vulnerable (EPBC Act)

Scientific classification
- Kingdom: Plantae
- Clade: Embryophytes
- Clade: Tracheophytes
- Clade: Spermatophytes
- Clade: Angiosperms
- Clade: Eudicots
- Clade: Rosids
- Order: Celastrales
- Family: Celastraceae
- Genus: Denhamia
- Species: D. parvifolia

Binomial name
- Denhamia parvifolia L.S.Sm.

Species of shrub

Denhamia parvifolia, commonly known as the small-leaved denhamia, is a species of small shrub which is endemic to South-East Queensland, Australia

== Distribution and Habitat ==
Denhamia parvifolia occurs on labile to sub-laible sandstone, siltstone, shales, and alkaline and acidic volcanic igneous regolith. It has been observed growing on red-brown sandy to clay loams on undulating hill slopes at elevations of 160-560m above sea level. It is restricted to semi-evergreen vine thickets and Acacia harpophylla (Brigalow) communities. Its range distribution occurs from Eidsvold in the North, south to Chinchilla and east to Kingaroy. The Acacia harpophylla and semi-evergreen vine thickets in the north and south Brigalow Belt and Nandewar bioregions are classified as endangered vegetation communities under the Environment Protection and Biodiversity Conservation Act 1999.

== In-situ Conservation ==
Remnants of this species can be seen in-situ at Kingaroy Heights Park and Environmental Park frequently occurring along-side the Kingaroy population of endangered Phebalium distans (Mount Berryman Phebalium) in semi-evergreen vine thicket. The park is managed by the non-profit organisation Native Plants Queensland which advocate for conservation.

== Conservation status ==
Denhamia parvifolia is classified as "vulnerable" under the Australian Government Environment Protection and Biodiversity Conservation Act 1999 and as "vulnerable" under the Queensland Government Nature Conservation Act 1992.
