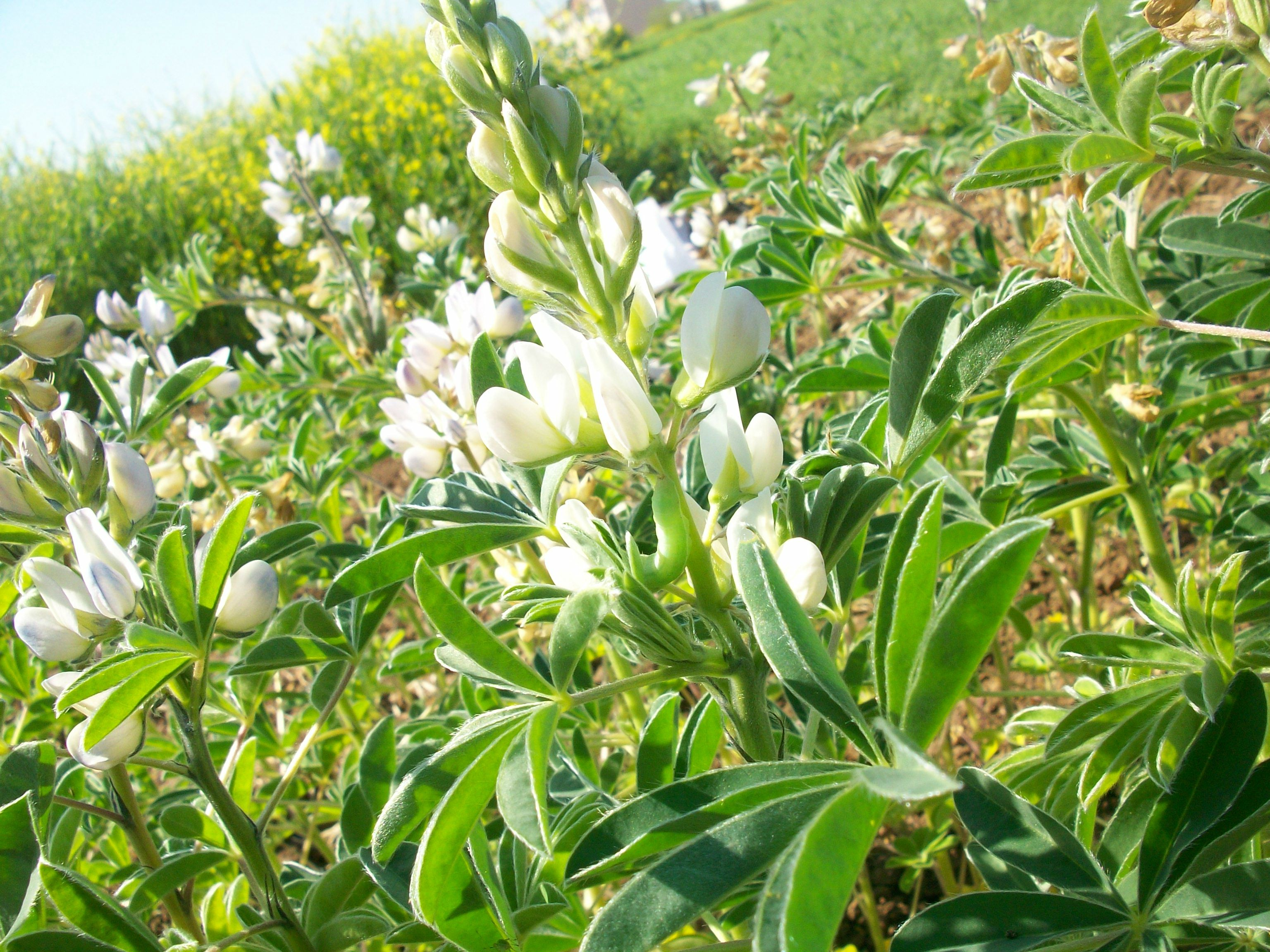

Scientific classification
- Kingdom: Plantae
- Clade: Tracheophytes
- Clade: Angiosperms
- Clade: Eudicots
- Clade: Asterids
- Order: Lamiales
- Family: Lamiaceae
- Genus: Thymus
- Species: T. baeticus

Binomial name
- Thymus baeticus Boiss. ex Lacaita

Synonyms
- Thymus zygis var. baeticus (Boiss. ex Lacaita); Thymus baeticus var. capitatus (Boiss.); Thymus erianthus (Boiss.) Pau ex Ceballos & Vicioso; Thymus hirtus var. capitatus Boiss.; Thymus hirtus var. erianthus Boiss.; Thymus hirtus var. intermedius Boiss.; Thymus zygis var. capitatus (Boiss.)

= Thymus baeticus =

Species of a flowering plants

Thymus baeticus is a species of plants in the Lamiaceae family.

== Description ==
Thymus baeticus has suffrutice stems that are 15–50 cm (5.9–19.7 in) in height, usually erect and pubescent. It has leaves that are 4–7 mm (0.16–0.28 in) long and 0.6–2 mm (0.024–0.079 in) wide that are linear or linear-lanceolate, revolute, ciliate at base, and densely hairy with short retrorse hairs. Its inflorescences are dense and capituliform. It has elliptic, ciliate bracts that are 4–6 mm (0.16–0.24 in) long and 1.3–2.5 mm (0.051–0.098 in) wide. The calyx are 3–3.5 mm (0.12–0.14 in), densely hairy, with short tube and ciliate upper teeth. The corolla are cream or white.

It has a chromosome number of 2n = 58, 60.

It flowers from May to June.

== Distribution and habitat ==
It is found in thickets, on limestone, crystalline dolomites, dolomitic sands, stony soils and gypsum, sometimes also on sandstone, slate or shale; at an altitude of 30–1,300 m (98–4,265 ft) in southern Spain, where it is distributed along the coast of Cádiz and Grazalema.

== Taxonomy ==
Thymus baeticus was described by Boiss. ex Lacaita and published in Cavanillesia 3: 42 (1930).

=== Etymology ===
The geographical epithet baeticus alludes to its location in Baetica.
