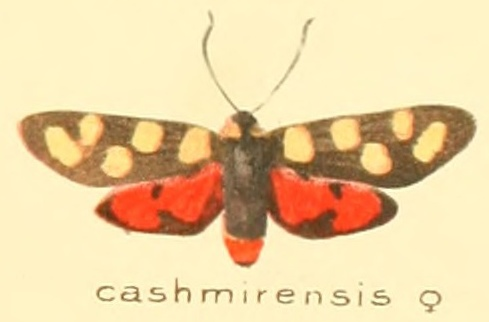
- Female
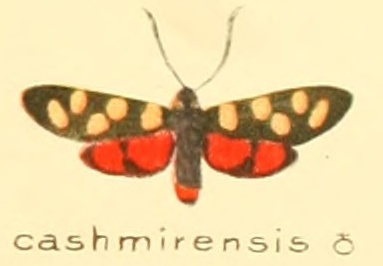
- Male

Scientific classification
- Domain: Eukaryota
- Kingdom: Animalia
- Phylum: Arthropoda
- Class: Insecta
- Order: Lepidoptera
- Family: Zygaenidae
- Genus: Praezygaena
- Species: P. caschmirensis

Binomial name
- Praezygaena caschmirensis (Kollar, 1844)

Synonyms
- Zygaena caschmirensis Kollar, 1844; Praezygaena (Epizygaenella) caschmirensis; Zygaena asoka Moore, 1879; Praezygaena asoka

= Praezygaena caschmirensis =

Species of moth

Praezygaena caschmirensis is a species of moth in the family Zygaenidae. It is found from Afghanistan to Nepal.
