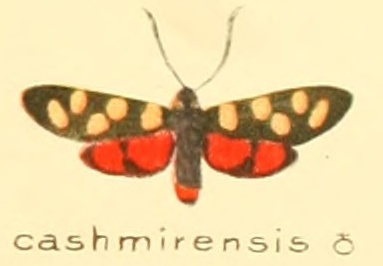
- cashmirensis

Scientific classification
- Domain: Eukaryota
- Kingdom: Animalia
- Phylum: Arthropoda
- Class: Insecta
- Order: Lepidoptera
- Family: Zygaenidae
- Subfamily: Zygaeninae
- Genus: Praezygaena; Alberti, 1954

= Praezygaena =

Genus of moths

Praezygaena is a genus of moths in the family Zygaenidae. The genus was established as a subgenus of Epizygaena.

== Selected species ==
- Praezygaena agria (Distant, 1892)
- Praezygaena caschmirensis (Kollar, 1844)
- Praezygaena conjuncta (Hampson, 1920)
- Praezygaena lateralis (Jordan, 1907)
- Praezygaena microsticha (Jordan, 1907)
- Praezygaena myodes (Druce, 1899)
- Praezygaena ochroptera (Felder, 1874)
