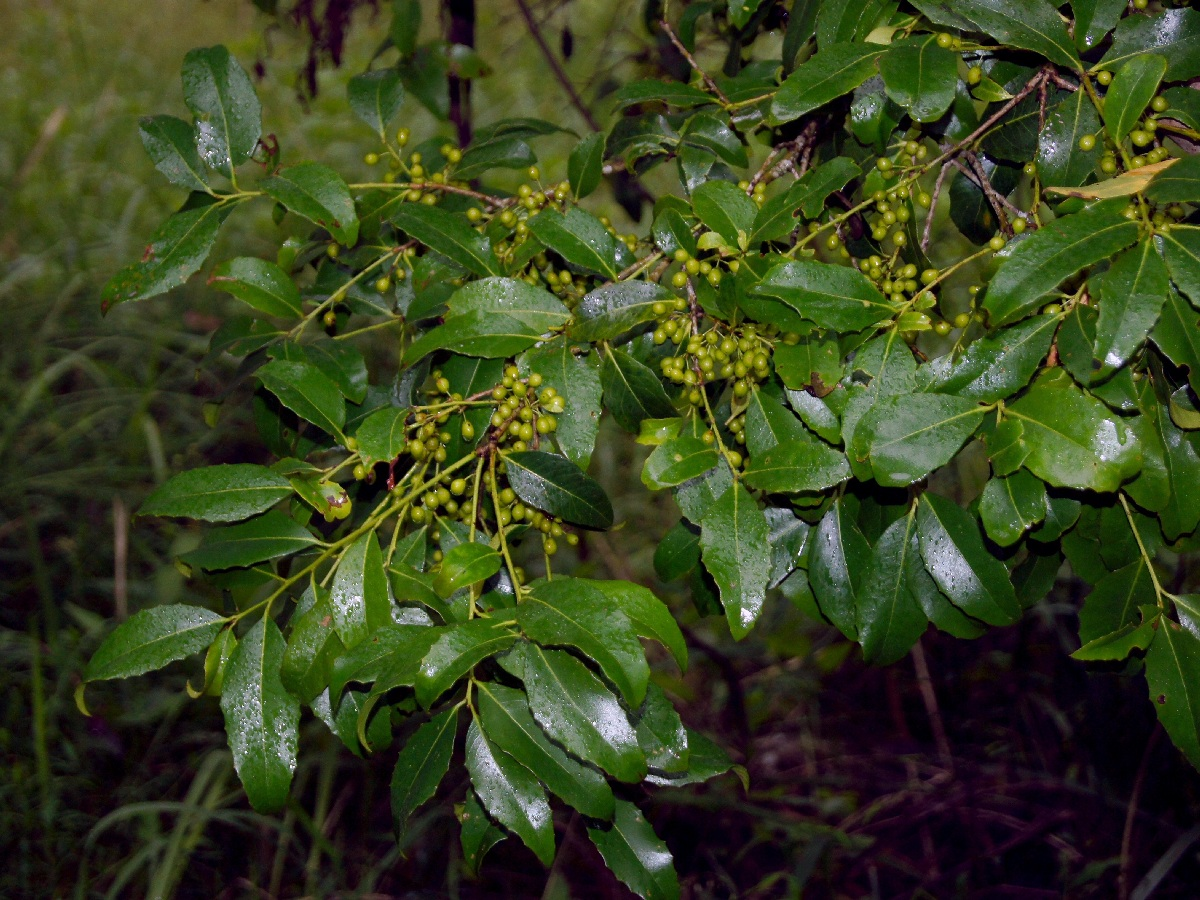

Scientific classification
- Kingdom: Plantae
- Clade: Tracheophytes
- Clade: Angiosperms
- Clade: Eudicots
- Clade: Rosids
- Order: Celastrales
- Family: Celastraceae
- Genus: Denhamia
- Species: D. bilocularis

Binomial name
- Denhamia bilocularis (F.Muell.) M.P.Simmons (2011)

Synonyms
- Celastrus bilocularis F.Muell. (1859); Maytenus bilocularis (F.Muell.) Loes. (1942)

= Denhamia bilocularis =

Species of tree

Denhamia bilocularis, commonly known as orangebark, is a tree that is endemic to eastern Australia. It grows to 10 metres high and has leaves with toothed edges that are 3 to 9 cm long and 1.3 to 3 cm wide and elliptic, ovate or obovate in shape.

The flowers, in short racemes or clusters, appear between September and December in the species' native range.

The species was formally described in 1859 by Victorian Government Botanist Ferdinand von Mueller, who gave it the name Celastrus bilocularis. The species was transferred to the genus Maytenus in 1942, and to genus Denhamia in 2011.

The species occurs in dry rainforest and eucalypt forest in a discrete population near Atherton, Queensland as well from Biloela, Queensland southwards to Dorrigo, New South Wales.
