= Maytenus jefeana =

Conservation status
- Vulnerable (IUCN 3.1)

Scientific classification
- Kingdom: Plantae
- Clade: Tracheophytes
- Clade: Angiosperms
- Clade: Eudicots
- Clade: Rosids
- Order: Celastrales
- Family: Celastraceae
- Genus: Maytenus
- Species: M. jefeana

Binomial name
- Maytenus jefeana Lundell

Synonyms
- Monteverdia jefeana (Lundell) Biral

Species of tree

Maytenus jefeana is a species of flowering plant in the family Celastraceae. It is endemic to Panama. It is threatened by habitat loss.
