= Maytenus abbottii =

Conservation status
- Vulnerable (IUCN 2.3)

Scientific classification
- Kingdom: Plantae
- Clade: Embryophytes
- Clade: Tracheophytes
- Clade: Spermatophytes
- Clade: Angiosperms
- Clade: Eudicots
- Clade: Rosids
- Order: Celastrales
- Family: Celastraceae
- Genus: Maytenus
- Species: M. abbottii

Binomial name
- Maytenus abbottii A.E.van Wyk

Species of flowering plant

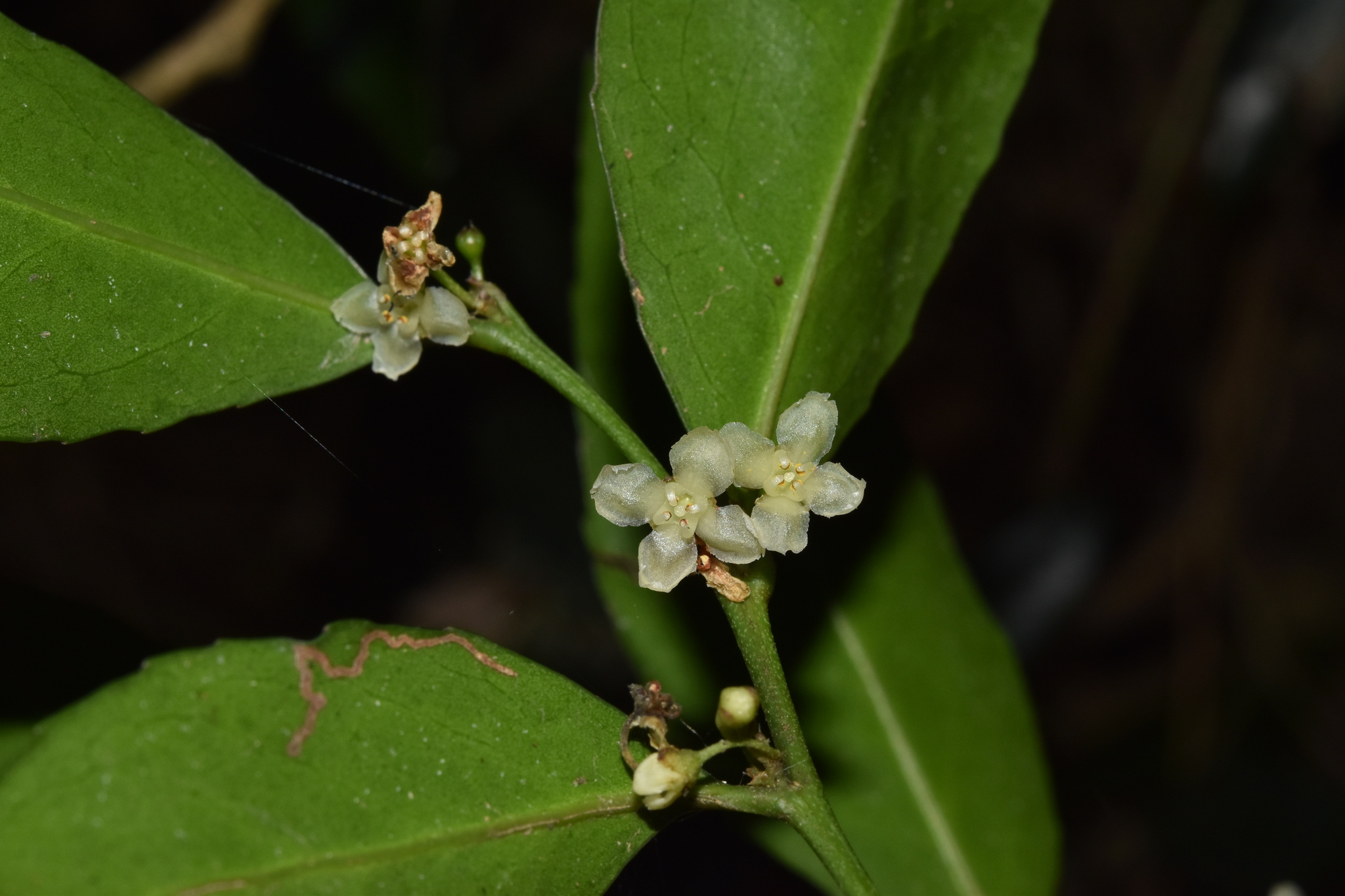
Pondo Silkybark (Maytenus abbottii) in South Africa

Maytenus abbottii is a species of plant in the family Celastraceae. It is endemic to South Africa. It is threatened by habitat loss.

This is a small gregarious tree favouring moist places such as stream banks in coastal lowland forest. There is a small population on the KwaZulu-Natal/Eastern Cape border.
