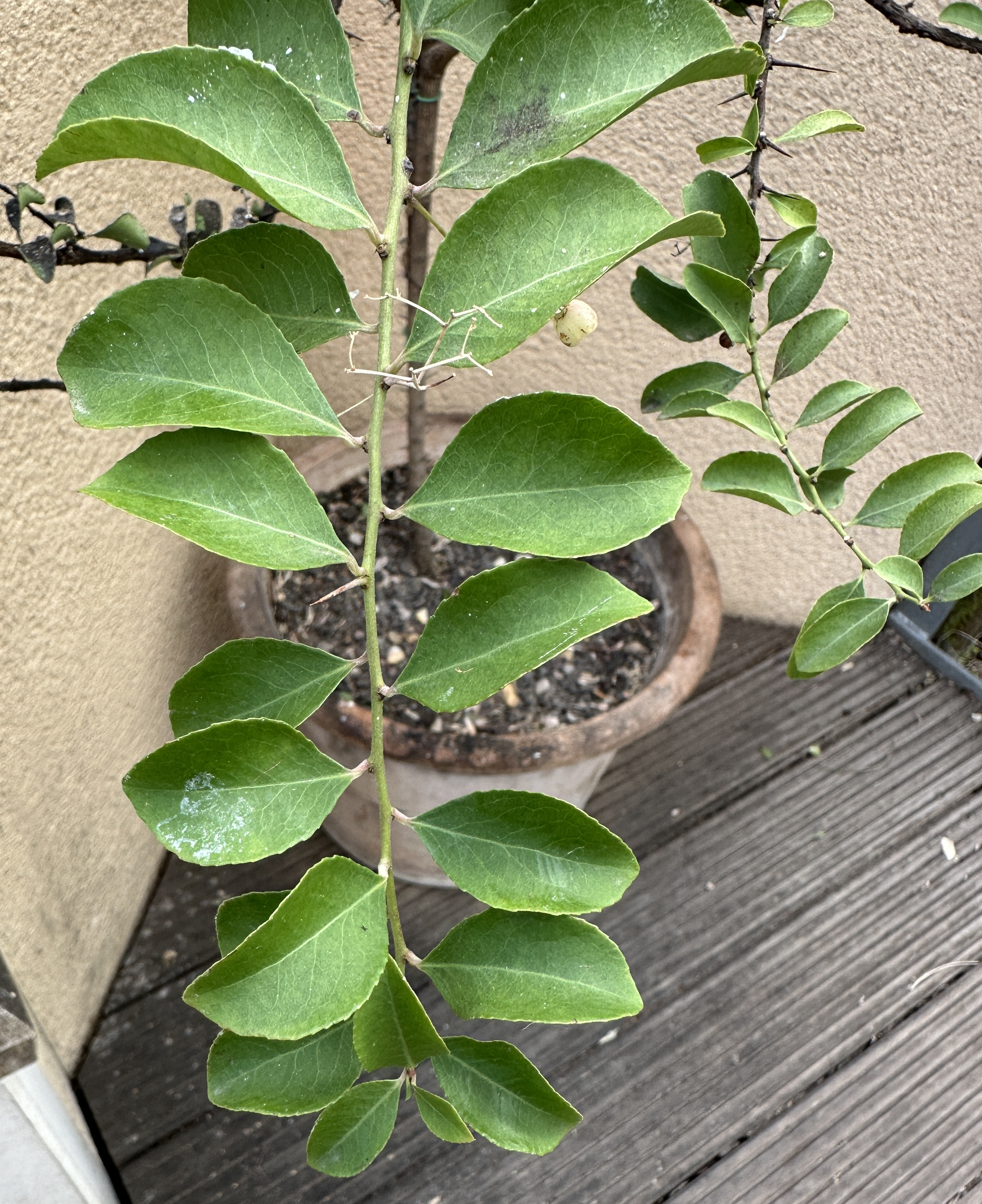

Conservation status
- Near Threatened (IUCN 2.3)

Scientific classification
- Kingdom: Plantae
- Clade: Tracheophytes
- Clade: Angiosperms
- Clade: Eudicots
- Clade: Rosids
- Order: Celastrales
- Family: Celastraceae
- Genus: Gymnosporia
- Species: G. dhofarensis

Binomial name
- Gymnosporia dhofarensis (Sebsebe) Jordaan (2006)

Synonyms
- Maytenus dhofarensis Sebsebe (1985)

= Gymnosporia dhofarensis =

Species of shrub

Gymnosporia dhofarensis is a species of plant in the family Celastraceae and is found in Oman and Yemen. It is an intricately branched spiny shrub or small tree with its leaves arranged alternately or clustered on short shoots. The flowers have white or cream petals and the fruit are purple or red. It is threatened by habitat loss.

== Description ==
Gymnosporia dhofarensis is a spiny shrub or small tree often forming more or less impenetrable thickets and growing throughout the escarpment woodlands and extending into the drier summit plateaux areas. Gymnosporia dhofarensis may be mistaken for G. senegalensis and the two species are not differentiated in local expertise.

== Taxonomy and naming ==
The species was first formally described as Maytenus dhofarensis in 1985 by Sebsebe Demissew and the description was published in Symbolae Botanicae Upsalienses. The specific epithet (dhofarensis) refers to Dhofar where this species is found.

== Distribution and habitat ==
This species is endemic to the Dhofar region of Oman and Yemen. These shrubs grow widely throughout Dhofar in drier areas as well as in monsoon areas.

== Uses and cultivation ==
Cut branches were traditionally popular as building material for pens and enclosures, for perimeter fences around the settlement compounds, for building partitions or to make a dense barrier across a cave mouth, or the 'door' due to the vicious thorns that were considered to cause more pain and difficulty of extraction.

Gymnosporia dhofarensis provides adequate firewood, however unpleasant thorns make it difficult to handle. If well known hardwood trees were absent, the wood of a well developed maytenus specimen would be used to make such vital weapons as a double-ended throwing stick and a knobbed club.

Camels browse on the foliage but cattle are unenthusiastic. Goats eat the leaves and especially the flowers of G. dhofarensis, however the fruit is poisonous and can cause the goat to fall ill with shivering attacks and develop a raised temperature.

== Wider uses ==
Many species of Gymnosporia and Maytenus are important in traditional medicine, and another species in the Celastraceae, Catha edulis, grown in the mountains of south-west Arabia and Ethiopia is the sources of Qat. In Yemen, the leaves of Maytenus species are used to make a tisane which is drunk to relieve pains in the stomach; the roots of Gymnosporia senegalensis are chipped into shavings and added to beer to be drunk as an aphrodisiac in parts of Africa. Researchers have also been able to isolate the active compound maytanisne from G. buchananii, which is on trial as a possible chemotherapeutic drug against cancer.
