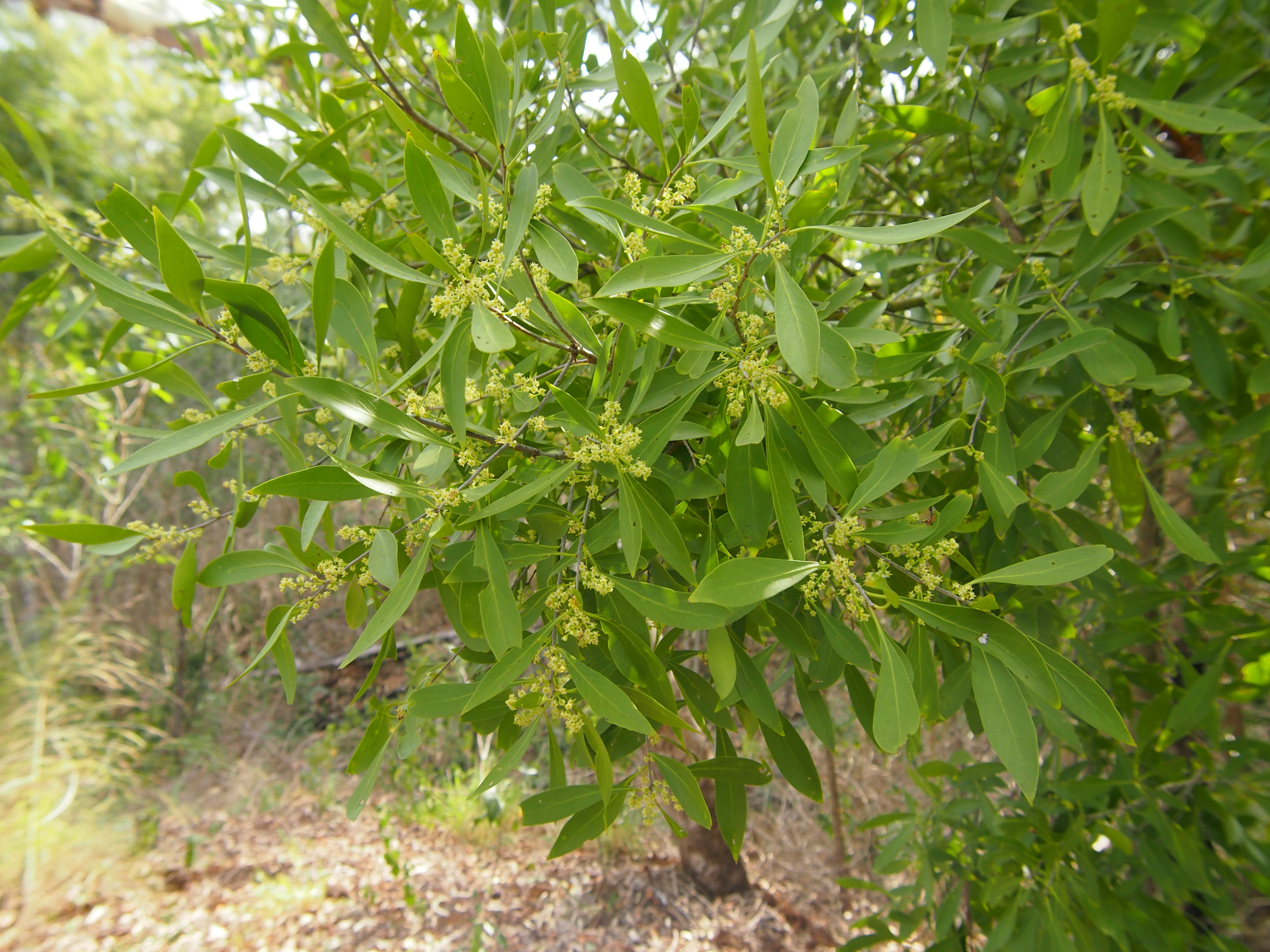

Scientific classification
- Kingdom: Plantae
- Clade: Tracheophytes
- Clade: Angiosperms
- Clade: Eudicots
- Clade: Rosids
- Order: Celastrales
- Family: Celastraceae
- Genus: Denhamia
- Species: D. disperma

Binomial name
- Denhamia disperma F.Muell. M.P.Simmons (2011)

Synonyms
- Celastrus dispermus F.Muell. (1859); Maytenus disperma (F.Muell.) Loes. (1942)

= Denhamia disperma =

Species of tree

Denhamia disperma, sometimes referred to as the orange boxwood, is a shrub or small tree growing in eastern Australia, from Queensland to northeastern New South Wales. Often seen in and near dry rainforests.
