= Maytenus chubutensis =

Scientific classification
- Kingdom: Plantae
- Clade: Tracheophytes
- Clade: Angiosperms
- Clade: Eudicots
- Clade: Rosids
- Order: Celastrales
- Family: Celastraceae
- Genus: Maytenus
- Species: M. chubutensis

Binomial name
- Maytenus chubutensis (Speg.) Lourteig, O'Donell & Sleumer

Species of plant

Maytenus chubutensis is a species of flowering plant in the family Celastraceae. It is a shrub native to Chile and Argentina. In Chile, it is distributed from the Maule to the Aysen regions.
