= Lacaita =

Lacaita is a surname. Notable people with the surname include:

- Charles Lacaita (1853–1933), British botanist and politician
- James Lacaita (1813–1895), British politician and writer
