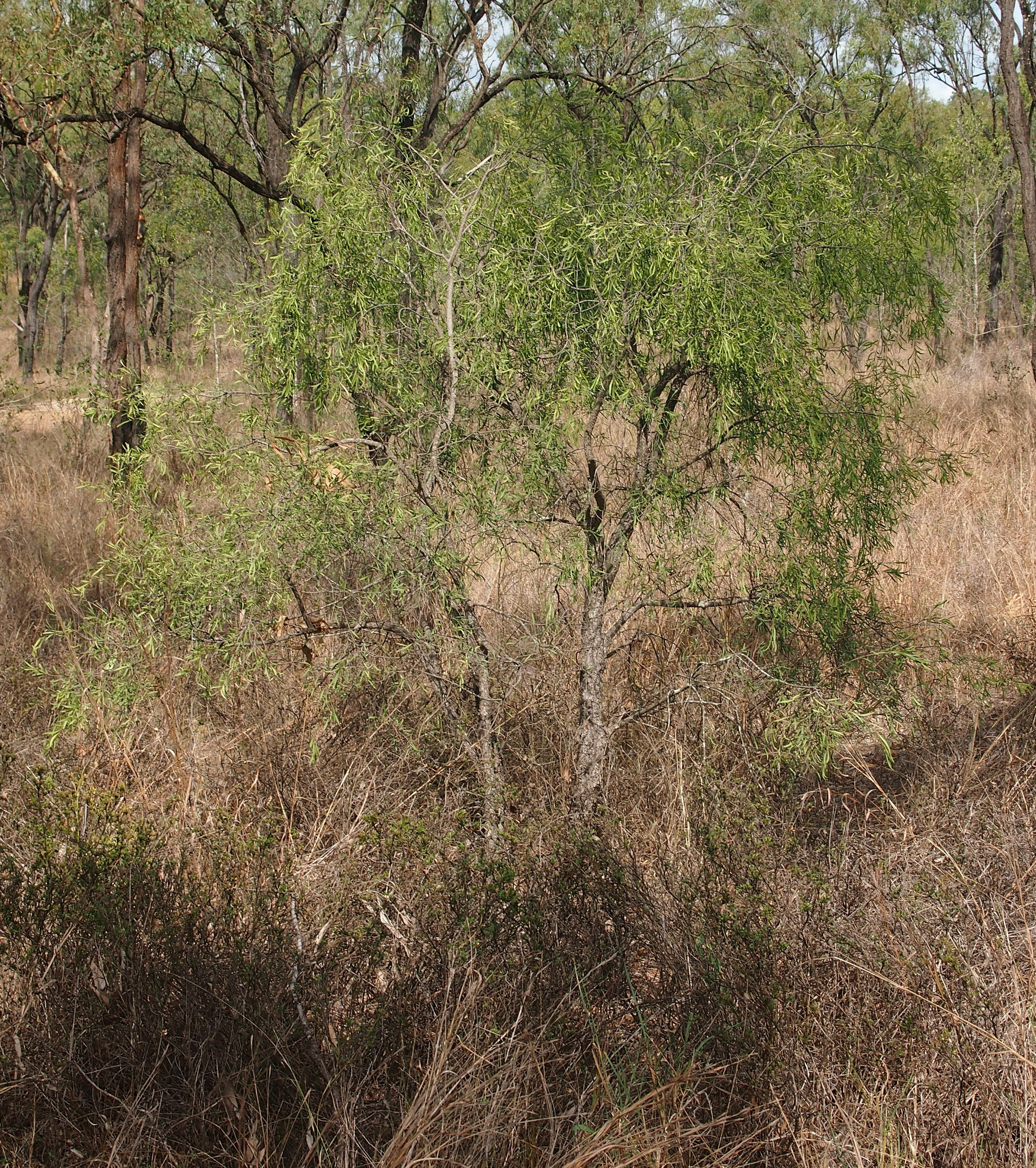

Scientific classification
- Kingdom: Plantae
- Clade: Tracheophytes
- Clade: Angiosperms
- Clade: Eudicots
- Clade: Rosids
- Order: Celastrales
- Family: Celastraceae
- Genus: Denhamia
- Species: D. cunninghamii

Binomial name
- Denhamia cunninghamii (Hook.) M.P.Simmons (2011)

Synonyms
- Catha cunninghamii Hook. (1848); Celastrus baileyanus Domin (1927); Celastrus cunninghamii (Hook.) F.Muell. (1859); Maytenus cunninghamii (Hook.) Loes. (1942)

= Denhamia cunninghamii =

Species of shrub

Denhamia cunninghamii is a species of shrub endemic to Australia. The natural range extends from The Kimberley and throughout The Northern Territory and Queensland. The plant grows to 6 metres in height, though it commonly flowers as a much smaller shrub. It is most commonly found in savanna and open forests, though it occasionally extends into monsoon forest.

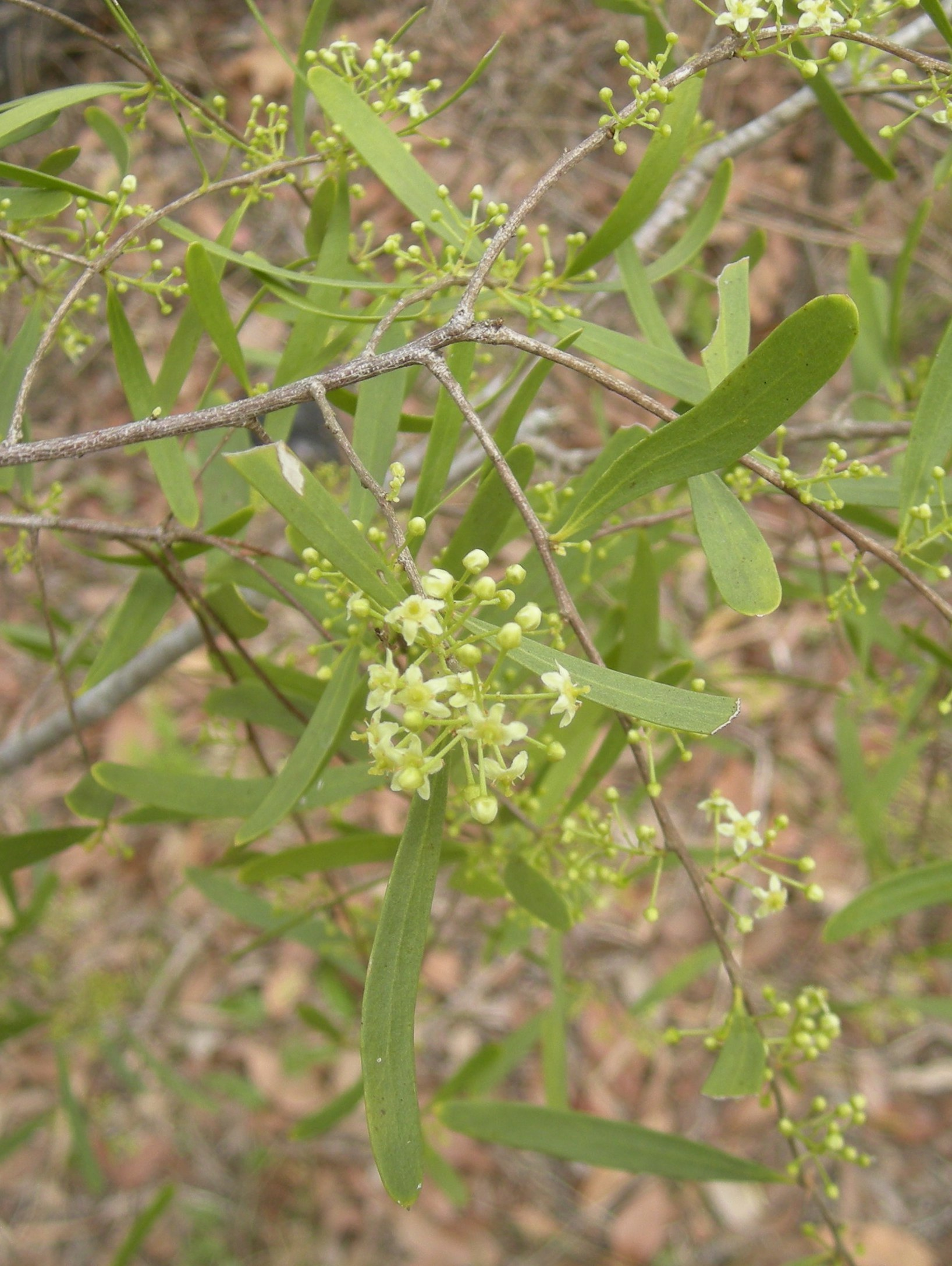
Flowers and foliage of D. cunninghamii.
