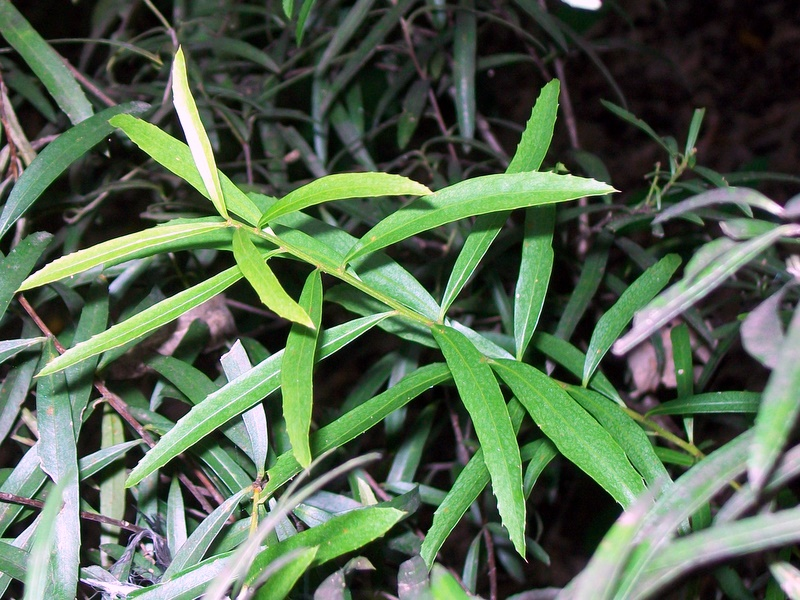
- At Eastwood, NSW

Scientific classification
- Kingdom: Plantae
- Clade: Tracheophytes
- Clade: Angiosperms
- Clade: Eudicots
- Clade: Rosids
- Order: Celastrales
- Family: Celastraceae
- Genus: Denhamia
- Species: D. silvestris

Binomial name
- Denhamia silvestris (Lander & L.A.S.Johnson) M.P.Simmons (2011)

Synonyms
- Maytenus silvestris Lander & L.A.S.Johnson (1973)

= Denhamia silvestris =

Species of tree

Denhamia silvestris is a shrub or small tree growing from Picton, New South Wales (34° S) to Kroombit Tops, near Gladstone, Queensland (23° S). It occurs in dry rainforest, eucalyptus and rainforest ecotone areas. Common names include narrow leaved orangebark, orange bush and orange bark.

== Description ==
Commonly seen as a densely dark green shrub two metres tall, though it can occasionally attain heights of 10 to 15 m (33 to 49 ft) with a trunk diameter of 25 cm (9.8 in). The trunk is crooked and misshapen but without buttresses. Outer bark is greyish brown or grey, fairly smooth but with lenticels. The other part of live bark is green, brown and reddish. The exposed bark gives the common name "orange bark".

Leaves are 10 to 80 mm (0.39 to 3.15 in) long, 2 to 13 mm (0.08 to 0.51 in) wide, narrow lanceolate to ovate in shape. Leaf edges are curved over, sometimes with toothed edges, other times entire. The leaf tip is sometimes curved. The leaf base slowly tapers away with a thin beginning of the leaf. Leaf stalks are 2 to 5 mm (0.08 to 0.20 in) long. Leaf venation is evident on both sides, with five to eight pairs of lateral veins. Leaflets are lenticellate, slender and smooth, and dark reddish brown or grey. New shoots are downy.

=== Flowers & fruit ===
Pale green flowers form on racemes from the leaf axils, either singly, or in twos or threes. Flowering usually occurs from October to January, though sometimes as late as April. The fruit is an orange capsule, roundish in shape, and 3 to 7 mm (0.12 to 0.28 in) in diameter. The capsule splits in two, with one to four glossy brown seeds, enclosed in an orange fleshy aril. Seeds are egg shaped, 4 to 5 mm (0.16 to 0.20 in) long. Fruit matures from February to May. Seed germination is quite reliable, with germination complete after 42 days.
