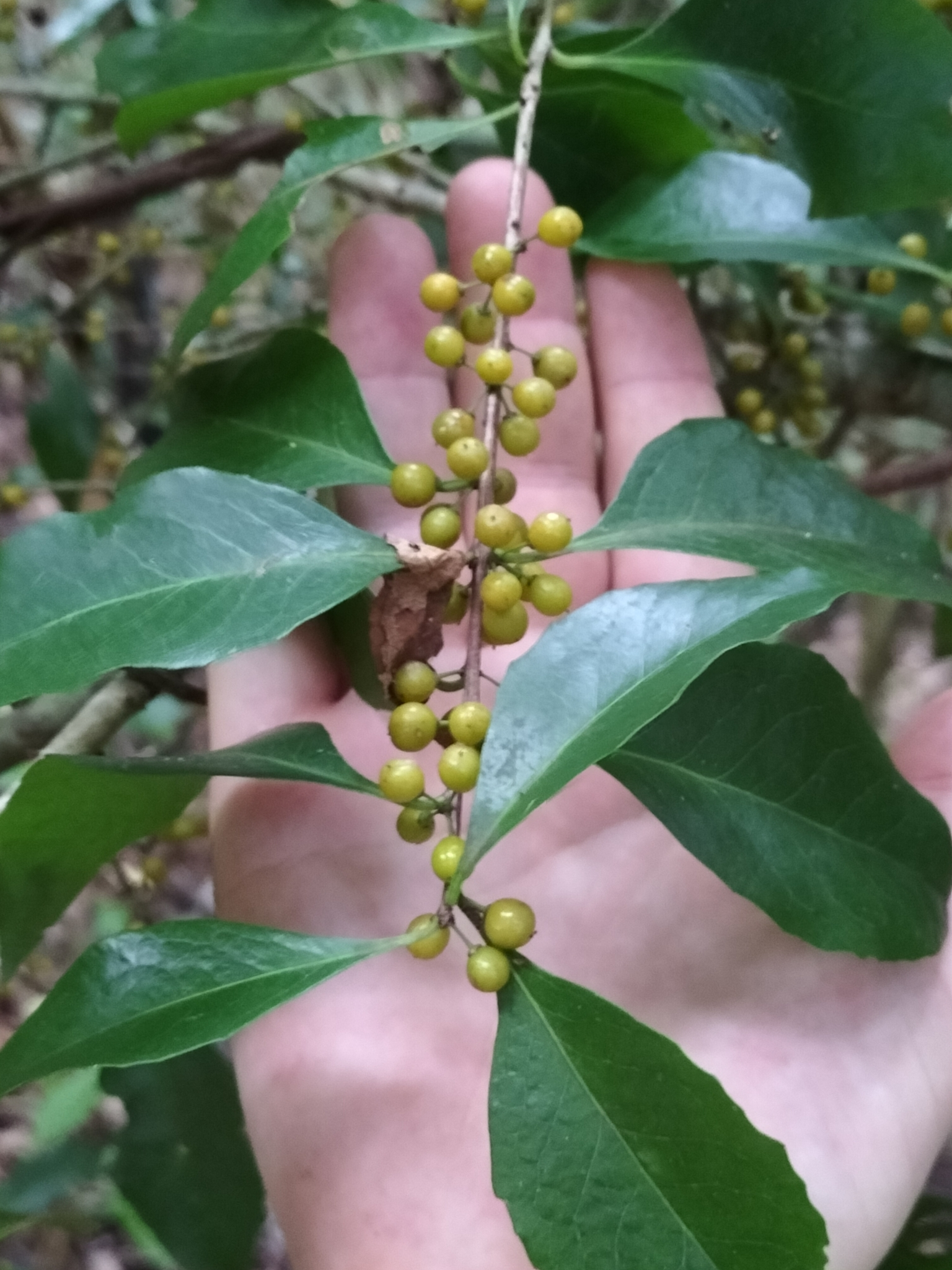
- Immature fruit

Scientific classification
- Kingdom: Plantae
- Clade: Tracheophytes
- Clade: Angiosperms
- Clade: Eudicots
- Clade: Rosids
- Order: Celastrales
- Family: Celastraceae
- Genus: Denhamia
- Species: D. fasciculiflora

Binomial name
- Denhamia fasciculiflora (Jessup) M.P.Simmons

Synonyms
- Maytenus fasciculiflora Jessup

= Denhamia fasciculiflora =

Orange bark

Species of flowering plant

Denhamia fasciculiflora, commonly known as orange bark, is a plant in the family Celastraceae found only in Queensland, Australia.

== Description ==
It is a shrub or small tree up to 8 m (26 ft) tall. The leaves are broadly elliptic and often arranged in pseudowhorls. They measure up to 10 cm (3.9 in) long and 5 cm (2.0 in) wide and have bluntly toothed edges. Flowers arise from the twigs or leaf axils in short fascicles, and are very small with four or five 2 mm (0.08 in) long petals. The fruit is an almost spherical capsule about 7 mm (0.28 in) diameter, containing one or two aril-covered seeds.

== Taxonomy ==
The plant was first described in 1984 by Australian botanist Laurence Woodward Jessup as Maytenus fasciculiflora, and published in an appendix to volume 22 of the book series Flora of Australia. In 2011, American botanist Mark P. Simmons published a paper in which the Australian species of Maytenus were transferred to Denhamia, giving this plant its current binomial name.

== Distribution and habitat ==
The species is found in northeastern Queensland, from Cape York Peninsula to the Atherton Tablelands.

== Conservation ==
As of November 2024, this species has been assessed to be of least concern by the International Union for Conservation of Nature (IUCN) and by the Queensland Government under its Nature Conservation Act.
