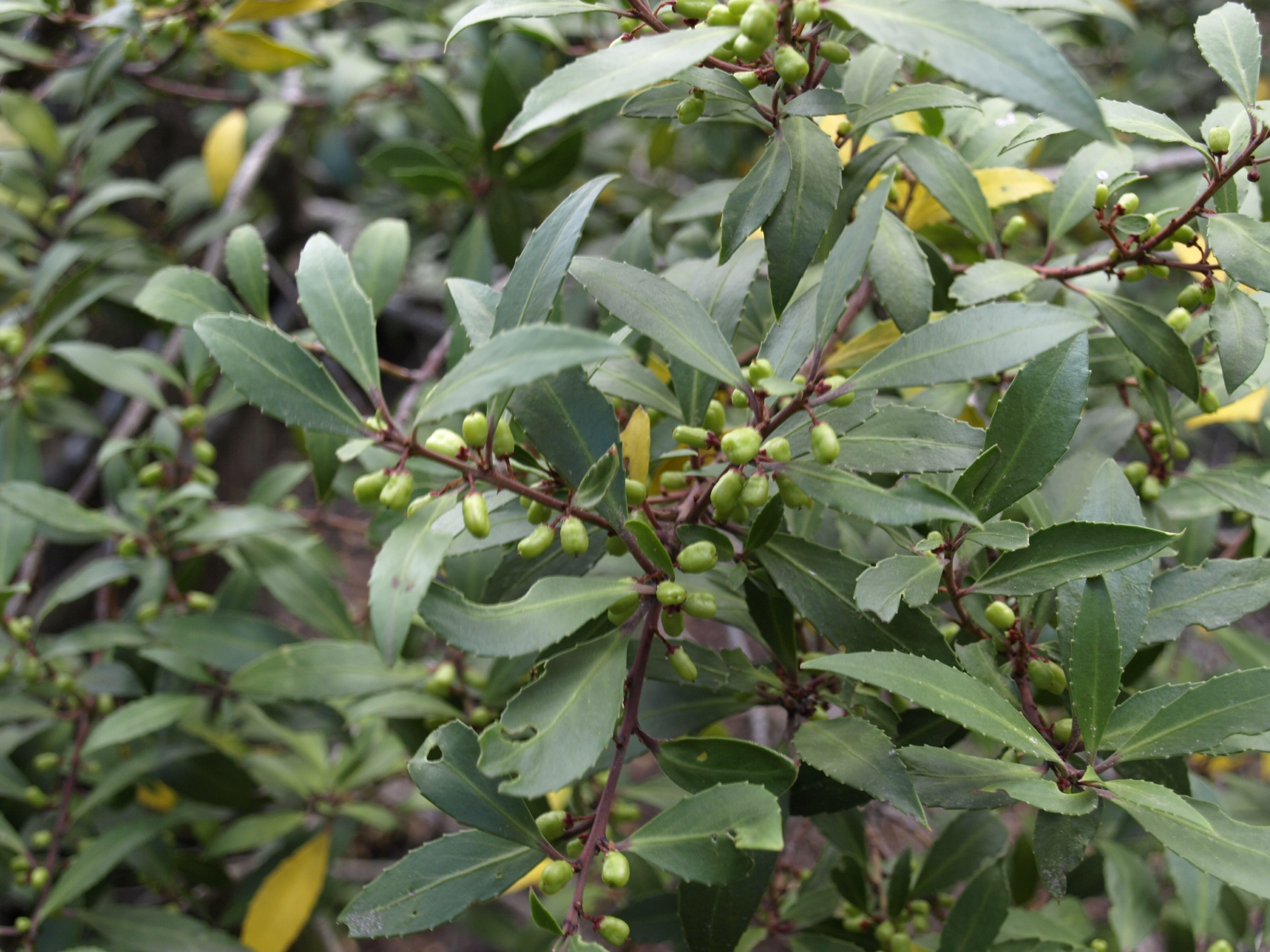

Scientific classification
- Kingdom: Plantae
- Clade: Tracheophytes
- Clade: Angiosperms
- Clade: Eudicots
- Clade: Rosids
- Order: Celastrales
- Family: Celastraceae
- Genus: Maytenus
- Species: M. magellanica

Binomial name
- Maytenus magellanica (Lam.) Hook.f.

= Maytenus magellanica =

Species of plant

Maytenus magellanica (Magellan's mayten or hard log mayten; leña dura in Spanish) is a small evergreen tree from the genus Maytenus, up to 5 meters (16 ft), in the Celastraceae. It grows in southern Argentina and Chile from 36ºS to Cape Horn (56ºS).

== Description ==
Leaves alternate, petiole 2–6 mm long, leaves are elliptic-lanceolate 2–6 cm long and 1,5–3 cm wide, thick and leathery, apex and base are attenuate, irregularly toothed margins. Reddish and deciduous stipules. Flowers are hermaphrodite or unisexual, in groups of 2–3 in the axils; five sepals about 1 mm long; five petals wine colored in 2–3,5 mm, ovary reduced in male flowers with five stamens; in female, the ovoid ovary ends in a short style and this in its turn, in flat bi-lobed stigmas. Fruit capsule 6–8 long and 5 mm wide, two valves which contain 1 to 2 seeds.

== Distribution and ecology ==
This shrub is relatively widespread and can endure rather harsh settings of windblown Patagonia including rocky soils of the Patagonian steppes. Distributed in southern Chile and Argentina, it is found as far south as the gelid climate of Tierra del Fuego. An example of its occurrence in the northern part of its range is the environment of Cueva del Milodon Natural Monument.

== Cultivation and uses ==
It is planted as ornamental tree. As its native range includes the subpolar Tierra del Fuego, the plant's hardiness is appreciated and it has been successfully introduced in the Faroe Islands.
