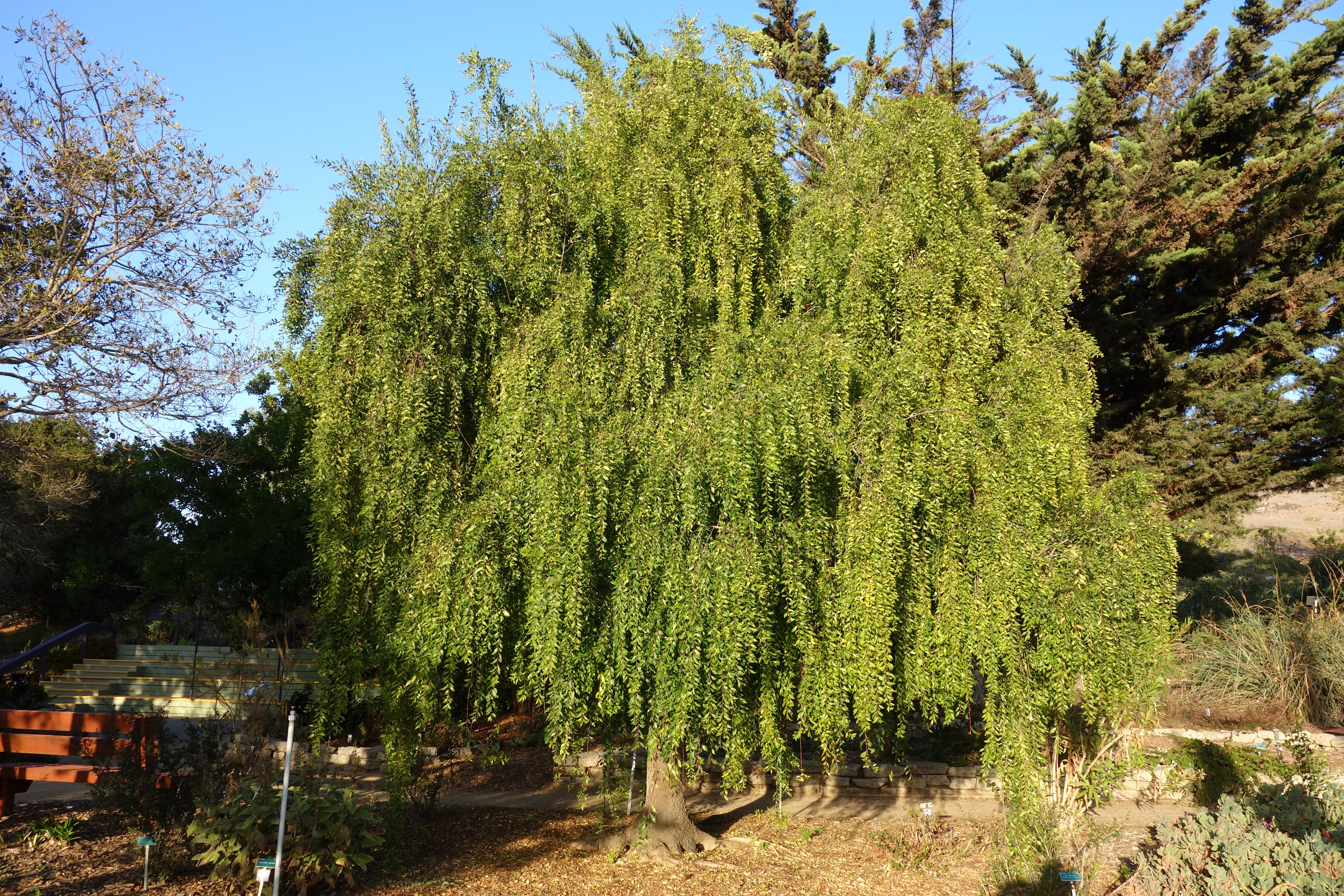

Conservation status
- Least Concern (IUCN 3.1)

Scientific classification
- Kingdom: Plantae
- Clade: Embryophytes
- Clade: Tracheophytes
- Clade: Spermatophytes
- Clade: Angiosperms
- Clade: Eudicots
- Clade: Rosids
- Order: Celastrales
- Family: Celastraceae
- Genus: Maytenus
- Species: M. boaria

Binomial name
- Maytenus boaria Molina

= Maytenus boaria =

Maitén

Species of plant

Maytenus boaria, commonly known as Maitén, is an evergreen tree in the family Celastraceae. It is native to southern South America (Chile, Argentina, Bolivia and southern Brazil). In Chile, it occurs approximately from 30 to 50°S. It can reach dimensions up to 20 m (66 ft) high and 80 cm (31 in) diameter, with a straight trunk.

== Description ==
Its leaves are small, alternate, elliptical, fine serrate margins, light green color, about 2.5 and 5 cm long. The flowers are small; male flowers are brownish yellow and female are green with purple lines. Its fruit is a yellow bivalve capsule, which contains one or two seeds, and is covered by a red-colored membrane. Its seeds are easy to germinate.

== Cultivation and uses ==
From its seeds oil is obtained in order to elaborate varnish. The hard wood is used in tool handles and as both ornamental in gardens and reforestation of Chile. European bees produce a very delicious honey from its flowers. Its tender leaves are used to feed cattle, In fact, the name boaria means bovine, because cattle enjoy feeding on them. It is easy to plant by seed.

Mayten tree is fully naturalized in New Zealand where it is spreading very rapidly in the Canterbury region, it now classed as an invasive species and illegal to sell or distribute in NZ.

A small number of trees have been planted in gardens of California and private collections in Spain, and all of them have acclimatized in those lands. It has been planted in the North Pacific Coast of the United States as far north as Seattle, Washington, and Vancouver, British Columbia.

== Occurrences ==
It is a slow-growing and drought-resistant tree. When growing wild in Argentina, a more continental climate, it is hardier than those in Chile; however, a provenance source has not been selected from Argentina for cultivation in Europe.

In Argentina, it is found also in Córdoba Province (an area with a continental climate and a dry season in winter), growing among Polylepis australis, a tree endemic of the central-pampean mountains of Argentina.

Example occurrences include the forested slopes of Cerro la Campana in the La Campana National Park of central Chile. There it is associated with the endangered Chilean wine palm (Jubaea chilensis) as well as a number of threatened understory plants, including Adiantum gertrudis.
