= Spice use in antiquity =

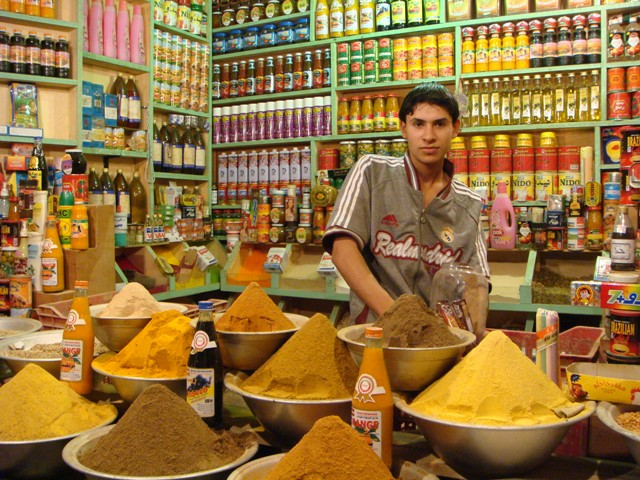
A spice market in Nasiriyah displaying certain spices.

The history of spices reach back thousands of years, dating back to the 8th century BCE. Spices are widely known to be developed and discovered in Asian civilizations. Spices have been used in a variety of antique developments for their unique qualities. There were a variety of spices that were used for common purposes across the ancient world. Different spices hold a value that can create a variety of products designed to enhance or suppress certain taste and/or sensations. Spices were also associated with certain rituals to perpetuate a superstition or fulfill a religious obligation, among other things. Spices have antimicrobial properties that may have helped protect ancient peoples against foodborne illnesses.

== History of early known spice use ==
=== Ancient Egypt ===
Spices classified as coriander, fennel, juniper, cumin, garlic and thyme are named in 1550 BCE Egyptian papyri for their specific health effects.

=== Ancient China ===
The publication of Shennong Ben Cao Jing, or The Classic of Herbal Medicine was in c. 2700 BCE according to mythology but historically it would have been written during the late Han dynasty.

=== Ancient Mesopotamia ===
Sumerian clay tablets dating from the 3rd millennium BCE mention various plants, including thyme. King Merodach-Baladan II (722–710 BCE) of Babylonia grew many spices and herbs (Ex: cardamom, coriander, garlic, thyme, saffron, and turmeric). The Babylonian moon god, Sin, was thought to control medicinal plants.

=== Ancient Persia ===
Records during the reign of King Cyrus (559–530 BCE) reported a purchase of 395,000 bunches of garlic. Moreover, Persians used to produce essential oils from roses, lilies, coriander, and saffron.

=== Indian origins ===
Spices and herbs such as black pepper, cinnamon, turmeric, and cardamom have been used by Indians for thousands of years for culinary and health purposes.

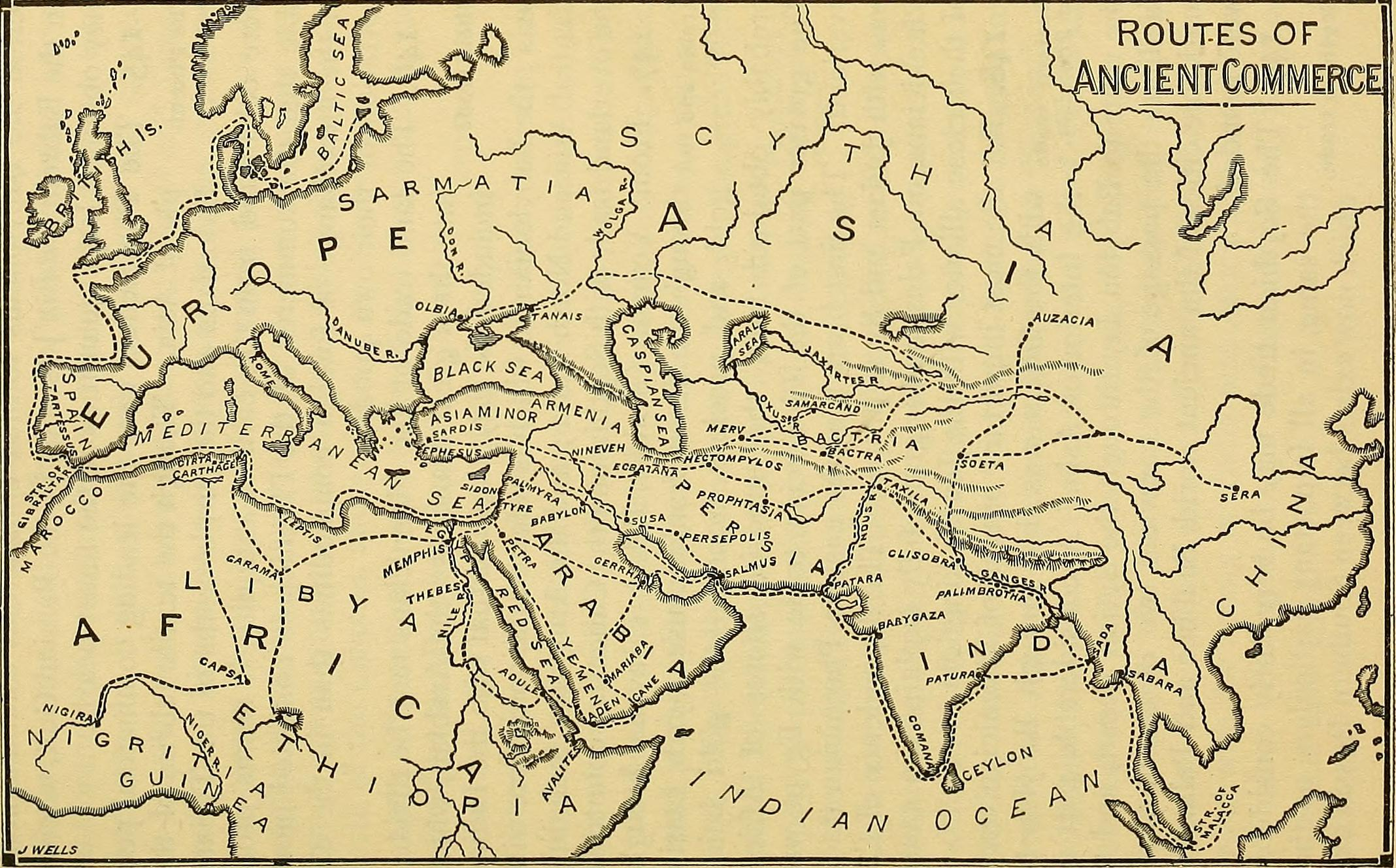
Routes of ancient commerce.

=== Greece and Rome ===
Largely due to Alexander the Great's conquest of Asia Minor, the Hellenic World was able to gain access to many Eastern spices. Many Eastern spices like pepper, cassia, cinnamon, and ginger were imported by the ancient Greeks. Hippocrates, often called the "Father of Medicine,"wrote many treatises on medicinal plants including saffron, cinnamon, thyme, coriander, mint, and marjoram. One of the most important Greek medicinal spices was used as early as the 7th century BCE and was known as Silphium, a plant that went extinct in the 1st century CE.

=== Common spices by region ===
Many spices originated from particular regions in the classical world, however they made their way invariably from one region to another across the ancient world through trade.

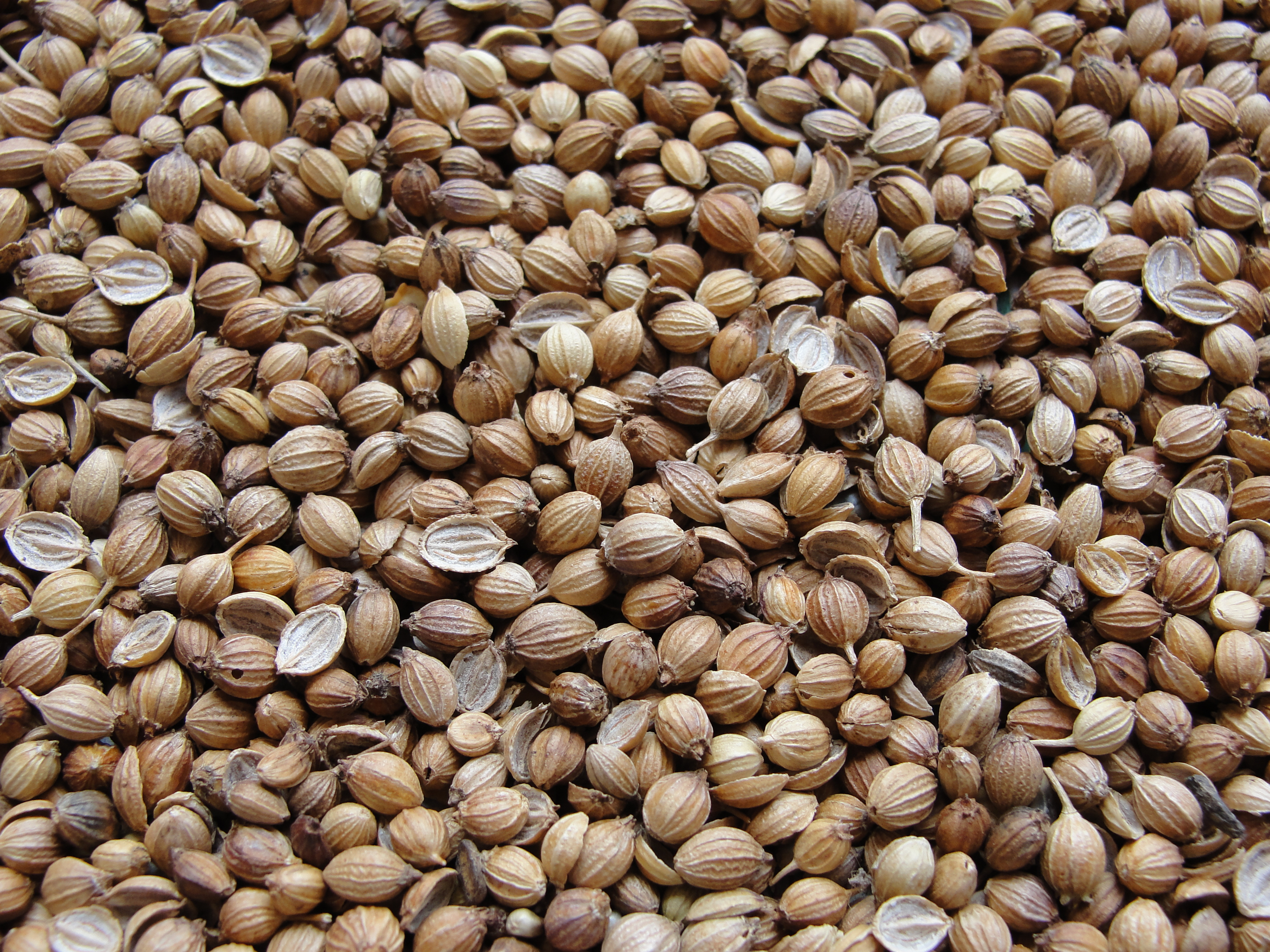
Coriander seeds.

==== Mediterranean ====
- Ajowan (Trachyspermum copticum)
- Anise (Pimpinella anisum)
- Coriander (Coriandrum sativum)
- Cumin (Cuminum cyminum)
- Fennel (Foeniculum vulgare)
- Hyssop (Hyssopus officinalis)
- Garden cress (Lepidium sativum)
- Lavender (Lavandula angustifolia)
- Mahaleb cherry (Prunus mahaleb)
- Myrtle (Myrtus communis)
- Nigella (Nigella sativa)
- Oregano (Origanum vulgare)
- Rocket (Eruca sativa)
- Rosemary (Rosmarinus officinalis)
- Rue (Ruta graveolens)
- Sage (Salvia officinalis)
- Saffron (Crocus sativus)
- Savory (Satureja hortensis)
- Sumac (Rhus coriaria)
- Thyme (Thyumus vulgaris)
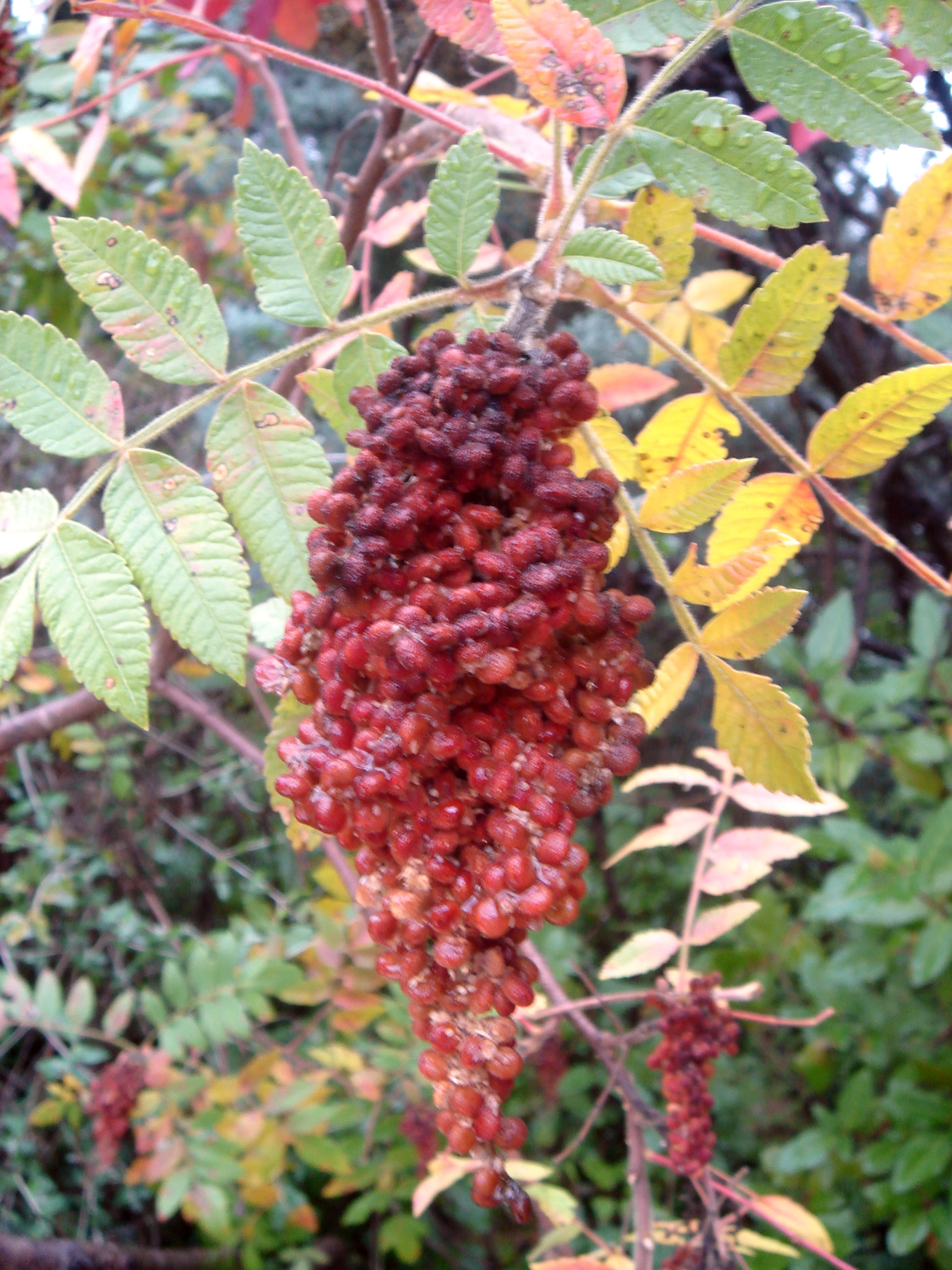
  Fruit of a sumac tree.
- Silphium

==== Central and northern Europe ====
- Bear's garlic (ramson) (Allium ursinum)
- Blue fenugreek (Trigonella caerulea)
- Borage (Borago officinalis)
- Caraway (Carum carvi)
- Celery seeds (Apium graveolens)
- Chives (Allium schoenoprasum)
- Cicely (Myrrhis odorata)
- Gale (Myrica gale)
- Horseradish (Armoracia rusticana)
- Juniper (Juniperus communis)
- Mugwort (Artemisia vulgaris)
- Southernwood (Artemisia abrotanum)
- Watercress (Nasturtium officinale)

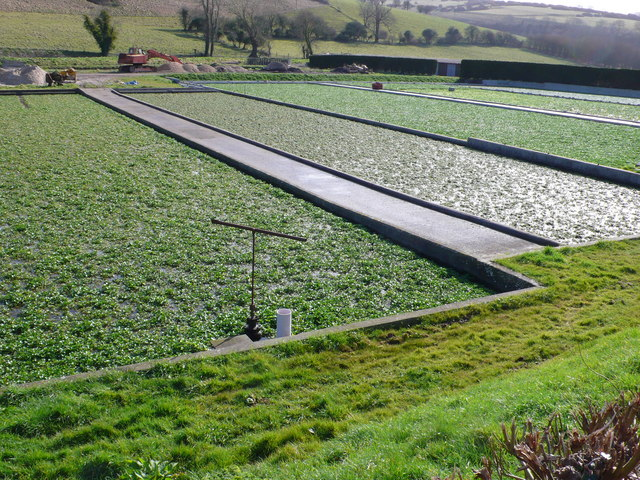
Lower Magiston watercress beds near Sydling St Nicholas

==== South Asia ====
- Basil (Ocimum basilicum)
- Black cardamom (Amomum subulatum)
- Black cumin (Bunium persicum)
- Black pepper (Piper nigrum)
- Cardamom (Elettaria cardamomum)
- Cinnamon (Cinnamomum zeylanicum)
- Curry leaf (Murraya koenigii)
- Indian bay leaf (Cinnamomum tamala)
- Long pepper (Piper longum)
- Screw pine (pandanus) flower (Pandanus odoratissimus)
- Turmeric (Curcuma longa)

==== West and central Asia ====
- Asafetida (Ferula assa-foetida)
- Bay leaf (Laurus nobilis)
- Black mustard seed (Brassica nigra)
- Dill seed (Anethum graveolens)
- Fenugreek (Trigonella foenum-graecum)
- Garden cress (Lepidium sativum)
- Garlic (Allium sativum)
- Marjoram (Majorana hortensis)
- Rose (Rosa damascena)
- Tarragon (Artemisia daracunculus)

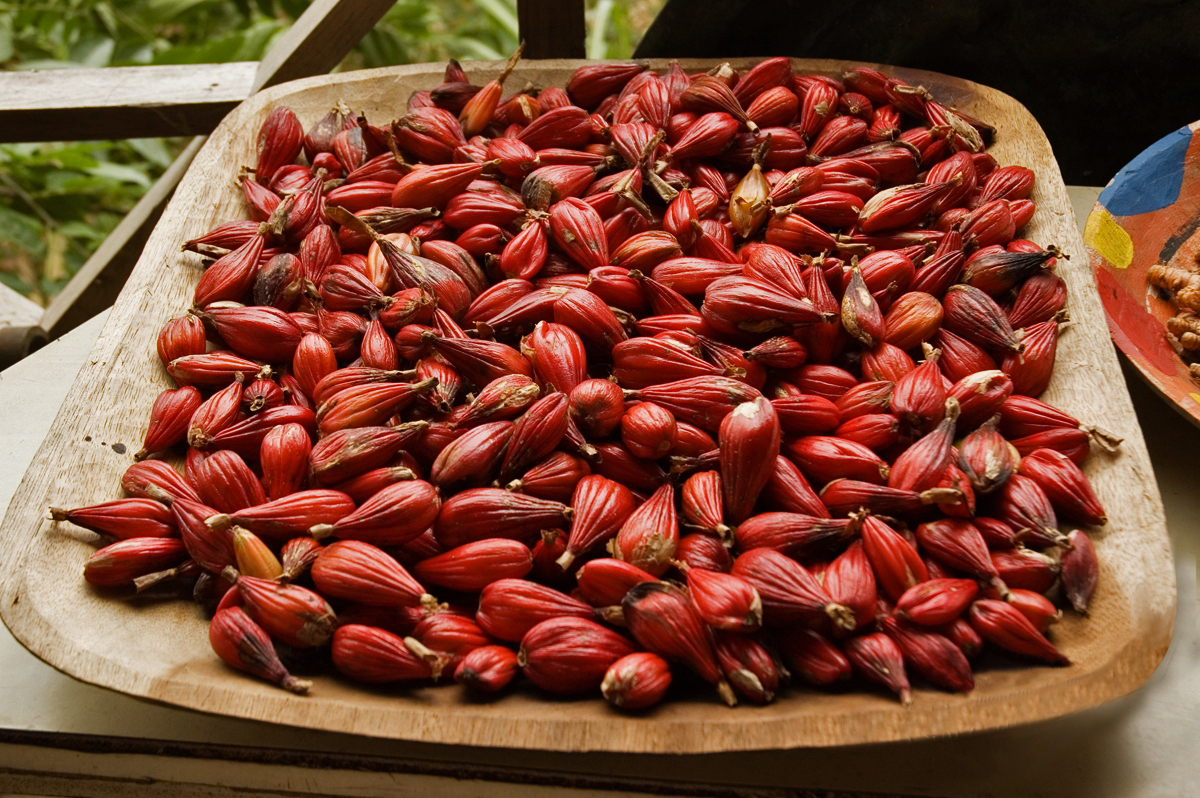
Grains of paradise (Aframomum melegueta) pods.

==== Africa ====
- Aidan fruit (Prekese, aridan, osakrisa, uyayak, dawo) (Tetrapleura tetraptera)
- Alligator pepper (ose oji, Atare) (Aframomum daniellii, Aframomum citratum, Aframomum exscapum)
- Ashanti pepper (uziza, edo pepper, guinea cubeb) (Piper guineense)
- Calabash nutmeg (ehuru, Jamaican nutmeg) (Monodora myristica)
- Grains of paradise (melegueta pepper) (Aframomum melegueta)
- Korarima (Aframomum corrorima)
- Negro pepper (kani pepper, uda) (Xylopia aethiopica)
- Scent leaf (African basil) (Ocimum gratissimum)

Fermentation is a huge part of African, specifically west African, spice culture. Many spices are made from the fermented seeds of various plants like egusi, castor, African locust bean, etc.

=== Cultivation ===
The main reason saffron is considered one of the most expensive spices in the world is due to the cultivation process, coupled with the amount of produced saffron per crocus (Crocus sativus) cultivated. It takes about 4,000 stigma to produce one ounce of saffron, and only three red stigma are produced by one crocus flower.

Coriander is an annual shrub cultivated for its aromatic seeds which was used as a condiment or for medicinal use as a carminative and stimulant. It was cultivated in Greece as early as the 2nd millennium BCE, even though it originally came from the West Asia/North Africa region. Linear B tablets talk of its use in perfumes as well as use of spice from the seed and herb from its leaves. Coriander seeds were planted in the month of July but only germinates when its moistened. The species is particularly opposed to hot weather which mildews the coriander leaf. It was also cultivated for medicinal cooling effects, when applied with bread, to an ulcer and for expelling worms when mixed with wine.

Caper is a biennial spiny shrub that bears round fleshy leaves and big pinkish-white flowers. This spice is native to the Greek Islands growing in rocky coastal areas. There were very few preservatives in ancient times, so capers were cultivated for their pickling qualities. The spice from capers comes from the unopened flower buds. The earliest found reference and use comes from Greece in the 7th century BCE. However the beginning of the intentional cultivation of capers is unclear, dated to anytime between the 4th century BCE and 1st century CE.

Opium poppy is an annual plant with white spotted petals and a large ovoid capsule native to the Iberian Peninsula, the spice comes from the oil released by the poppy seed during a cold press. The seeds are steeped in warm water to make a tea for the medicinal purpose of calming a cough.

Celery is a biennial plant, native to the mediterranean region where it grows close to the sea or in moist places. Celery is harvested for its vegetative body which can be eaten raw, and for its seed which are used for flavorings and its medicinal use as a remedy for kidney stones. Earliest known Greek use of Celery was in the 9th century BCE. Other medicinal uses of celery include its good regulatory effects and as a soporific drug.

== Products and uses ==
=== Perfumes ===
Greek inclination towards bathing which started in the 1st millennium BCE spread the use of oils and perfumed oils. Many Greek cities and scholars fought against the use of perfumed oils making them illegal for men to purchase. Baths continued to gain popularity when in the 1st century BCE, following the fall of the Greek city states to Roman rule, the Romans began building public bathhouses. Use of cinnamon by soaking cinnamon leaves produced a product that sweetened the breath and scented clothing.

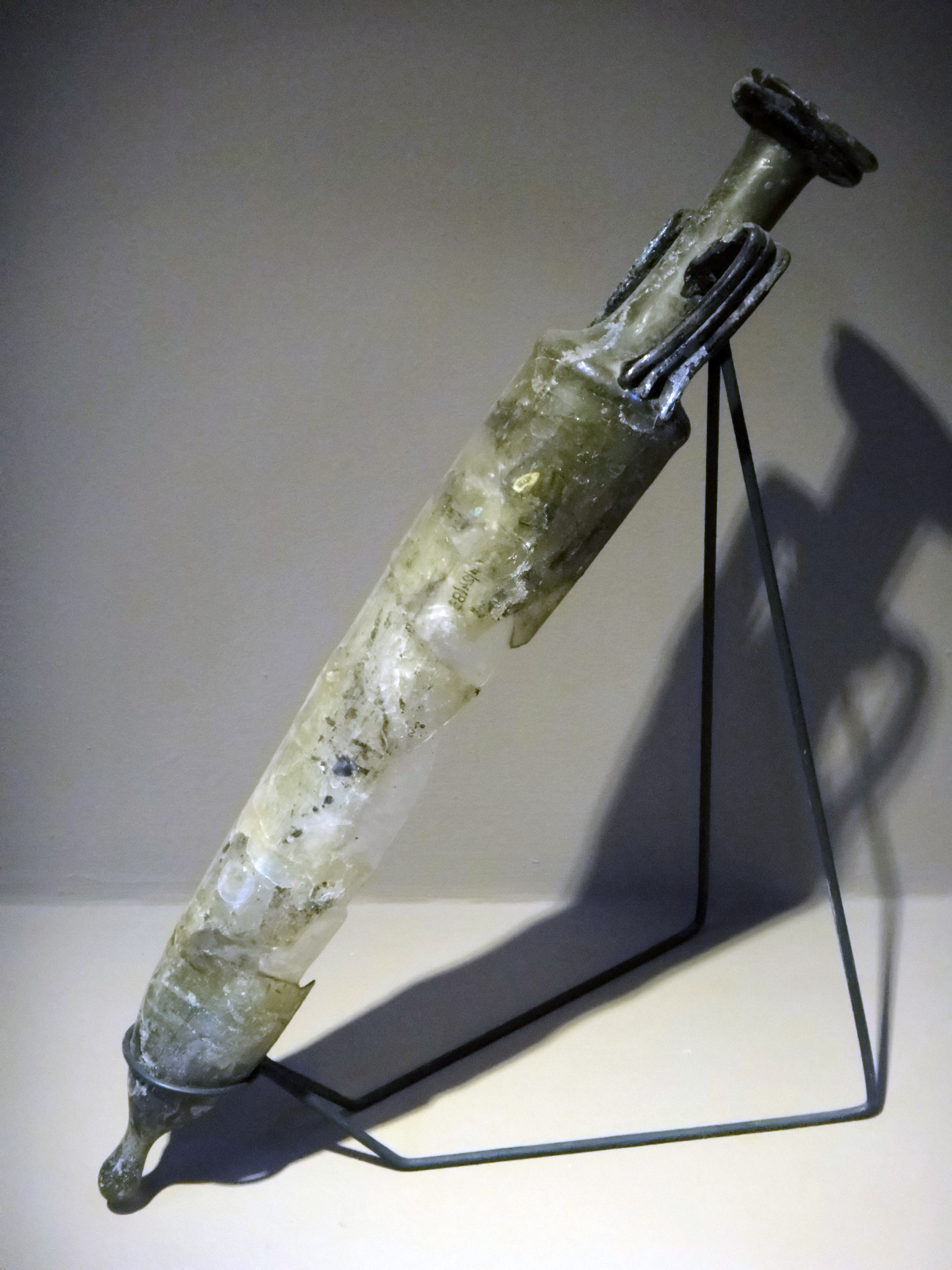
An ancient perfume amphora found in the ruins in Ephesus from the 2nd century CE.

Frankincense was also used as a sacred perfume to fumigate houses due to its known medicinal uses for bronchitis and coughs, swellings, and dental problems.

It was said that the gods wished to be perfumed, whereupon their sacred spaces would be filled with the smell of burning incense or their occult symbols were anointed with oils.

The spice saffron has been considered one of the most expensive spices in the course of human history, one of its many primary uses come from the oil extracted from the plant which is a necessary ingredient in many perfumes.

=== Medicine ===
Spices have been used for their medicinal qualities as far back as traceable history and even now with current archaeological discoveries, pre-history. An example of spices being used for medicinal in early civilizations, can be found in The Ebers Papyrus, which is an Egyptian scroll listing plants used as medicines, which dates back to about 1550 BCE

Spices offer a variety of qualities, the medicinal quality of spices such as horseradish with its strong and bitter taste were believed by the Greeks to alleviate back pain, and its use for treatment of scurvy led to its being worth its weight in gold. Other such characteristics of horseradish that is indicative of many other kinds of spices such as its use as a diuretic.

Common medicinal spices by genre:

- Hot, Pungent

Spice	Effect
Ajowan	Expectorant, anti-flatulent
Chive	antiseptic, diuretic
Cinnamon	antiseptic, anti-diarrhea
Clove	topical anesthetic, anti-dyspeptic
Coriander	anti-spasmodic, diuretic, anti-inflammatory
Cumin	anti-microbial, vermifuge, diuretic
Curry Leaves	anti-emetic
Garlic	anti-microbial, anti-hypercholesterolemic, anti-cancer, anti-hypertensive
Ginger	For colds, anti-emetic, anti-rheumatic
Horseradish	anti-microbial, expectorant, purgative
Mustards	counter-irritant, emetic, purgative
Nutmeg, Mace	astringent, hallucinogen
Paprika	colorant, source of ascorbic acid
Peppercorns	expectorant, anti-microbial
Saffron	anti-rheumatic, for neuralgia
Turmeric	anti-arthritic, antioxidant, anti-cancer

- Warm, Fragrant

Spice	Effect
Aniseed	anti-spasmodic, expectorant, sedative
Caraway	diuretic, anti-spasmodic, galactagogue
Cardamom	antiseptic
Cilantro	antibacterial, anti-inflammatory
Fennel	anti-spasmodic, diuretic
Licorice	anti-spasmodic, anti-tussive, for peptic ulcer
Sesame seed	diuretic, galactagogue, demulcent
Star anise	antiseptic, anti-rheumatic

- Savory

Spice	Effect
Basil	for colds, anti-diarrhea, kidney disease
Bay	embrocation, anti-rheumatic
Caper	diuretic, expectorant, astringent
Celery	diuretic, emmenagogue
Cilantro	diuretic, sedative
Dill	anti-flatulent, anti-colic, galactagogue
Mint	expectorant, for colds, local anesthesia, anti-spasm
Oregano	anti-tussive, anti-rheumatic, vermifuge, diuretic, deodorizer
Poppy seed	sedative, anti-spasmodic

=== Ritual use ===
The ritual use of spices was common in the classical era, in many instances, spices were used in oils by soaking them or creating fragrances by burning them. However, many of the spices that became commonplace in the late classical period were spices that were originally from countries outside of Roman territory and acquired through trade.

God	Spice/Incense
Kronos	Styrax
Zeus	Malabathron
Ares	Kostos
Helios	Frankincense
Aphrodite	Indian Nard
Hermes	Cassia
Selene	Myrrh

The Jews in Jerusalem had access to spices that originated from India and came by way of the spice trade, whether it was due to their position on the spice trade route or through access given to them by their connection with the Roman Empire. It was said that Jesus was anointed in an oil of exotic spice from Indian origins called spikenard, which was proof that the Roman Empire's spice trade established exotic spices as necessary for certain Mediterranean cultures' religious practices.

== See also ==
- Ancient Roman cuisine
