= Aframomum pseudostipulare =

Scientific classification
- Kingdom: Plantae
- Clade: Tracheophytes
- Clade: Angiosperms
- Clade: Monocots
- Clade: Commelinids
- Order: Zingiberales
- Family: Zingiberaceae
- Genus: Aframomum
- Species: A. pseudostipulare

Binomial name
- Aframomum pseudostipulare Loes. & Mildbr. ex Koechlin

Species of flowering plant in the ginger family

Aframomum pseudostipulare is a species of plant in the ginger family, Zingiberaceae. It was first described by Ludwig Eduard Loesener, Gottfried Wilhelm Johannes Mildbraed, and Jean Koechlin.
