= Alligator pepper =

Spice made from the seeds of Aframomum species

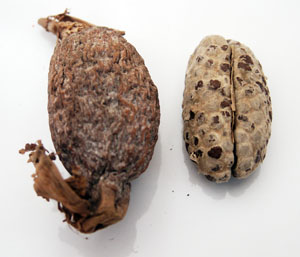
Alligator pepper fruit and seeds

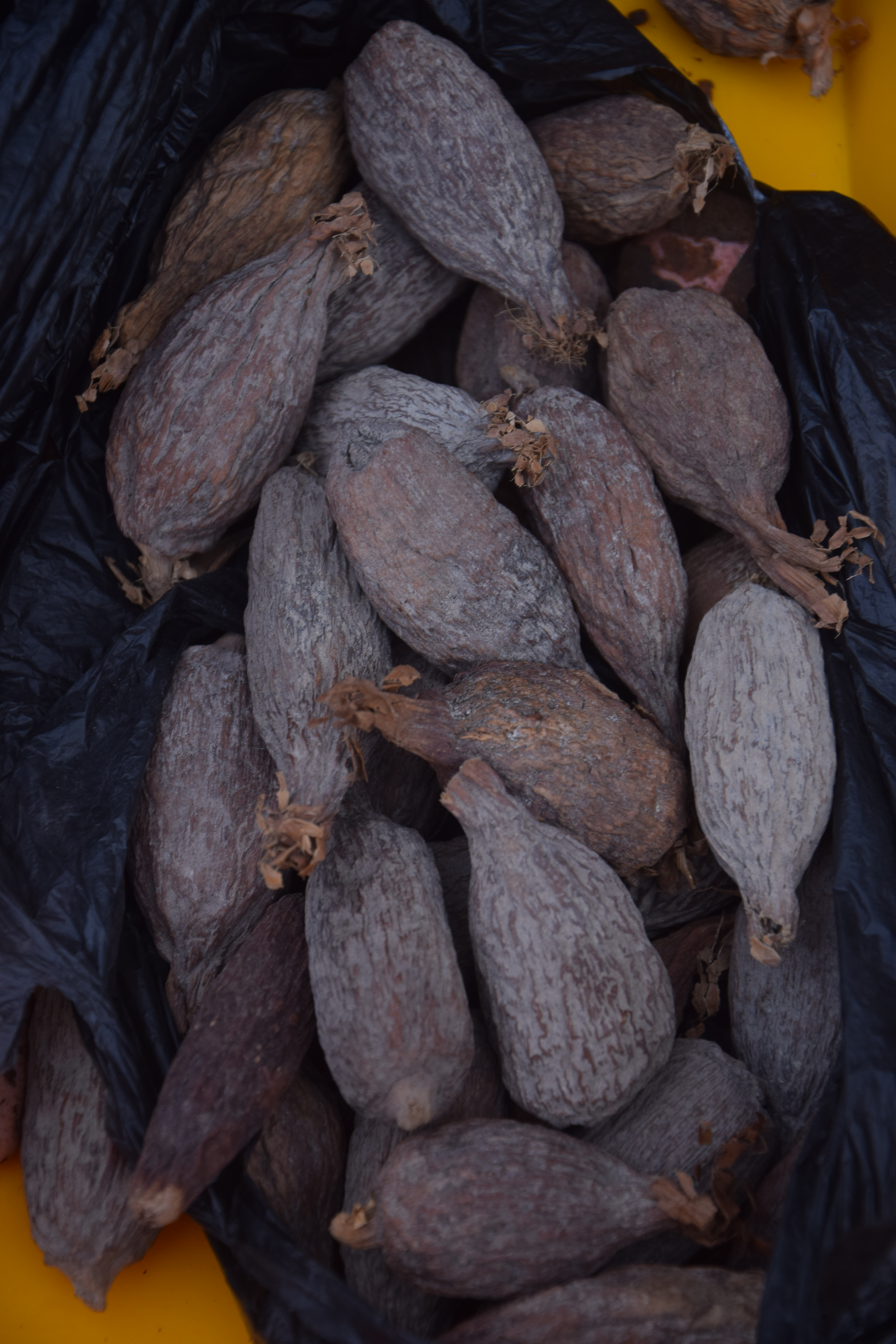
Dried fruits, as they appear in commerce

Alligator pepper (also known as Ishitɛ, Ata Ire, Ose Oji, mbongo spice, ntuen ibok(Efik/Ibibio) Kàsù(Boki language), or hepper pepper or ehien-edo in Bini language) is a West African spice made from the seeds and seed pods of Aframomum daniellii, A. citratum, or A. exscapum. It is a close relative of grains obtained from the closely related species, Aframomum melegueta or "grains of paradise". Unlike grains of paradise, which are generally sold as only the seeds of the plant, alligator pepper is sold as the entire pod containing the seeds (in the same manner to another close relative, black cardamom).

The plants which provide alligator pepper are herbaceous, perennial, flowering plants of the ginger family (Zingiberaceae), native to swampy habitats along the West African coast. Once the pod is open and the seeds are revealed, the reason for this spice's common English name becomes apparent as the seeds have a papery skin enclosing them and the bumps of the seeds within this skin is reminiscent of an alligator's back.

As mbongo spice, the seeds of alligator pepper are often sold as grains isolated from the pod and with the outer skin removed. Mbongo spice is most commonly either A. danielli or A. citratum, and has a more floral aroma than A. exscapum (which is the commonest source of the entire pod).

It is a common ingredient in West African cuisine, where it imparts both pungency and a spicy aroma to soups and stews.

== Use in cuisine ==
Even in West Africa, alligator pepper is an expensive spice, so is used sparingly. Often, a single whole pod is pounded in a pestle and mortar before half of it is added (along with black pepper) as a flavouring to West African soups or boiled rice. The spice can also be substituted in any recipe using grains of paradise or black cardamom to provide a hotter and more pungent flavour.

When babies are born in Yoruba culture, they are given a small taste of alligator pepper (atare) shortly after birth as part of the routine baby-welcoming process, and it is also used as an ingredient at traditional meet-and-greets.

In Igboland, alligator pepper, ósè ọ́jị́ with kola nuts are used in naming ceremonies, as presentation to visiting guests, and for other social events with the kola nut rite. The Igbo present and eat the alligator pepper together with kola nuts. In virtually every Igbo ceremony, alligator peppers and kola nuts are presented to guests at the top of the agenda and prior to any other food or entertainment. Prayers and libations are made together with kola nuts and alligator pepper.

In Ibibio, Efik (Akwa Ibom State and Cross River State of Nigeria where it is known as Ntuen Ibok, it has a central part in ceremonies as well as being used for medicinal purposes.

During the COVID-19 pandemic, it was used in medicine.
