= Aframomum laxiflorum =

Scientific classification
- Kingdom: Plantae
- Clade: Tracheophytes
- Clade: Angiosperms
- Clade: Monocots
- Clade: Commelinids
- Order: Zingiberales
- Family: Zingiberaceae
- Genus: Aframomum
- Species: A. laxiflorum

Binomial name
- Aframomum laxiflorum Loes. ex Lock

Species of flowering plant

Aframomum laxiflorum is a species in the ginger family, Zingiberaceae. It was first described by Ludwig Eduard Loesener and renamed by John Michael Lock.

== Range ==
Aframomum laxiflorum is native to Tanzania in the Uluguru and Uzungwa Mountains.

== Description ==
It resembles the West African Aframomum exscapum in its pubescent ovary, but is otherwise very distinct from it, and from all other species in the genus. The elongated inflorescence axis, and the lack of both lateral and terminal appendages to the anther crest are features which occur nowhere else in the genus. The long delicate ligules, and the richly coloured flowers, described by Schlieben as 'sch6nen grossen, weinrot und lila schraffierten Blitten' should make it a distinctive plant in the field. The fruit is at present unknown.
