= Aframomum stanfieldii =

Scientific classification
- Kingdom: Plantae
- Clade: Tracheophytes
- Clade: Angiosperms
- Clade: Monocots
- Clade: Commelinids
- Order: Zingiberales
- Family: Zingiberaceae
- Genus: Aframomum
- Species: A. stanfieldii

Binomial name
- Aframomum stanfieldii Hepper

Species of flowering plant

Aframomum stanfieldii is a species in the ginger family, Zingiberaceae. It was first described by Frank Nigel Hepper.

== Range ==
Aframomum stanfieldii is native from Western Tropical Africa to Cameroon.
