= Aframomum longiligulatum =

Scientific classification
- Kingdom: Plantae
- Clade: Tracheophytes
- Clade: Angiosperms
- Clade: Monocots
- Clade: Commelinids
- Order: Zingiberales
- Family: Zingiberaceae
- Genus: Aframomum
- Species: A. longiligulatum

Binomial name
- Aframomum longiligulatum Koechlin

Species of flowering plant

Aframomum longiligulatum is a species in the ginger family, Zingiberaceae. It was first described by Jean Koechlin.

== Range ==
Aframomum longiligulatum is found in Cameroon in forests with Gilbertiodendron dewevrei up to 700 meters elevation.
