= Aframomum amaniense =

Scientific classification
- Kingdom: Plantae
- Clade: Tracheophytes
- Clade: Angiosperms
- Clade: Monocots
- Clade: Commelinids
- Order: Zingiberales
- Family: Zingiberaceae
- Genus: Aframomum
- Species: A. amaniense

Binomial name
- Aframomum amaniense Loes.

Species of plant

Aframomum amaniense is a monocotyledonous plant species described by Ludwig Eduard Loesener. Aframomum amaniense is part of the genus Aframomum and the family Zingiberaceae. No subspecies are listed in the Catalog of Life.
