= Ilex ovalis =

Conservation status
- Least Concern (IUCN 3.1)

Scientific classification
- Kingdom: Plantae
- Clade: Tracheophytes
- Clade: Angiosperms
- Clade: Eudicots
- Clade: Asterids
- Order: Aquifoliales
- Family: Aquifoliaceae
- Genus: Ilex
- Species: I. ovalis

Binomial name
- Ilex ovalis (Ruiz & Pav.) Loes.

Synonyms
- Ilex lechleri Loes.; Ilex matthewsii Loes.; Ilex paltoria Pers.; Paltoria ovalis Ruiz & Pav.

Species of plant

Ilex ovalis is a species of flowering plant in the holly family Aquifoliaceae. It is native to Ecuador and Peru.
