= Aframomum mildbraedii =

Conservation status
- Least Concern (IUCN 3.1)

Scientific classification
- Kingdom: Plantae
- Clade: Tracheophytes
- Clade: Angiosperms
- Clade: Monocots
- Clade: Commelinids
- Order: Zingiberales
- Family: Zingiberaceae
- Genus: Aframomum
- Species: A. mildbraedii

Binomial name
- Aframomum mildbraedii Loes.

Species of flowering plant in the ginger family

Aframomum mildbraedii is a species of plant in the ginger family, Zingiberaceae. It was first described by Ludwig Eduard Theodor Loesener.
