= Aframomum aulacocarpos =

Scientific classification
- Kingdom: Plantae
- Clade: Tracheophytes
- Clade: Angiosperms
- Clade: Monocots
- Clade: Commelinids
- Order: Zingiberales
- Family: Zingiberaceae
- Genus: Aframomum
- Species: A. aulacocarpos

Binomial name
- Aframomum aulacocarpos Pellegr. ex Koechlin

Species of plant

Aframomum aulacocarpos is a monocotyledonous plant species described by François Pellegrin and Jean Koechlin. Aframomum aulacocarpos is part of the genus Aframomum and the family Zingiberaceae. No subspecies are listed in the Catalog of Life.
