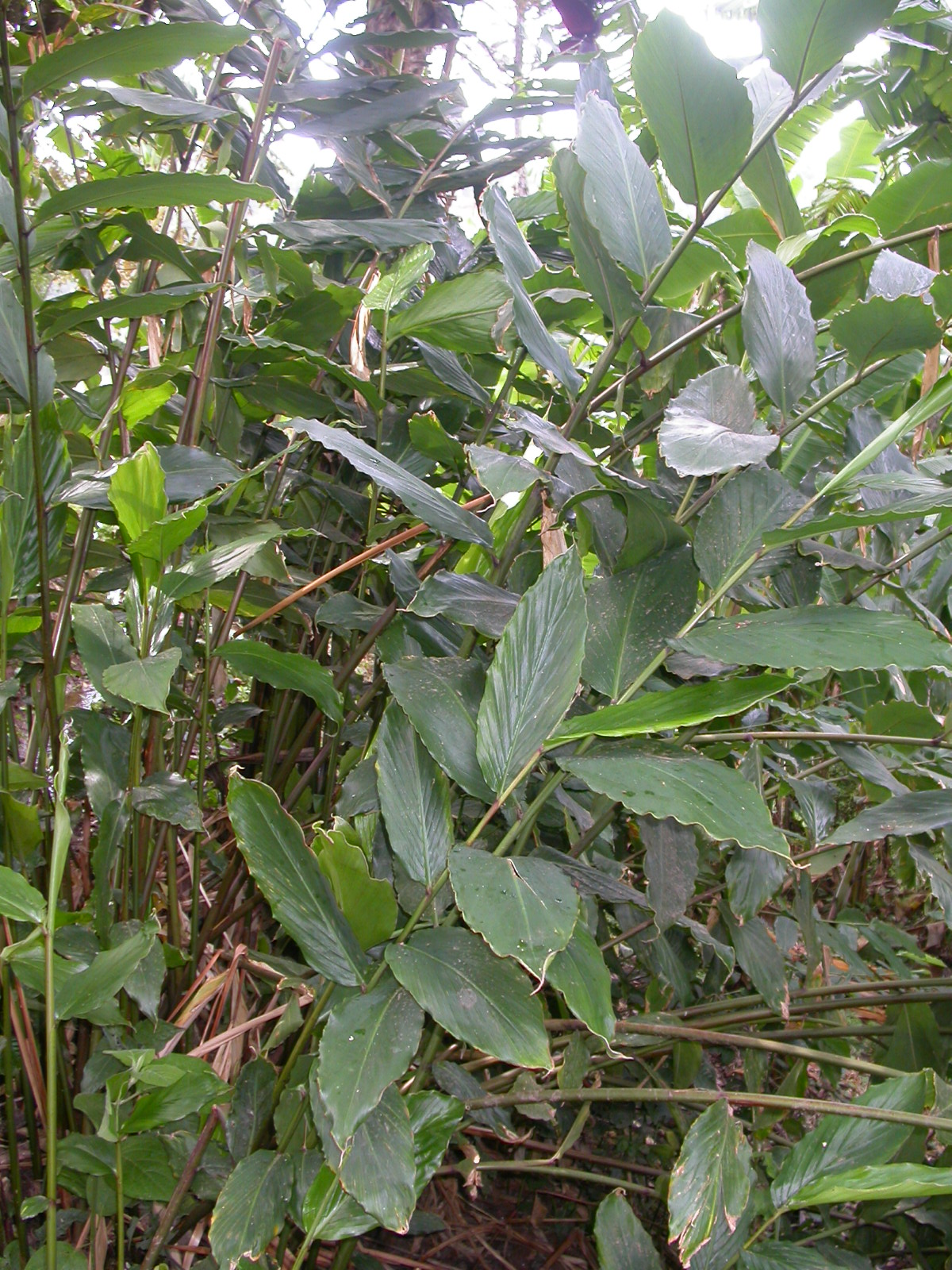

Conservation status
- Least Concern (IUCN 3.1)

Scientific classification
- Kingdom: Plantae
- Clade: Tracheophytes
- Clade: Angiosperms
- Clade: Monocots
- Clade: Commelinids
- Order: Zingiberales
- Family: Zingiberaceae
- Genus: Aframomum
- Species: A. zambesiacum

Binomial name
- Aframomum zambesiacum (Baker) K.Schum.

Synonyms
- Amomum zambesiacum Baker (basionym)

= Aframomum zambesiacum =

Species of plant

Aframomum zambesiacum is a species in the ginger family, Zingiberaceae. Its common name is nangawo. It is native to Kimalila, part of the southern highlands in Tanzania. A. zambesiacum grows in upland and secondary forests, often near water, between altitudes of 1,450–2,050 m (4,760–6,730 ft).

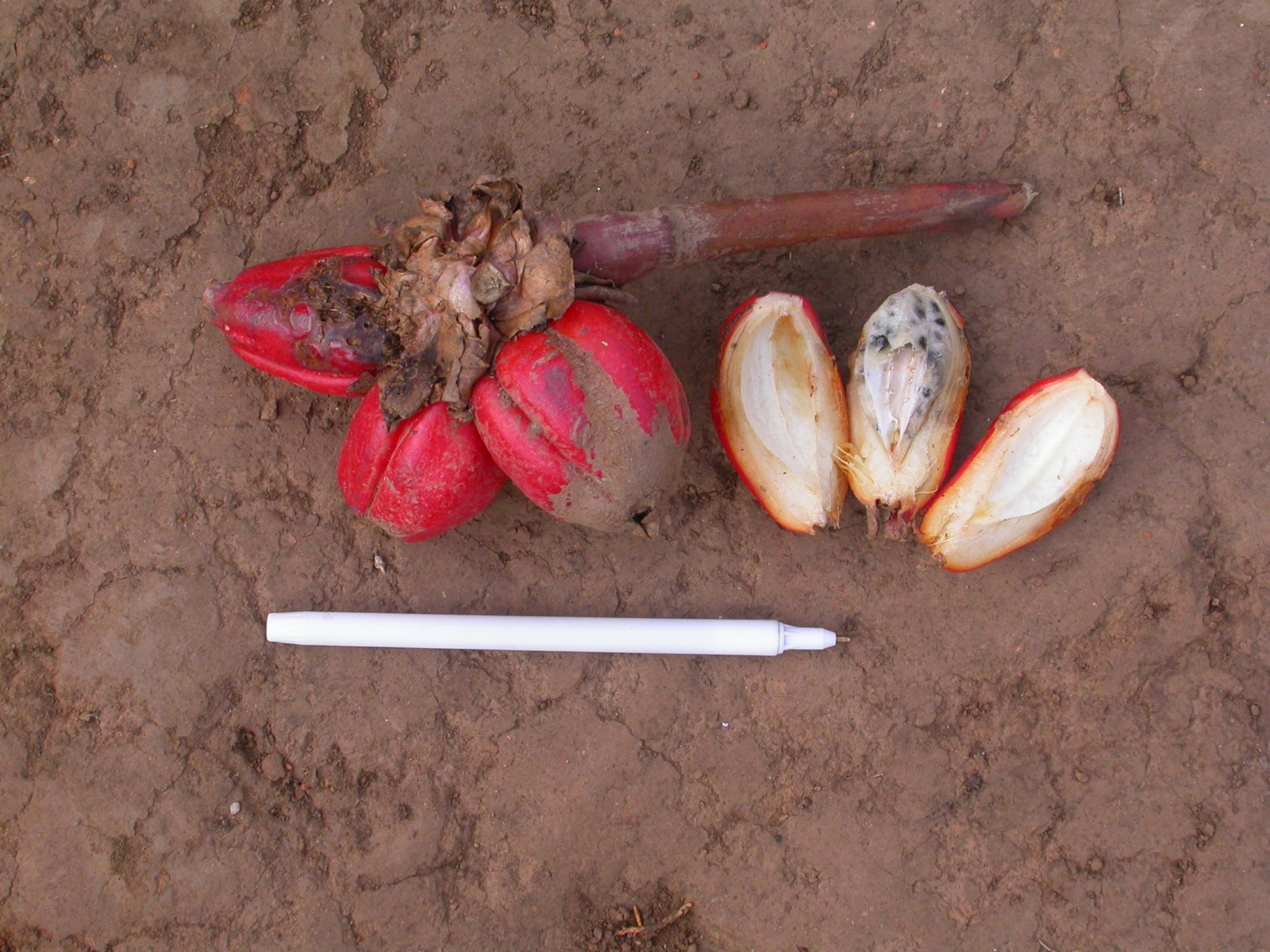
Aframomum zambesiacum fruits

Aframomum zambesiacum is a leafy plant that grows from a short, branched rhizome. The leafy stems grow in clumps up to 2 m (6.6 ft) tall. 20–50 bee-pollinated flowers are borne in heads arising from the base of the shoots. Petals are white with a large crimson patch at the base. The red fruits are oval, 7 cm (2.8 in) long and 4–5 cm (1.6–2.0 in) wide with prominent ridges running from top to bottom. Seeds are shiny and dark-brown.
