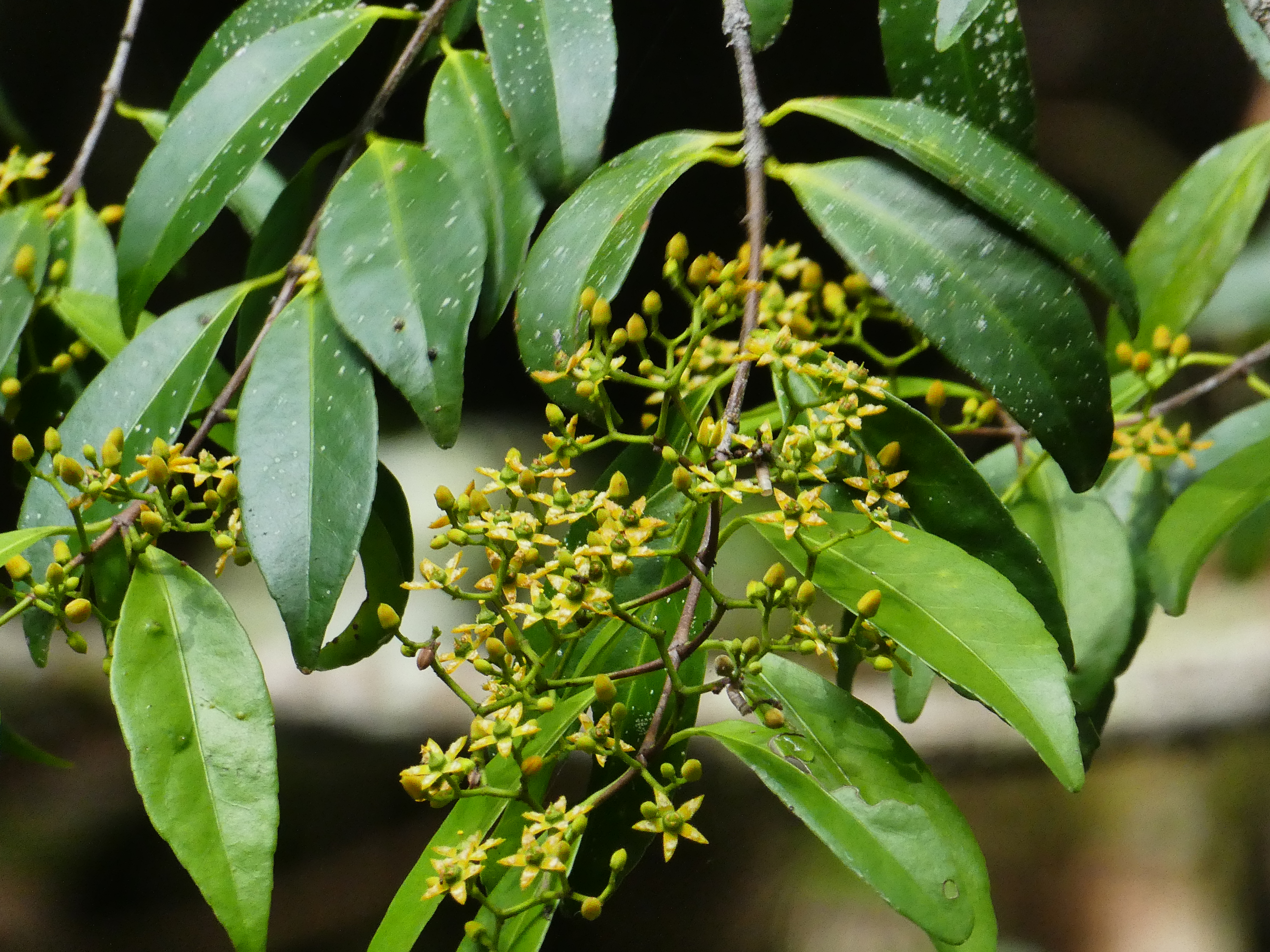
- In flower near Cairns, Queensland

Conservation status
- Least Concern (NCA)

Scientific classification
- Kingdom: Plantae
- Clade: Tracheophytes
- Clade: Angiosperms
- Clade: Eudicots
- Clade: Rosids
- Order: Celastrales
- Family: Celastraceae
- Genus: Loeseneriella
- Species: L. barbata

Binomial name
- Loeseneriella barbata (F.Muell.) C.T.White

= Loeseneriella barbata =

Knot vine

Species of flowering plant

Loeseneriella barbata, commonly known as knot vine, is a climbing plant in the family Celastraceae found in New South Wales and Queensland, Australia. It was first described in 1859 and its tendrils form distinctive "knots" around its supports.

== Description ==
Loeseneriella barbata is a woody vine with a stem diameter up to 4 cm (1.6 in), whose tendrils often form knot-like coils around supports. The leaves are quite stiff and arranged in opposite pairs. They are elliptic, ovate or lanceolate and measure up to 12 cm (4.7 in) long and 6 cm (2.4 in) wide. Flowers are produced in branched cymes and are about 10 mm (0.39 in) wide with 5 or 6 yellow petals. The fruit is a capsule about 5 cm (2.0 in) long and 3 cm (1.2 in) wide containing a number of winged seeds about 3 cm (1.2 in) long.

== Taxonomy ==
This plant was first described as Hippocratea barbata by botanist Ferdinand von Mueller in 1859, and transferred to the genus Loeseneriella in 1944 by Cyril Tenison White. However, the latter name is not recognised by any of the relevant Australian authorities, who all still accept Mueller's original botanical name.

== Distribution and habitat ==
The knot vine occurs in two widely separated populations in eastern parts of Queensland and northeastern New South Wales. The northern population is found from the top of Cape York Peninsula south to about Ayr. The southern population begins at Rockhampton, about 530 km (330 mi) south of Ayr, and continues into the far northern corner of New South Wales to about Grafton.

== Conservation ==
This species is listed as least concern under the Queensland Government's Nature Conservation Act. As of 10 December 2024, it has not been assessed by the International Union for Conservation of Nature (IUCN).

== Gallery ==
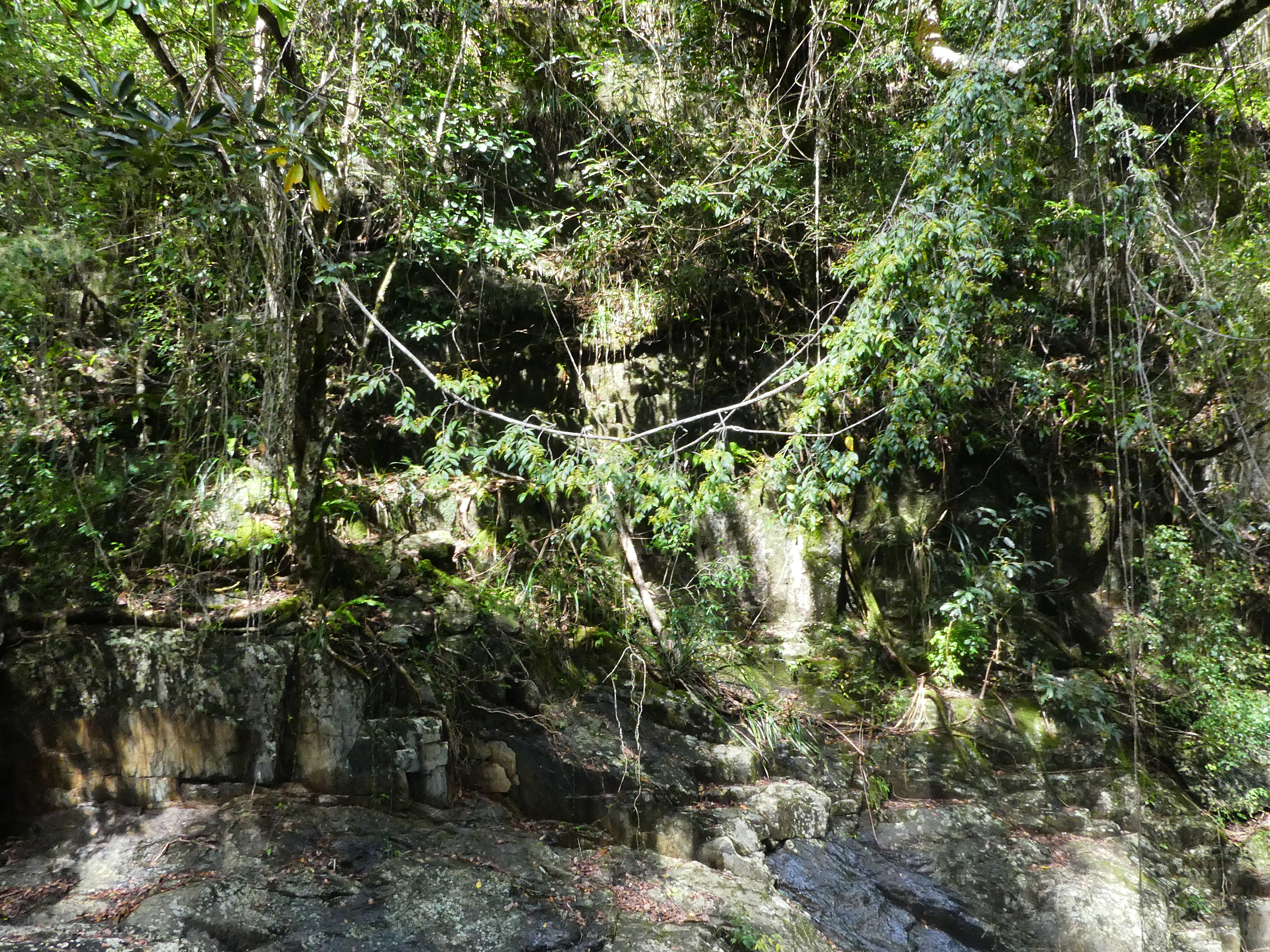
Dangling over Freshwater Creek near Cairns

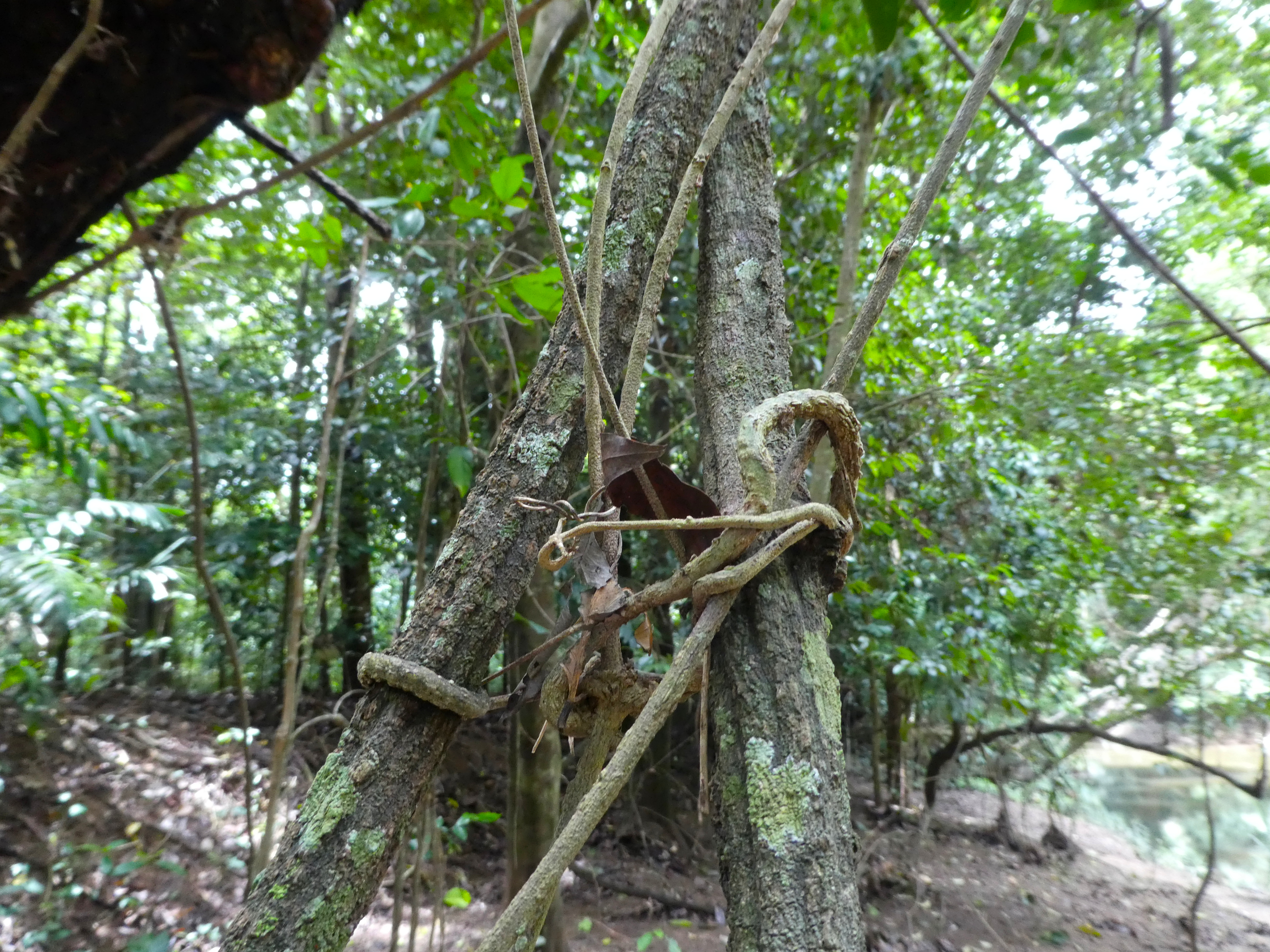
Two stems with knotted tendrils

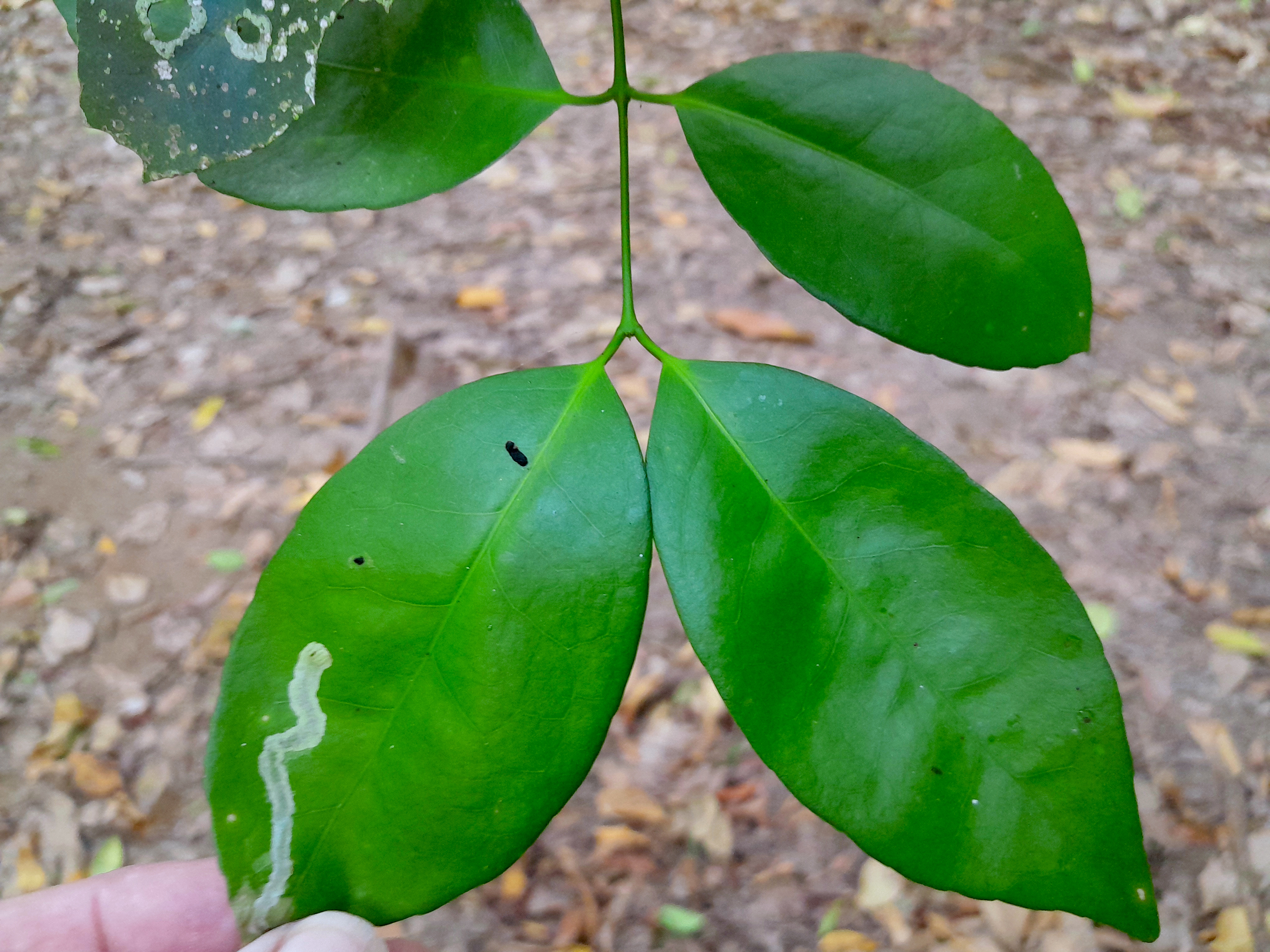
Leaves

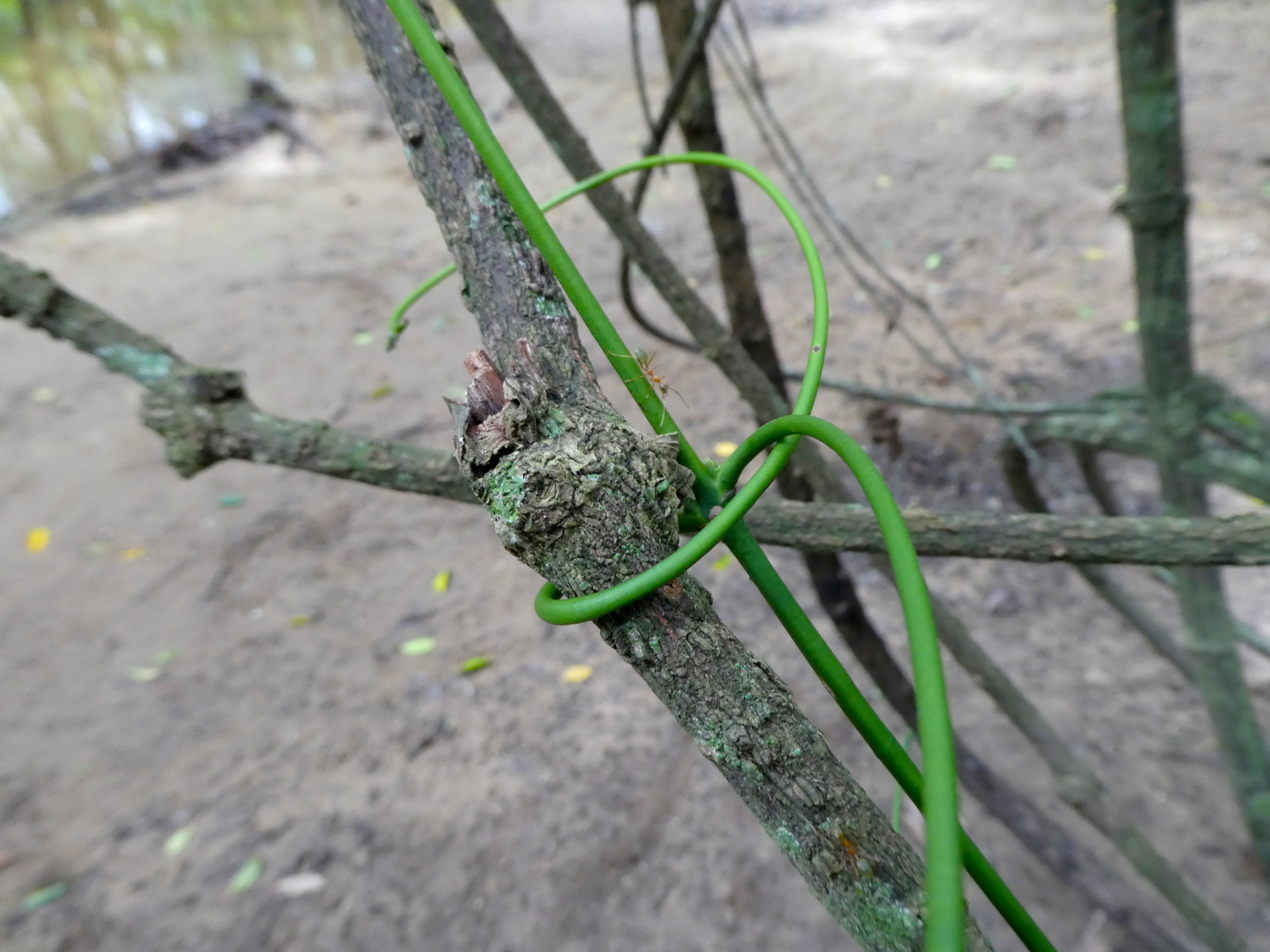
Young tendril

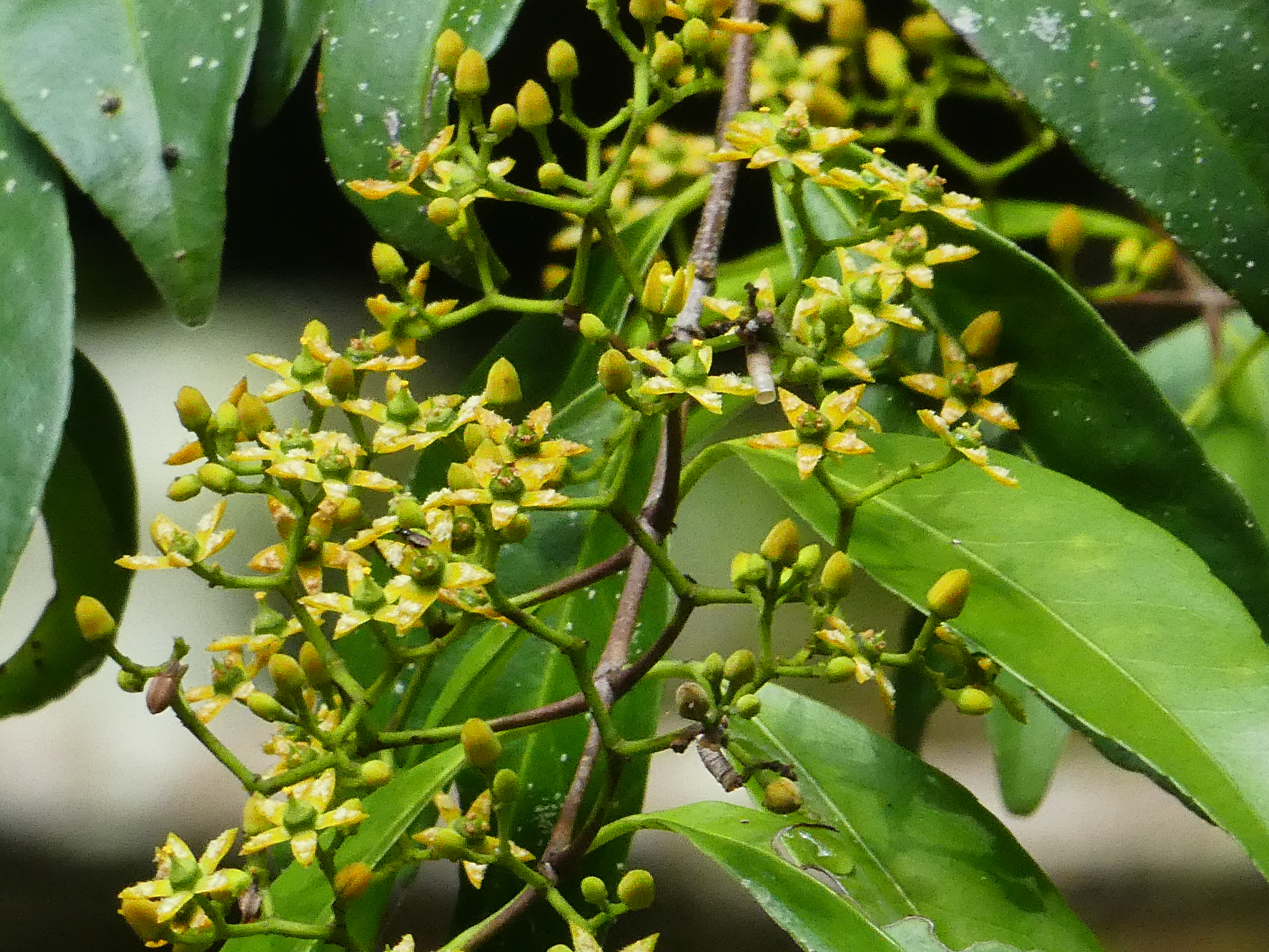
Flowers
