= Aframomum longipetiolatum =

Scientific classification
- Kingdom: Plantae
- Clade: Tracheophytes
- Clade: Angiosperms
- Clade: Monocots
- Clade: Commelinids
- Order: Zingiberales
- Family: Zingiberaceae
- Genus: Aframomum
- Species: A. longipetiolatum

Binomial name
- Aframomum longipetiolatum Koechlin

Species of flowering plant

Aframomum longipetiolatum is a monocotyledonous plant species in the family Zingiberaceae. It is native to Gabon.
