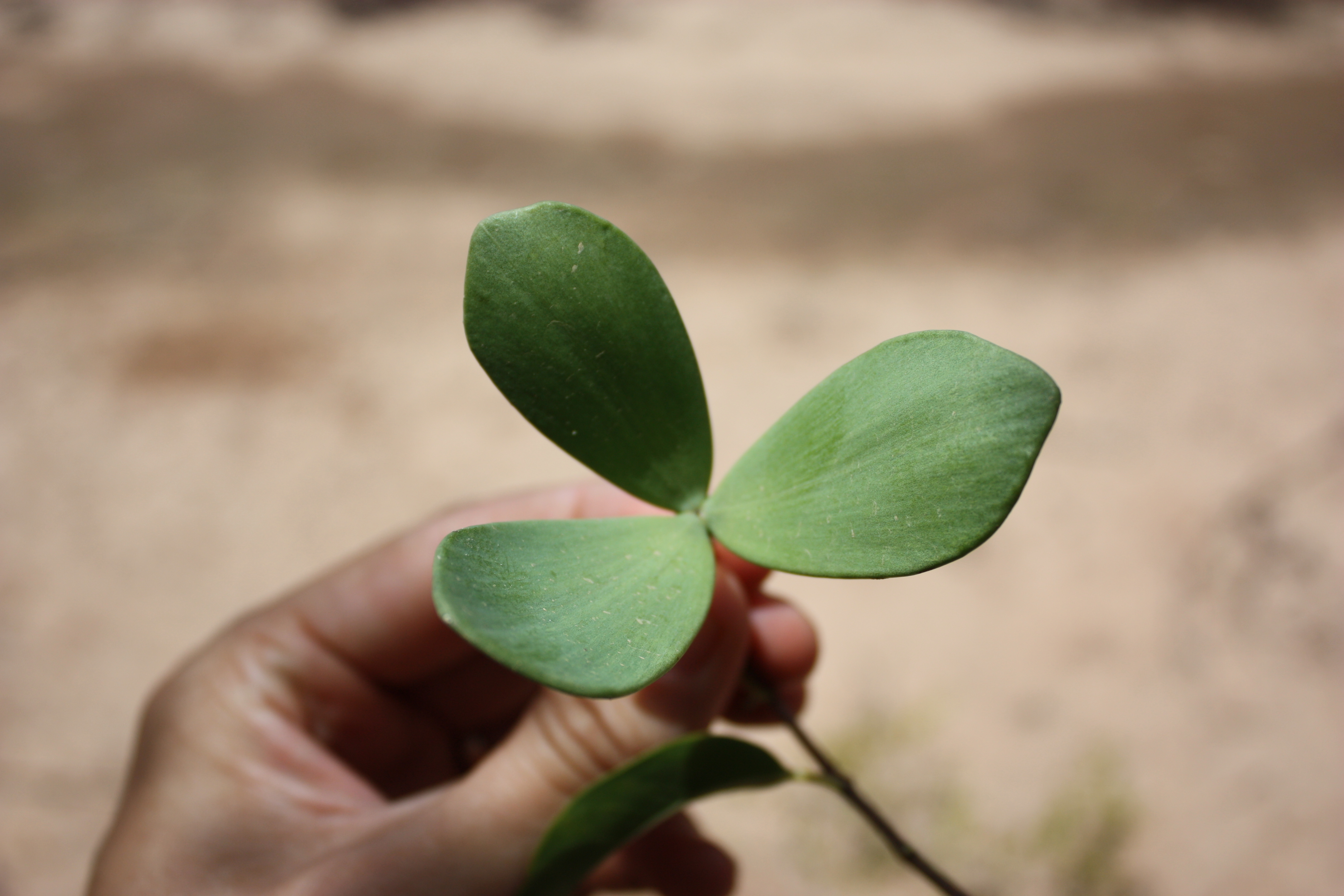
- Loeseneriella africana

Scientific classification
- Kingdom: Plantae
- Clade: Tracheophytes
- Clade: Angiosperms
- Clade: Eudicots
- Clade: Rosids
- Order: Celastrales
- Family: Celastraceae
- Genus: Loeseneriella; A.C.Sm.

= Loeseneriella =

Genus of flowering plants

Loeseneriella is a genus of flowering plants belonging to the family Celastraceae. The name is in honour of Ludwig Eduard Theodor Loesener (1865–1941), a German botanist who collected widely in the field in Germany and did much work on the Celastraceae. It was first described and published in the American Journal of Botany in 1941.

== Distribution ==
The native range of Loeseneriella is tropical and subtropical Old World, in these areas:

- Africa – Angola, Benin, Botswana, Burkina, Burundi, Cabinda, Cameroon, Caprivi Strip, Central African Republic, Chad, Congo, Equatorial Guinea, Ethiopia, Gabon, Gambia, Ghana, Guinea-Bissau, Guinea, Ivory Coast, Kenya, Liberia, Malawi, Mali, Mauritania, Mozambique, Nigeria, Niger, Northern Provinces, Rwanda, Senegal, Sierre Leone, Somalia, Sudan, Tanzania, Togo, Uganda, Zambia, Zaïre, Zimbabwe; also the islands of Comoros and Madagascar
- Indian subcontinent – Assam, Bangladesh, India, Sri Lanka
- Indo-China – Andaman Is., Cambodia, Laos, Myanmar, Nicobar Is., Thailand, Vietnam
- East Asia – China South-Central, China Southeast, Hainan,
- Malesia – Borneo, Jawa, Lesser Sunda Is., Malaya, Maluku, Philippines, Sulawesi, Sumatera
- Papuasia – Bismarck Archipelago, New Guinea, Solomon Is.
- Australia – New South Wales, Queensland
- Western Pacific – Caroline Is., Vanuatu

== Accepted species ==
As of November 2024, Plants of the World Online accepts the following 29 species:

- Loeseneriella africana (Willd.) R.Wilczek
- Loeseneriella andamanica (King) H.B.Naithani & S.Biswas
- Loeseneriella apiculata (Welw. ex Oliv.) R.Wilczek
- Loeseneriella apocynoides (Welw. ex Oliv.) N.Hallé ex J.Raynal
- Loeseneriella barbata (F.Muell.) C.T.White
- Loeseneriella bourdillonii (Gamble) D.C.S.Raju
- Loeseneriella camerunica (Loes.) N.Hallé
- Loeseneriella chesseana (Pierre) Tardieu
- Loeseneriella clematoides (Loes.) R.Wilczek
- Loeseneriella concinna A.C.Sm.
- Loeseneriella crenata (Klotzsch) R.Wilczek
- Loeseneriella cumingii (M.A.Lawson) Ding Hou
- Loeseneriella dinhensis (Pierre) A.C.Sm.
- Loeseneriella ectypopetala N.Hallé
- Loeseneriella griseoramula S.Y.Pao
- Loeseneriella iotricha (Loes. ex Fritsch) N.Hallé
- Loeseneriella lenticellata S.Y.Bao
- Loeseneriella macrantha (Korth.) A.C.Sm.
- Loeseneriella merrilliana A.C.Sm.
- Loeseneriella nicobarica (Kurz) H.B.Naithani & S.Biswas
- Loeseneriella parkinsonii (Chakrab. & M.Gangop.) B.D.Naithani
- Loeseneriella pauciflora (DC.) A.C.Sm.
- Loeseneriella rowlandii (Loes.) N.Hallé
- Loeseneriella rubiginosa (H.Perrier) N.Hallé
- Loeseneriella serrata (Griff.) A.C.Sm.
- Loeseneriella sogerensis (Baker f.) A.C.Sm.
- Loeseneriella urceolus (Tul.) N.Hallé
- Loeseneriella yaundina (Loes.) N.Hallé ex R.Wilczek
- Loeseneriella yunnanensis (Hu) A.C.Sm.
