= Aframomum thonneri =

Conservation status
- Least Concern (IUCN 3.1)

Scientific classification
- Kingdom: Plantae
- Clade: Tracheophytes
- Clade: Angiosperms
- Clade: Monocots
- Clade: Commelinids
- Order: Zingiberales
- Family: Zingiberaceae
- Genus: Aframomum
- Species: A. thonneri

Binomial name
- Aframomum thonneri De Wild.

Species of flowering plant

Aframomum thonneri is a species of plant in the ginger family, Zingiberaceae. It was first described by Émile Auguste Joseph De Wildeman.

== Range ==
Aframomum thonneri is native to the Democratic Republic of the Congo.
