= Aframomum geocarpum =

Scientific classification
- Kingdom: Plantae
- Clade: Tracheophytes
- Clade: Angiosperms
- Clade: Monocots
- Clade: Commelinids
- Order: Zingiberales
- Family: Zingiberaceae
- Genus: Aframomum
- Species: A. geocarpum

Binomial name
- Aframomum geocarpum Lock & J.B.Hall

Species of flowering plant

Aframomum geocarpum is a species in the ginger family, Zingiberaceae. It was first described by John Michael Lock and J.B. Hall.

== Range ==
Aframomum geocarpum is native to West Africa, from Sierra Leone to Ghana.
