= Aframomum elegans =

Scientific classification
- Kingdom: Plantae
- Clade: Tracheophytes
- Clade: Angiosperms
- Clade: Monocots
- Clade: Commelinids
- Order: Zingiberales
- Family: Zingiberaceae
- Genus: Aframomum
- Species: A. elegans

Binomial name
- Aframomum elegans Lock

Species of flowering plant

Aframomum elegans is a species in the ginger family, Zingiberaceae. It is found in Liberia.
