= Aframomum giganteum =

Scientific classification
- Kingdom: Plantae
- Clade: Tracheophytes
- Clade: Angiosperms
- Clade: Monocots
- Clade: Commelinids
- Order: Zingiberales
- Family: Zingiberaceae
- Genus: Aframomum
- Species: A. giganteum

Binomial name
- Aframomum giganteum K.Schum.

Species of flowering plant

Aframomum giganteum is a species of plant in the ginger family, Zingiberaceae. It was described by Daniel Oliver and D.Hanb. and got its current name from Karl Moritz Schumann.
