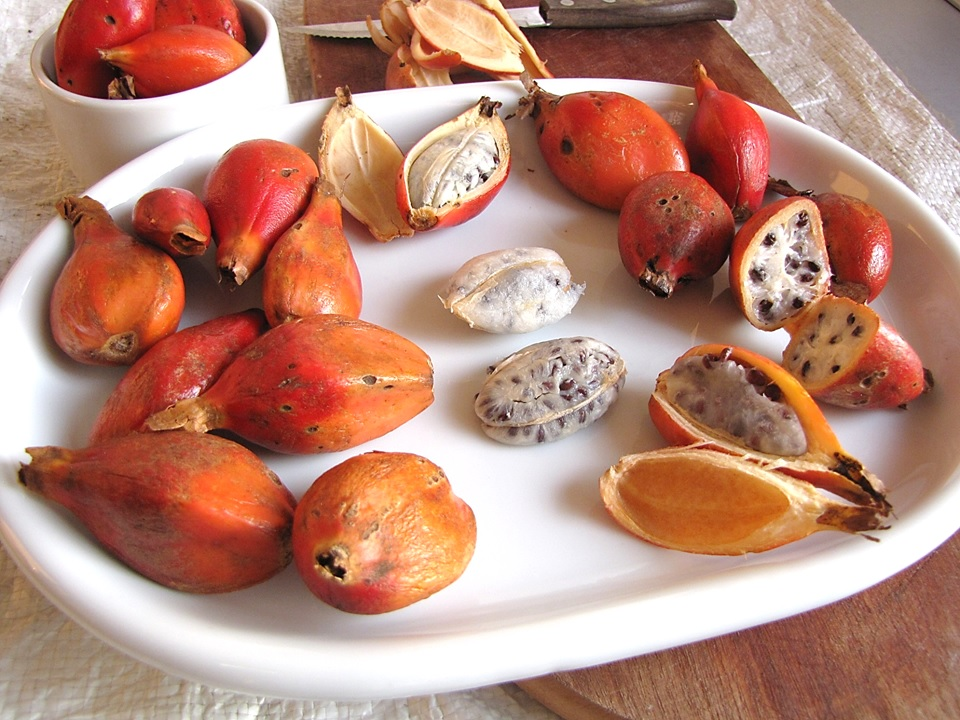
- Fruit

Scientific classification
- Kingdom: Plantae
- Clade: Tracheophytes
- Clade: Angiosperms
- Clade: Monocots
- Clade: Commelinids
- Order: Zingiberales
- Family: Zingiberaceae
- Genus: Aframomum
- Species: A. alboviolaceum

Binomial name
- Aframomum alboviolaceum (Ridl.) K.Schum.

= Aframomum alboviolaceum =

Species of plant

Aframomum alboviolaceum is a monocotyledonous plant species that was first described by Henry Nicholas Ridley, and got its current name from Karl Moritz Schumann. Aframomum alboviolaceum is part of the genus Aframomum and the family Zingiberaceae. No subspecies are listed in the Catalog of Life.
