= Aframomum letestuanum =

Conservation status
- Least Concern (IUCN 3.1)

Scientific classification
- Kingdom: Plantae
- Clade: Tracheophytes
- Clade: Angiosperms
- Clade: Monocots
- Clade: Commelinids
- Order: Zingiberales
- Family: Zingiberaceae
- Genus: Aframomum
- Species: A. letestuanum

Binomial name
- Aframomum letestuanum Gagnep.

Synonyms
- Aframomum pruinosum Gagnep.

Species of flowering plant

Aframomum letestuanum is a species of plant in the ginger family, Zingiberaceae. It was first described by François Gagnepain.
