= Aframomum laurentii =

Scientific classification
- Kingdom: Plantae
- Clade: Tracheophytes
- Clade: Angiosperms
- Clade: Monocots
- Clade: Commelinids
- Order: Zingiberales
- Family: Zingiberaceae
- Genus: Aframomum
- Species: A. laurentii

Binomial name
- Aframomum laurentii (De Wild. & T.Durand) K.Schum.

Species of flowering plant

Aframomum laurentii is a species of plant in the ginger family, Zingiberaceae. It was first described by Émile Auguste Joseph De Wildeman and Théophile Alexis Durand, and got its current name from Karl Moritz Schumann.

== Range ==
Aframomum laurentii is native to the Democratic Republic of the Congo.
