= Aframomum spiroligulatum =

Scientific classification
- Kingdom: Plantae
- Clade: Tracheophytes
- Clade: Angiosperms
- Clade: Monocots
- Clade: Commelinids
- Order: Zingiberales
- Family: Zingiberaceae
- Genus: Aframomum
- Species: A. spiroligulatum

Binomial name
- Aframomum spiroligulatum A.D.Poulsen & Lock

Species of flowering plant

Aframomum spiroligulatum is a species of plant in the ginger family, Zingiberaceae. It was first described by John Michael Lock and Axel Dalberg Poulsen.

== Range ==
Aframomum spiroligulatum is native from Southwest Uganda to Southwest Rwanda.
