= Aframomum flavum =

Scientific classification
- Kingdom: Plantae
- Clade: Tracheophytes
- Clade: Angiosperms
- Clade: Monocots
- Clade: Commelinids
- Order: Zingiberales
- Family: Zingiberaceae
- Genus: Aframomum
- Species: A. flavum

Binomial name
- Aframomum flavum Lock

Species of flowering plant

Aframomum flavum is a species in the ginger family, Zingiberaceae. It was first described by John Michael Lock.
