= Aframomum albiflorum =

Scientific classification
- Kingdom: Plantae
- Clade: Tracheophytes
- Clade: Angiosperms
- Clade: Monocots
- Clade: Commelinids
- Order: Zingiberales
- Family: Zingiberaceae
- Genus: Aframomum
- Species: A. albiflorum

Binomial name
- Aframomum albiflorum Lock

Species of flowering plant

Aframomum albiflorum is a monocotyledonous plant species in the family Zingiberaceae.
