= Aframomum longiscapum =

Scientific classification
- Kingdom: Plantae
- Clade: Tracheophytes
- Clade: Angiosperms
- Clade: Monocots
- Clade: Commelinids
- Order: Zingiberales
- Family: Zingiberaceae
- Genus: Aframomum
- Species: A. longiscapum

Binomial name
- Aframomum longiscapum K.Schum.

Synonyms
- Amomum longiscapum

Species of flowering plant

Aframomum longiscapum is a species of plant in the ginger family, Zingiberaceae. It was first described by Joseph Dalton Hooker and got its current name from Karl Moritz Schumann.

== Range ==
Aframomum longiscapum is native to Western Tropical Africa.
