= Aframomum mannii =

Scientific classification
- Kingdom: Plantae
- Clade: Tracheophytes
- Clade: Angiosperms
- Clade: Monocots
- Clade: Commelinids
- Order: Zingiberales
- Family: Zingiberaceae
- Genus: Aframomum
- Species: A. mannii

Binomial name
- Aframomum mannii (Oliv. & D.Hanb.) K.Schum.

Species of flowering plant from ginger family

Aframomum mannii is a species of plant in the ginger family, Zingiberaceae. It was first described by Daniel Oliver and D.Hanb. and got its current name from Karl Moritz Schumann.

== Range ==
Aframomum mannii is native to Gabon.
