= Aframomum verrucosum =

Scientific classification
- Kingdom: Plantae
- Clade: Tracheophytes
- Clade: Angiosperms
- Clade: Monocots
- Clade: Commelinids
- Order: Zingiberales
- Family: Zingiberaceae
- Genus: Aframomum
- Species: A. verrucosum

Binomial name
- Aframomum verrucosum Lock

Species of flowering plant

Aframomum verrucosum is a species in the ginger family, Zingiberaceae. It was first described by John Michael Lock.

== Range ==
Aframomum verrucosum is native from West Central Tropical Africa to Western Kenya.
