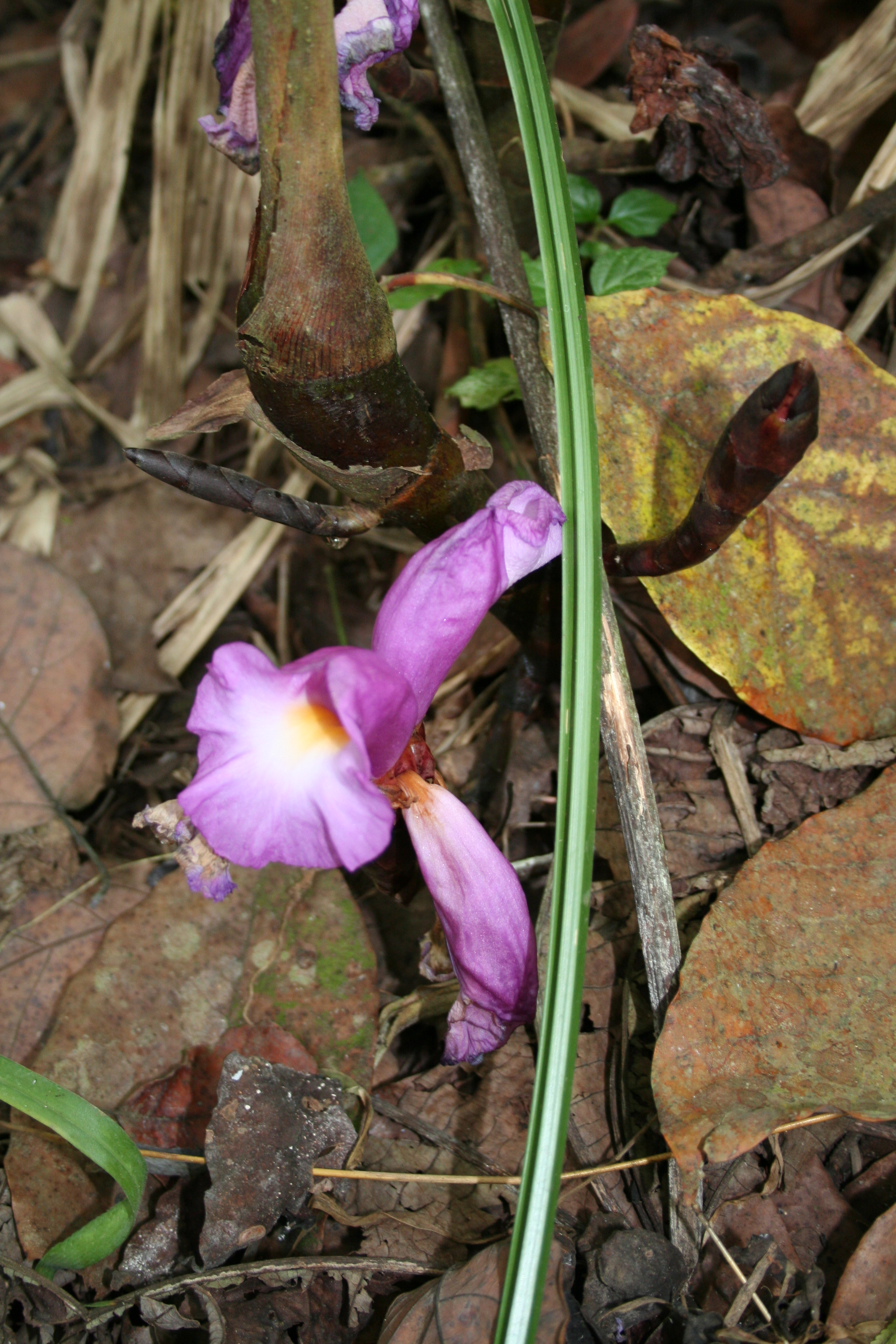
- Unidentified Aframomum in flower
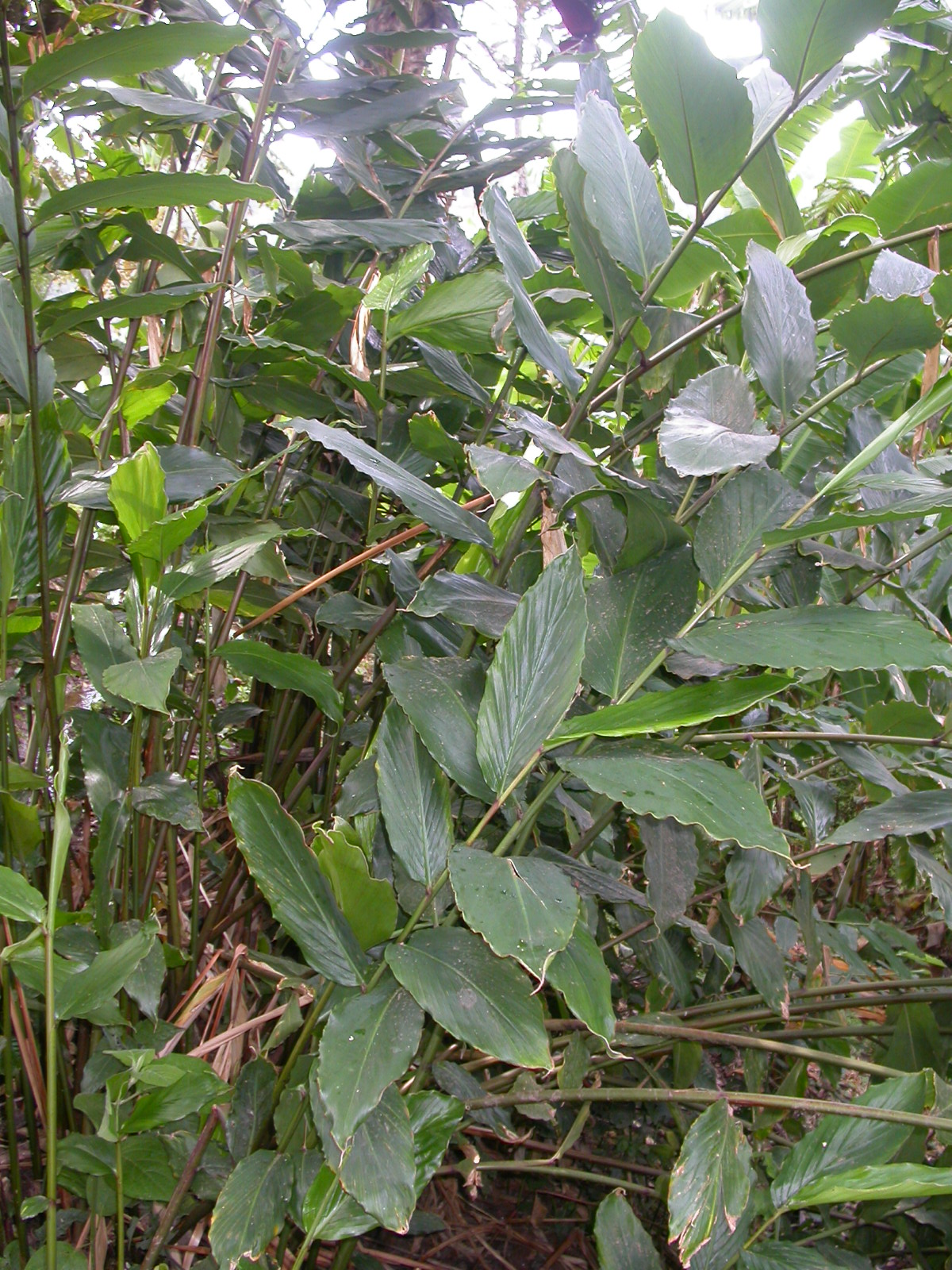
- The nangawo (Aframomum zambesiacum)

Scientific classification
- Kingdom: Plantae
- Clade: Tracheophytes
- Clade: Angiosperms
- Clade: Monocots
- Clade: Commelinids
- Order: Zingiberales
- Family: Zingiberaceae
- Subfamily: Alpinioideae
- Tribe: Alpinieae
- Genus: Aframomum; K.Schum

Synonyms
- Alexis Salisb., without description; Marogna Salisb., without description

= Aframomum =

Genus of flowering plants

Aframomum is a genus of flowering plants in the ginger family, Zingiberaceae. It is widespread across tropical Africa as well as on some islands of the Indian Ocean (Madagascar, Seychelles, and Mauritius). It is represented by approximately 50 species. Its species are perennials and produce colorful flowers. Several aromatic species with essential oils present in fruits, seeds, leaves, stems, rhizomes, and other plant parts are either edible or used as medicine in Africa.

Aframomum melegueta (Melegueta pepper) is an economically important edible crop in West Africa.

== Species ==
Species are:

- Aframomum albiflorum Lock
- Aframomum alboviolaceum (Ridl.) K.Schum.
- Aframomum alpinum (Gagnep.) K.Schum.
- Aframomum amaniense Loes.
- Aframomum angustifolium (Sonn.) K.Schum.
- Aframomum arundinaceum (Oliv. & D.Hanb.) K.Schum.
- Aframomum atewae Lock & J.B.Hall
- Aframomum aulacocarpos Pellegr. ex Koechlin
- Aframomum cereum (Hook.f.) K.Schum.
- Aframomum chrysanthum Lock
- Aframomum citratum (C.Pereira) K.Schum.
- Aframomum colosseum K.Schum.
- Aframomum cordifolium Lock & J.B.Hall
- Aframomum corrorima (A.Braun) P.C.M.Jansen ‑ korima
- Aframomum daniellii (Hook.f.) K.Schum.
- Aframomum elegans Lock
- Aframomum elliottii (Baker) K.Schum.
- Aframomum exscapum (Sims) Hepper
- Aframomum flavum Lock
- Aframomum geocarpum Lock & J.B.Hall
- Aframomum giganteum (Oliv. & D.Hanb.) K.Schum.
- Aframomum kayserianum (K.Schum.) K.Schum.
- Aframomum laurentii (De Wild. & T.Durand) K.Schum.
- Aframomum laxiflorum Loes. ex Lock
- Aframomum leptolepis (K.Schum.) K.Schum.
- Aframomum letestuanum Gagnep.
- Aframomum limbatum (Oliv. & D.Hanb.) K.Schum.
- Aframomum longiligulatum Koechlin
- Aframomum longipetiolatum Koechlin
- Aframomum longiscapum (Hook.f.) K.Schum.
- Aframomum luteoalbum (K.Schum.) K.Schum.
- Aframomum makandensis Dhetchuvi
- Aframomum mala (K.Schum. ex Engl.) K.Schum.
- Aframomum mannii (Oliv. & D.Hanb.) K.Schum.
- Aframomum melegueta K.Schum ‑ grains of paradise
- Aframomum mildbraedii Loes.
- Aframomum orientale Lock
- Aframomum pilosum (Oliv. & D.Hanb.) K.Schum.
- Aframomum polyanthum (K.Schum.) K.Schum.
- Aframomum pruinosum Gagnep.
- Aframomum pseudostipulare Loes. & Mildbr. ex Koechlin
- Aframomum rostratum K.Schum.
- Aframomum sceleratum A.Chev.
- Aframomum sericeum Dhetchuvi & D.J.Harris
- Aframomum singulariflorum Dhetchuvi
- Aframomum spiroligulatum A.D.Poulsen & Lock
- Aframomum stanfieldii Hepper
- Aframomum strobilaceum (Sm.) Hepper
- Aframomum subsericeum (Oliv. & D.Hanb.) K.Schum.
- Aframomum sulcatum (Oliv. & D.Hanb. ex Baker) K.Schum.
- Aframomum thonneri De Wild.
- Aframomum uniflorum A.D.Poulsen & Lock
- Aframomum verrucosum Lock
- Aframomum wuerthii Dhetchuvi & Eb.Fisch.
- Aframomum zambesiacum (Baker) K.Schum. ‑ nangawo

== See also ==
- Amomum
