= Aframomum mala =

Scientific classification
- Kingdom: Plantae
- Clade: Tracheophytes
- Clade: Angiosperms
- Clade: Monocots
- Clade: Commelinids
- Order: Zingiberales
- Family: Zingiberaceae
- Genus: Aframomum
- Species: A. mala

Binomial name
- Aframomum mala (K.Schum. ex Engl.) K.Schum.

Species of flowering plant in the ginger family

Aframomum mala is a species of flowering plant in the ginger family, Zingiberaceae. It was first described by Karl Moritz Schumann and Adolf Engler, and was given its current name by Karl Moritz Schumann. It is a rhizomatous geophyte native to Tanzania.
