= Aframomum subsericeum =

Scientific classification
- Kingdom: Plantae
- Clade: Tracheophytes
- Clade: Angiosperms
- Clade: Monocots
- Clade: Commelinids
- Order: Zingiberales
- Family: Zingiberaceae
- Genus: Aframomum
- Species: A. subsericeum

Binomial name
- Aframomum subsericeum (Oliv. & D.Hanb.) K.Schum.

Species of flowering plant in the ginger family

Aframomum subsericeum is a species of plant in the ginger family, Zingiberaceae. It was first described by Daniel Oliver and Daniel Hanbury and renamed by Karl Moritz Schumann.

The species is divided into the following subspecies:

- A. s. Glaucophyllum
- A. s. Subsericeum
