= Aframomum orientale =

Scientific classification
- Kingdom: Plantae
- Clade: Tracheophytes
- Clade: Angiosperms
- Clade: Monocots
- Clade: Commelinids
- Order: Zingiberales
- Family: Zingiberaceae
- Genus: Aframomum
- Species: A. orientale

Binomial name
- Aframomum orientale Lock

Endangered species of plant

Aframomum orientale is a species in the ginger family, Zingiberaceae. It was first described by John Michael Lock. It is listed as endangered by IUCN.

== Range ==
The native range of Aframomum orientale is from Southeast Kenya to East Tanzania.
