= Aframomum atewae =

Scientific classification
- Kingdom: Plantae
- Clade: Tracheophytes
- Clade: Angiosperms
- Clade: Monocots
- Clade: Commelinids
- Order: Zingiberales
- Family: Zingiberaceae
- Genus: Aframomum
- Species: A. atewae

Binomial name
- Aframomum atewae Lock & J.B.Hall

Species of flowering plant

Aframomum atewae is a monocotyledonous plant species described by John Michael Lock and J.B. Hall. Aframomum atewae is part of the genus Aframomum and the family Zingiberaceae.

The species' range is in Ghana. No subspecies are listed in the Catalog of Life.
