= Aframomum uniflorum =

Scientific classification
- Kingdom: Plantae
- Clade: Tracheophytes
- Clade: Angiosperms
- Clade: Monocots
- Clade: Commelinids
- Order: Zingiberales
- Family: Zingiberaceae
- Genus: Aframomum
- Species: A. uniflorum

Binomial name
- Aframomum uniflorum A.D.Poulsen & Lock

Species of flowering plant

Aframomum uniflorum is a species in the ginger family, Zingiberaceae. It was first described by John Michael Lock and Axel Dalberg Poulsen.

== Range ==
Aframomum uniflorum is native to Tropical Africa, From Northeast Democratic Republic of the Congo to Uganda.
