= Aframomum chrysanthum =

Scientific classification
- Kingdom: Plantae
- Clade: Tracheophytes
- Clade: Angiosperms
- Clade: Monocots
- Clade: Commelinids
- Order: Zingiberales
- Family: Zingiberaceae
- Genus: Aframomum
- Species: A. chrysanthum

Binomial name
- Aframomum chrysanthum Lock

Species of plant

Aframomum chrysanthum is a monocotyledonous plant species the family Zingiberaceae first described by John Michael Lock.
