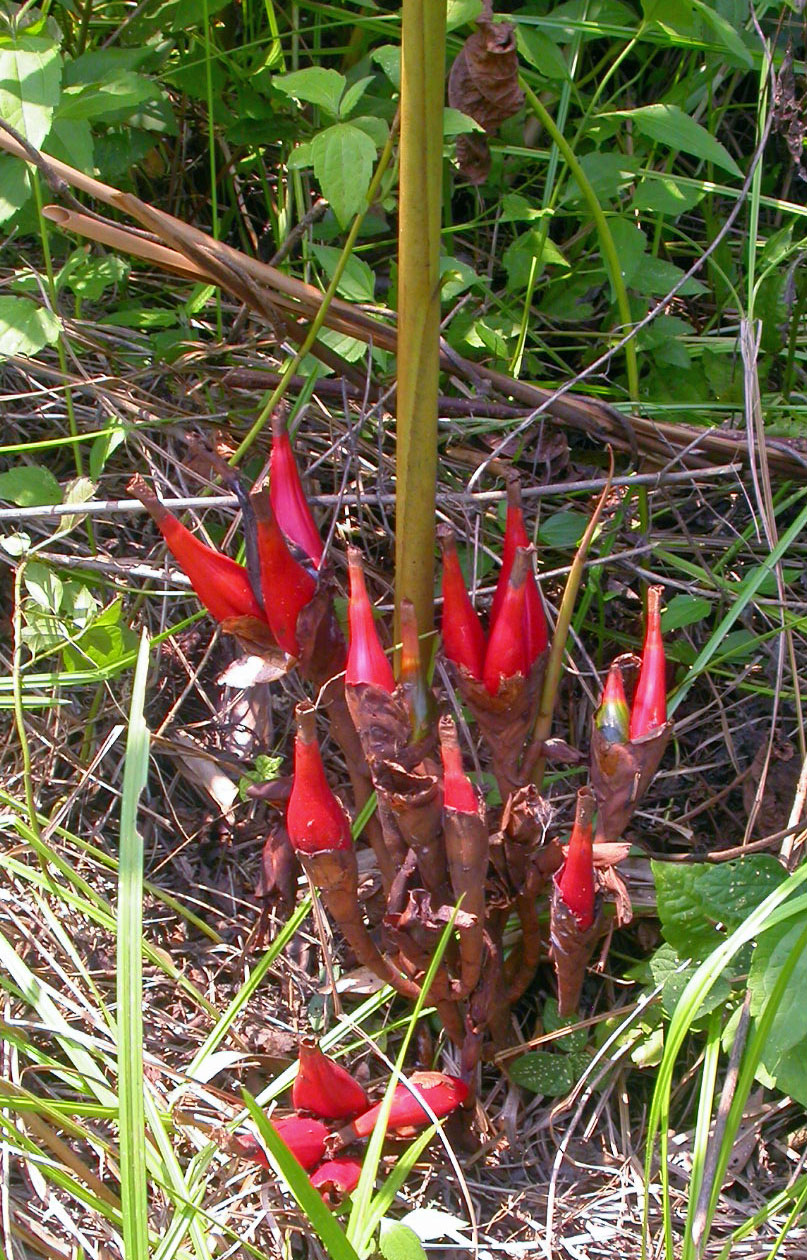
- Aframomum angustifolium fruit

Scientific classification
- Kingdom: Plantae
- Clade: Tracheophytes
- Clade: Angiosperms
- Clade: Monocots
- Clade: Commelinids
- Order: Zingiberales
- Family: Zingiberaceae
- Genus: Aframomum
- Species: A. angustifolium

Binomial name
- Aframomum angustifolium (Sonn.) K.Schum.
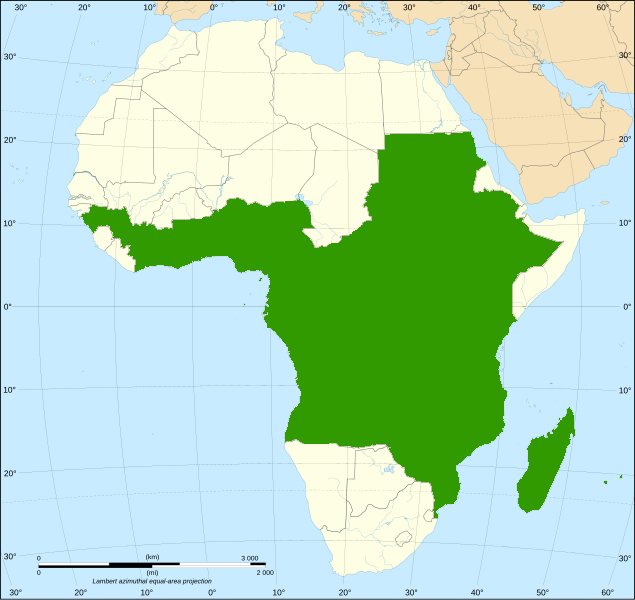

Synonyms
- Aframomum baumannii K.Schum.; Aframomum sanguineum (K.Schum.) K.Schum.; Aframomum sceleratum A.Chev.; Amomum angustifolium Sonn.; Amomum clusii Sm.; Amomum madagascariense Lam.; Amomum nemorosum Bojer; Amomum sanguineum K.Schum.; Amomum sansibaricum Werth; Cardamomum angustifolium (Sonn.) Kuntze; Cardamomum clusii (Sm.) Kuntze; Cardamomum melegueta Kuntze; Marogna paludosa Salisb.; Zingiber meleguetta Gaertn.

= Aframomum angustifolium =

Wild cardamom

Aframomum angustifolium, known as longoza (Malagasy pronunciation: [luŋguza], also "wild cardamom" in English) is a species in the ginger family Zingiberaceae that grows in tropical Africa and in Madagascar.

== Description ==
Aframomum angustifolium is herbaceous and like other plants of this family, its erect "stems" consist of layered tubular leaf bases. The fruit is a berry containing many seeds surrounded by sugary-sweet and sour edible pulp.

== Etymology ==
The species name, angustifolium, means "narrow-leaved" in Latin.

Malagasy people know it as a source of energy during long hunting treks (hence from Malagasy lona "long hours", and hoza "to experience diificulties").

== Uses ==
The plant's crushed seeds are used as a peppery spice. The leaves are also used as disposable receptacles for eating rice.
