= Aframomum cereum =

Scientific classification
- Kingdom: Plantae
- Clade: Tracheophytes
- Clade: Angiosperms
- Clade: Monocots
- Clade: Commelinids
- Order: Zingiberales
- Family: Zingiberaceae
- Genus: Aframomum
- Species: A. cereum

Binomial name
- Aframomum cereum (Hook.f.) K.Schum.

Synonyms
- Aframomum masuianum (De Wild. & T.Durand) K.Schum.; Aframomum sceptrum (Oliv. & D.Hanb.) K.Schum.; Amomum cereum Hook.f.; Amomum masuianum De Wild. & T.Durand; Amomum sceptrum Oliv. & D.Hanb.; Cardamomum cereum (Hook.f.) Kuntze Cardamomum sceptrum; (Oliv. & D.Hanb.) Kuntze Ceratanthera beaumetzii; Heckel

Species of flowering plant

Aframomum cereum is a monocotyledonous plant species in the family Zingiberaceae that was first described by Joseph Dalton Hooker, and got its current name from Karl Moritz Schumann.
