= Aframomum luteoalbum =

Scientific classification
- Kingdom: Plantae
- Clade: Tracheophytes
- Clade: Angiosperms
- Clade: Monocots
- Clade: Commelinids
- Order: Zingiberales
- Family: Zingiberaceae
- Genus: Aframomum
- Species: A. luteoalbum

Binomial name
- Aframomum luteoalbum K.Schum.

Synonyms
- Amomum luteoalbum

Species of flowering plant

Aframomum luteoalbum is a species of plant in the ginger family, Zingiberaceae. It was first described by Karl Moritz Schumann.

== Range ==
Aframomum luteoalbum is native from Southwest South Sudan to Northwest Tanzania.
