= Aframomum singulariflorum =

Scientific classification
- Kingdom: Plantae
- Clade: Tracheophytes
- Clade: Angiosperms
- Clade: Monocots
- Clade: Commelinids
- Order: Zingiberales
- Family: Zingiberaceae
- Genus: Aframomum
- Species: A. singulariflorum

Binomial name
- Aframomum singulariflorum Dhetchuvi

Species of flowering plant

Aframomum singulariflorum is a species in the ginger family, Zingiberaceae. It was first described by Dhetchuvi in 1993.

== Range ==
The species' range is the Democratic Republic of the Congo.
