= Aframomum alpinum =

Conservation status
- Vulnerable (IUCN 3.1)

Scientific classification
- Kingdom: Plantae
- Clade: Tracheophytes
- Clade: Angiosperms
- Clade: Monocots
- Clade: Commelinids
- Order: Zingiberales
- Family: Zingiberaceae
- Genus: Aframomum
- Species: A. alpinum

Binomial name
- Aframomum alpinum (Gagnep.) K.Schum.

Synonyms
- Amomum alpinum Gagnep.; Aframomum zimmermannii K.Schum.

Species of plant

Aframomum alpinum is a monocotyledonous plant species that was first described by François Gagnepain, and given its current name by Karl Moritz Schumann. Aframomum alpinum is part of the genus Aframomum and the family Zingiberaceae.

== Range ==
The species is found in the undergrowth of montane forest from 1200 to 1700 meters in Tanzania.
