= Aframomum pilosum =

Scientific classification
- Kingdom: Plantae
- Clade: Tracheophytes
- Clade: Angiosperms
- Clade: Monocots
- Clade: Commelinids
- Order: Zingiberales
- Family: Zingiberaceae
- Genus: Aframomum
- Species: A. pilosum

Binomial name
- Aframomum pilosum (Oliv. & D.Hanb.) K.Schum.

Species of flowering plant in the ginger family

Aframomum pilosum is a species of plant in the ginger family, Zingiberaceae. It was first described by Daniel Oliver and Daniel Hanbury and got its current name from Karl Moritz Schumann.
