= Aframomum kayserianum =

Scientific classification
- Kingdom: Plantae
- Clade: Tracheophytes
- Clade: Angiosperms
- Clade: Monocots
- Clade: Commelinids
- Order: Zingiberales
- Family: Zingiberaceae
- Genus: Aframomum
- Species: A. kayserianum

Binomial name
- Aframomum kayserianum K.Schum.

Synonyms
- Amomum kayserianum

Species of flowering plant

Aframomum kayserianum is a species of plant in the ginger family, Zingiberaceae. It was first described by Karl Moritz Schumann.

== Range ==
Aframomum kayserianum is native to Cameroon and Nigeria.
