= Aframomum makandensis =

Scientific classification
- Kingdom: Plantae
- Clade: Tracheophytes
- Clade: Angiosperms
- Clade: Monocots
- Clade: Commelinids
- Order: Zingiberales
- Family: Zingiberaceae
- Genus: Aframomum
- Species: A. makandensis

Binomial name
- Aframomum makandensis Dhetchuvi

Species of flowering plant in the ginger family

Aframomum makandensis is a species of plant in the ginger family, Zingiberaceae. It was first described by Dhetchuvi.

== Range ==
Aframomum makandensis is native to Gabon.
