= Aframomum sulcatum =

Scientific classification
- Kingdom: Plantae
- Clade: Tracheophytes
- Clade: Angiosperms
- Clade: Monocots
- Clade: Commelinids
- Order: Zingiberales
- Family: Zingiberaceae
- Genus: Aframomum
- Species: A. sulcatum

Binomial name
- Aframomum sulcatum (Oliv. & D.Hanb. ex Baker) K.Schum.

Species of flowering plant in the ginger family

Aframomum sulcatum is a species of plant in the ginger family, Zingiberaceae. It was first described by Daniel Oliver, Daniel Hanbury, and John Gilbert Baker and got its current name from Karl Moritz Schumann.
