= Aframomum sericeum =

Scientific classification
- Kingdom: Plantae
- Clade: Tracheophytes
- Clade: Angiosperms
- Clade: Monocots
- Clade: Commelinids
- Order: Zingiberales
- Family: Zingiberaceae
- Genus: Aframomum
- Species: A. sericeum

Binomial name
- Aframomum sericeum Dhetchuvi & D.J.Harris

Species of flowering plant in the ginger family

Aframomum sericeum is a species of plant in the ginger family, Zingiberaceae. It was first described by Jean-Baptiste Dhetchuvi and David J. Harris.

== Range ==
Aframomum sericeum is native to Gabon, Cameroon, The Democratic Republic of the Congo, the Central African Republic, and Equatorial Guinea.
