= Aframomum arundinaceum =

Scientific classification
- Kingdom: Plantae
- Clade: Tracheophytes
- Clade: Angiosperms
- Clade: Monocots
- Clade: Commelinids
- Order: Zingiberales
- Family: Zingiberaceae
- Genus: Aframomum
- Species: A. arundinaceum

Binomial name
- Aframomum arundinaceum (Oliv. & D.Hanb.) K.Schum.

Species of plant

Aframomum arundinaceum is a monocotyledonous plant species that was first described by Daniel Oliver and Daniel Hanbury. It received its current name from Karl Moritz Schumann. Aframomum arundinaceum is part of the genus Aframomum and the family Zingiberaceae. No subspecies are listed in the Catalog of Life.
