= Aframomum rostratum =

Scientific classification
- Kingdom: Plantae
- Clade: Tracheophytes
- Clade: Angiosperms
- Clade: Monocots
- Clade: Commelinids
- Order: Zingiberales
- Family: Zingiberaceae
- Genus: Aframomum
- Species: A. rostratum

Binomial name
- Aframomum rostratum K.Schum.

Species of flowering plant

Aframomum rostratum is a species in the ginger family, Zingiberaceae. It was first described by Karl Moritz Schumann.

== Range ==
Aframomum rostratum is native to Eastern Cameroon, Gabon, the Middle Congo, and Angola.
