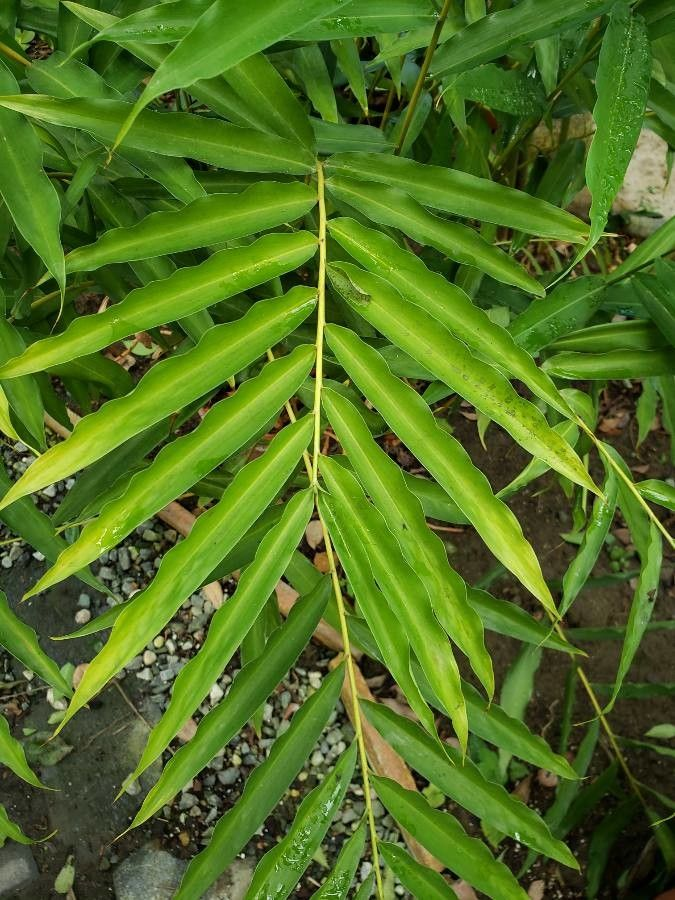

Scientific classification
- Kingdom: Plantae
- Clade: Tracheophytes
- Clade: Angiosperms
- Clade: Monocots
- Clade: Commelinids
- Order: Zingiberales
- Family: Zingiberaceae
- Genus: Aframomum
- Species: A. daniellii

Binomial name
- Aframomum daniellii K. Schum.

= Aframomum daniellii =

Species of plant

Aframomum daniellii, also known as African cardamom, is a species of flowering plant in the ginger family, Zingiberaceae. It was first described by Joseph Dalton Hooker, and got its current name from Karl Moritz Schumann.

== Range ==
Aframomum daniellii is found in West tropical Africa, from Sierra Leone to the Central African Republic, south to Angola.

== Use ==
A. daniellii is traditionally used as a spice in the regions of Africa it is native. The plant is also used for medicinal purposes as a laxative, anti-parasitic, and to fight other microbial infections.
