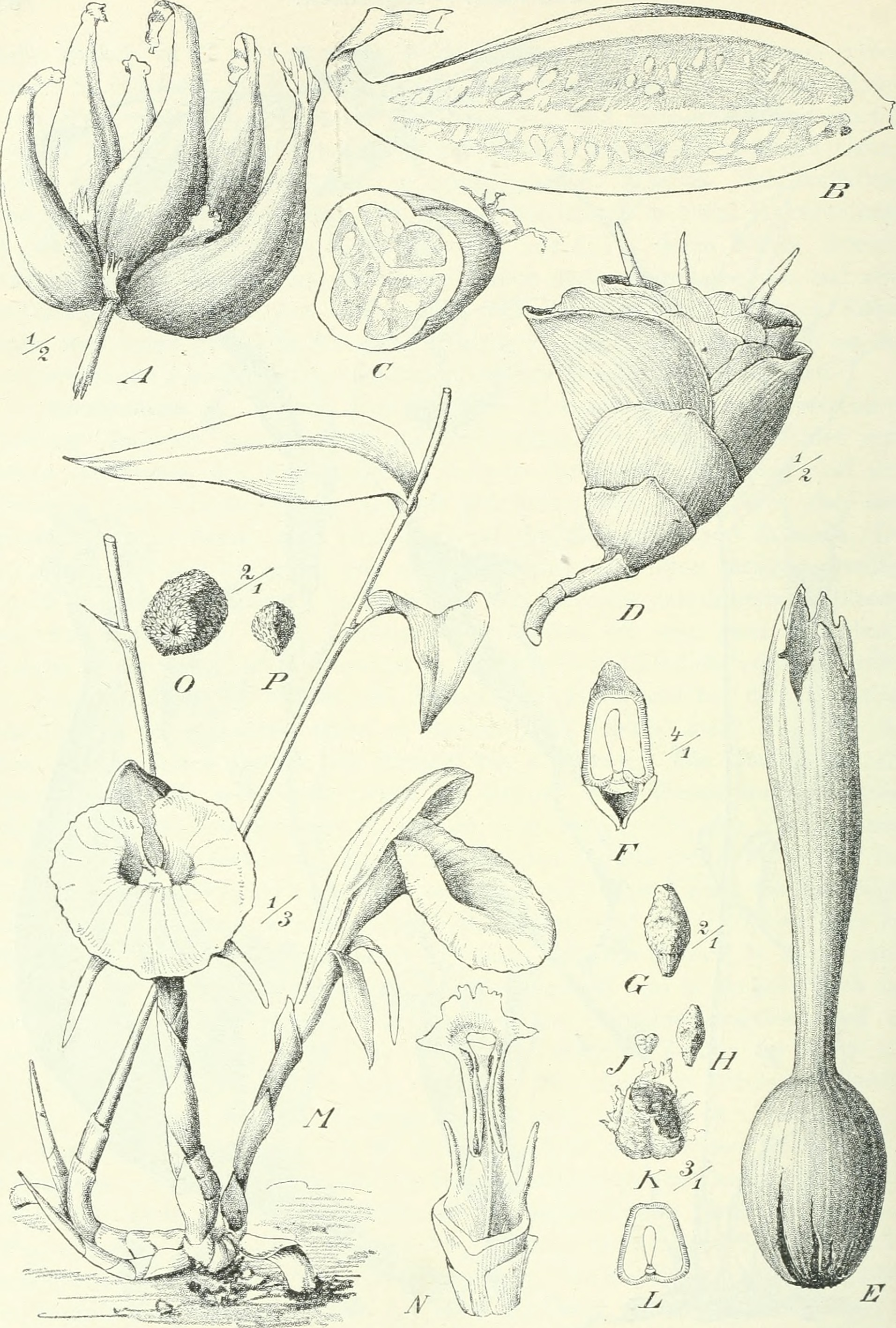
- Sketch of Aframomum citratum, right side labelled "D", 1910

Scientific classification
- Kingdom: Plantae
- Clade: Tracheophytes
- Clade: Angiosperms
- Clade: Monocots
- Clade: Commelinids
- Order: Zingiberales
- Family: Zingiberaceae
- Genus: Aframomum
- Species: A. citratum

Binomial name
- Aframomum citratum (C.Pereira) K.Schum.

= Aframomum citratum =

Species of plant

Aframomum citratum is a monocotyledonous plant species in the family Zingiberaceae that was first described by C. Pereira, and given its current name by Karl Moritz Schumann.
