= Aframomum exscapum =

Scientific classification
- Kingdom: Plantae
- Clade: Tracheophytes
- Clade: Angiosperms
- Clade: Monocots
- Clade: Commelinids
- Order: Zingiberales
- Family: Zingiberaceae
- Genus: Aframomum
- Species: A. exscapum

Binomial name
- Aframomum exscapum Hepper

Species of plant

Aframomum exscapum is a species of plant in the ginger family, Zingiberaceae. It was first described by John Sims and got its current name from Frank Nigel Hepper.

Its Susu name is dadigogo. Another name is balancounfa. It was described in 1891 by Edouard Heckel, who wrongly attributed to it the name of Ceratanthera Beaumetzi.
