= Jean Koechlin =

French botanist and hymn writer (1920–2009)

Jean Koechlin (28 August 1920 – 13 September 2009) was a French botanist and Christian hymn writer. The standard author abbreviation Koechlin is used to indicate this person as the author when citing a botanical name.

Koechlin was born on 28 August 1920 in Basel, on the river Rhine, in northwestern Switzerland. He was a lifelong Plymouth Brethren, of the Exclusive Brethren that followed a division with William Kelly in 1881.

Koechlin authored the book Flore et Végétation de Madagascar with Jean-Louis Guillaumet and Philippe Morat. It is the standard work on the vegetation of Madagascar.

Koechlin died on 13 September 2009 in Francheville, Metropolis of Lyon, region of Auvergne-Rhône-Alpes, eastern France. He was a grandson of Maurice Koechlin, structural engineer.

== Books ==
- Flore et Végétation de Madagascar, 1974 ISBN 9783904144063
- Pas de réponse à ma prière?, 1993. Valence: Bibles et publications chrétiennes.
- Qui sont les vrais adorateurs?, 2004. Ibid.
