= Frank Nigel Hepper =

English botanist (1929–2013)

F. Nigel Hepper
- Born: 13 March 1929; Leeds, West Yorkshire, England
- Died: 16 May 2013 (aged 84); Kingston upon Thames, London, England
- Known for: Phenology
- Spouse: Helen Morrish
- Children: 3
- Scientific career
- Fields: Botany
- Institutions: The Royal Botanic Gardens, Kew
- Author abbrev. (botany): Hepper

Frank Nigel Hepper FLS FIBiol (13 March 1929 – 16 May 2013) was an English botanist, best known for his work as editor of The Flora of West Tropical Africa (vols. II and III).

== Early life and education ==
Hepper was born in Leeds in 1929, living in Weetwood. During the war Hepper's family evacuated to a cottage in Cumbria and established a smallholding, an experience recounted in Hepper's book Life on a Lake District Smallholding, published shortly before his death. He attended Harecroft Hall Preparatory school, Gosforth, where he became friends with Tam Dalyell who later recalled that, even then, the young Hepper was a keen gardener and insisted on using Latin names for plants. Hepper's memoirs of his early life also include a diary account of visit to London which included a visit to Kew Gardens.

== Career ==
Following a vacation studentship at the Natural History Museum, London, where he worked on Silene nutans and again, came into contact with Kew. Hepper started work at Kew as a taxonomist in 1950, working with H. K. Airy Shaw on Bornean flora, but was soon called up for national service which he served in the RAF as a fighter control officer until December 1952. He returned to Kew in 1953, working with Ronald Keay on the revision of the Flora of West Tropical Africa, subsequently becoming its editor and seeing the revision to completion with publication of the second edition in 1973. He participated in two expeditions to West Africa, trekking in the British Cameroons and, in contrast, travelling by hovercraft between Senegal and Lake Chad on another. He had a personal interest in Phenology and maintained records of flowering times of local plants throughout most of his life. He wrote a summary work of his phenological records in 1973 and published a more comprehensive work after retirement in 2003, providing important evidence of global warming. His career at Kew progressed and, as an assistant keeper, he took charge of the Africa section based in Wing C of Kew's Herbarium. He undertook several expeditions to East Africa including Kenya, Tanzania, Malawi as well as Yemen and Ceylon. In 1986 he initiated the Rain Forest Genetic Resources Project, run by Kew and funded by the ODA at Limbe Botanic Garden, Cameroon.

== Retirement and later life ==
Hepper retired from Kew in 1990 but continued to study, travel and publish. At a personal level, Hepper's Christian faith combined with his botanical expertise, and in his own time he studied and wrote about the botany of the Bible and the Holy Lands, travelling in the region both before and after retirement. He designed the bible garden at St George's Cathedral, Jerusalem and used his knowledge for the botanical analysis of plant remains from the tomb of Tutenkhamun at Kew. He also edited and published his grandfather's memoirs from World War I and the autobiographical account of his early life in Leeds and Cumbria. Hepper died at Kingston Hospital 16 May 2013.

== Selected publications ==
- Hepper, F. N., ed. (1963). Flora of West Tropical Africa. Vol. III. Crown Agents for Oversea Governments and Administrations. p. 544.
- Hepper, F. Nigel (August 1969). "Arabian and African frankincense trees". The Journal of Egyptian Archaeology. 55. Sage: 66–72. doi:10.2307/3856001. JSTOR 3856001.
- Hepper, F. N., ed. (1972). Flora of west tropical Africa: all territories in West Africa south of latitude 18N̊, and to the west of Lake, Chad and Fernando Po. Vol. III part 2. Governments of Nigeria, Ghana, Sierra Leone and the Gambia. pp. 3. ISBN 0855920181.
- Hepper, Frank Nigel (1973). Commencement of flowering: phenological records at the Royal Botanic Gardens, Kew, Richmond 1953-1973. (unpublished)
- Hepper, F. Nigel (1976). Plants of the Yemen. p. 40.
- Hepper, Nigel (1982). Kew: Gardens for Science and Pleasure (Royal Botanic Gardens) (1 ed.). Stemmer House Publishers. ISBN 9780880450102. OCLC 8474413.
- Hepper, F. Nigel (June 1987). Planting a Bible garden : a practical reference guide for the home gardener, schools, colleges, and churches in all climates of the world. HMSO. ISBN 9780112500117.
- Hepper, F. Nigel (June 1989). Plant Hunting for Kew. Unipub. ISBN 978-0112500384.
- Hepper, F. Nigel (1990). Pharaoh's flowers : the botanical treasures of Tutankhamun. ISBN 9780981773636.
- Hepper, F. Nigel; Molan, Chris; Burn, Jeffrey J. (October 1995). Lands of the Bible: From Plants and Creatures to Battles and Covenants (Bible World). Thomas Nelson. ISBN 978-0785279082.
- Hepper, F. Nigel (1992). Illustrated Encyclopedia of Bible Plants : flowers and trees, fruits and vegetables, ecology. ISBN 9780851106434. OCLC 1100336690.
- Hepper, F.N. (2003). "Phenological records of English garden plants in Leeds (Yorkshire) and Richmond (Surrey) from 1946 to 2002. An analysis relating to global warming". Biodiversity and Conservation. 12 (12): 2503–2520. Bibcode:2003BiCon..12.2503H. doi:10.1023/A:1025847029377. S2CID 37244695.
- Hepper, E. Raymond (30 April 2011). Hepper, F. Nigel (ed.). Captain Hepper's Great War Diary, 1916-1919: A Battalion of the West Yorkshire Regiment on the Somme During the First World War. Hayloft. ISBN 9781904524816.
- Hepper, F. Nigel (20 January 2012). Life on a Lake District Smallholding. lulu.com. ISBN 9781471066252.
