= Ludwig Eduard Theodor Loesener =

German botanist (1865–1941)

Ludwig Eduard Theodor Lösener
- Born: 23 November 1865
- Died: 2 June 1941 (aged 75)
- Occupation: Botanist

Ludwig Eduard Theodor Lösener (23 November 1865 – 2 June 1941) was a German botanist who collected widely in the field in Germany: Amrum island (1912), the Alps, the Black Forest, Bavaria, Rügen island and Tyrol in modern Austria. His speciality was the Aquifoliaceae of the world. He also studied cultivars of Ilex species. His name is usually spelled as 'Loesener' in English sources.

In 1941, botanist Albert Charles Smith published the genus Loeseneriella, in the family Celastraceae, in his honour.

The standard author abbreviation Loes. is used to indicate this person as the authority when citing a botanical name. The International Plant Names Index lists more than 1800 taxa attributed to him.

== Works ==
- Theodor Lösener, Ludwig Eduard Theodor. (1890), Vorstudien zu einer Monographie der Aquifoliaceen, Inaugural-Dissertation, von Theodor Lösener,... (in German), Berlin: Druck von Mesch und Lichtenfeld
- Theodor Lösener, Ludwig Eduard Theodor. (1901), Monographia Aquifoliacearum, auctore Th. Loesener. Pars I [-II]. (in Latin), Halle: Druck von E. Karras
