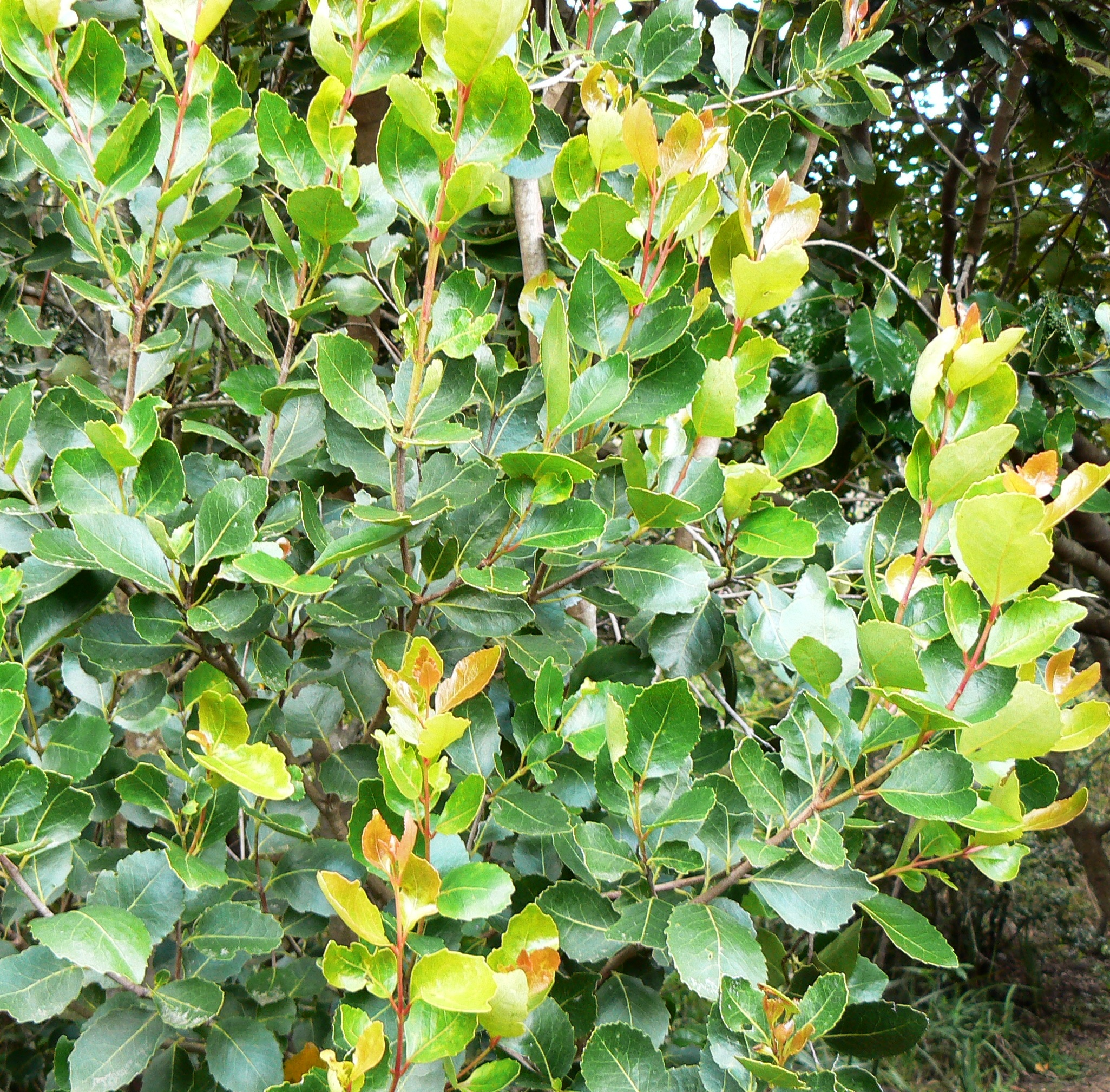
- Cassine peragua, the Cape Saffron tree.

Scientific classification
- Kingdom: Plantae
- Clade: Tracheophytes
- Clade: Angiosperms
- Clade: Eudicots
- Clade: Rosids
- Order: Celastrales
- Family: Celastraceae
- Genus: Cassine; L.

Species
- 11; see text

= Cassine (plant) =

Genus of flowering plants

Cassine is a genus of trees in the flowering plant family Celastraceae.

== Description ==
Cassine species grow as shrubs or small trees. The flowers are bisexual. The fruits have a pit (stone).

== Distribution ==
Cassine species are native to southern and southeastern Africa, Madagascar, the Indian Subcontinent, Indochina, and Java.

== Species ==
As of March 2026 Plants of the World Online accepts 11 species.

- Cassine albens (Retz.) Kosterm.
- Cassine balae Kosterm.
- Cassine burkeana (Sond.) Kuntze
- Cassine congylos Kosterm.
- Cassine grossa (Wall. ex Roxb.) Kosterm.
- Cassine kedarnathii Sasidh. & Swarupan.
- Cassine koordersii Kosterm.
- Cassine micrantha Loes.
- Cassine obiensis Kosterm.
- Cassine parvifolia Sond.
- Cassine peragua L.

=== Formerly placed here ===
- Elaeodendron australe Vent. (as Cassine australis (Vent.) Kuntze)
- Elaeodendron glaucum (Rottb.) Pers. (as Cassine glauca (Rottb.) Kuntze)
- Elaeodendron laneanum A.H.Moore (as Cassine laneana (A.H.Moore) J.W.Ingram)
- Elaeodendron orientale Jacq. (as Cassine orientalis (Jacq.) Kuntze)
- Elaeodendron viburnifolium (Juss.) Merr. (as Cassine viburnifolia (Juss.) Ding Hou)
