= Selepa celtis =

Scientific classification
- Domain: Eukaryota
- Kingdom: Animalia
- Phylum: Arthropoda
- Class: Insecta
- Order: Lepidoptera
- Superfamily: Noctuoidea
- Family: Nolidae
- Genus: Selepa
- Species: S. celtis

Binomial name
- Selepa celtis Moore, [1858]

Synonyms
- Selepa celtis Moore, [1860] 1858; Subrita? curviferella Walker, 1866; Selepa celtis ab. celtisella Strand, 1917; Selepa celtis celtisella Gaede, 1937

Species of moth

Selepa celtis, called the hairy caterpillar as a larva, is a moth of the family Nolidae.The species was first described by Frederic Moore in 1858. It is found in Oriental tropics of India, Sri Lanka, Taiwan towards the Ryukyu Islands and Australia.

== Description ==
Its forewings are pinkish-rufous gray. The hindwings are pale gray. Markings are strong in females. Postmedial finely double and antemedial regular. The caterpillar has a rufous-yellow body with a black head.

The caterpillar is a pest of several economically important agricultural crops.

Caterpillars can be controlled by using species Dissolcus parasitoids.

- Anacardium
- Lannea
- Mangifera
- Stereospermum
- Cassine
- Elaeodendron
- Emblica officinalis
- Combretum
- Shorea
- Bischofia
- Excoecaria agallocha
- Mallotus
- Phyllanthus
- Castanea
- Mammea
- Cinnamomum
- Careya
- Acacia nilotica
- Albizia
- Pithecellobium
- Xylia
- Strychnos
- Loranthus
- Lagerstroemia
- Woodfordia
- Sandoricum
- Ficus
- Eugenia
- Syzygium
- Pyrus
- Rosa
- Adina
- Mussaenda
- Salix
- Nephelium
- Schleichera
- Manilkara
- Solanum
- Duabanga
- Theobroma
- Camellia
- Celtis
- Trema
- Gmelina
