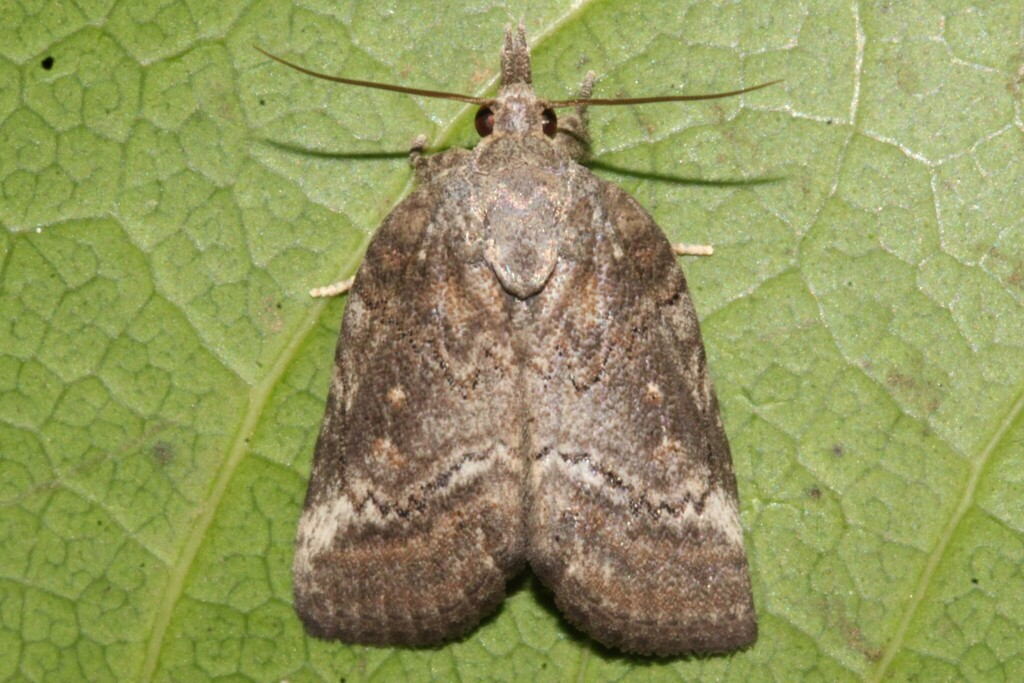

Scientific classification
- Kingdom: Animalia
- Phylum: Arthropoda
- Class: Insecta
- Order: Lepidoptera
- Superfamily: Noctuoidea
- Family: Nolidae
- Genus: Selepa
- Species: S. violescens

Binomial name
- Selepa violescens Hampson 1912

= Selepa violescens =

Species of moth native to Africa

Selepa violescens is a species of moth in the family Nolidae.

== Range ==
It is found in The Gambia.

== Ecology ==
There are no known host plants.

== Taxonomy ==
It was described by Hampson in 1912.
