= Cassine koordersii =

Conservation status
- Critically endangered, possibly extinct in the wild (IUCN 3.1)

Scientific classification
- Kingdom: Plantae
- Clade: Tracheophytes
- Clade: Angiosperms
- Clade: Eudicots
- Clade: Rosids
- Order: Celastrales
- Family: Celastraceae
- Genus: Cassine
- Species: C. koordersii

Binomial name
- Cassine koordersii Kosterm.

Species of flowering plant

Cassine koordersii is a species of plant in the family Celastraceae. It is endemic to Java in Indonesia. It is a critically endangered species threatened by habitat loss.
