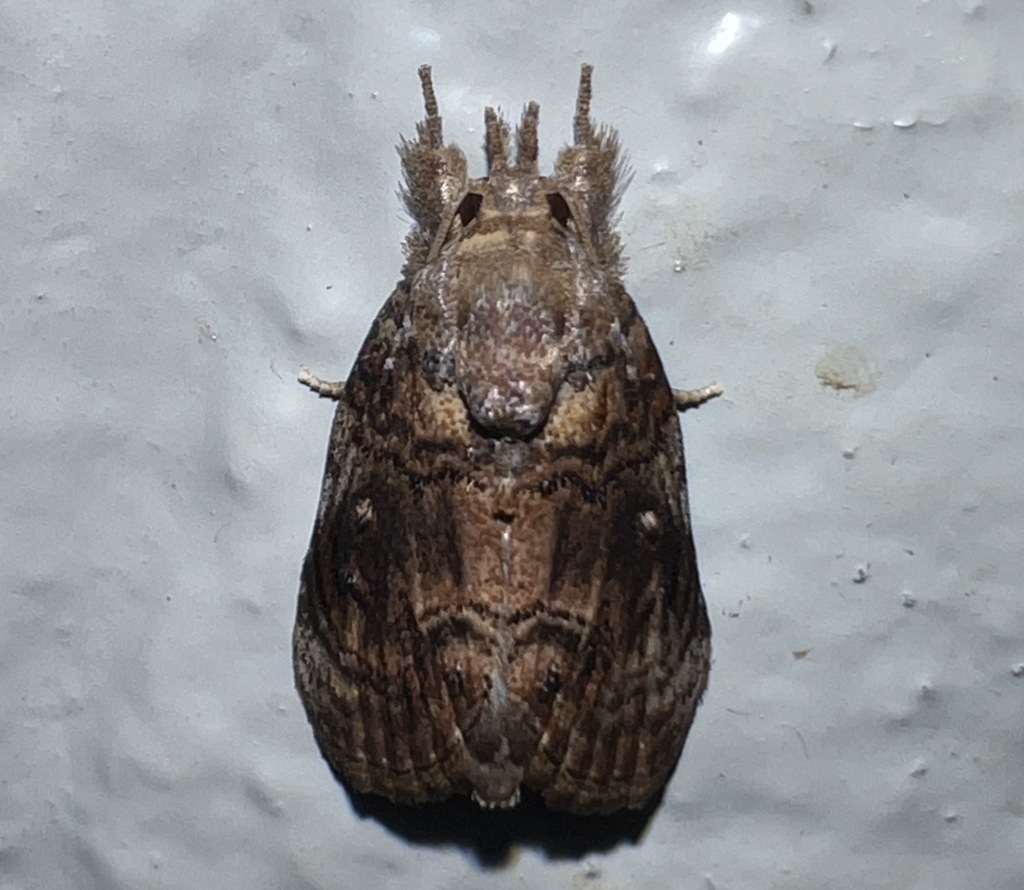

Scientific classification
- Kingdom: Animalia
- Phylum: Arthropoda
- Clade: Pancrustacea
- Class: Insecta
- Order: Lepidoptera
- Superfamily: Noctuoidea
- Family: Nolidae
- Genus: Selepa
- Species: S. cumasia

Binomial name
- Selepa cumasia Hampson, 1912

= Selepa cumasia =

Species of moth

Selepa cumasia is a species of moth in the family Nolidae. It is found in Ghana, Nigeria, and Senegal. It was first described by George Francis Hampson in 1912.
