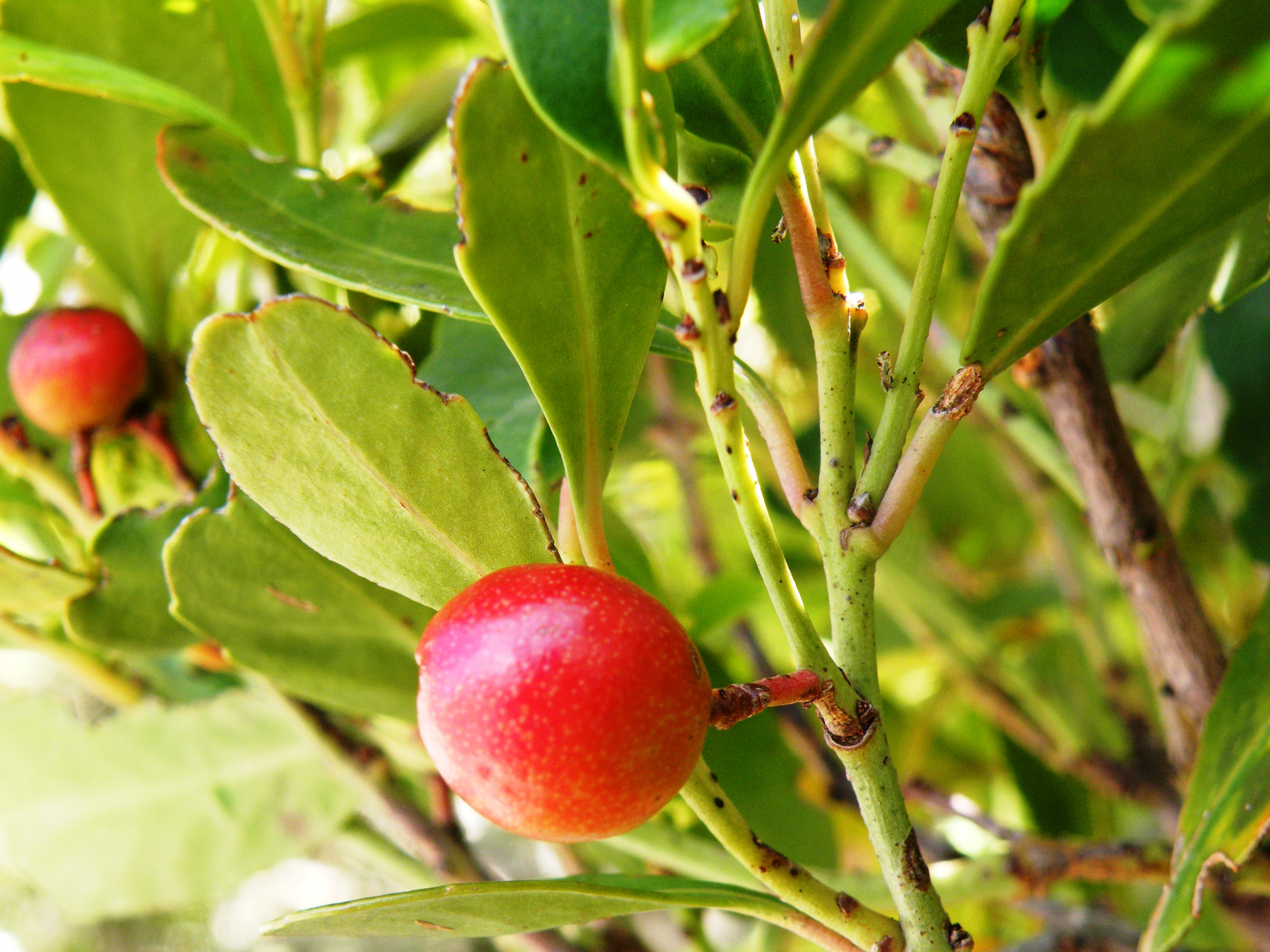

Scientific classification
- Kingdom: Plantae
- Clade: Tracheophytes
- Clade: Angiosperms
- Clade: Eudicots
- Clade: Rosids
- Order: Celastrales
- Family: Celastraceae
- Genus: Elaeodendron
- Species: E. schinoides

Binomial name
- Elaeodendron schinoides Spreng. (1824)

Synonyms
- Cassine schinoides (Spreng.) R.H.Archer (1997); Hartogia angustifolia Turcz. (1863); Hartogia capensis L.f. (1782), nom. illeg.; Hartogia lanceolata Eckl. & Zeyh. ex Szyszył. (1888); Hartogia multiflora Eckl. & Zeyh. (1835); Hartogia riparia Eckl. & Zeyh. (1835); Hartogia schinoides C.A.Sm. (1951); Hartogiella schinoides (Spreng.) Codd (1983); Schrebera schinoides Thunb. (1794), not validly publ.

= Elaeodendron schinoides =

Genus of trees

Elaeodendron schinoides (known as the spoonwood or smalblad), is a species of flowering plant in family Celastraceae. It is a medium-sized tree from the southern Western Cape province of South Africa. It has opposing leaves that show elastic threads when broken, and red fleshy fruit that becomes dry later in the year.
