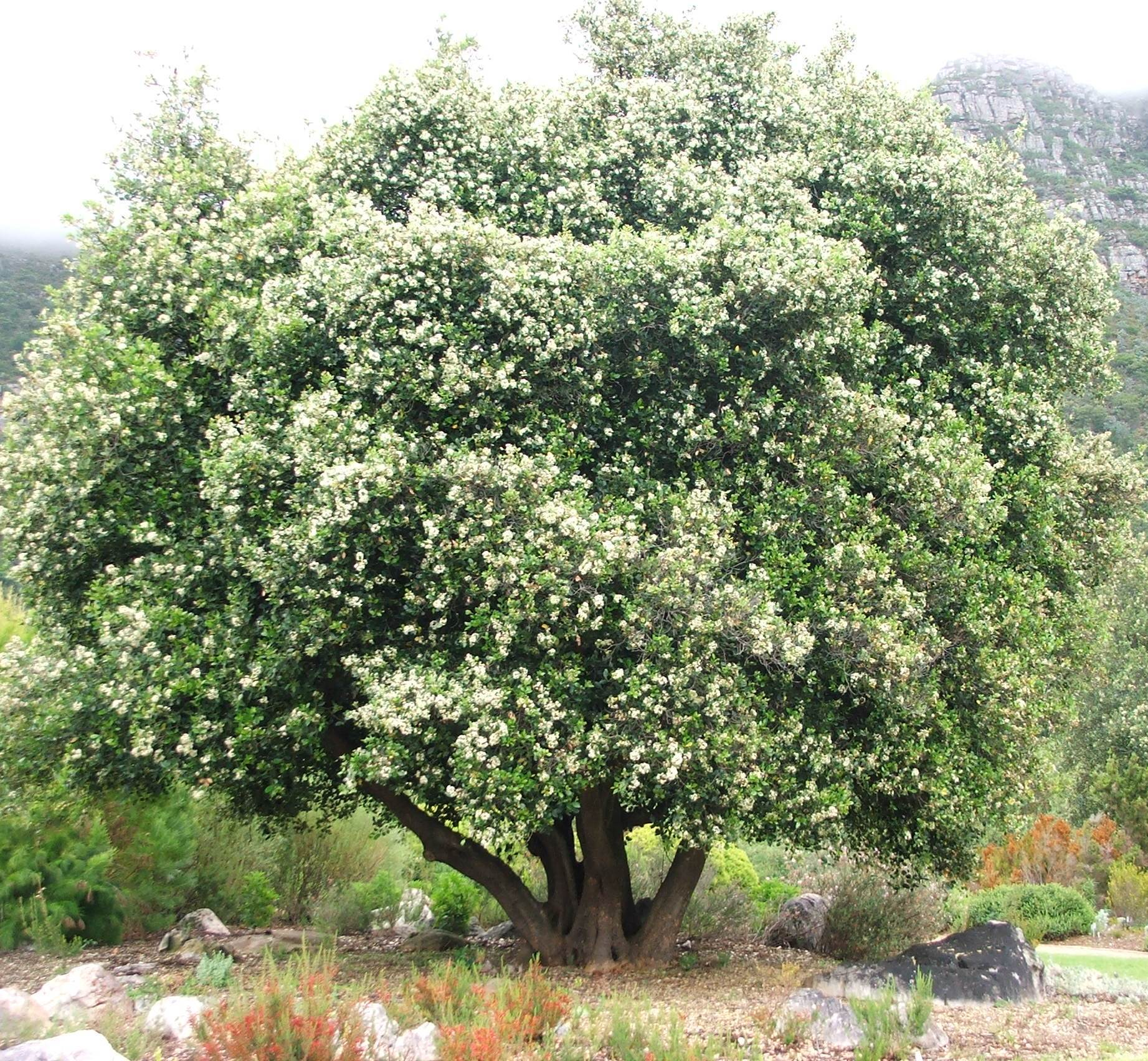
- In flower in a Cape Town garden

Conservation status
- Least Concern (IUCN 3.1)

Scientific classification
- Kingdom: Plantae
- Clade: Tracheophytes
- Clade: Angiosperms
- Clade: Eudicots
- Clade: Rosids
- Order: Celastrales
- Family: Celastraceae
- Genus: Cassine
- Species: C. peragua

Binomial name
- Cassine peragua L.

Synonyms
- Cassine colpoon Thunb.; Cassine kraussiana Hochst.; Cassine kraussiana Bernh. ex Harv. & Sond.; Cassine kraussiana Bernh.; Cassine serratifolia Salisb.; Cassine sphaerocarpa Cels ex Steud.; Elaeodendron ilicifolium Ten.; Elaeodendron kraussianum (Bernard ex Harv. & Sond.) Sim; Euonymus colpoon L.

= Cassine peragua =

Cape saffron

Species of tree

Cassine peragua, also known as Cape saffron, bastard saffron and forest spoonwood, is a medium-sized tree with fragrant flowers, decorative fruits and a saffron-coloured trunk. It is indigenous to the Afro-montane forests of South Africa.

== Appearance ==
Cape saffron is an evergreen tree which is usually around 2 to 5 meters in height, but can sometimes grow to 15 meters in the right conditions. The tough, round, leathery leaves are usually dark green, but can be copper, orange or scarlet coloured depending on growth.

The bunches of small, bisexual flowers have a strong, but pleasant fragrance, and the fruits are berries that appear as green and then gradually darken to purple and black.

The trunk eventually assumes an orange saffron colour, as the grey bark flakes off exposing the orange under-layer.

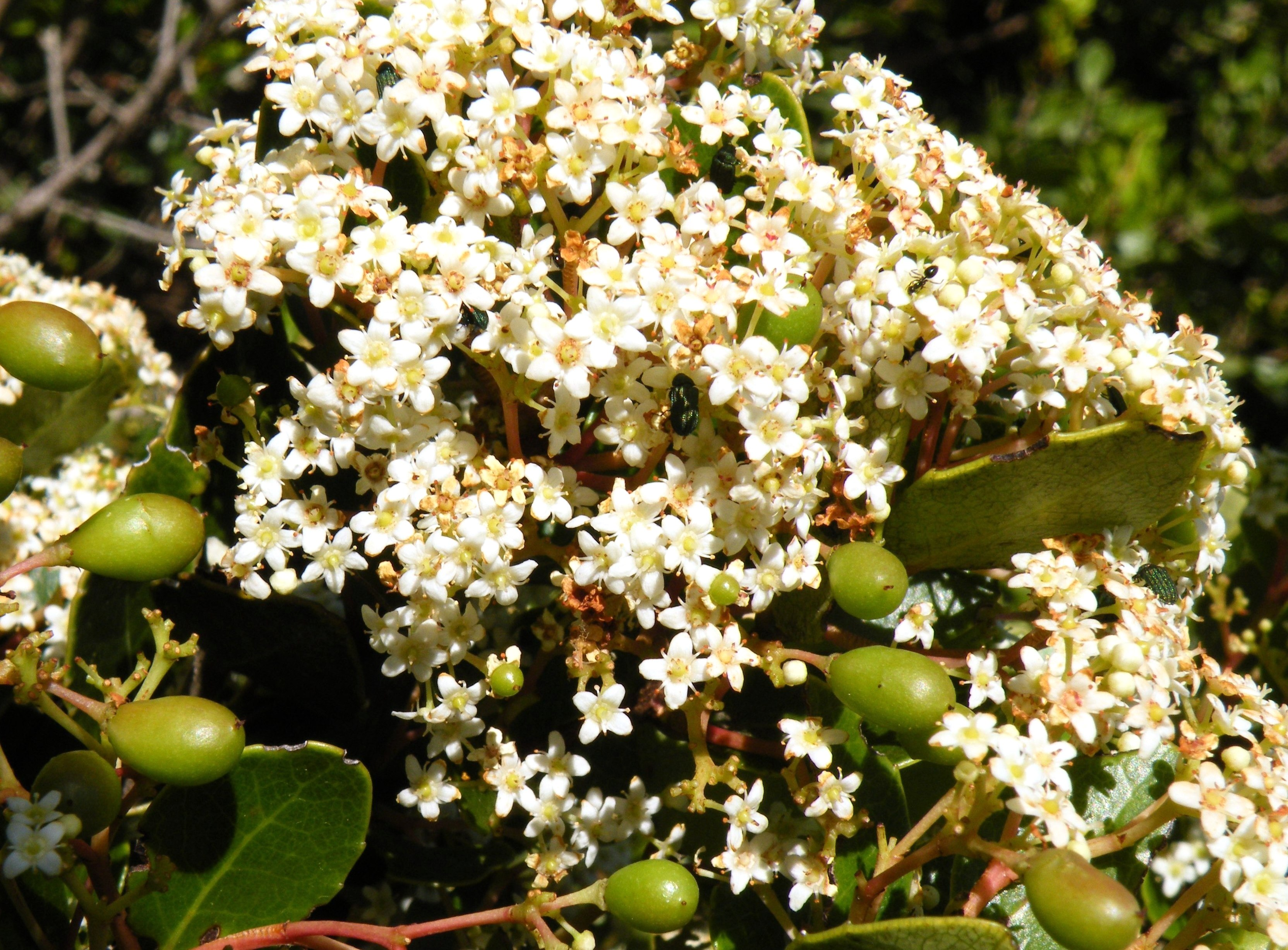
Detail of flowers

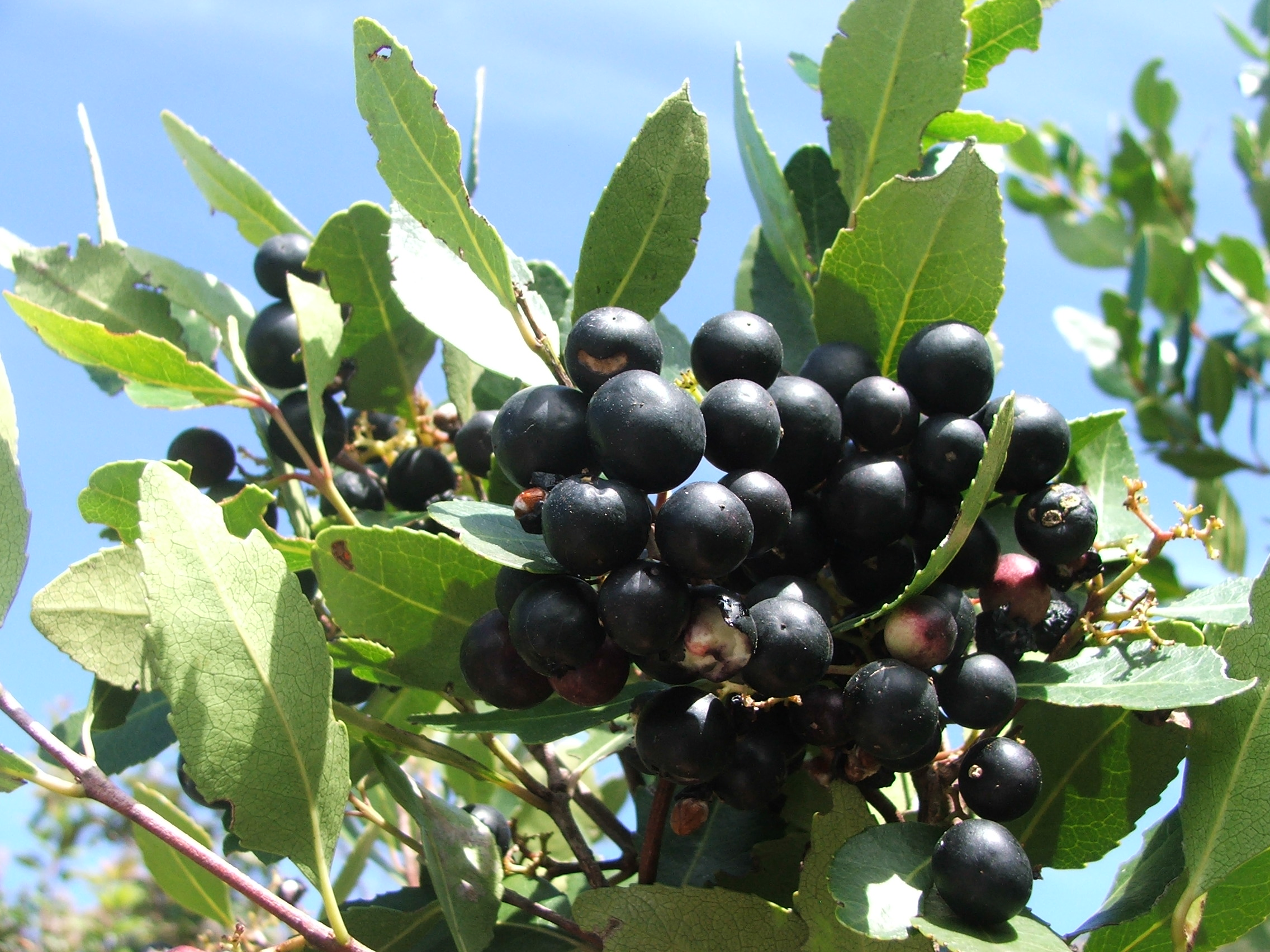
Detail of the fruit

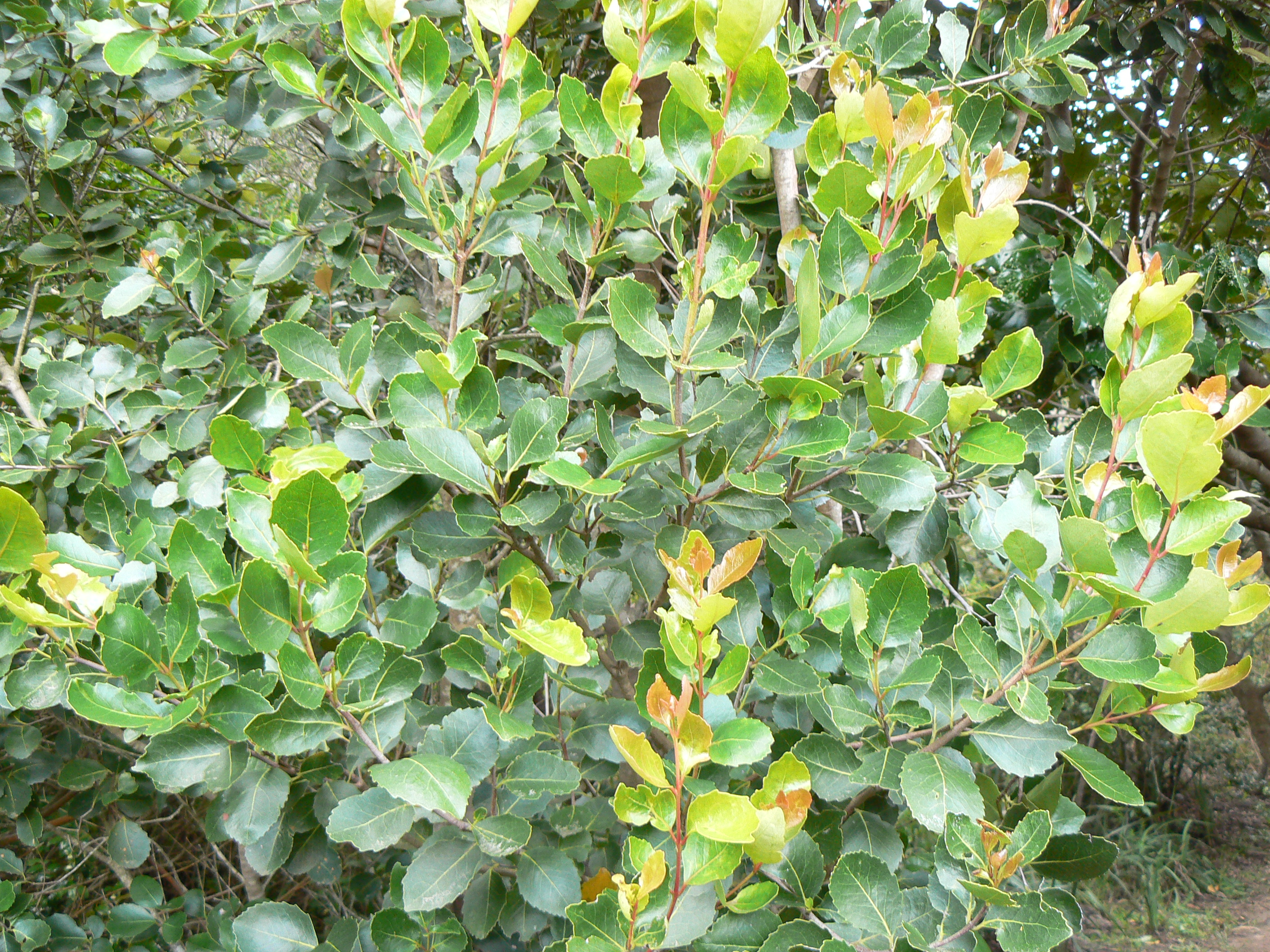
Detail of colourful foliage

== Natural distribution ==
It is naturally distributed throughout the southern and eastern parts of South Africa, including Eswatini. Here it grows in a wide variety of habitats, from deep Afromontane forest to coastal dunes and rocky mountain slopes. In addition to the most common and widespread subspecies, there are two rare dwarfed subspecies (subsp. barbara & affinis) which occur in restricted pockets in the Western Cape.

It is now cultivated as an ornamental garden tree throughout South Africa.

== Human usage ==
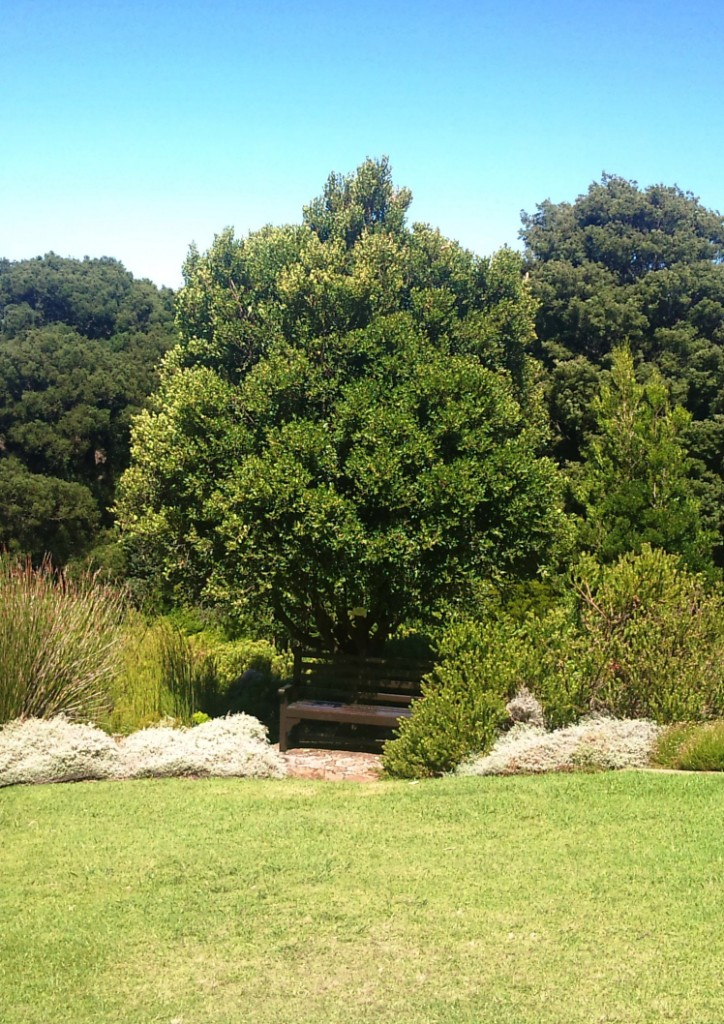
Cape saffron as a garden subject

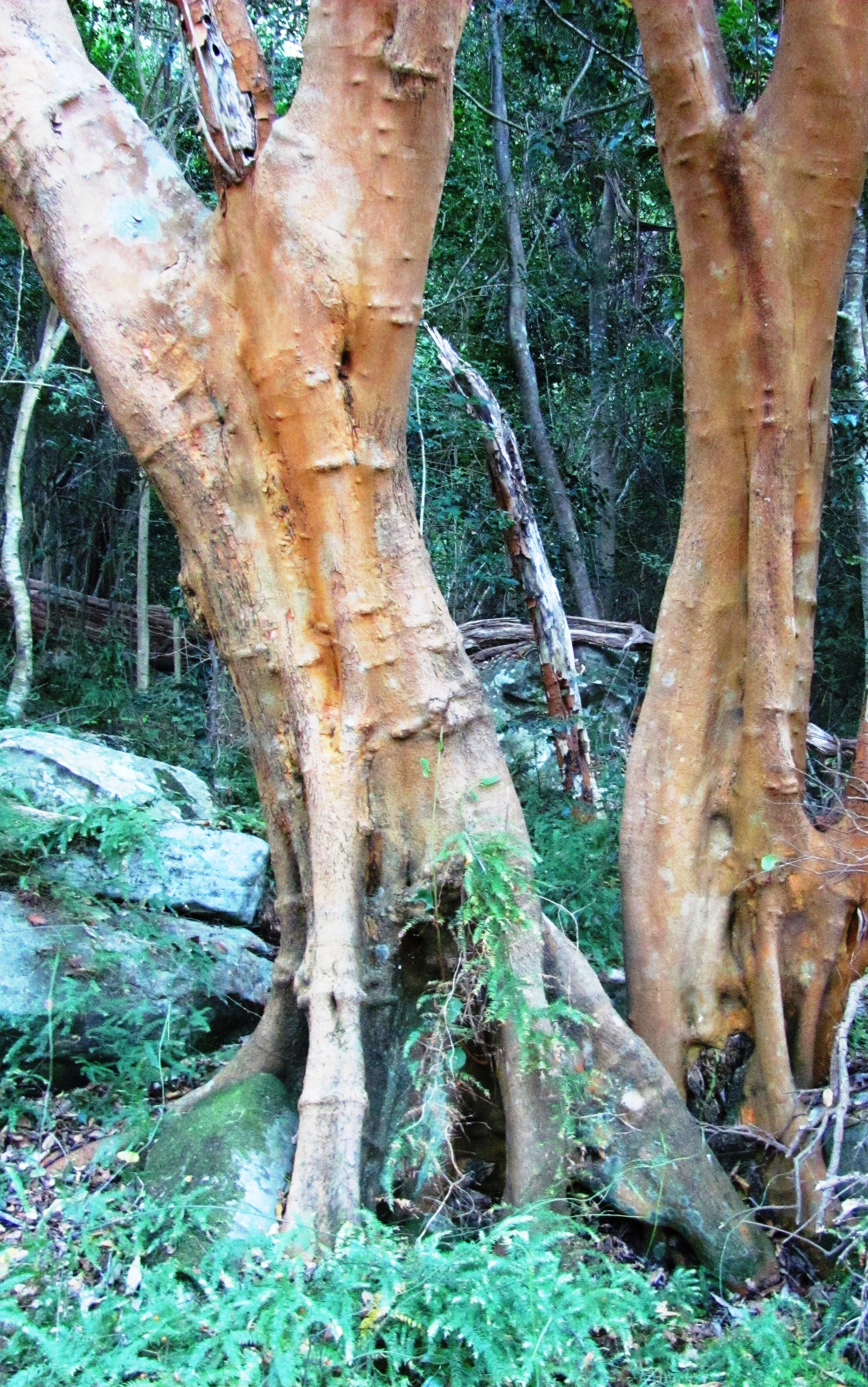
A wild specimen with its distinctive saffron-coloured trunk

Cape saffron has been used locally for centuries for its beautiful, hard wood, which assumes a yellowish-orange colour and was traditionally valued for furniture.

Its more common use now is as an attractive ornamental feature in gardens. It grows slowly, but is very tough and resistant to wind. In exposed positions, in direct sun or wind, it will tend to grow shorter, lower and denser. It forms an attractive, domed shape, with a saffron-coloured trunk and often multi-coloured foliage.

The fruits attract great numbers of birds, and the flowers have a pleasant fragrance.
