= Selepa =

Scientific classification
- Domain: Eukaryota
- Kingdom: Animalia
- Phylum: Arthropoda
- Class: Insecta
- Order: Lepidoptera
- Superfamily: Noctuoidea
- Family: Nolidae
- Genus: Selepa; Moore, 1858

Synonyms
- Detounda Walker, 1864

Genus of moths

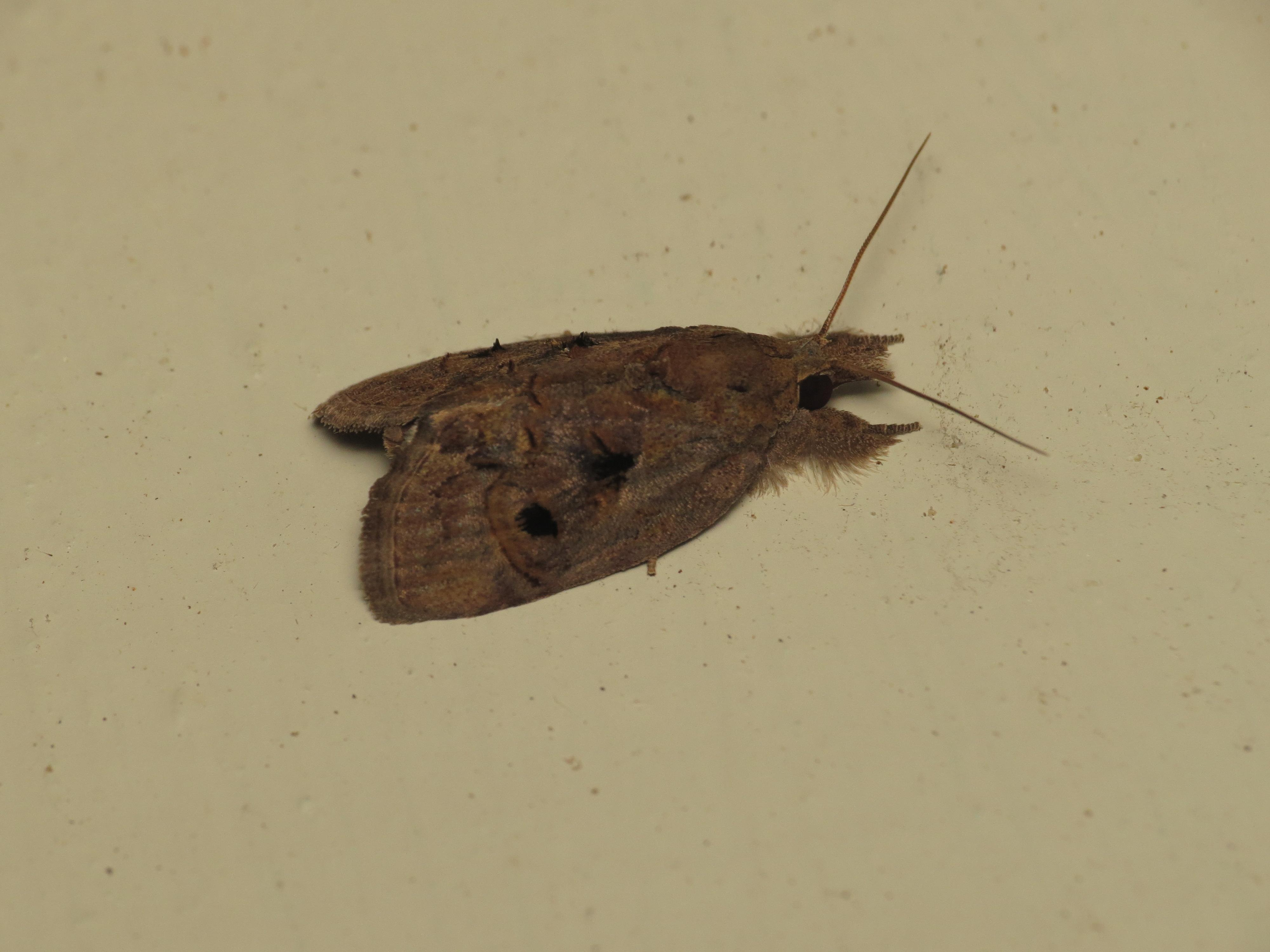

Selepa is a genus of moths belonging to the family Nolidae.

The species of this genus are found in Eastern Africa, Southeastern Asia and Australia.

Species:

- Selepa acervata Hulstaert, 1924
- Selepa albisigna Hampson, 1914
- Selepa celtis Moore, 1858
- Selepa cumasia Hampson, 1912
- Selepa curculella Walker, 1866
- Selepa discigera Walker, 1864
- Selepa docilis Butler, 1881
- Selepa euryochra Turner, 1920
- Selepa ferrofusa Hampson, 1905
- Selepa geraea Hampson, 1905
- Selepa ianthina Bethune-Baker, 1911
- Selepa leucogonia Hampson, 1905
- Selepa leucograpta Hampson, 1912
- Selepa molybdea Hampson, 1912
- Selepa nephelozona Hampson, 1905
- Selepa nigralba Hampson, 1895
- Selepa oranga Swinhoe, 1918
- Selepa picilinea Turner, 1939
- Selepa plumbeata Hampson, 1912
- Selepa rabdota Hampson, 1891
- Selepa renirotunda Berio, 1976/77
- Selepa rhythmopis Turner, 1902
- Selepa rufescens Hampson, 1912
- Selepa smilacis Mell, 1943
- Selepa spurcata Walker, 1864
- Selepa stigmatophora Hampson, 1895
- Selepa transvalica Hampson, 1912
- Selepa violascens Hampson, 1912
- Selepa violescens Hampson, 1912
