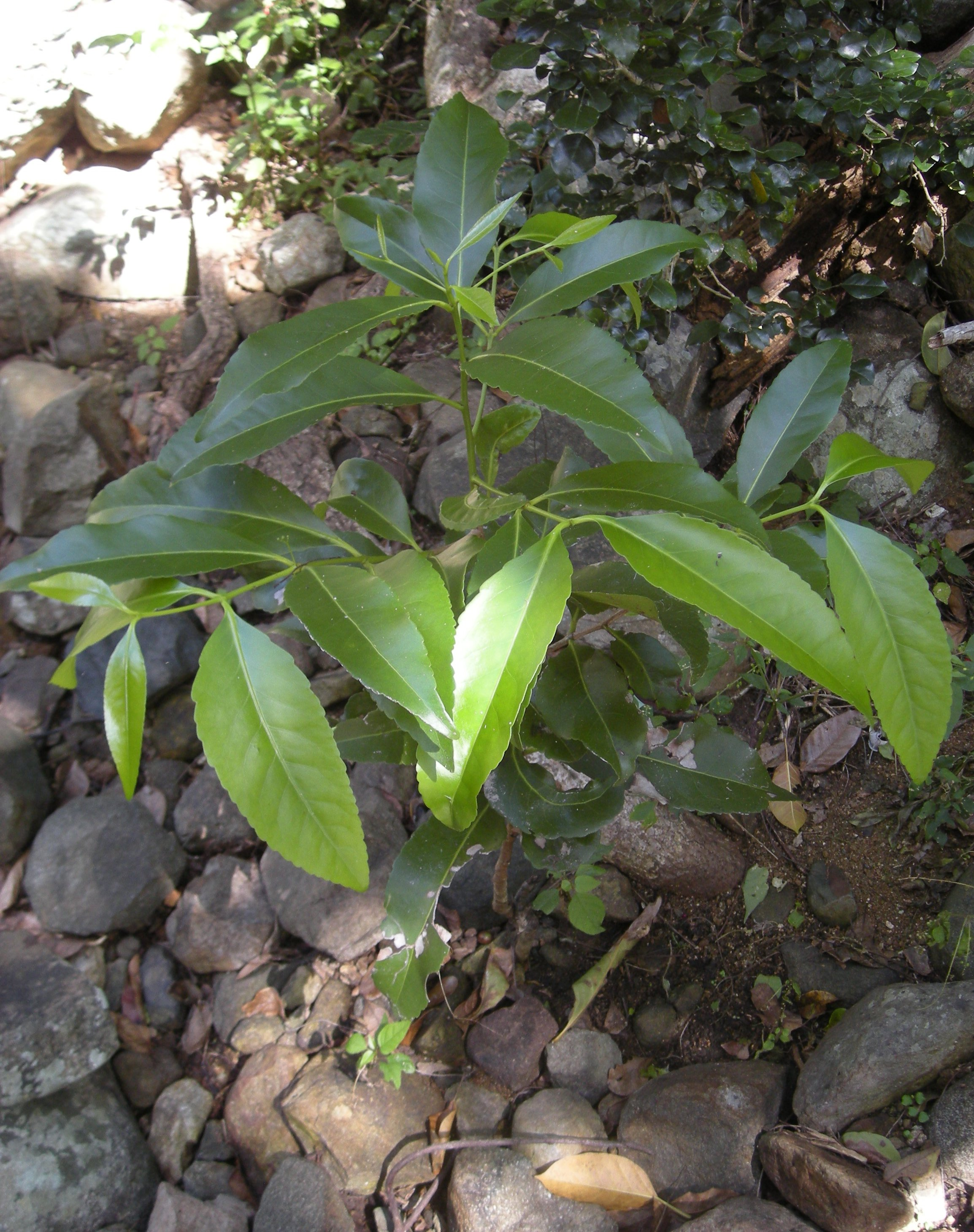
- Elaeodendron melanocarpum seedling

Scientific classification
- Kingdom: Plantae
- Clade: Tracheophytes
- Clade: Angiosperms
- Clade: Eudicots
- Clade: Rosids
- Order: Celastrales
- Family: Celastraceae
- Genus: Elaeodendron
- Species: E. melanocarpum

Binomial name
- Elaeodendron melanocarpum F.Muell.

Synonyms
- Cassine melanocarpa

= Elaeodendron melanocarpum =

Species of tree from northern Australia

Elaeodendron melanocarpum is a species of shrubs or small trees endemic to northern Australia. The natural range extends from The Kimberley across The Top End to Cape York Peninsula and southwards to South East Queensland. The species occurs in monsoon forests and drier types of rainforests, commonly along streams.

Elaeodendron melanocarpum was previously included in the genus Cassine; however, it is now considered that only three African species belong to Cassine.

== Description ==
Elaeodendron melanocarpum can grow as a small tree up to 15 m tall, however the more common growth form is a straggly shrub growing in rocky locales. The glossy green leaves are opposite, and oval or elliptical in shape. Flowers are small and white, with separate male and female flowers. Fruits are black and fleshy, up to 2 cm long, with a stony endocarp. Overall, the fruit resembles an olive or a small plum, and this is the origin of the common names for olive plum, false olive and black olive.

== Gallery ==
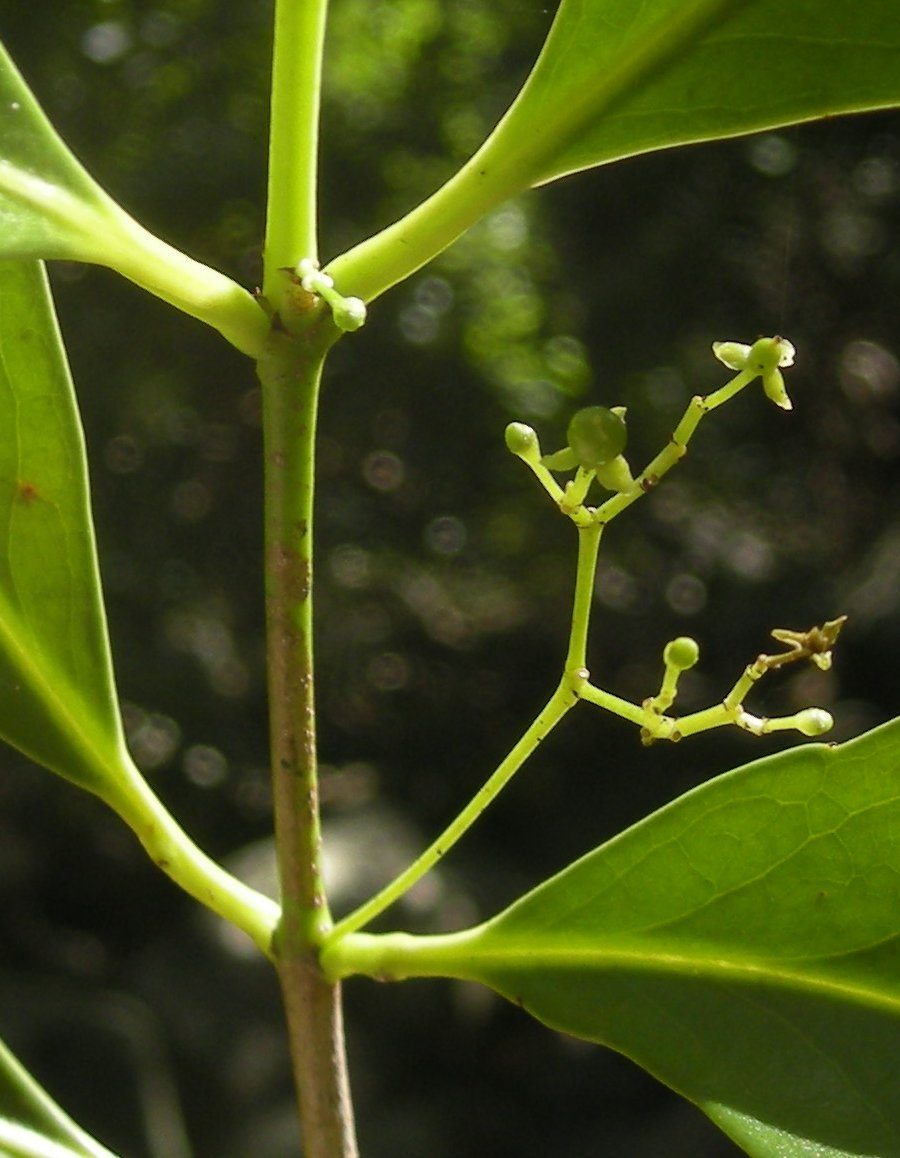
Elaeodendron melanocarpum flowers.

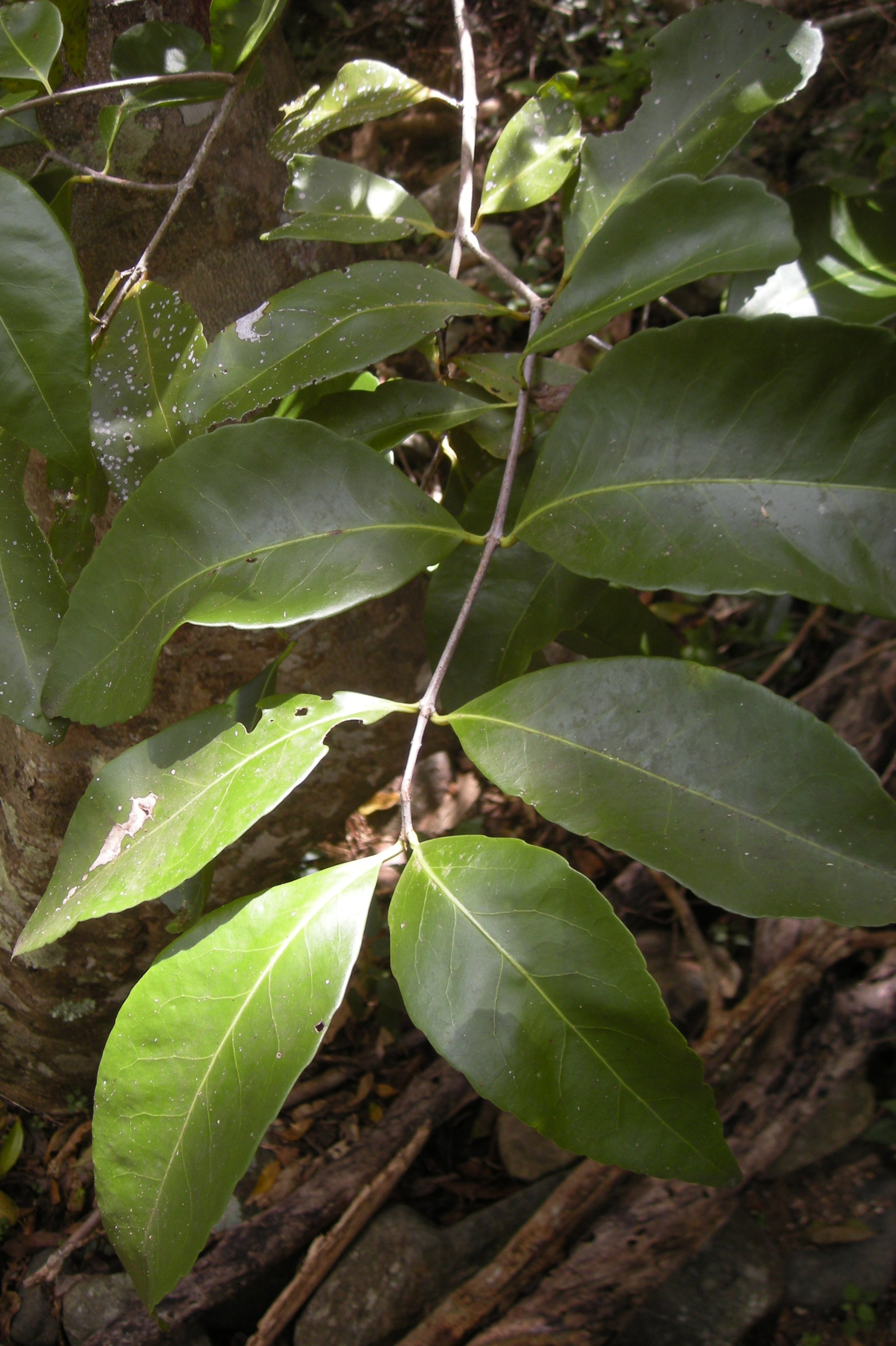
Elaeodendron melanocarpum foliage.

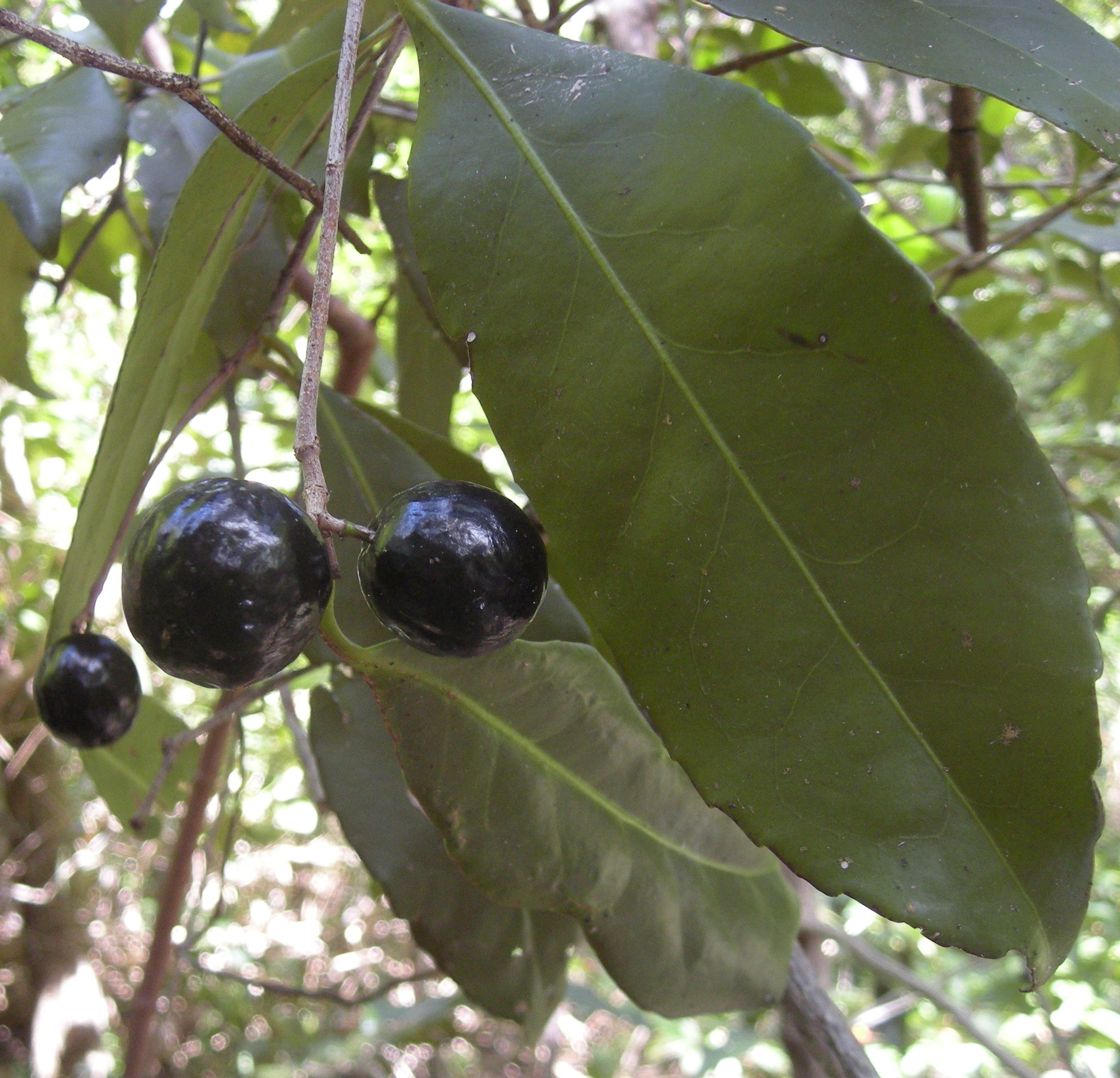
Elaeodendron melanocarpum fruit.
