= Selepa plumbeata =

Scientific classification
- Kingdom: Animalia
- Phylum: Arthropoda
- Class: Insecta
- Order: Lepidoptera
- Superfamily: Noctuoidea
- Family: Nolidae
- Genus: Selepa
- Species: S. plumbeata

Binomial name
- Selepa plumbeata Hampson, 1912

Species of moth

Selepa plumbeata is a moth of the family Nolidae first described by George Hampson in 1912. It is found in Oriental tropics of India, Sri Lanka, and Borneo.

== Description ==
Its forewings are grayish. Submarginal closer to margin. There is a grayish triangle on the central costa.

Its larval food plants are members of the genus Anacardium.
