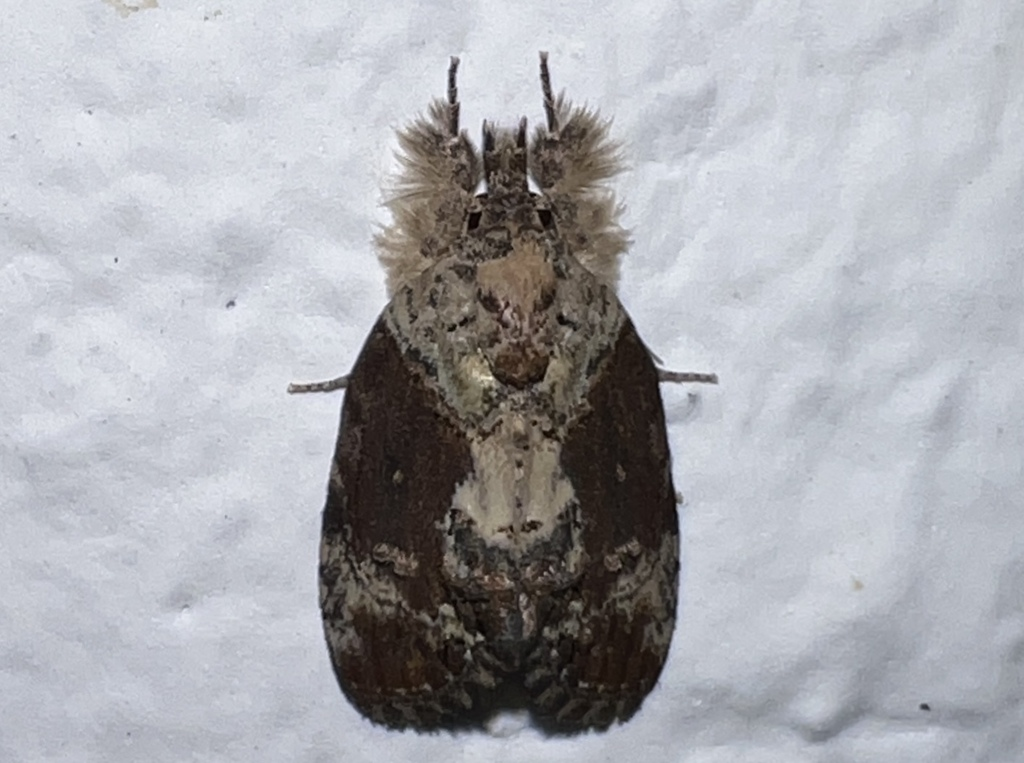

Scientific classification
- Kingdom: Animalia
- Phylum: Arthropoda
- Clade: Pancrustacea
- Class: Insecta
- Order: Lepidoptera
- Superfamily: Noctuoidea
- Family: Nolidae
- Genus: Selepa
- Species: S. leucogonia

Binomial name
- Selepa leucogonia Hampson 1905

= Selepa leucogonia =

Species of moth

Selepa leucogonia is a species of moth in the Family Nolidae. It is found in The Gambia, Kenya, and Sierra Leone.
