= Selepa discigera =

Scientific classification
- Kingdom: Animalia
- Phylum: Arthropoda
- Class: Insecta
- Order: Lepidoptera
- Superfamily: Noctuoidea
- Family: Nolidae
- Genus: Selepa
- Species: S. discigera

Binomial name
- Selepa discigera (Walker, 1864)

Synonyms
- Gadirtha? discigera Walker, 1864; Selepa strigifera Moore, 1885; Selepa discigera ab. caniceps Strand, 1917; Selepa discigera ab. hampsoni Strand, 1917; Selepa discigera ab. walkeri Strand, 1917; Selepa discigera caniceps, hampsoni and walkeri Gaede, 1937

Species of moth

Selepa discigera is a moth of the family Nolidae first described by Francis Walker in 1864. It is found in Oriental tropics of India, Sri Lanka, New Guinea and Australia.

== Description ==
Its forewings are blackish. A black longitudinal streak with a whitish border can be found sub-dorsally.

The larval food plants are Stillingia, Ficus and Rhus species.
