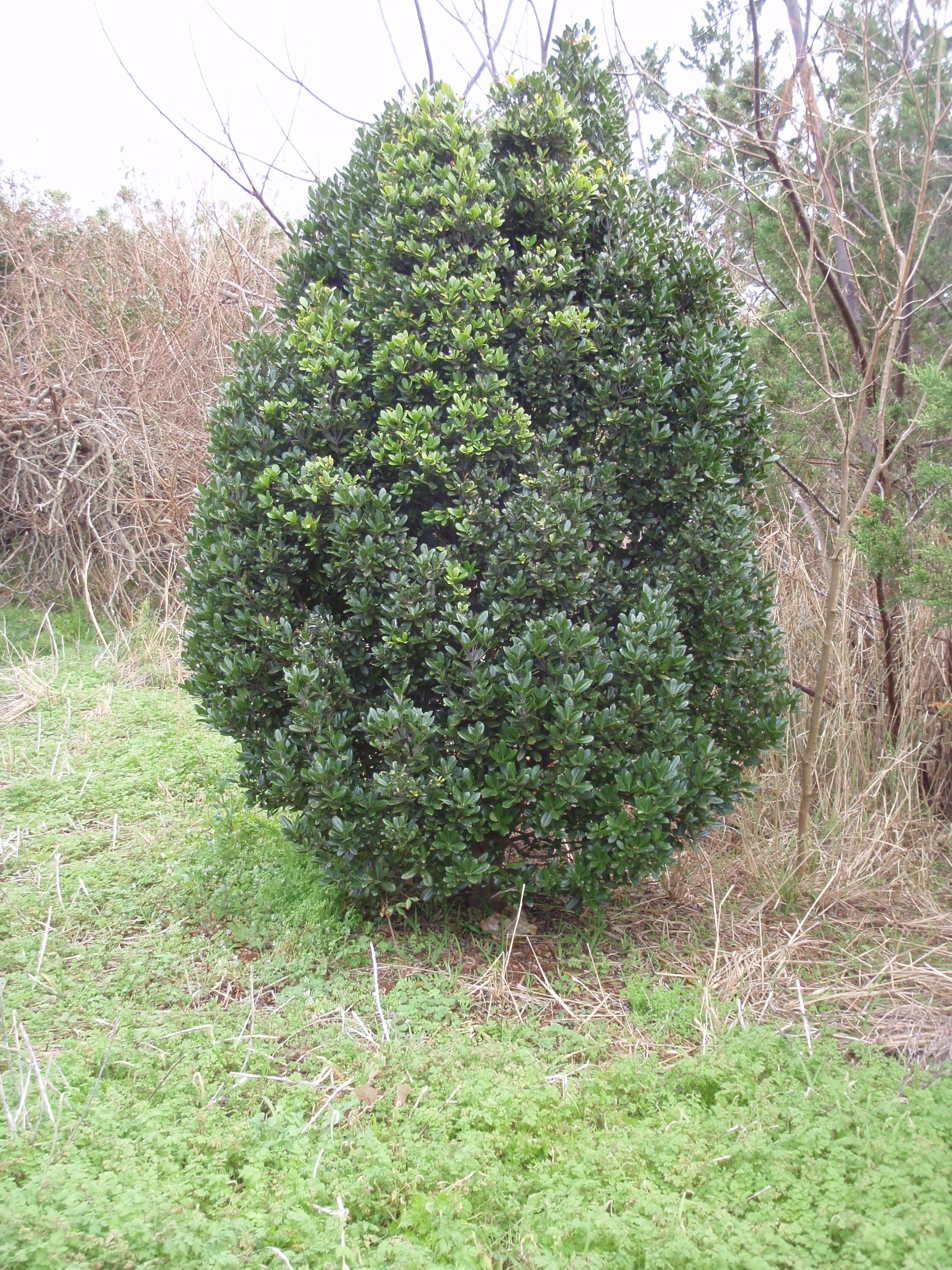

Conservation status
- Endangered (IUCN 3.1)

Scientific classification
- Kingdom: Plantae
- Clade: Tracheophytes
- Clade: Angiosperms
- Clade: Eudicots
- Clade: Rosids
- Order: Celastrales
- Family: Celastraceae
- Genus: Elaeodendron
- Species: E. laneanum

Binomial name
- Elaeodendron laneanum A.H.Moore

Synonyms
- Cassine laneana (A.H.Moore) J.W.Ingram

= Elaeodendron laneanum =

Species of tree

Elaeodendron laneanum, commonly known as the Bermuda olivewood, is a species of tree in the family Celastraceae that is endemic to Bermuda. It is considered an endangered species.

== Distribution and habitat ==
Endemic to Bermuda, Elaeodendron laneanum has a patchy distribution across the main island. The original habitat of this species, forested valleys and hillsides, has largely been cleared for agriculture. The remaining natural range of this species can mainly be found in Walsingham Tract, however, it is widely used as an ornamental plant and can be found in parks and gardens across Bermuda.

== Description ==
Elaeodendron laneanum is an evergreen tree growing 8–14 m (26–46 ft) tall with a smooth, stout trunk up to 50 cm (20 in) in diameter. The leaves are glossy above with a toothed margin, light green when young and darkening as they mature. The flowers are small, greenish-white in colour, and occur in clusters at the tips of branches and develop into small yellowish-green fruits.

== Conservation status ==
Elaeodendron laneanum is listed as endangered on the International Union for Conservation of Nature's Red List under criteria B1ab(iii, iv, v), B2ab(iii, iv, v), and C2a(i), based on its limited range and small population. The entire population consists of just 809 mature individuals, with the largest wild subpopulation in Walsingham Nature Reserve consisting of 169 mature trees. Its natural habitat is severely fragmented, and the extent and quality of this remaining habitat is declining due to human disturbance and invasive species. The fruits and seedlings are eaten by birds and rats on the main island, preventing natural regeneration, though seedlings are abundant on rat-free Nonsuch Island.

== Uses ==
The bark of Elaeodendron laneanum was used by early colonists to tan leather. Easily grown from seed, it is now used extensively as an ornamental plant across Bermuda and as a street tree in the city of Hamilton, Bermuda.
