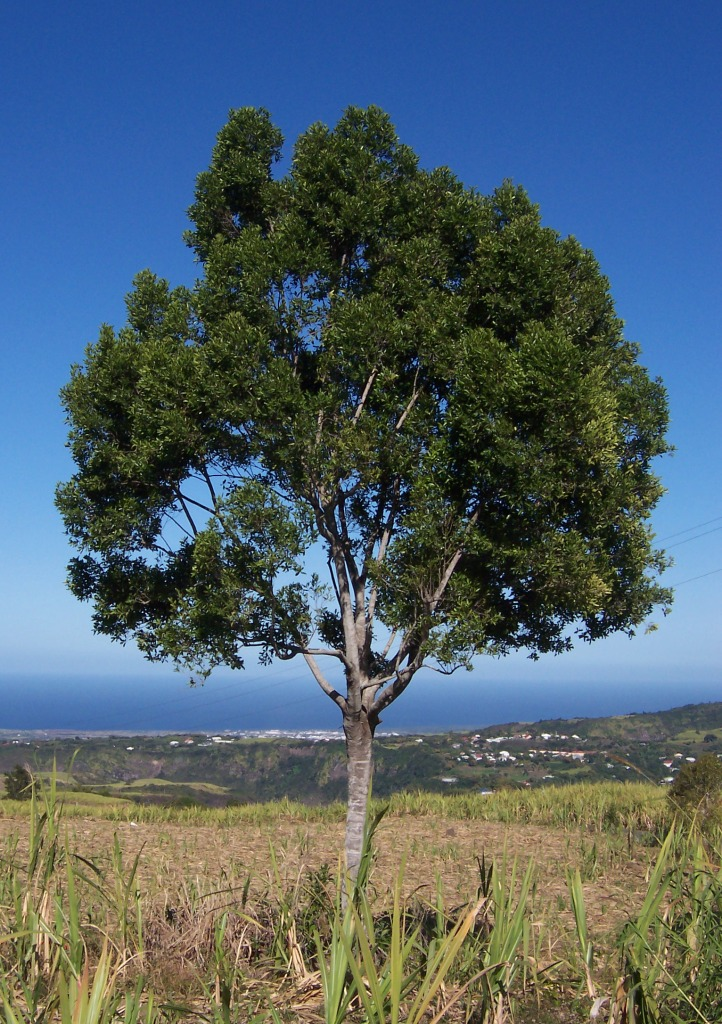
- Young Elaeodendron orientale tree on Réunion island

Scientific classification
- Kingdom: Plantae
- Clade: Tracheophytes
- Clade: Angiosperms
- Clade: Eudicots
- Clade: Rosids
- Order: Celastrales
- Family: Celastraceae
- Genus: Elaeodendron
- Species: E. orientale

Binomial name
- Elaeodendron orientale Jacq.

Synonyms
- Aralia chabrieri Van Geert; Cassine orientalis (Jacq.) Kuntze; Elaeodendron indicum Gaertn.; Elaeodendron pyramidale Salisb.; Rubentia angustifolia Colla; Rubentia longifolia Desf.; Rubentia mauritiana Desf.; Rubentia olivina J.F.Gmel.; Rubentia orientalis (Jacq.) Dum.Cours.

= Elaeodendron orientale =

Species of flowering plant

Elaeodendron orientale, known locally as bois d'olive, is a tall canopy tree endemic to the Mascarene Islands of Mauritius, Réunion, and Rodrigues.

Juveniles have shiny narrow leaves with a bright red mid-rib and smooth edges; while adult leaves are wide and oval with a serrated margin.

In its native islands the tree has been severely over-exploited for its valuable reddish wood. Adults reach up to 20 meters in height. The fruits resemble small olives, from which the local name derives.

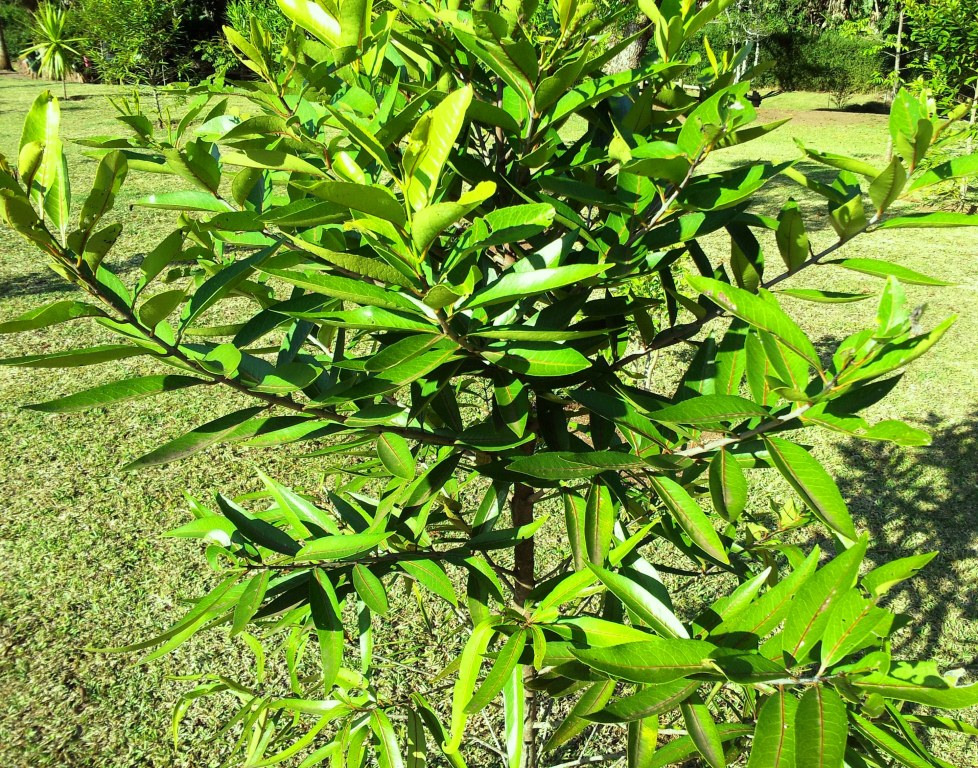
Foliage of a young tree

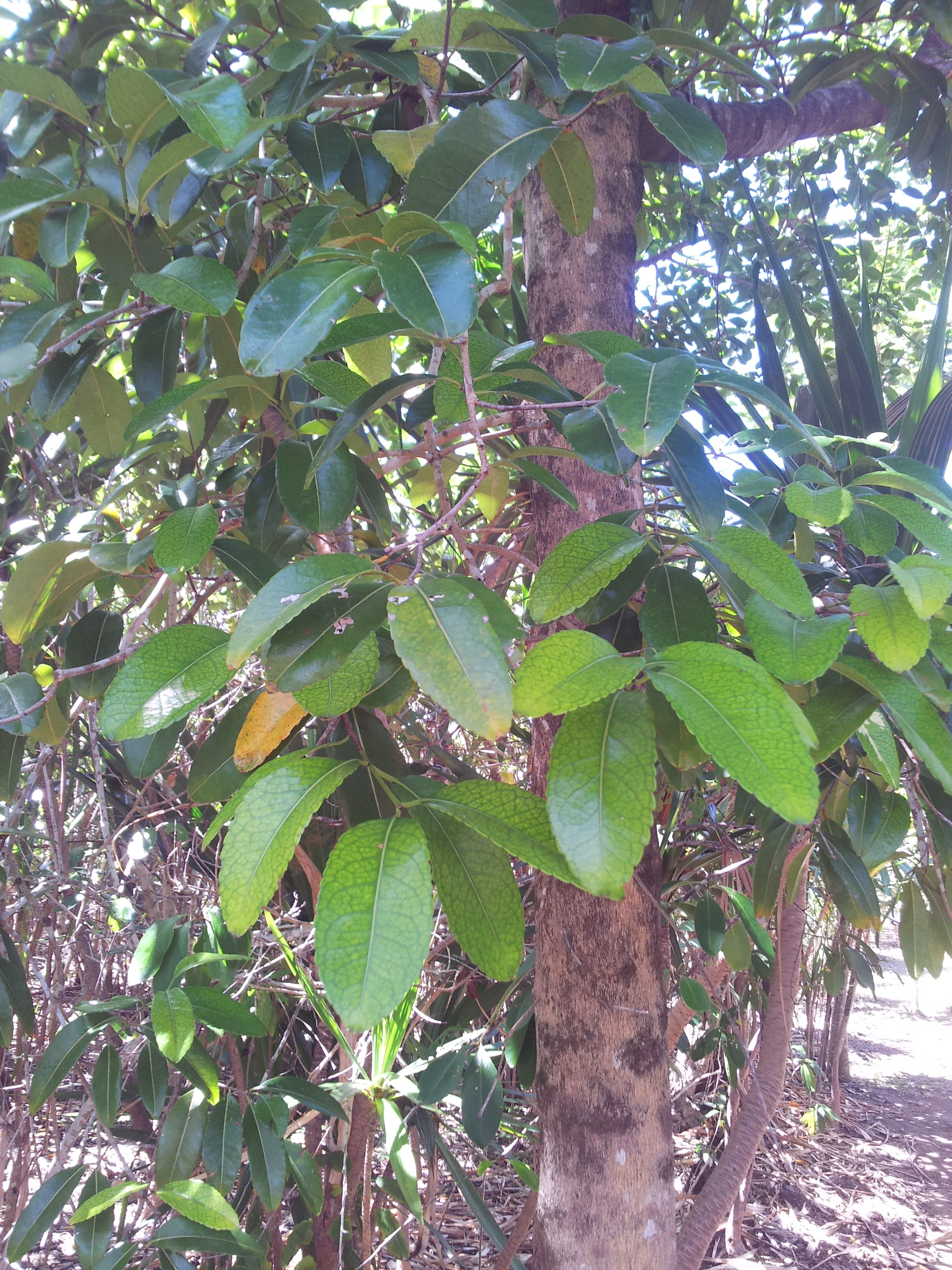
Foliage of an adult
