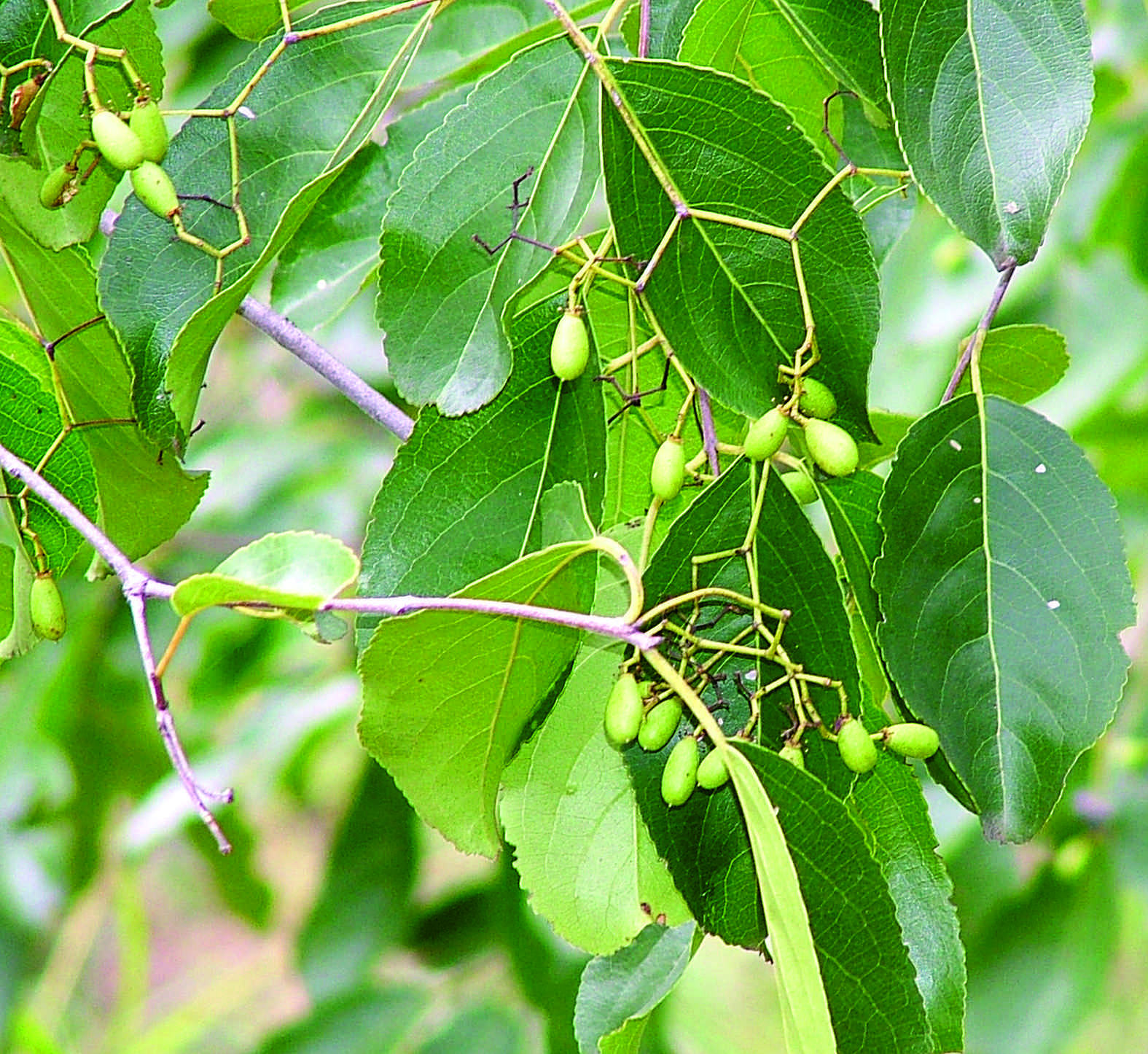

Conservation status
- Least Concern (IUCN 3.1)

Scientific classification
- Kingdom: Plantae
- Clade: Tracheophytes
- Clade: Angiosperms
- Clade: Eudicots
- Clade: Rosids
- Order: Celastrales
- Family: Celastraceae
- Genus: Elaeodendron
- Species: E. glaucum

Binomial name
- Elaeodendron glaucum (Rottb.) Pers.

Synonyms
- Barringtonia sphaerocarpa C.A.Gardner; Cassine glauca (Rottb.) Kuntze; Celastrus glaucus (Rottb.) Vahl; Mangifera glauca Rottb. (1783); Senacia glauca (Rottb.) Lam.

= Elaeodendron glaucum =

Species of flowering plant

Elaeodendron glaucum, known as නෙරලු (neralu) in Sinhala, is a species of tree in the staff vine family, Celastraceae. It is endemic to Sri Lanka, where it grows in dry forests and lowland rain forests.

The species was first described as Mangifera glauca by Christen Friis Rottbøll in 1783. In 1805 Christiaan Hendrik Persoon placed the species in genus Elaeodendron as E. glaucum.
