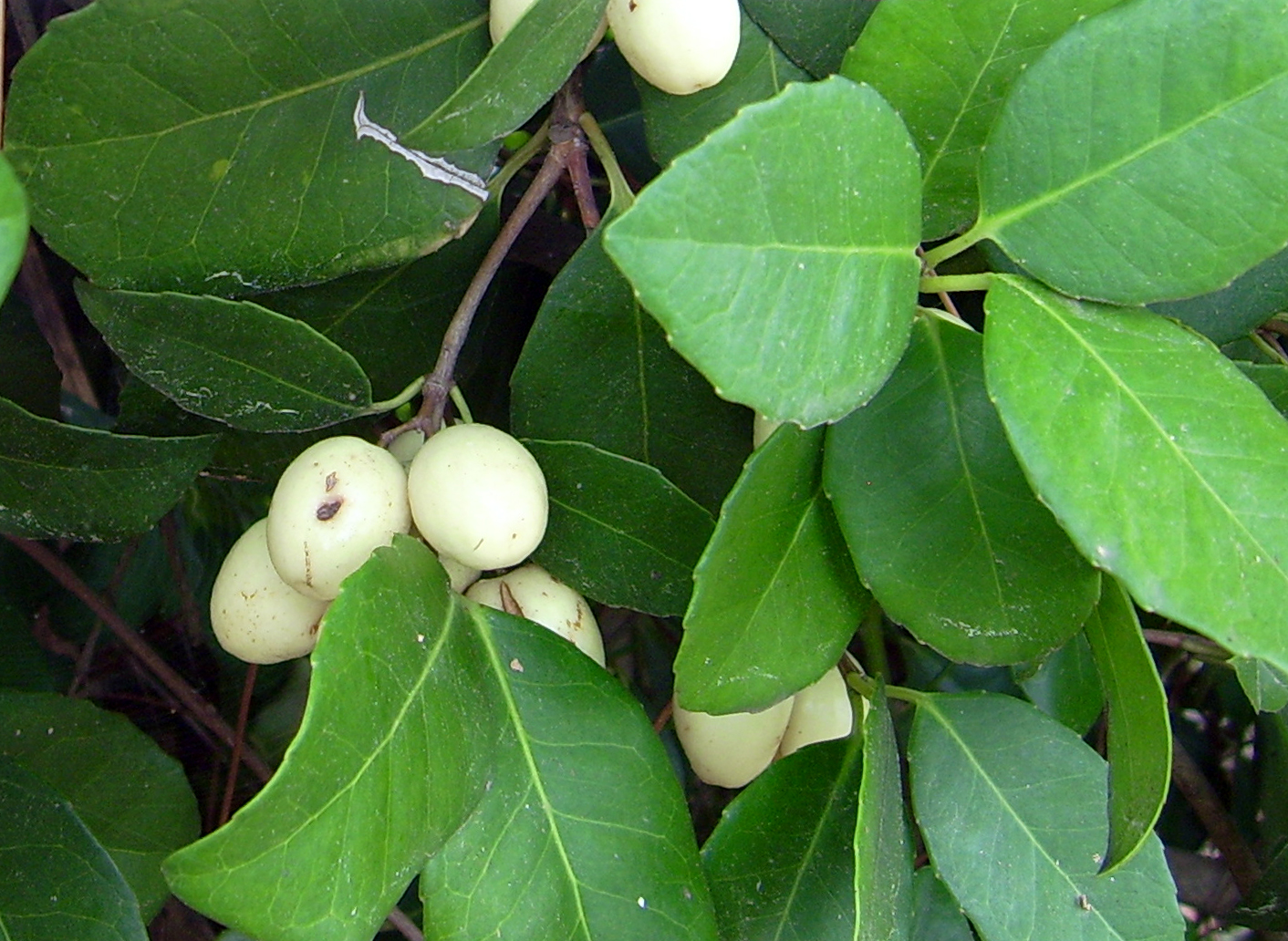
- Elaeodendron croceum

Scientific classification
- Kingdom: Plantae
- Clade: Tracheophytes
- Clade: Angiosperms
- Clade: Eudicots
- Clade: Rosids
- Order: Celastrales
- Family: Celastraceae
- Genus: Elaeodendron; Jacq.

Species
- See text

Synonyms
- Crocoxylon Eckl. & Zeyh.; Elaeodendrum Murray; Hartogia L.f., nom. illeg.; Hartogiella Codd; Loureira Raeusch.; Neerija Roxb.; Parilia Dennst.; Portenschlagia Tratt.; Pseudocassine Bredell; Rubentia Comm. ex Juss.; Schrebera Retz., nom. illeg.; Schrebera Thunb., nom. illeg.; Telemachia Urb.

= Elaeodendron =

Genus of flowering plants

Elaeodendron is a genus of flowering plants in the staff vine family, Celastraceae. It includes 40 species native to the tropics of the Americas, sub-Saharan Africa, Asia, Australia, and the South Pacific.

== Species ==
As of March 2025, Plants of the World Online accepts the following 40 species:

- Elaeodendron anjouanense H.Perrier
- Elaeodendron aquifolium (Fiori) Chiov.
- Elaeodendron australe Vent.
- Elaeodendron brachycremastron Guillaumin
- Elaeodendron buchananii (Loes.) Loes.
- Elaeodendron bupleuroides (Guillaumin) R.H.Archer
- Elaeodendron croceum (Thunb.) DC.
- Elaeodendron cunninghamii Montrouz.
- Elaeodendron curtipendulum Endl.
- Elaeodendron ehrenbergii Urb.
- Elaeodendron ellipticum Decne.
- Elaeodendron fruticosum N.Robson
- Elaeodendron glaucum (Rottb.) Pers.
- Elaeodendron gymnosporoides Baker
- Elaeodendron humbertii H.Perrier
- Elaeodendron kamerunense (Loes.) Villiers
- Elaeodendron lanceolatum Urb. & Ekman
- Elaeodendron laneanum A.H.Moore
- Elaeodendron lycioides Baker
- Elaeodendron matabelicum Loes.
- Elaeodendron melanocarpum F.Muell.
- Elaeodendron nipense Bisse
- Elaeodendron nitidulum Baker
- Elaeodendron orientale Jacq.
- Elaeodendron paniculatum Wight & Arn.
- Elaeodendron papillosum Hochst.
- Elaeodendron parvifolium R.H.Archer
- Elaeodendron pauciflorum Tul.
- Elaeodendron pilosum Baker
- Elaeodendron pininsulare Hürl.
- Elaeodendron schinoides Spreng.
- Elaeodendron schlechterianum (Loes.) Loes.
- Elaeodendron schweinfurthianum (Loes.) Loes.
- Elaeodendron trachycladum Baker
- Elaeodendron transvaalense (Burtt Davy) R.H.Archer
- Elaeodendron vaccinioides Baker
- Elaeodendron viburnifolium (Juss.) Merr.
- Elaeodendron vitiense A.C.Sm.
- Elaeodendron xylocarpum (Vent.) DC.
- Elaeodendron zeyheri Turcz.

=== Formerly placed in Elaeodendron ===
- Cassine laneana (A.H.Moore) J.Ingram (as E. laneanum)
- Euonymus fortunei (Turcz.) Hand.-Mazz. (as E. fortunei Turcz.)
- Flindersia maculosa (Lindl.) F.Muell. (as E. maculosum Lindl.)
- Maytenus quadrangulata (Schrad.) Loes. (as E. quadrangulatum (Schrad.) Reissek)
