= Elaeodendron viburnifolium =

Conservation status
- Least Concern (IUCN 3.1)

Scientific classification
- Kingdom: Plantae
- Clade: Tracheophytes
- Clade: Angiosperms
- Clade: Eudicots
- Clade: Rosids
- Order: Celastrales
- Family: Celastraceae
- Genus: Elaeodendron
- Species: E. viburnifolium

Binomial name
- Elaeodendron viburnifolium (Juss.) Merr.

Synonyms
- Aegiphila viburnifolia Juss.; Cassine viburnifolia (Juss.) Ding Hou; Elaeodendron subrotundum King; Euonymus viburnifolius (Juss.) Merr.

Species of plant

Elaeodendron viburnifolium is a species of flowering plant in the staff vine family, Celastraceae. It is a mangrove native to tropical Asia. The specific epithet viburnifolium refers to how the plant's leaves resemble those of the genus Viburnum.

The species was first described as Aegiphila viburnifolia by Antoine Laurent de Jussieu in 1806. In 1920 Elmer Drew Merrill placed the species in genus Elaeodendron as E. viburnifolium.

== Description ==
Elaeodendron viburnifolium grows as a shrub or small tree up to 10 metres (30 ft) tall and with a trunk diameter of up to 20 cm (8 in). The smooth bark is yellowish grey. The flowers are white. The fruits are obovoid in shape.

== Distribution and habitat ==
Elaeodendron viburnifolium is native to the Andaman Islands, Nicobar Islands, Myanmar, Thailand, Peninsular Malaysia, Sumatra, Borneo, the Philippines, and Sulawesi. Its habitat is tidal rivers and mangrove channels.
