= Craig Santos Perez =

Chamoru writer and educator (born 1980)

Dr. Craig Santos Perez
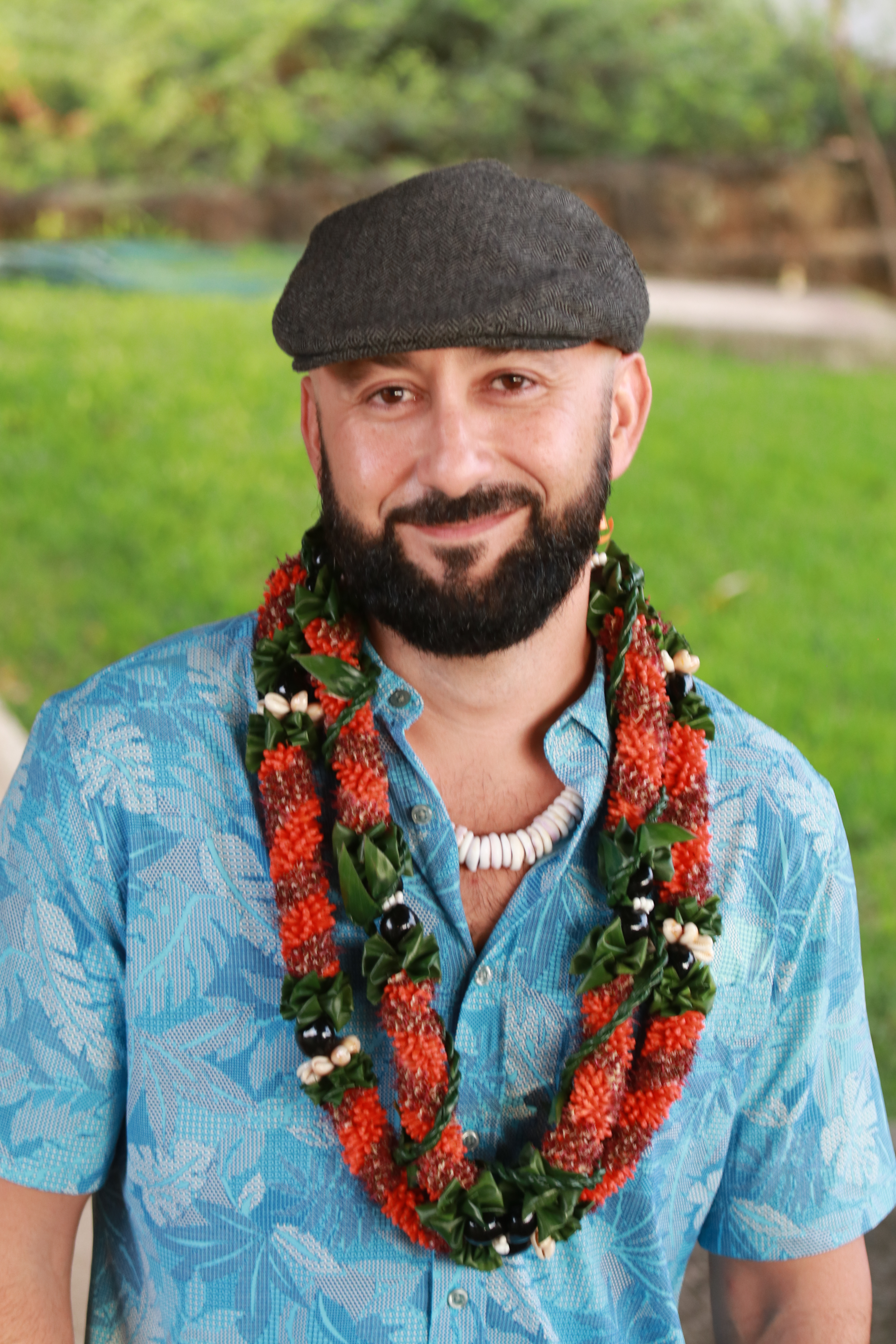
- Santos Perez at the Bishop Museum in Hawaii (October 26, 2022)
- Born: February 6, 1980 (age 46); Mongmong-Toto-Maite, Guåhan (Guam)
- Education: University of Redlands (BA); University of San Francisco (MFA) in Creative Writing; University of California, Berkeley (MA) and (PhD) in Comparative Ethnic Studies
- Spouse: Brandy Nālani McDougall (div. 2022)
- Partner: Olivia Quintanilla
- Website: craigsantosperez.com

Craig Santos Perez (born February 6, 1980) is a poet, essayist, former university professor, and publisher from the Chamorro people, born in Mongmong-Toto-Maite, Guam Island. His poetry has received multiple awards, including the 2023 National Book Award, a 2015 American Book Award and the 2011 PEN Center USA Literary Award for Poetry.

== Biography ==
Having grown up in a bilingual environment in Guam, Santos Perez moved with his family from Guam to California, United States, in 1995. He has stated in an interview: "When my family migrated to California, and when I left my family to attend college, Chamorro became nearly non-existent in my life. Because poetry became a way for me to stay connected to memories of home, and a space where I could learn and write about my cultural history, the Chamorro language started to reappear in small ways. I do not have a formula for how this happens; it just happens intuitively. Though I have noticed that most of the Chamorro words that enter into my poetry are words from the natural word, or prayers. Still today, my poetry is written predominantly in English, but I hope that someday Chamorro will become a fuller part of my life and my poetry."

He received his MFA in creative writing from the University of San Francisco in 2006.

In 2011, together with Brandy Nālani McDougall, he co-founded the publishing house of Ala Press, specializing in the dissemination of literature and culture of the Pacific Islands.

== Poetry ==
In 2008, he began the publication of his series of interconnected books, from unincorporated territory with the first book hacha. He has stated that part of the purpose of this series is to "create counter-mapping to subvert [colonial] maps." Perez's poetry focuses on the themes of Pacific life, immigration to the US, the colonial history of the Pacific Islands and the various diasporas of Pacific Islanders.

As Michael Lujan Bevacqua says in a review essay for the academic journal Transmotion: "Perez seeks to turn the reader away from those mythical maps of modernity, whereby inclusion and assimilation lead to viability and universality. He seeks to push them in new directions not beset by those limiting politics of recognition. While his colonial citations challenge, he includes a number of native Chamorro citations as well, which change from conversations with his grandparents to discussions of Chamorro culture during different epochs. The Chamorro language often provides the basis for these alternative paths, like echoing sonar, leading us through layers of language and time." By contrast, Brandy Nālani McDougall in the Routledge Companion to Native American Literature emphasizes Perez's "diasporic experience as a Chamoru."

Poetry by Santos Perez was included in UPU, a curation of Pacific Island writers’ work which was first presented at the Silo Theatre as part of the Auckland Arts Festival in March 2020. UPU was remounted as part of the Kia Mau Festival in Wellington in June 2021.

== Publications ==
=== Poetry ===
- 2024: Call This Mutiny: Uncollected Poems, Omnidawn Publishing
- 2023: from unincorporated territory [åmot], Omnidawn Publishing
- 2020: Habitat Threshold, Omnidawn Publishing.
- 2017: from unincorporated territory [lukao], Omnidawn Publishing
- 2014: from unincorporated territory [guma'], Omnidawn Publishing
- 2010: from unincorporated territory [saina], Omnidawn Publishing
- 2008: from unincorporated territory [hacha], Tinfish Press (reprinted by Omnidawn Publishing, 2017)
- 2007: Constellations gathered along the ecliptic, Shadowbox Press

=== In Anthology ===
- 2019: Native Voices: Indigenous American Poetry, Craft and Conversations. Eds. Cmarie Fuhrman and Dean Rader. Tupelo Press.
- 2018: Ghost Fishing: An Eco-Justice Poetry Anthology. Ed. Melissa Tuckey. University of Georgia Press.

=== Essays ===
- 2011, "Surviving Our Fallen: Chamorros, Militarism, Religiosity, and 9/11," Conversations at the Wartime Coffee: A Decade of War: 2001-2011, Ed. Sean Labrador y Manzano.
- 2011, "The Poetics of Mapping Diaspora, Navigating Culture, and Being From," Doveglion Literary Journal (online).
- 2011, "Signs of Being: Chamoru Poetry and Cecilia C. T. Perez," Jacket2 Magazine.
- 2011, "Whitewashing American Hybrid Aesthetics," The Monkey and the Wrench: Essays in Contemporary Poetics. Akron: U of Akron Press.
- 2011, "Why are White Editors So Mean?" Jacket2 Magazine.
- 2010, "Brandy Nālani McDougall's The Wind Salt / Ka Makani Pa'akai" (review), Studies in American Indian Literatures 22.3 (2010): 84-92.

=== As an editor ===
- Jetñil-Kijiner, Kathy; Kava, Leora; Perez, Craig Santos, eds. (2022). Indigenous Pacific Islander Eco-Literatures. Honolulu: University of Hawaii Press. ISBN 9780824891046. OCLC 1099796843.
- Perez, Craig Santos, ed. (2023-07-31). New CHamoru Literature. University of Hawaii Press. ISBN 9780824897253. OCLC 1414208045.

=== Awards and distinctions ===
- 2023 National Book Award for Poetry for from unincorporated territory [åmot]
- 2022 MLA Prize in Native American Literature, Cultures, and Languages
- 2020 ACLS Mellon/Scholars and Society Fellow
- 2017 The Elliot Cades Award for Literature
- 2016 Chancellor's Citation for Meritorious Teaching at the University of Hawaii
- 2016 Lannan Foundation Literary Fellowship for Poetry
- 2015 American Book Award
- 2011 PEN Center USA Award
- 2011 The Los Angeles Times Book Prize
- 2010 The Poets & Writers California Writers Exchange Award
- 2009 Emily Chamberlain Cook Poetry Award from the University of Berkeley
- 2008 Literary Prize for Poetry
- 2007 Eugene Cota-Robles Fellowship Scholarship, awarded by University of California, Berkeley
- 2001 The Jean Burden Poetry Award issued by the University of Redland

=== Articles and interviews ===
- 2019, "Poet to Poet Interview: Rajiv Mohabir and Craig Santos Perez, for Kenyon Review.
- 2017, "Love Poems in the Time of Climate Change," for New Republic, 248, no. 5001.
- 2016, "The Pacific Written Tradition," for the Cream City Review, v40 n118.
- 2015, "Transterritorial Currents and the Imperial Terripelago," for the American Quarterly, v67 n319.
- 2015, "Letters and a 12-Step Program," for the newspaper Amerasia, 41, no. 320.
- 2015, from "Understory," for the Colorado Review, v42 n221 (Summer) pp. 152–154.
- 2011, "The basic savagery of the White Poets Society," in Jacket2.
- 2010, ginen "AERIAL ROOTS", for the Iowa Review, v40 n223.
- 2009, "Picture Palace by Stephanie Young" (review), for the Colorado Review, v36 n324 (Fall/Winter) pp. 163–167.
- 2009, "Duende by Tracy K. Smith" (review), for the Colorado Review, v36 n125 (Spring) pp. 179–182.
