= Poet Laureate of Hawaii =

Official poet of Hawaii

- Incumbent; Lee Tonouchi since 2026
- Type: Poet laureate
- Appointer: Hawaiʻi State Foundation on Culture and the Arts, Hawaii Council for the Humanities, and Hawaiʻi State Public Library System
- Term length: Three years
- Constituting instrument: Gubernatorial proclamation (2012); S.C.R. 83 (2022)
- Formation: May 3, 2012
- First holder: Kealoha
- Salary: US$50,000 per year (grant)
- Website: sfca.hawaii.gov

The poet laureate of Hawaii is the official poet of the U.S. state of Hawaii. The position was created in 2012, when Governor Neil Abercrombie proclaimed Kealoha the state's first poet laureate. Proposals for the title date back to 1929, when a bill to create the post was tabled in the territorial legislature, and various writers had been proposed as the poet laureate. At first a ceremonial title conferred by the governor, the position was restructured in 2022 and placed under the joint administration of the Hawaiʻi State Foundation on Culture and the Arts, the Hawaii Council for the Humanities, and the Hawaiʻi State Public Library System. The current poet laureate is Lee Tonouchi, who began his term in February 2026.

== History ==
A poet laureate program for Hawaii was first proposed in February 1929, when Representative John C. Anderson introduced a bill to create such a program. The legislation was tabled a month later, with Representative Clemen Gomes describing the bill as having "worn this committee almost to exhaustion." Despite this, The Honolulu Advertiser dubbed Charles Eugene Banks the states "unofficial poet laureate." Several years later, the Honolulu Star-Bulletin referred to Don Blanding as "Hawaii's poet laureate." In 1945 the Poets of The Pacific, a San Francisco-based group, named Lloyd Stone the "Poet Laureate of Hawaii." A house concurrent resolution introduced in the 1951 Hawaii Territorial Legislature would have officially recognized Stone with this title, but it failed to pass.

The modern poet laureate program began in 2012, when Governor Neil Abercrombie named Kealoha the state's first official poet laureate. This made Hawaii the 43rd state to proclaim a poet laureate. Initially, the role was a purely ceremonial one decided by the Governor. In 2022, the Hawaii State Legislature adopted a resolution granting control of the poet laureate program to the Hawaii Council for the Humanities, the Hawaiʻi State Foundation on Culture and the Arts, and the Hawaiʻi State Public Library System. Those organizations were directed to collaborate to establish eligibility requirements, duties, and grant funding for the poet laureate, in addition. Additionally, a three-year term for poets laureate was established by the legislation.

Nominations for the position were opened in June 2022. Also in 2022, Kealoha was awarded a $50,000 grant by the Academy of American Poets to support his work as poet laureate. The second poet laureate, Brandy Nālani McDougall, was announced in 2023. She too received a grant from the Academy of American Poets in support of her work. McDougall's term expired in 2025 and the state opened nominations for the third laureate, who was announced as Lee Tonouchi in February 2026. Tonouchi was the first poet laureate to work in the Hawaiian Pidgin language. Like his predecessors, Tonouchi was awarded $50,000 by the Academy of American Poets.

== Eligibility and duties ==
In order to be eligible for the position of poet laureate, a person must be a full-time and legal resident of Hawaii and available to travel statewide. They additionally must have a professional body of work, at least ten years experience writing poetry, at least three years of education experience, a commitment to Hawaiian culture and communities, and a history of community service. The poet laureate is awarded a $25,000 grant for each year of their term by the state.

Throughout their term, the poet laureate is expected to participate in at least eight public readings a year throughout the state, lead at least four poetry workshops, organize at least one reading featuring other poets, and serve as a spokesperson and representative of the program.

== List of poets laureate ==
Poets Laureate of Hawaiʻi
#	Portrait	Name	Term	Reference
1		Kealoha	2012–2022	
2		Brandy Nālani McDougall	2023–2025	
3		Lee Tonouchi	2026–2029	

== See also ==
- Poet laureate
- List of U.S. state poets laureate
- United States Poet Laureate
