= Sakae Takahashi =

Sakae Takahashi may refer to:

- Sakae Takahashi (footballer)
- Sakae Takahashi (politician)
