= Mabel Hashisaka =

American businessman

Mabel Hashisaka (née Kawakami) is an American business owner from Hawaii. In 2016 she received Makana Hooko no Ke Ola, a Lifetime Achievement Award from the Small Business Association of Hawaii.

== Biography ==
Hashisaka was born in Lihue, Hawaii in 1928. Her father had emigrated from Japan in 1905. She attended Waimea High School, graduating in 1946. She then studied at the University of Hawaiʻi, graduating with a degree in psychology and Indiana University, where she earned a master’s degree in education. She initially worked as a teacher on the Big Island.

In 1965 she founded Kauai Kookie from a small kitchen in Waimea. The business produced small cookies marketed to Japanese visitors to Kauai who wished to take gifts from the area back to Japan, in a tradition known as omiyage. The first product was based on the recipe for chocolate macadamia-nut shortbread borrowed from a friend of Hashisaka's. As the business grew, the bakery moved to larger premises in Hanapepe and began producing a wider range of biscuits and cookies.
