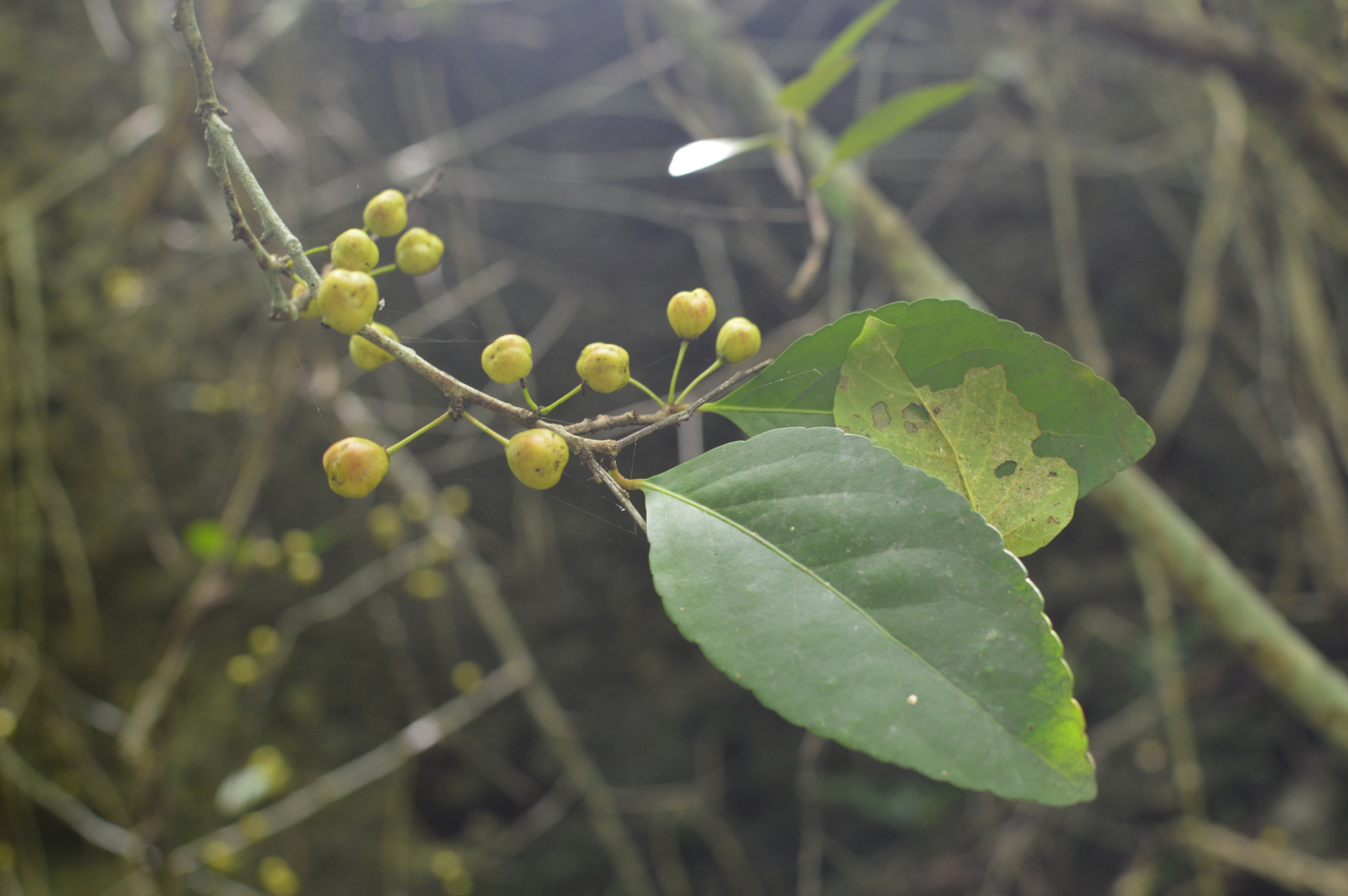
- Leaves and immature fruits, Saipan, Commonwealth of the Northern Mariana Islands

Scientific classification
- Kingdom: Plantae
- Clade: Embryophytes
- Clade: Tracheophytes
- Clade: Angiosperms
- Clade: Eudicots
- Clade: Rosids
- Order: Celastrales
- Family: Celastraceae
- Genus: Gymnosporia
- Species: G. thompsonii

Binomial name
- Gymnosporia thompsonii Merr.

Synonyms
- Maytenus thompsonii Merr. Celastrus marianensis Koidz. Gymnosporia palauica Loes. Maytenus palauica Loes.

= Gymnosporia thompsonii =

Gymnosporia thompsonii (Luluhut)

Species of flowering plant

Gymnosporia thompsonii (CHamorro: luluhot) is a species of plant in the bittersweet family Celastraceae. It is endemic to the Mariana and Caroline Islands where it grows as a many-stemmed understory shrub or small tree in karst forests.

Some authorities refer to the species as Maytenus thompsonii.

== Description ==
Gymnosporia thompsonii leaves are shiny with wavy margins and have a distinctive red petiole. Flowers are small, white or cream-colored, occurring in clusters at the base of leaves. The fruits turn from green to red, and after drying to a brown color they dehisce to expose 3 seeds.

Gymnosporia thompsonii can grow up to 13 feet tall and form impenetrable thickets.

== Ecology ==
Gymnosporia thompsonii was thought to have served as the larval host plant to the endangered Mariana wandering butterfly (Vagrans egistina), since it had been observed on the plant on both Guam and Rota. However, the butterfly has not been observed on Guam since 1979, nor on Rota since 1995.

== Conservation status ==
The plant faces threats from land use changes, ungulate browsing, and invasive plants. Its conservation status has not yet been assessed by the IUCN. It is grown in the University of Guam's Island Conservation Lab to support conservation and restoration efforts. The lab has encouraged the use of Gymnosporia thompsonii as an ornamental landscaping shrub in either sunny or shaded conditions.

== Uses ==
The plant has been used by Chamorro healers (yo’åmte) as a treatment for urinary tract infections and sore throats. Its wood is used for fuel.

== Gallery ==
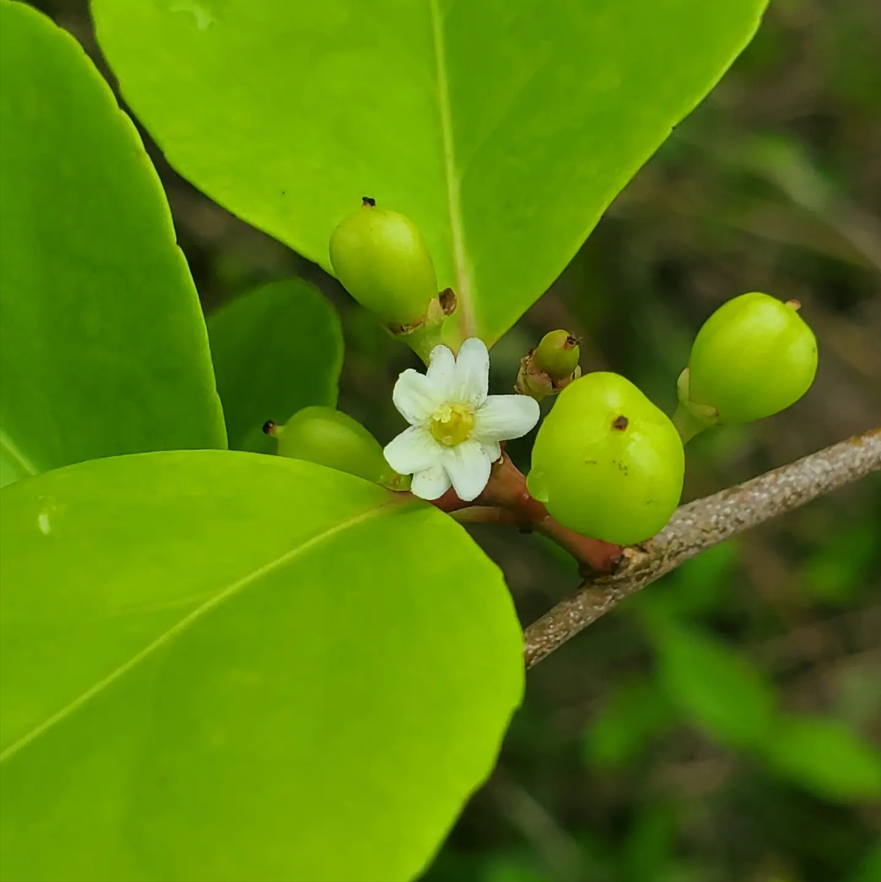
Gymnosporia thompsonii flower and fruits, Dededo, Guam

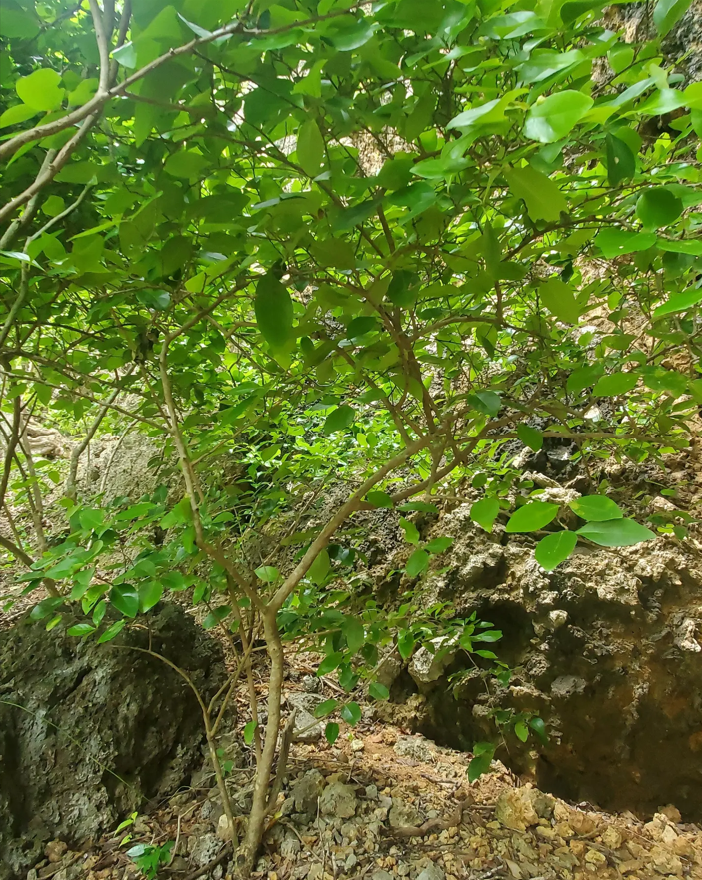
Gymnosporia thompsonii, Talofofo, Guam

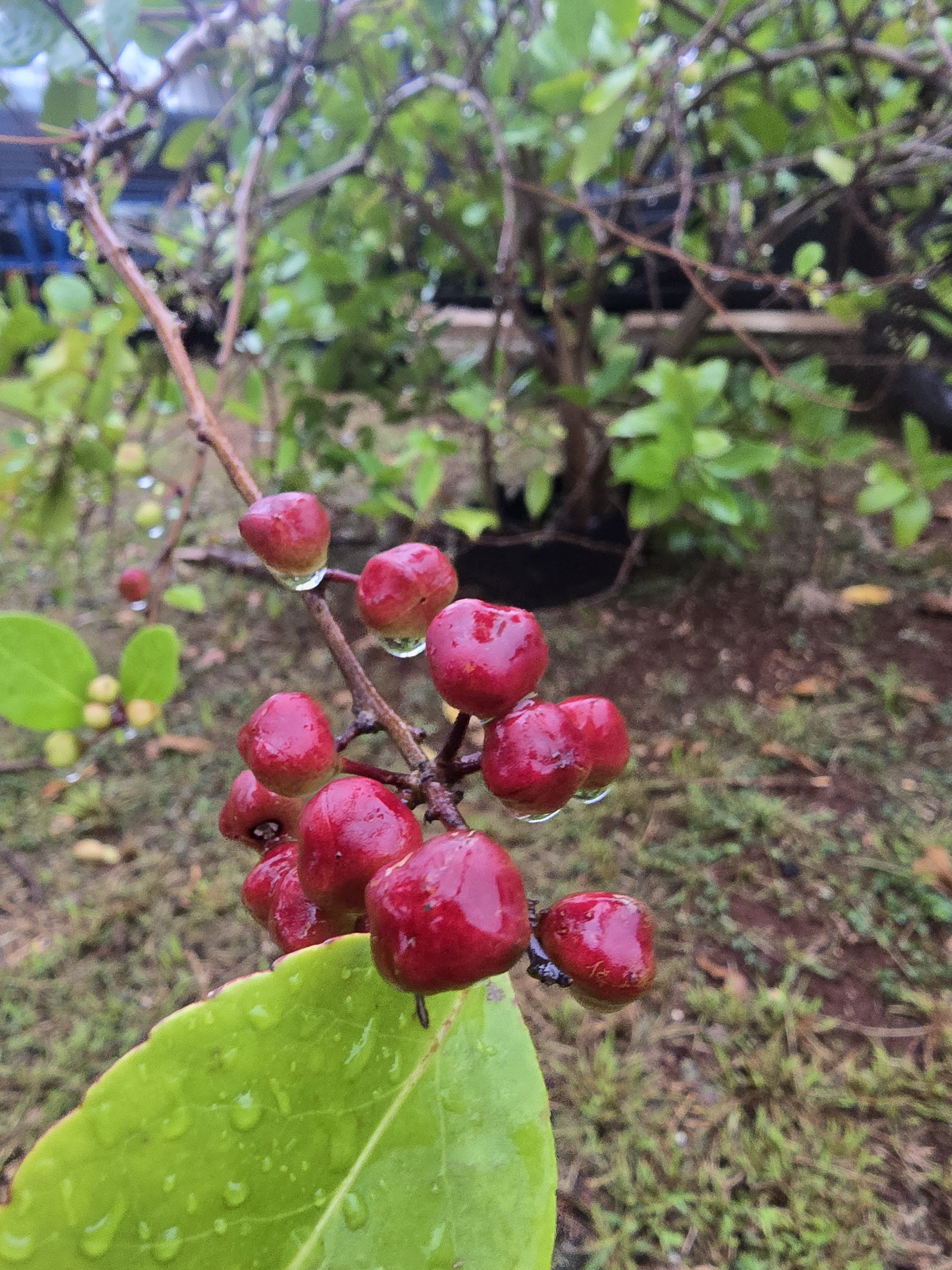
Gymnosporia thompsonii mature fruit, Guam

== See also ==
List of endemic plants in the Mariana Islands
