= Thomas Iannucci =

American writer and rapper

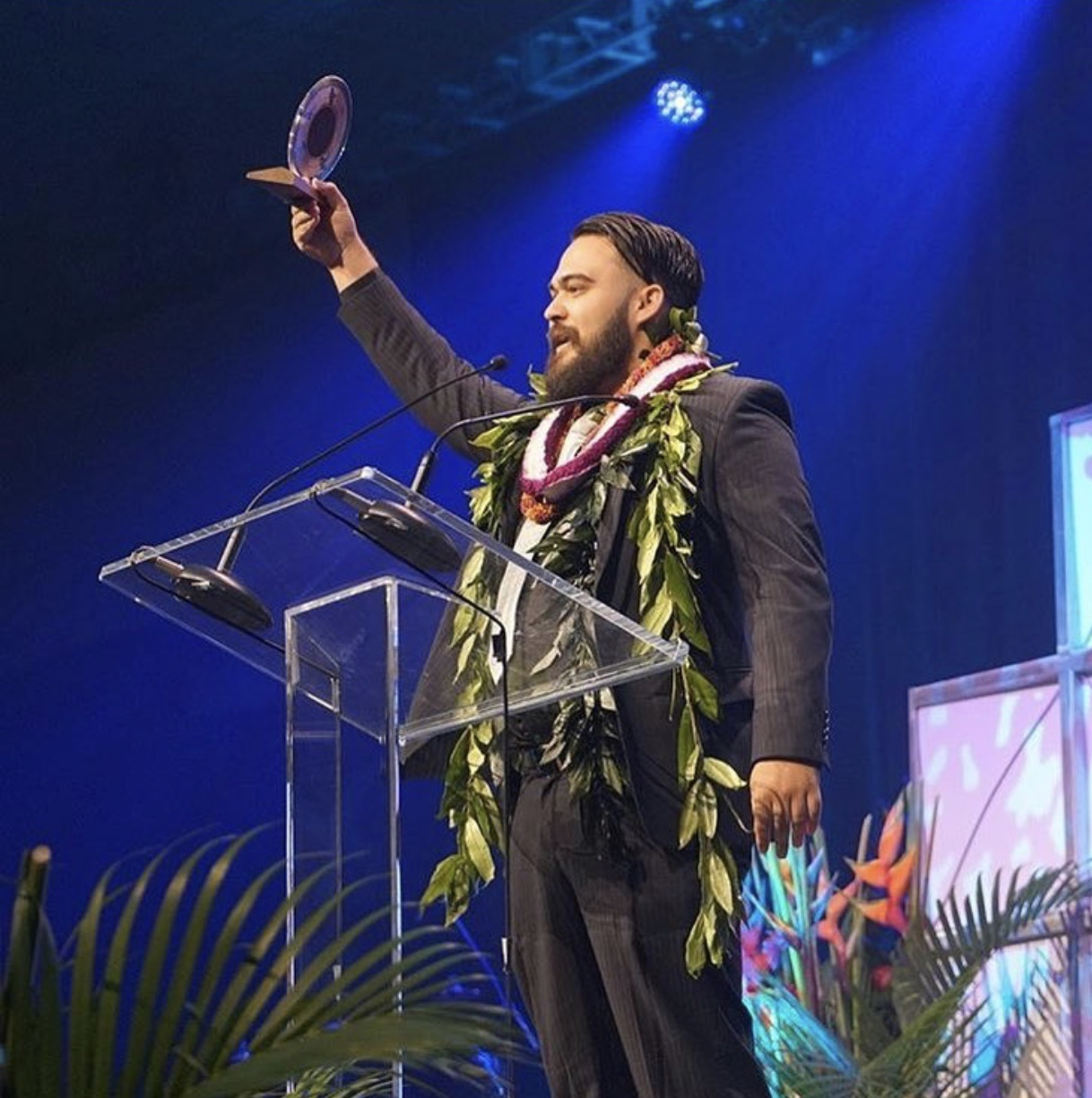
- Iannucci in 2018

Background information
- Also known as: Illtalian
- Born: Honolulu, Hawaii
- Origin: Kaua’i, Hawaii
- Genres: Hip hop, conscious hip hop, boom bap, lo-fi
- Occupations: Rapper, writer
- Label: Ends of the Earth

Thomas Iannucci (often stylized in all-lowercase), is a three-time Nā Hōkū Hanohano award-winning rapper, writer, and poet from Kaua’i, Hawaii. Iannucci has been the recipient of several notable awards, including the Nā Hōkū Hanohano Awards for Best Alternative Album in 2015 (for his work with Streetlight Cadence), Best Hip Hop Album in 2018 and 2020, as well as the Best Hip Hop Song (Finalist) in the 2016 National John Lennon Songwriting Contest. Iannucci is an outspoken advocate for social issues within Hawaii, and was named by KHON2 News as part of the next generation of rappers pushing the limits of Hawaii Hip Hop. He is also an author, making his fiction debut in 2023 when his piece “Hā’ule Hau” was published in New Zealand-based literary journal Takahē Magazine. He has since been published across Hawaii, in places like Honolulu (magazine), Bamboo Ridge (Hawaii's most prestigious literary journal), and the Hawaii Review of Books, which named him a "rising Pidgin star" and a "serious writer of fiction and creative non-fiction." He and his work have been featured, profiled, or quoted in various mainstream media outlets, including Vulture (website)/New York (magazine), Deadline Hollywood, Us Weekly, Daily Mirror, and Hot 97.

== Early life ==
Iannucci began rapping in high school, under the name Illtalian. In 2018, he dropped the name Illtalian in favor of his birth name. Iannucci currently resides on the island of Kaua'i, and is a graduate of Waimea High School and the University of Hawaii at Manoa, where he received his Bachelor in American History.

== Awards and nominations ==
Iannucci has won or been nominated for several major awards, including the John Lennon Songwriting Contest, the International Songwriting Contest, and the SongDoor Songwriting Contest. Iannucci was also a member of the Rapzilla Freshman Class of 2020, wherein he won the popular vote portion of the process. In 2018, he won the Nā Hōkū Hanohano Award for Best Hip Hop Album for his album "Makana." In 2020, he was named a Rapzilla Freshman after winning the popular vote. His second album, “Kuleana,” also won the Hōkū for Hip Hop Album of the Year at the 2020 Nā Hōkū Hanohano Awards. In 2022, Iannucci's album “The Illyindé Tape” was also nominated for a Hōkū.

== Writing ==
In 2023, Iannucci made his publishing debut when his short story, "Hā'ule Hau," was published by New Zealand literary journal Takahē Magazine in their April issue, vol. 107. Later that year, his short story, "boy," was published by Bamboo Ridge, for their 45th Anniversary edition, Issue #127, and eventually was highlighted as a standout piece on their website. Due to his dynamic reading style and experimental writing (he often writes completely in Pidgin), Iannucci began to attract increased interest in his work across Hawaii, with Chris McKinney naming him alongside Megan Kamalei Kakimoto and Joseph Han as one of three “young Hawai’i authors to watch” during an interview at the Hawaii Book & Music Festival, Hawaii's biggest literary event of the year. In 2026, he signed to the Fischer-Harbage Literary Agency, announcing via press release that work had begun on his debut short story collection, tentatively titled "People Watching."

Iannucci also writes non-fiction, generally focusing on Hawaii-related themes, much like his musical output, though with a greater focus on Pidgin advocacy. In 2026, he published "Da Pidgin Pak," several cultural essays and one short story written primarily in Pidgin, in collaboration with noted Pidgin linguist and Hawaii Poet Laureate Lee Tonouchi via the Hawaii Review of Books, as well as a humorous essay for Honolulu Magazine about a night in Waikiki spent with Lilo & Stitch (2025 film) star and longtime friend Sydney Agudong.

== Discography ==
- Notti Insonni (2014)
- Makana (2017)
- Kuleana (2019)
- Doubting Thomas (2020)
- The Illyindé Tape (2021)
