= From Unincorporated Territory åmot =

2023 poem collection by Craig Santos Perez

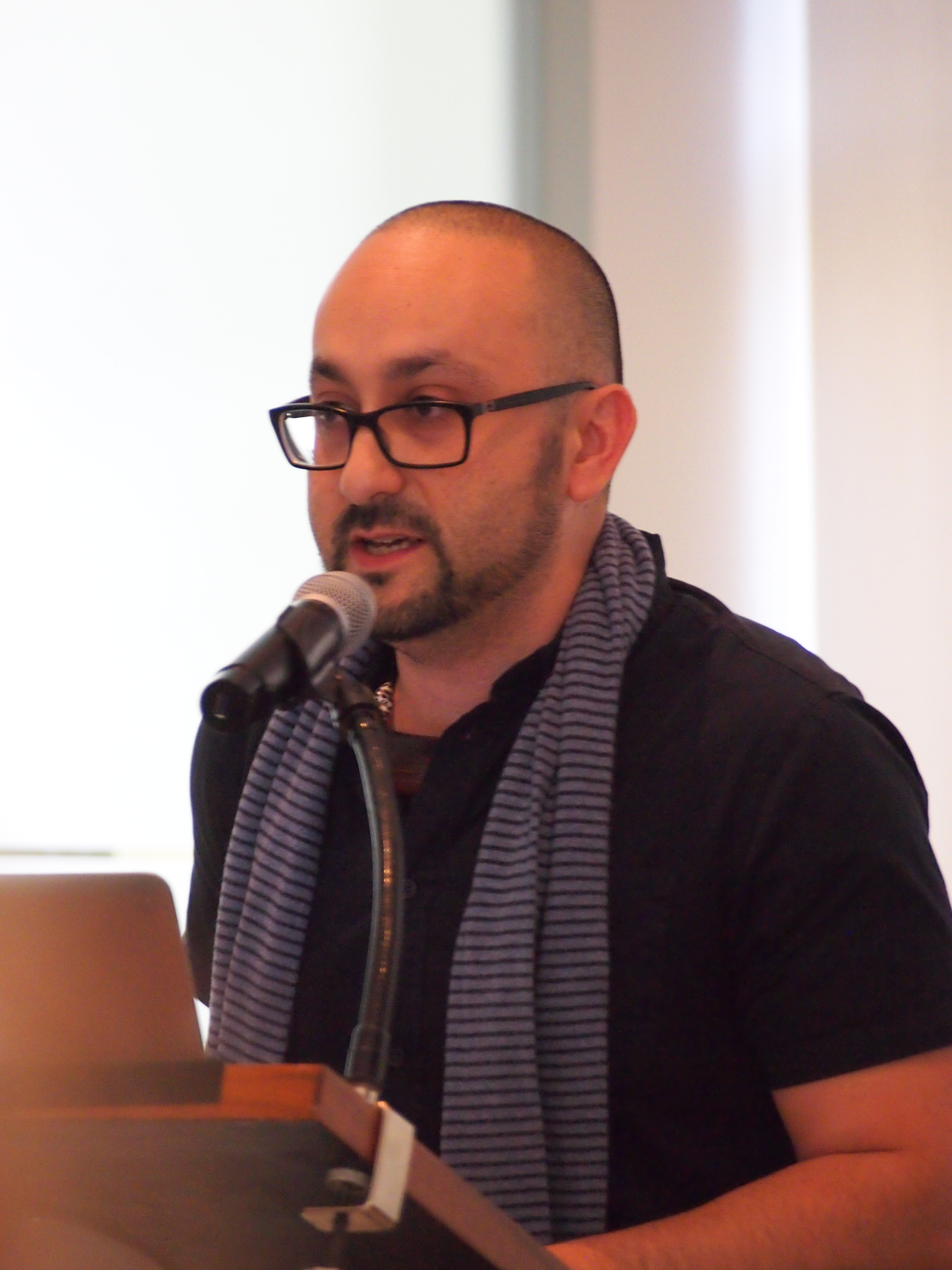
Perez in 2016

From Unincorporated Territory [åmot] is a collection of poems by Craig Santos Perez released in 2023. It is the fifth collection in Perez's "From Unincorporated Territory" series. The collection won the 2023 National Book Award for Poetry. From Unincorporated Territory [åmot] keeps with the theme other collections in the "Unincorporated Territory" series by terminating the title with a bracketed word from the Chamoru language. In this particular entry, the word "åmot" translates to "medicine."

== Description ==
From Unincorporated Territory [åmot] combines multilingualism, experimental free verse, and visual poetry, such as poems arranged in the topographical shape of the island of Guam.
