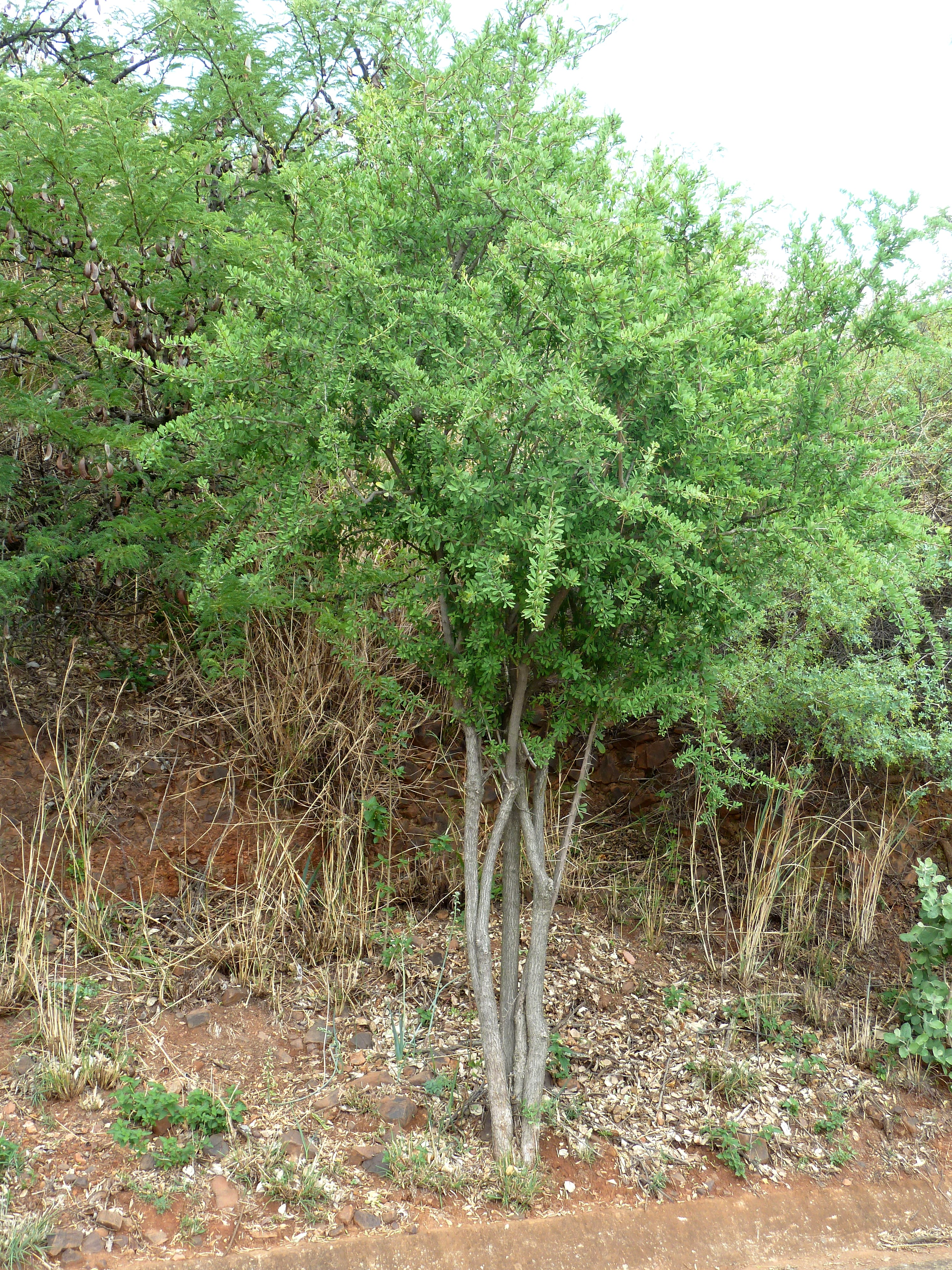

Conservation status
- Least Concern (IUCN 3.1)

Scientific classification
- Kingdom: Plantae
- Clade: Tracheophytes
- Clade: Angiosperms
- Clade: Eudicots
- Clade: Rosids
- Order: Celastrales
- Family: Celastraceae
- Genus: Gymnosporia
- Species: G. buxifolia

Binomial name
- Gymnosporia buxifolia (L.) Szyszyl. (1888)

Synonyms
- Catha buxifolia (L.) G.Don (1832); Celastrus buxifolius L. (1753); Evonymoides buxifolia (L.) Moench (1794)

= Gymnosporia buxifolia =

Species of flowering plant

Gymnosporia buxifolia is a species of plant in the bittersweet family (Celastraceae) native to southern Africa. It is commonly known as the pioneer spike-thorn or common spike-thorn. It ranges from Angola and Mozambique to South Africa.

== Description ==
Gymnosporia buxifolia is a variable evergreen shrub or tree.

=== Morphology ===
Gymnosporia buxifolia grows up to 9 metres tall. It has light brown bark that darkens with age, eventually becoming flakey, rough, corky and fissured. It may be unarmed or armed with long straight spines, up to six inches (15 centimeters) in length; the longest unbranched thorns of any Dicot, a record shared with Vachellia karroo. It needs to be added that certain cacti have spines (not thorns) which are longer. The leaves are green, slightly paler on underside, glabrous, often borne clustered on very short dwarf spur-branchlets in the axils of the spines or infrequently on young spines or arranged spirally on new growth. The leaves are variable in shape, but typically narrowly obovate to oblanceolate, 25mm to 45mm long and 10mm to 25mm wide with a toothed margin, usually on the upper half of the leaf, sometimes emarginate. Flowers are borne in heads, small, white, with strong odour. The fruit is a more or less spherical, 3 lobed capsule, about 10mm diameter, green-yellow becoming grey-brown and wrinkled when dry. It grows in forests, scrub, grassland, woodland and riverine habitats.

== Conservation ==
It is listed as Least Concern in the Redlist of South African Plants.

== Gallery ==
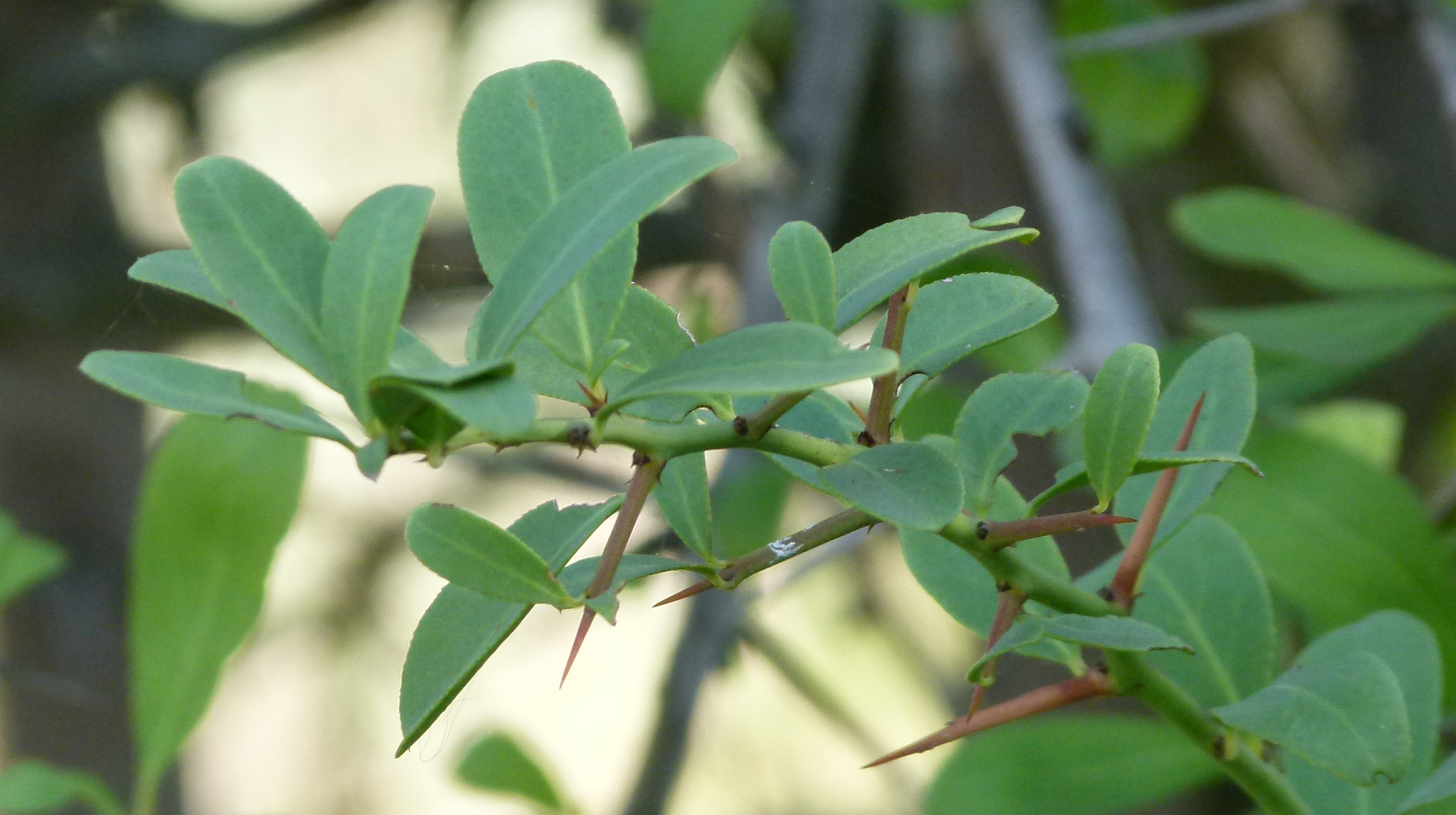
Foliage and spikes

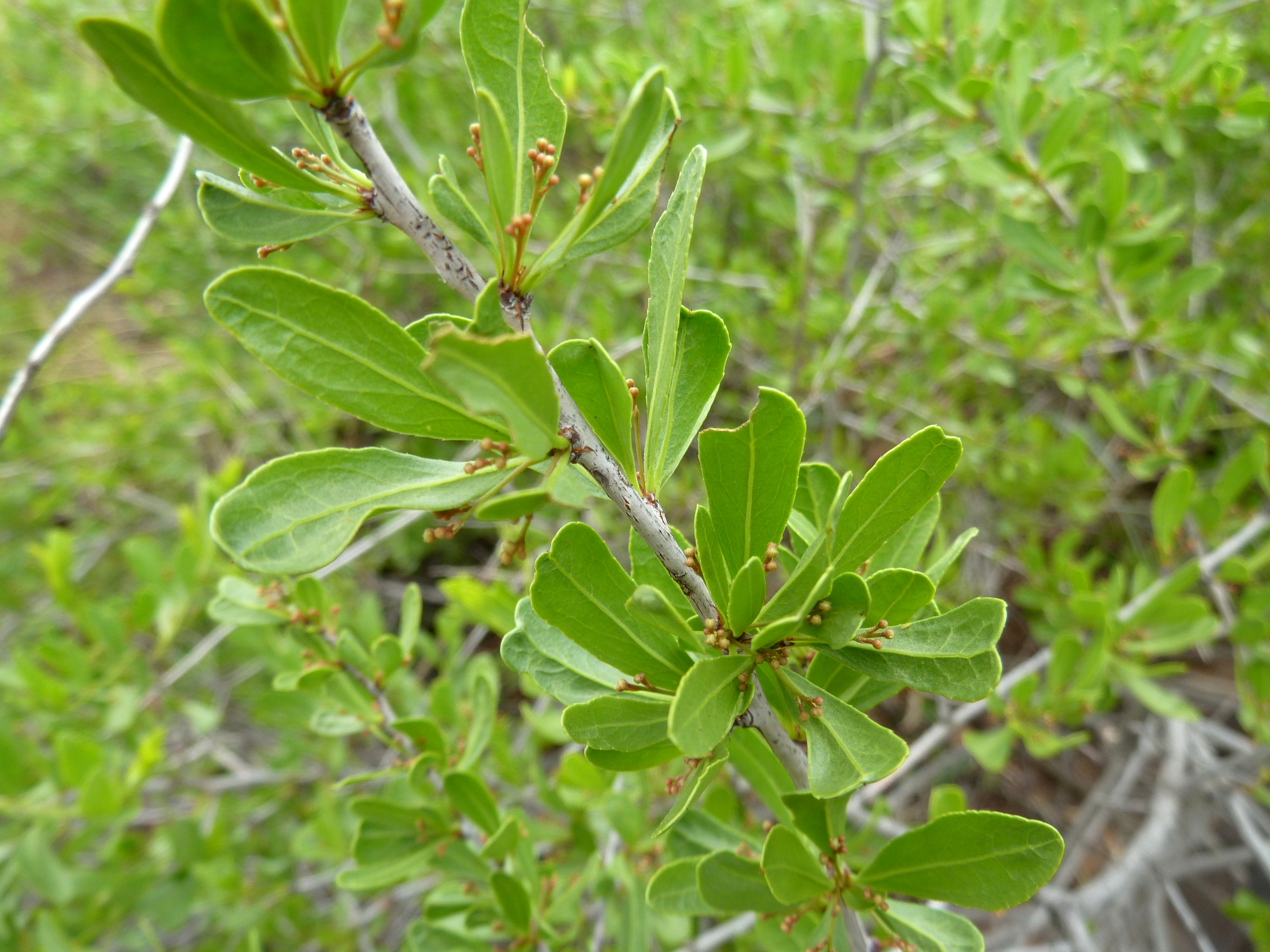
Flower buds

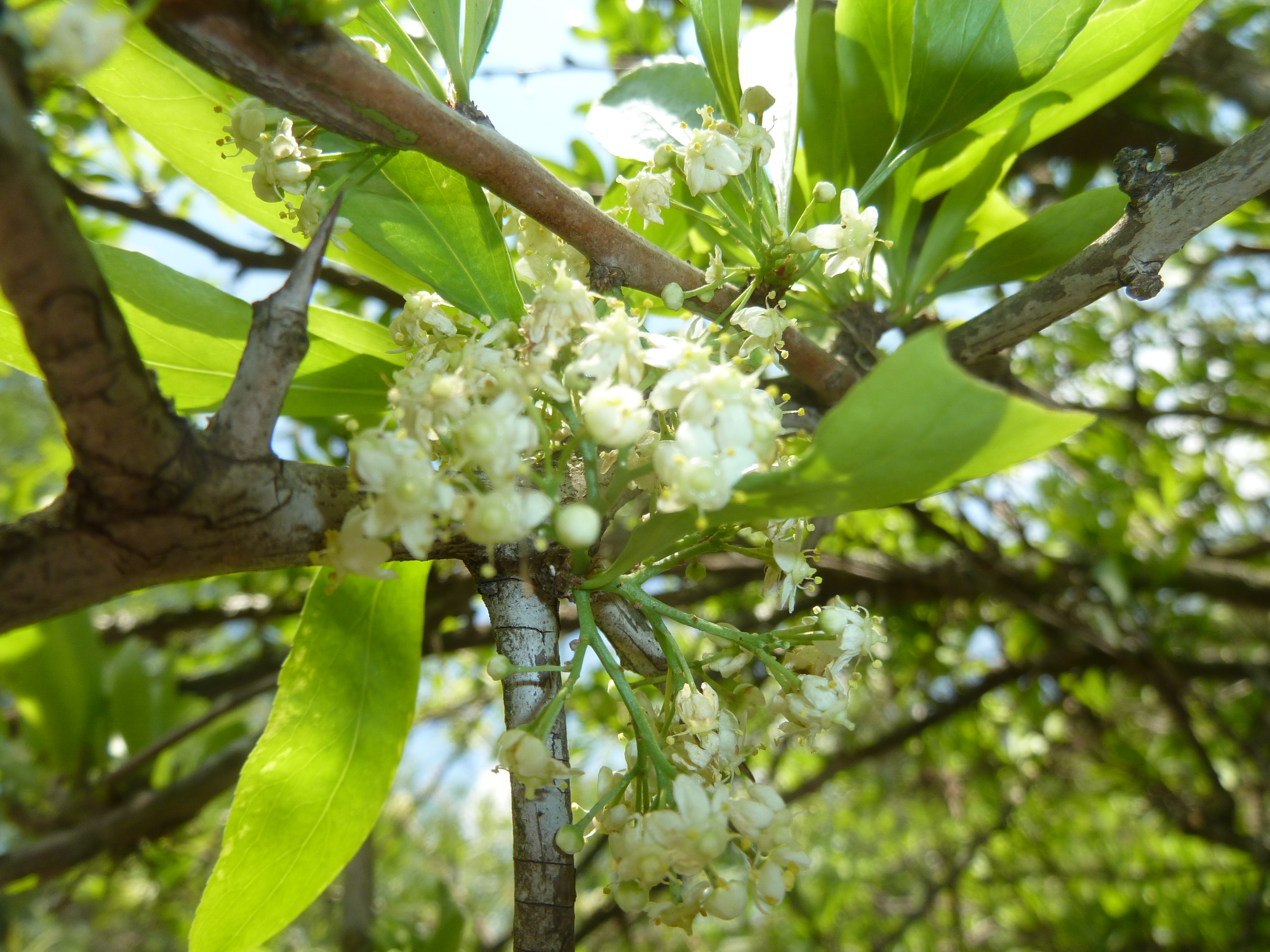
Flowering

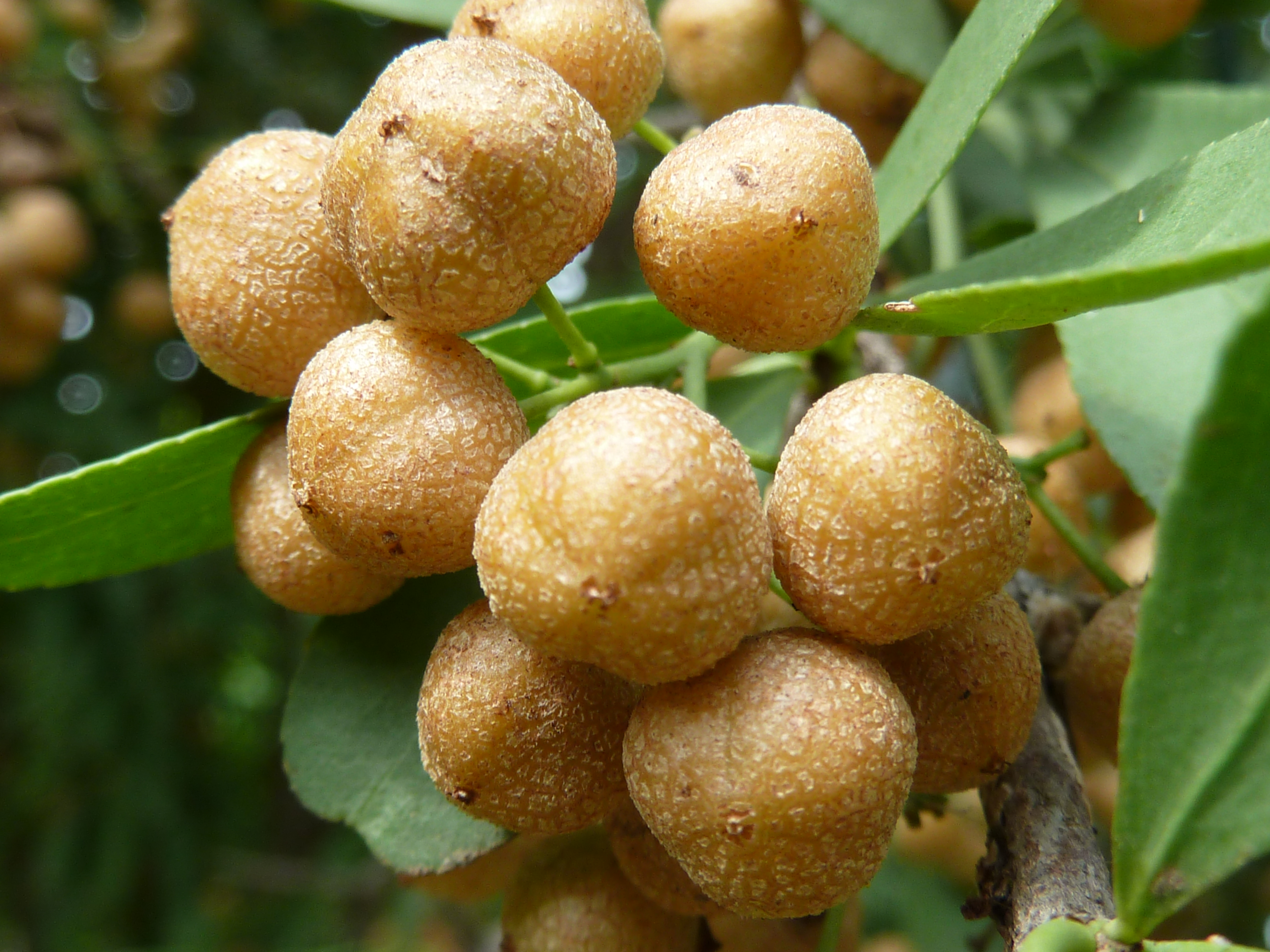
Fruit
