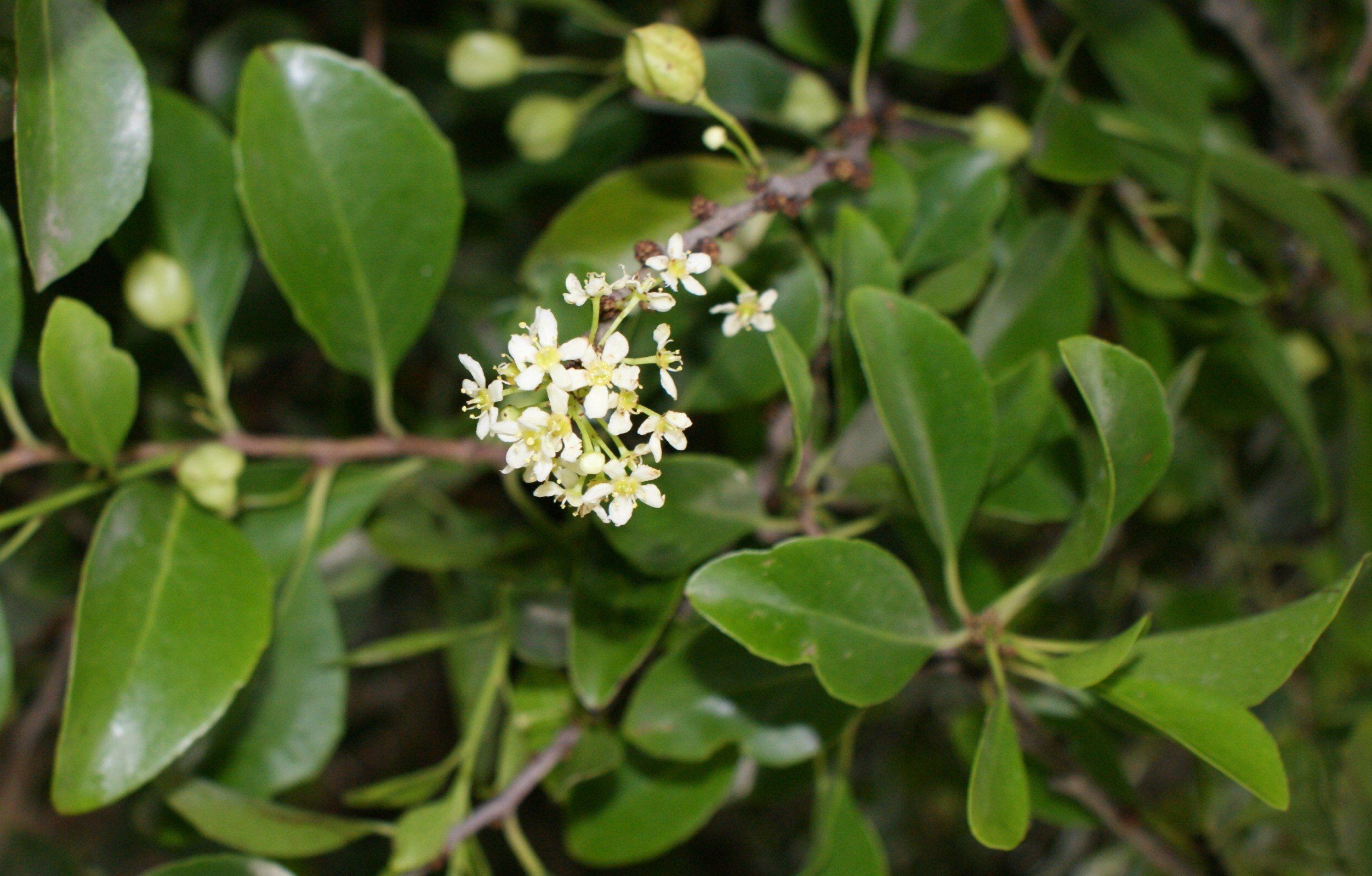

Conservation status
- Near Threatened (IUCN 3.1)

Scientific classification
- Kingdom: Plantae
- Clade: Tracheophytes
- Clade: Angiosperms
- Clade: Eudicots
- Clade: Rosids
- Order: Celastrales
- Family: Celastraceae
- Genus: Gymnosporia
- Species: G. cassinoides

Binomial name
- Gymnosporia cassinoides (L'Hér.) Masf. (1881)

Synonyms
- Catha cassinoides Webb & Berthel. (1842); Celastrus cassinoides L'Hér. (1789); Celastrus crassifolius Salisb. (1796); Maytenus canariensis (Loes.) G.Kunkel & Sunding (1971); Maytenus dryandri var. canariensis Loes. (1942)

= Gymnosporia cassinoides =

Species of flowering plant

Gymnosporia cassinoides is a species of flowering plant in the family Celastraceae. It is a near threatened shrub or tree endemic to the Canary Islands.
