= Brandy Nālani McDougall =

Hawai'i State Poet Laureate (2023–2025)

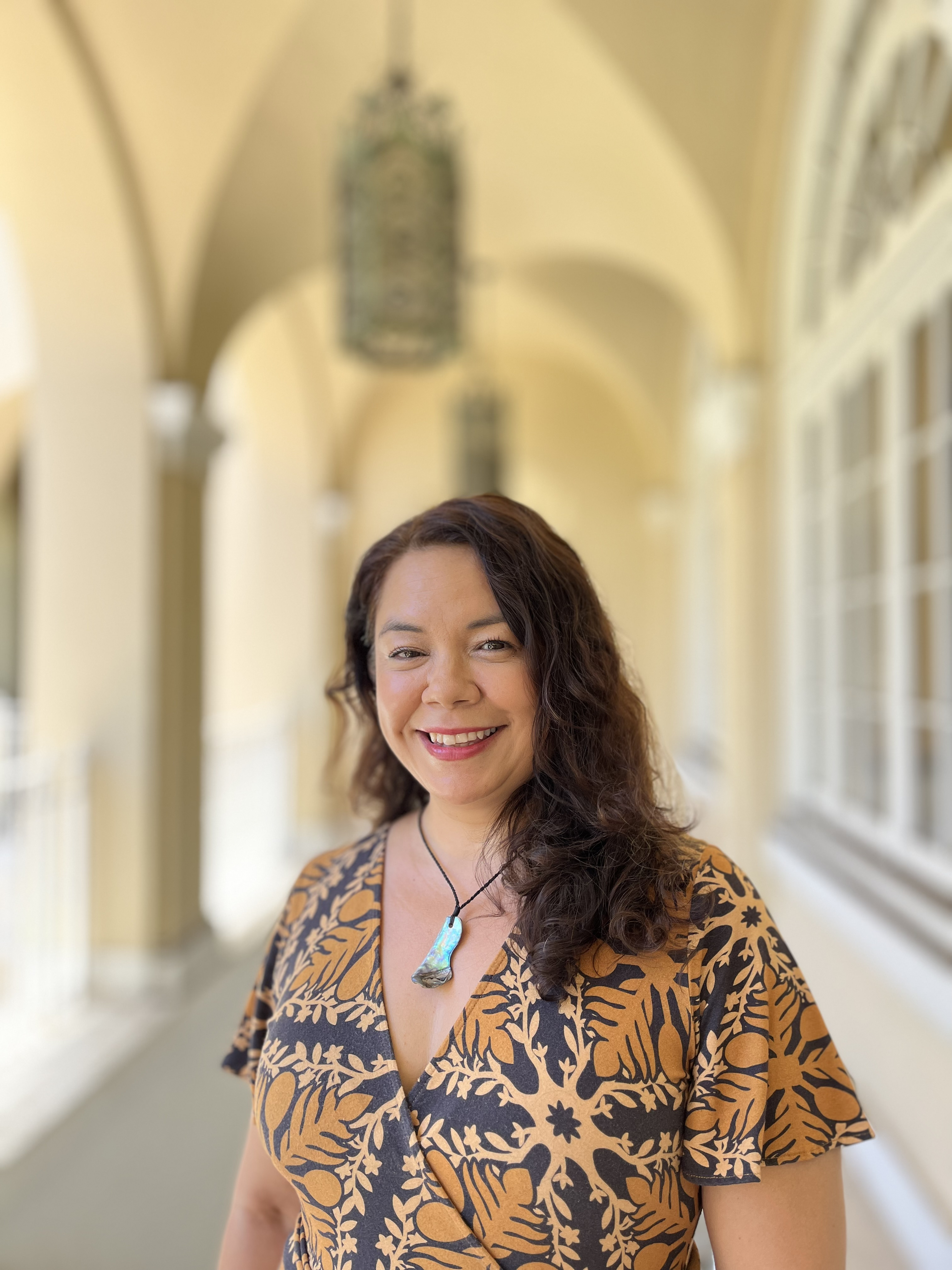
- Born: 1976
- Education: Whittier College, University of Oregon, University of Auckland, Kamehameha Schools
- Occupations: Poet, academic, writer
- Employer: University of Hawaiʻi at Mānoa
- Spouse: Craig Santos Perez
- Awards: Academy of American Poets Laureate Fellowship (2023–2025); postdoctoral researcher (Ford Foundation, 2013–2014); Fulbright Program (2002–2003)

Brandy Nālani McDougall is a Kānaka Maoli author, poet, educator, literary activist, and associate professor at the University of Hawaiʻi at Mānoa. She is the Hawai'i State Poet Laureate for 2023–2025.

== Early life and education ==
McDougall was born and raised on the island of Maui in the upcountry region of Kula. She is Kānaka Maoli with ancestral lineages to Hawaiʻi, Maui, and Kauaʻi and also has ancestry from China and Scotland. Having grown up around storytellers, McDougall has long since been exposed to moʻolelo, which comprises stories, genealogy, legend, myths, and history. Additionally, her father was a musician and a writer, which molded her understanding of poetry as a platform for her own telling of genealogy, culture, and memory. McDougall began reading when she was four years old as reading was important for the family.

McDougall graduated in Kamehameha Schools in 1994 and later attended Whittier College where she earned a BA in English. She received an MFA in creative writing from the University of Oregon, where she also spent time teaching poetry and Ethnic Studies. In 2002, she was awarded a Fulbright grant and went to Aotearoa to interview Indigenous Pacific Creative writers and studied Indigenous Pacific literature. McDougall attained a PhD in English with a specialization in Contemporary Kānaka Maoli literature in 2011 at the University of Hawaiʻi at Mānoa. She later received the Mellon-Hawaiʻi Postdoctoral Fellowship and Ford Foundation Postdoctoral Fellowship awards in 2013, which supported her work to revise her dissertation into her first book Finding Meaning: Kaona and Contemporary Hawaiian Literature.

== Profession ==
McDougall is an associate professor in the American Studies Department of the University of Hawaiʻi at Mānoa specializing in Indigenous Studies. Her fields of study include: Indigenous literatures and critical theory, American imperialism in the Pacific, Indigenous rights, and sovereignty movements. Her ongoing research focuses on the rhetorics and aesthetics of Indigenous women's activist fashion within land and water protection movements. In 2024, she presented at the Hawai'i Contemporary Art Summit.

== Work ==
=== Literary criticism ===
McDougall is the author of the first extensive study of contemporary Hawaiian literature, Finding Meaning: Kaona and Contemporary Hawaiian Literature. Published in 2016, Finding Meaning analyses kaona, which are hidden meanings in Hawaiian poetry, and features selections of fiction, poetry, and drama by Hawaiian authors such as Haunani-Kay Trask, John Dominis Holt, and Imaikalani Kalahele. Finding Meaning won the Native American Literature Symposiumʻs Beatrice Medicine Award for Published Monograph in 2017.

She co-edited Huihui: Navigating Art and Literature in the Pacific with Georganne Nordstrom and Jeffrey Carroll. Published in 2014, Huihui was the first anthology to navigate the interconnections between the rhetorics and aesthetics of the Pacific. It consists of critical essays, poetry, short fiction, speeches, photography, and personal reflections that cover a number of topics to not only intersect indigenous intellectual, political, and cultural traditions and innovations of the Pacific, but also to decolonize Oceania.

McDougall is also a contributor to numerous publications including The Value of Hawaiʻi 2: Ancestral Roots, Oceanic Visions (2014), and Kanaka ʻŌiwi Methodologies: Moʻolelo and Metaphor (2015).

=== Poetry ===
McDougall wrote The Salt-Wind / Ka Makani Paʻakai, a poetry collection published in 2008 that tells of her positionality as a Kanaka wahine, a Hawaiian woman, in a colonized nation through childhood stories, belonging, and connection. Her second collection of poetry, 'Āina Hanau: Birth Land was published in 2023.

She has contributed her poetry to a number of publications and productions including Effigies: An Anthology of New Indigenous Writing (2009), a poetry album titled Undercurrent, and UPU a theatre production featuring poetry from Pacific authors that premiered at the Auckland Arts Festival in 2020.

=== Community service ===
McDougall once served as the project coordinator of events for the Council for Native Hawaiian Advancement, a non-profit organization based in the island of Oʻahu that works to improve the livelihoods of Kānaka Maoli. In 2011, McDougall co-founded the Ala Press, an independent publisher that displays the work of Indigenous Pacific Islanders, with Craig Santos Perez. She currently serves as one of the associate editors of American Quarterly, the official publication of the American Studies Association. She is also on the board of directors for The Pacific Writers’ Connection, a non-profit organization that features the works of Indigenous leaders in the Pacific in hopes of spreading awareness to the concerns of Indigenous Peoples for their land and wellbeing.

== Awards and distinction ==
- 2002: James Vaughan Award for Poetry
- 2011: Fulbright Award
- 2012: Richard Braddock Award
- 2013: Ford Foundation Postdoctoral Fellowship
- 2013: Mellon-Hawaiʻi Postdoctoral Fellowship
- 2017: Native American Literature Symposium's Beatrice Medicine Award for Published Monograph
- 2017: College of Arts and Humanities Excellence in Teaching Award
- 2024: Elliot Cades Award
- 2023–2025: Hawai'i State Poet Laureate
