= Emily Kau'i Zuttermeister =

American Hawaiian hula master, teacher (1909–1994)

- Born: Emily Kau'i-o-makaweli-o-kaua'i-o-na-Lani-o-ka-Mano-o-kalanipo Kukahiwa; March 8, 1909; Territory of Hawaii (now U.S.)
- Died: March 3, 1994 (aged 84); Kāne'ohe, Hawaii, U.S.
- Other names: Emily Kau'i Kukahiwa, Emily Kau'i, Emily Kau'i McCabe
- Education: St Ann's School, Benjamin Parker School, Waimea High School
- Occupations: Hula dance master, hula teacher
- Spouses: Patrick J. McCabe (divorced), Carl Henry Zuttermeister
- Awards: Living Treasures of Hawaii (1983)

Emily Kau'i Zuttermeister (née Emily Kau'i-o-makaweli-o-kaua'i-o-na-Lani-o-ka-Mano-o-kalanipo Kukahiwa; March 8, 1909 – March 3, 1994) was an American Hawaiian hula master and teacher (kumu hula). She was recognized as one of the Living Treasures of Hawaii by the Honpa Hongwanji Mission, and was a recipient of a National Heritage Fellowship in 1984.

== Personal life ==
On March 8, 1909, Emily Kauiomakawelinalaniokamanookalanipo (also referred to as Emily Kau'i) was born to Hawaiian parents Elizabeth Kaili (née Kahula) and Gabriel Kukahiwa. She was taken as a hānai (or adoptee) by William Kamahumahu Kalani and Virginia A'ahulole Kalani. She remained in contact with her birth family. She excelled in quilting and won blue ribbons in State Fairs and other craft competitions.

She attended St Ann's School and Benjamin Parker School on O'ahu and Waimea High School on Kaua'i.

She married Patrick J. McCabe and they had two children, Justina (born 1928) and Patrick Jr. (born 1929). However, they divorced shortly thereafter. On October 13, 1934, she married an American U.S. Navy Officer, Carl Henry Zuttermeister. Her son, Patrick, took the name Carl Henry Zuttermeister Jr. Afterward, she went by the name Emily Kau'i Zuttermeister. During the late 1930s, the Zuttermeisters bought land and built several houses which were later rented out and passed down to her children.

== Career ==
In her 20s, she worked as a telephone operator at the State Hospital in Kāne'ohe and later became an assistant to the chef at the hospital. In 1933, with the encouragement from her husband, she started taking hula lessons from her mother's cousin, Samuel Pua Ha'aheo. Zuttermeister formally graduated from Ha'aheo's class in 1935.

In 1936, Zuttermeister opened her own school for hula – Ilima Hula Hale. She continued teaching hula, traditional chants, and pahu drumming in the style of Pua Ha'aheo for more than 50 years. She taught her daughters, Noenoelani and Kuuipo, and her granddaughter, Hauoli as well.

Zuttermeister judged various hula competitions, including the Merrie Monarch Festival in Hilo, the King Kamehameha Traditional Hula and Chant Competition, and the Queen Lili'uokalani Trust's Hula Kahiko Amateur Contest. In 1983, she was recognized as a Living Treasure of Hawaii by the Honpa Hongwanji Mission.

She was a recipient of a 1984 National Heritage Fellowship awarded by the National Endowment for the Arts, which is the United States government's highest honor in the folk and traditional arts.

In 1989, four Zuttermeister generations performers represented Hawai'i in the Festival of American Folklife at the Smithsonian.

== Death and legacy ==
Zuttermeister died on March 3, 1994 at her Kāne'ohe home. She was five days shy of her 85th birthday. Her daughter, Noenoelani, took over her studio and continues to teach hula.
