= Gymnosporia arbutifolia =

Conservation status
- Least Concern (IUCN 3.1)

Scientific classification
- Kingdom: Plantae
- Clade: Tracheophytes
- Clade: Angiosperms
- Clade: Eudicots
- Clade: Rosids
- Order: Celastrales
- Family: Celastraceae
- Genus: Gymnosporia
- Species: G. arbutifolia

Binomial name
- Gymnosporia arbutifolia (Hochst. ex A.Rich.) Loes. (1893)

Synonyms
- Celastrus arbutifolius Hochst. ex A.Rich. (1848); Maytenus arbutifolia (Hochst. ex A.Rich.) R.Wilczek (1960)

Species of plant

Gymnosporia arbutifolia is a species of flowering plant in the family Celastraceae. It is a thorny shrub or tree native to eastern Africa and the Arabian Peninsula. It grows in the mountains of eastern Africa, from the Ethiopian Highlands to the Albertine Rift, and to the southeastern Arabian Peninsula, from 1350 to 2080 meters elevation.

Two subspecies are accepted:

- Gymnosporia arbutifolia subsp. arbutifolia – Burundi, Democratic Republic of the Congo, Djibouti, Eritrea, Ethiopia, Kenya, Rwanda, Saudi Arabia, Somalia, Tanzania, Uganda, and Yemen.
- Gymnosporia arbutifolia subsp. sidamoensis (Sebsebe) Jordaan – southern Ethiopia
