= Wh-agreement =

Morphological changes triggered by wh-movement

Wh-agreement refers to morphological changes triggered by wh-movement, usually in verbs or complementisers. It occurs in a number of Bantu languages, Austronesian languages including Chamorro and Palauan, Algonquin languages such as Ojibwe, as well as Hausa, French, Scottish Gaelic, and Irish.

For example, in Chamorro, the infix ⟨um⟩ (labelled ⟨WH[nom]⟩) is attached to the verb to mark agreement with the nominative question phrase following subject extraction:

Ha fa'gåsi si Juan i kareta.
3sSA wash PND Juan the car
'Juan washed the car.'

Håyi f⟨um⟩a'gåsi i kareta?
who? ⟨WH[NOM]⟩wash the car
'Who washed the car?'

Additionally, some languages have distinct agreement morphology depending on the case of element being moved. In the case of object extraction in Chamorro, the verb fa'gasi instead becomes fina’gasése (marked with ⟨WH[obj]⟩):

Håfa i f⟨in⟩a’gasésen-ña {si Juan} para hågu?
what the ⟨WH[OBJ]⟩wash.PROG-AGR Juan for you
‘What is Juan washing for you?’

In French and Scottish Gaelic, special complementisers are used in cases of wh-movement:

Tu as dit que le livre était tombé
you have said that the book had fallen
‘You said that the book had fallen.’

Qu'est-ce que tu as dit qui était tombé
what-is-this that you have said that.AGR was fallen
‘What did you say had fallen?’
