= Gymnosporia stylosa =

Conservation status
- Vulnerable (IUCN 2.3)

Scientific classification
- Kingdom: Plantae
- Clade: Tracheophytes
- Clade: Angiosperms
- Clade: Eudicots
- Clade: Rosids
- Order: Celastrales
- Family: Celastraceae
- Genus: Gymnosporia
- Species: G. stylosa

Binomial name
- Gymnosporia stylosa Pierre (1894)

Synonyms
- Celastrus buxifolius var. montanus Kuntze (1891); Gymnosporia curtisii King (1896); Maytenus curtisii (King) Ding Hou (1963); Maytenus stylosa (Pierre) Lobr.-Callen (1975)

Species of flowering plant

Gymnosporia stylosa is a species of flowering plant in the family Celastraceae. It is a scrambling shrub or tree native to Indo-China (Cambodia, Thailand, and Vietnam) and Peninsular Malaysia. It is threatened by habitat loss.
