= Gymnosporia addat =

Conservation status
- Vulnerable (IUCN 3.1)

Scientific classification
- Kingdom: Plantae
- Clade: Tracheophytes
- Clade: Angiosperms
- Clade: Eudicots
- Clade: Rosids
- Order: Celastrales
- Family: Celastraceae
- Genus: Gymnosporia
- Species: G. addat

Binomial name
- Gymnosporia addat Loes.

Synonyms
- Maytenus addat (Loes.) Sebsebe (1985)

Species of tree

Gymnosporia addat is a species of flowering plant in the family Celastraceae. It is endemic to the Afromontane forests, especially along forest margins, of Ethiopia.
