= Kealoha =

Kealoha is a name and surname of Hawaiian origin. It comes from the Hawaiian word ke, meaning "the," and aloha, meaning "love." Its cognate in the Māori language is Te Aroha, which is also used as a given name.

== As a given name ==
- Kealoha (ne Steven Wong), performance poet and Hawaii's first poet laureate
- Kealoha Pilares (born 1988), American football player
- Jimmy Snuka (1943–2017), Fijian American wrestler also known by his ring name, Jimmy Kealoha
- Edmund Kealoha Parker, Sr. (1931–1990), American martial artist
- Edmund Kealoha Parker Jr., American martial artist
- Shawn Kealoha Boskie
- Dane Kealoha A. A. Sardinha, American baseball player

== As a surname ==
- J. R. Kealoha (died 1877), Native Hawaiian veteran of the American Civil War
- James Kealoha (1908–1983), Hawaii politician and first Lieutenant Governor of Hawaii
- Katherine Kealoha, former Hawaii deputy prosecutor and convicted felon
- Maia Kealoha (born 2016), American actress
- Pua Kealoha (1902–1989), American competition swimmer and Olympic champion
- Warren Kealoha (1903–1972), American competition swimmer and Olympic champion

== Places ==
- James Kealoha Beach
