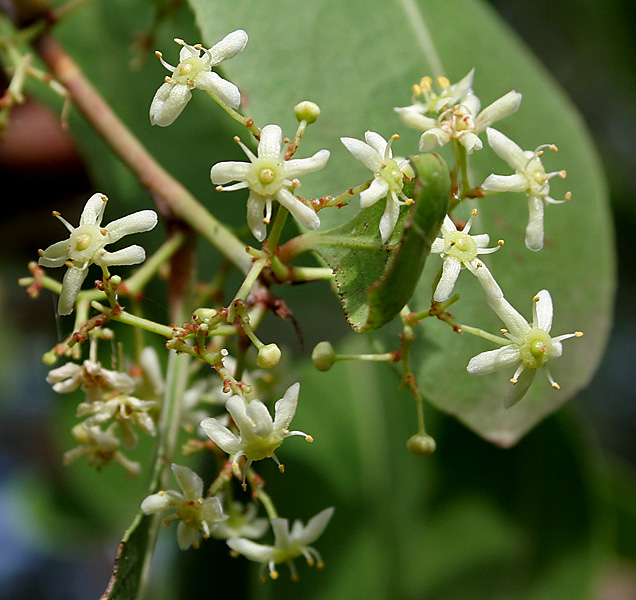
- Gymnosporia montana in Andhra Pradesh, India

Scientific classification
- Kingdom: Plantae
- Clade: Tracheophytes
- Clade: Angiosperms
- Clade: Eudicots
- Clade: Rosids
- Order: Celastrales
- Family: Celastraceae
- Genus: Gymnosporia (Wight & Arn.) Hook.f.

Synonyms
- Encentrus C.Presl; Gloveria Jordaan; Polyacanthus C.Presl; Schinzia Dennst.; Semarilla Raf.

= Gymnosporia =

Genus of flowering plants

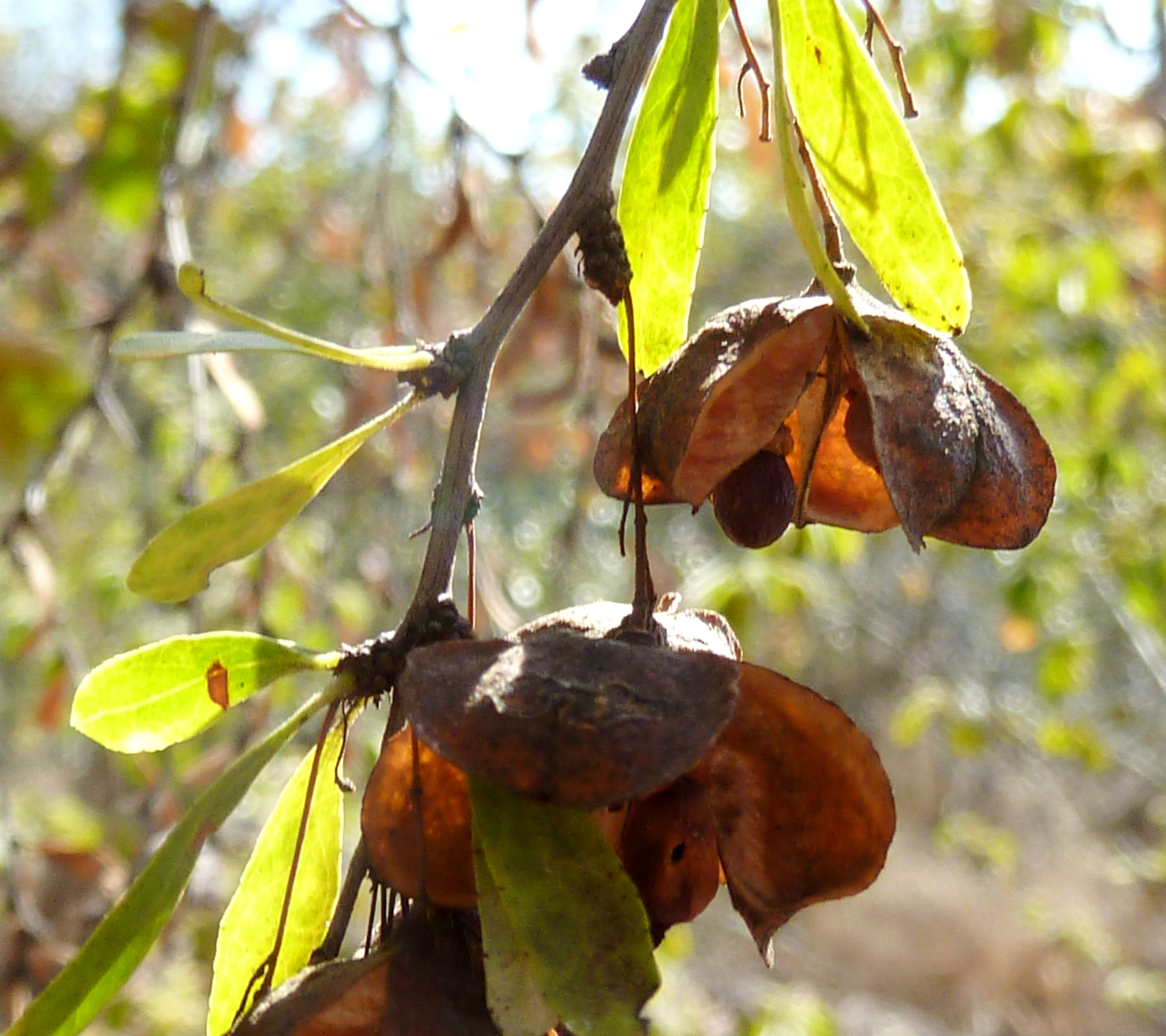
Old fruit and seed of G. tenuispina

Gymnosporia is an Old World genus of plants, that comprise suffrutices, shrubs and trees. It was formerly considered congeneric with Maytenus, but more recent investigations separated it based on the presence of achyblasts (truncated branchlets) and spines, alternate leaves or fascicles of leaves, an inflorescence that forms a dichasium, mostly unisexual flowers, and fruit forming a dehiscent capsule, with an aril on the seed. It is dioecious, with male and female flowers on separate plants.

== Range ==
The genus occurs in all of Africa, Madagascar and adjacent islands, southern Spain, the Middle East, Afghanistan, Pakistan, India, Sri Lanka, Thailand, Vietnam, southern China, Taiwan, the Ryukyu Islands, Malesia, Micronesia, and in Queensland, Australia. In the Afrotropical realm the two main centers of diversity are in the south and the northeast.

== Species ==
The genus includes some 117 species:

- Gymnosporia acuminata Hook.f. ex M.A.Lawson
- Gymnosporia addat Loes. – Ethiopia
- Gymnosporia alaternifolia (Tul.) Loes.
- Gymnosporia andongensis (Oliv.) Loes.
- Gymnosporia annobonensis Loes. & Mildbr.
- Gymnosporia arbutifolia (Hochst. ex A.Rich.) Loes.
- Gymnosporia arenicola Jordaan
- Gymnosporia austroyunnanensis (S.J.Pei & Y.H.Li) M.P.Simmons
- Gymnosporia bachmannii Loes.
- Gymnosporia bailadillana V.Naray. & Mooney
- Gymnosporia baumii Loes.
- Gymnosporia benguelensis Loes.
- Gymnosporia beniensis Robyns & Lawalrée
- Gymnosporia berberoides W.W.Sm.
- Gymnosporia bonii Pit.
- Gymnosporia brevipetala Loes.
- Gymnosporia buchananii Loes.
- Gymnosporia buxifolia (L.) Szyszyl.
- Gymnosporia buxifolioides Loes.
- Gymnosporia capitata (E.Mey. ex Sond.) Loes.
- Gymnosporia cassinoides (L'Hér.) Masf. – Canary Islands
- Gymnosporia chevalieri Tardieu
- Gymnosporia commiphoroides H.Perrier
- Gymnosporia confertiflora (J.Y.Luo & X.X.Chen) M.P.Simmons
- Gymnosporia cortii Pic.Serm.
- Gymnosporia crataegina Baker
- Gymnosporia crenata (G.Forst.) Seem.
- Gymnosporia cryptopetala Reyes-Bet. & A.Santos
- Gymnosporia devenishii Jordaan
- Gymnosporia dhofarensis (Sebsebe) Jordaan – Oman and Yemen
- Gymnosporia divaricata Baker
- Gymnosporia diversifolia Maxim.
- Gymnosporia dongfangensis (F.W.Xing & X.S.Qin) M.P.Simmons
- Gymnosporia drummondii (N.Robson & Sebsebe) Jordaan
- Gymnosporia elliptica (Thunb.) Schönland
- Gymnosporia emarginata (Willd.) Thwaites
- Gymnosporia engleriana Loes.
- Gymnosporia esquirolii (H.Lév.) H.Lév.
- Gymnosporia falconeri M.A.Lawson
- Gymnosporia forsskaoliana (Sebsebe) Jordaan
- Gymnosporia fruticosa (Thwaites) Thwaites
- Gymnosporia gariepensis Jordaan
- Gymnosporia glaucophylla Jordaan
- Gymnosporia gracilipes (Welw. ex Oliv.) Loes.
- Gymnosporia gracilis Loes.
- Gymnosporia grandifolia (Davison) Jordaan
- Gymnosporia grossulariae (Tul.) Loes.
- Gymnosporia guangxiensis (C.Y.Cheng & W.L.Sha) M.P.Simmons
- Gymnosporia gurueensis (N.Robson) Jordaan
- Gymnosporia hainanensis Merr. & Chun
- Gymnosporia harenensis (Sebsebe) Jordaan – Ethiopia
- Gymnosporia harlandii Hance
- Gymnosporia harveyana Loes.
- Gymnosporia hemipterocarpa Jordaan
- Gymnosporia heterophylla (Eckl. & Zeyh.) Loes.
- Gymnosporia heyneana (Roth) M.A.Lawson
- Gymnosporia inermis Merr. & L.M.Perry
- Gymnosporia integrifolia (L.f.) Glover
- Gymnosporia intermedia Chiov.
- Gymnosporia jinyangensis (C.Y.Chang) Q.R.Liu & Funston
- Gymnosporia keniensis (Loes.) Jordaan
- Gymnosporia leptopus (Tul.) Baker
- Gymnosporia linearis (L.f.) Loes.
- Gymnosporia listeri (Prain) A.T.Bhat, K.M.P.Kumar & Rana
- Gymnosporia littoralis (Backer) Jordaan
- Gymnosporia livingstonei Jordaan
- Gymnosporia macrocarpa Jordaan
- Gymnosporia maranguensis (Loes.) Loes.
- Gymnosporia marcanii Craib
- Gymnosporia markwardii Jordaan
- Gymnosporia masindei (Gereau) Jordaan
- Gymnosporia matoboensis Jordaan
- Gymnosporia montana (Roth) Benth.
- Gymnosporia mossambicensis (Klotzsch) Loes.
- Gymnosporia nemorosa (Eckl. & Zeyh.) Szyszyl.
- Gymnosporia nguruensis (N.Robson & Sebsebe) Jordaan
- Gymnosporia nitida Merr.
- Gymnosporia obbiadensis Chiov.
- Gymnosporia obscura (A.Rich.) Loes.
- Gymnosporia orbiculata (C.Y.Wu ex S.J.Pei & Y.H.Li) Q.R.Liu &
- Gymnosporia ovalifolia (Steud.) A.T.Bhat, K.M.P.Kumar & Rana
- Gymnosporia oxycarpa (N.Robson) Jordaan
- Gymnosporia pallida Collett & Hemsl.
- Gymnosporia parviflora (Vahl) Chiov.
- Gymnosporia pertinax (N.Hallé & J.Florence) M.P.Simmons – Rapa Iti
- Gymnosporia polyacanthus Szyszyl.
- Gymnosporia puberula M.A.Lawson
- Gymnosporia pubescens (N.Robson) Jordaan
- Gymnosporia punctata (Sebsebe) Jordaan
- Gymnosporia putterlickioides Loes.
- Gymnosporia pyria (Willemet) Jordaan
- Gymnosporia richardsiae (N.Robson & Sebsebe) Jordaan
- Gymnosporia rothiana (Walp.) M.A.Lawson
- Gymnosporia royleana Wall. ex M.A.Lawson
- Gymnosporia rubra (Harv.) Loes.
- Gymnosporia rufa (Wall.) Hook.f.
- Gymnosporia salicifolia M.A.Lawson
- Gymnosporia schliebenii Jordaan
- Gymnosporia sekhukhuniensis Jordaan & A.E.van Wyk
- Gymnosporia senegalensis (Lam.) Loes.
- Gymnosporia serrata (Hochst. ex A.Rich.) Loes.
- Gymnosporia sikkimensis Prain
- Gymnosporia somalensis Loes.
- Gymnosporia spinosa (Blanco) Merr. & Rolfe
- Gymnosporia stylosa Pierre – Indochina and Peninsular Malaysia
- Gymnosporia swazica Jordaan
- Gymnosporia tenuispina (Sond.) Szyszyl.
- Gymnosporia thompsonii Merr. – Mariana & Caroline Islands
- Gymnosporia thomsonii Kurz
- Gymnosporia thyrsiflora (S.J.Pei & Y.H.Li) W.B.Yu & D.Z.Li
- Gymnosporia tiaoloshanensis Chun & F.C.How
- Gymnosporia trilocularis Hayata
- Gymnosporia uniflora Davison
- Gymnosporia vanwykii (R.H.Archer) Jordaan
- Gymnosporia variabilis (Hemsl.) Loes.
- Gymnosporia wallichiana (Spreng.) M.A.Lawson
- Gymnosporia woodii Szyszyl.

=== Formerly placed here ===
- Maytenus umbellata (R.Br.) Mabb. (as Gymnosporia dryandri Masf.)
