= Michael Lujan Bevacqua =

Chamorro scholar, activist, and author

Michael Lujan Bevacqua (born Miget Lujan Bevacqua) is a Chamorro scholar, activist, author, producer and editor. He currently lives in Mangilao, Guam and works at the Guam Museum as a curator. Bevacqua founded the first ever Chamorro Studies Program at the University of Guam in 2011, where he worked as a professor teaching the history of Guam and the Chamorro language for 10 years.

== Early life and education ==
Bevacqua was born to Rita Flores Lujan Butler and Robert Francis Bevacqua, and is the grandson of Elizabeth De Leon Flores Lujan, of the Kabesa clan, and blacksmith Joaquin Flores Lujan, of the Bittot clan. He has a brother named Jack. While his grandparents spoke CHamoru, his mother did not, so Bevacqua took up CHamoru language classes during his attendance at the University of Guam.

Bevacqua graduated from the University of Guam with a Bachelor of Arts in Art and Literature in 2001, and a Master of Arts in Micronesian Studies in 2004. He then attended the University of California, San Diego, graduating with a Master of Arts in Ethnic Studies in 2007, and completing his PhD in 2010. His research focuses on the impact of colonization on the Chamorro people and the importance of the nation gaining independence.

== Career and activism ==
Bevacqua taught Guam history and the Chamoru language at the University of Guam for 10 years.

Bevacqua is a co-chair for the local organisation Independent Guåhan, which aims to educate Guamanians on de-colonisation and independence. He is a board member of the San Diego Chamorro Cultural Center, through which he stood before the Fourth Committee of the United Nations to attest on Guam's political and colonial status in 2007. From 2003 to 2004, Bevacqua was a consultant for the Chamorro non-profit organisation Guam Communications Network.

Bevacqua has helped to organize several academic and activist events, including the 2003 Human Rights Watch Film Festival in Guam and California, and the conferences "Famoksaiyan: Decolonizing Chamorro Histories, Identities and Futures" (2006), "Famoksaiyan: Our Time to Paddle Forward" (2007), and "Ghosts, Monsters and the Dead" (2007).

Bevacqua is a member of multiple academic and activist groups, including The Association of Asian American Studies, The Chamorro Information Activists, Nasion Chamoru, The National Association of Ethnic Studies, The National Pacific Islander Education Network, and Famoksaiyan.

== Selected publications ==
=== Academic ===
- Bevacqua, M. L., & Cruz, M. L. "The Banality of American Empire: The Curious Case of Guam, USA". Journal of Transnational American Studies. 2020.
- Bevacqua, M. L. "Guam". The Contemporary Pacific. 2017.
- Bevacqua, M. L. These May or May Not Be Americans: The Patriotic Myth and the Hijacking of Chamorro History in Guam. University of Guam. 2005.

== Awards and nominations ==
- 2004 and 2006 - winner of the Tan Chong Padula Humanitarian Award given by the Southern California non-profit organization Guam Communications Network for services to the Chamorro community.
- 2015 - Nomination for Best Made in the Marianas Award at the Guam International Film Festival (Påkto: I Hinekka).
