= Waimea High School =

Public high school in Hawaii, United States

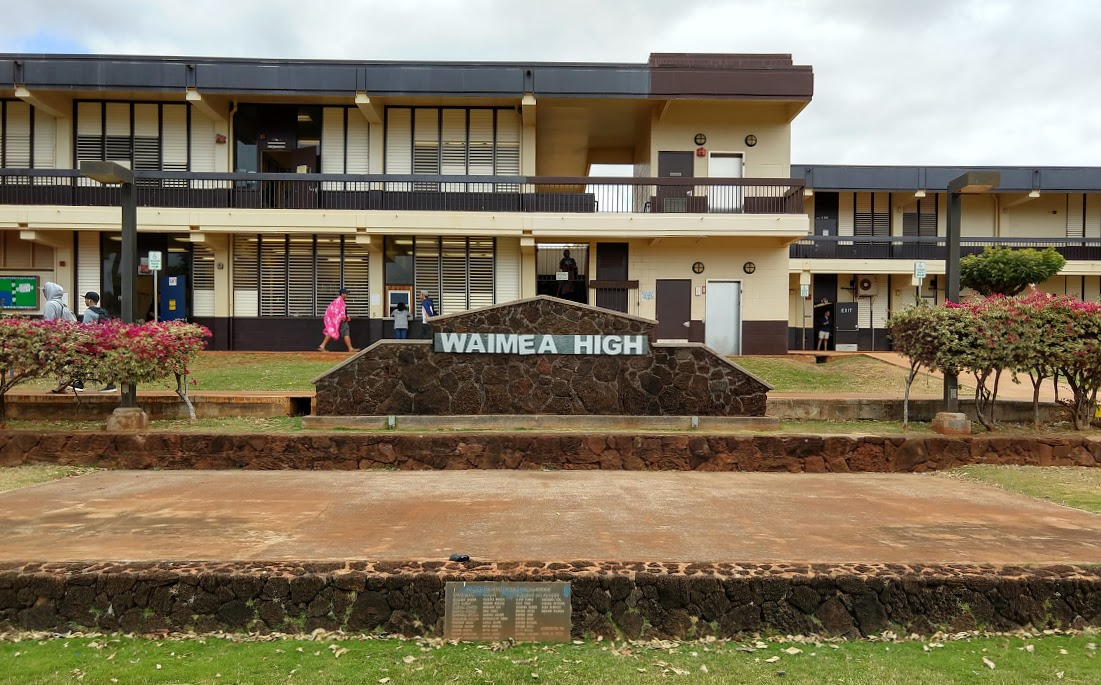
- Waimea High School

Location
- 9707 Tsuchiya Road; Waimea, Hawaii 96796; United States
- 21°57′28″N 159°40′7″W

Information
- Type: Public
- Motto: Imagine Greatness
- Established: 1881
- School district: HIDOE Kapaa-Kauai-Waimea
- Principal: Mahina Anguay
- Teaching staff: 49.00 (FTE)
- Grades: 9-12
- Enrollment: 767 (2022–2023)
- Student to teacher ratio: 15.65
- Colors: Blue and White
- Athletics conference: Kauai Interscholastic Federation
- Mascot: Menehune

Waimea High School is a public high school in Waimea on the island of Kauaʻi in the state of Hawaii. It was established in 1881 and serves grades 9 through 12. It is the westernmost high school in the United States of America. The school mascot is the Menehune, and the school colors are blue and white.

== Campus ==
The campus displays the mixed media sculpture Hoʻolilo by Ralph Kouchi and the stainless steel sculpture Waimea Ohana by Rowland Morita.

Waimea High School is the oldest high school on the island of Kauai.

== Notable alumni ==
Listed alphabetically by last name:

- Jordon Dizon, former NFL linebacker and scout for the Denver Broncos
- Thomas Iannucci, Nā Hōkū Hanohano-winning rapper
- Ron Kouchi, Hawaii state senator and senate president
- Eduardo Malapit, Mayor of Kauai
- Sakae Takahashi, politician
- Emily Kau'i Zuttermeister, hula master
