= Sakae Takahashi (politician) =

Japanese-American politician (1919–2001)

Sakae Takahashi (Japanese: 高橋 栄; December 8, 1919 – April 16, 2001) was an American politician from Hawaii.

== Early life and education ==
Takahashi was born on December 8, 1919, in Makaweli. He grew up on a sugar plantation and attended Waimea High School. After high school he studied at the University of Hawaiʻi on a scholarship and joined the Reserve Officers' Training Corps.

== Career ==
After graduating from college, Takahashi joined the Army Reserve and became a second lieutenant in 1941. During World War II he served as a member of the 100th Infantry Battalion. He was the only survivor of 190 men during the battle of Monte Cassino. By the time he was discharged in 1946 he had risen to the rank of major.

After leaving the army Takahashi studied law at Rutgers University. When he returned to Hawaii after graduation he worked as an attorney. He was elected to the Board of Supervisors in 1950. Takahashi was elected to the Territorial Senate in 1954, and remained there when the territory became a state. He convinced Daniel Inouye to enter politics that year, beginning the Hawaii Democratic Revolution of 1954. He served in the senate until 1974, and as a delegate to the 1968 Constitutional Convention. He also worked with fellow other Japanese Americans to form Central Pacific Bank, which he served as the chairman of for 17 years. He also served on the boards of several other organizations.

Takahashi died on April 16, 2001.
