= Lee Tonouchi =

American poet

Lee A. Tonouchi (born circa 1972) is a Hawaii-born writer and editor, who calls himself "Da Pidgin Guerilla" because of his strong advocacy of the Hawaiian Pidgin language.

In February 2026, Tonouchi was named the 3rd Poet Laureate of Hawaii for a 3-year term running 2026–2029.

== Biography ==
At the age of 2, Tonouchi survived a bus/car collision which claimed the life of his mother. Tonouchi graduated from Aiea High School in 1990.

He promotes the idea that Hawaiian Pidgin is an appropriate language for both creative and academic writing. He was inspired by the works of Eric Chock in the journal Bamboo Ridge. All of his writing, including his Master's Thesis, is in Pidgin. He was an instructor of English at Kapiʻolani Community College in 2007. He also taught at Hawaii Pacific University during 2005, and later. His works often address family relationship in a humorous way.

Tonouchi's plays have been awarded among multiple categories of the annual Kumu Kahua playwrighting contest, the Hawaiʻi Prize, the Pacific Rim Prize, and the Resident Prize, as well as numerous wins in the monthly short play contest in partnership with Bamboo Ridge.

== Works ==
His principal works:

- Hybolics (1999), literary magazine in Hawaiian Pidgin (co-editor)
- Da Word (2001), a collection of short stories
- Living Pidgin: Contemplations on Pidgin Culture (2002), a collection of poems and essays
- Gone Feeshing (2004), a play first produced at Kumu Kahua Theatre
- Da Kine Dictionary: Da Hawai'i Community Pidgin Dictionary Projeck (2005), a dictionary of Hawaiian Pidgin
