= Chamorro language =

Austronesian language of Guam and the Mariana Islands

Chamorro
- Finuʼ Chamorro; Finoʼ CHamoru
- Pronunciation: [ˈfinoʔ t͡sɑˈmoɾu]
- Native to: Guam; Northern Mariana Islands
- Region: Mariana Islands
- Ethnicity: Chamorro
- Native speakers: 58,000 (2005–2015)
- Language family: Austronesian: Malayo-Polynesian; Chamorro
- Early forms: Proto-Austronesian: Proto-Malayo-Polynesian; Proto-Chamorro; Old Chamorro
- Standard forms: Standard Chamorro
- Dialects: Guamanian; Rotanese; Northern Mariana Islands
- Writing system: Latin

Official status
- Official language in: Guam; Northern Mariana Islands

Language codes
- ISO 639-1: ch
- ISO 639-2: cha
- ISO 639-3: cha
- Glottolog: cham1312
- ELP: Chamorro
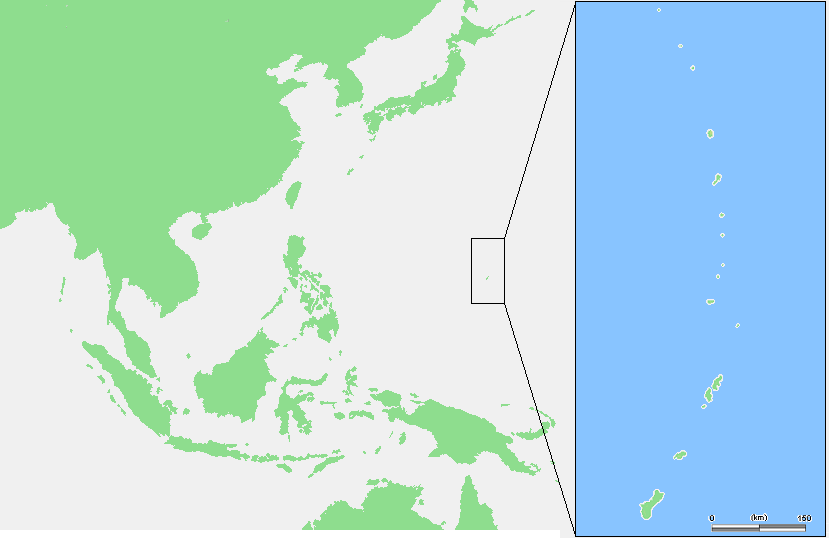

- Chamorro is classified as Vulnerable by the UNESCO Atlas of the World's Languages in Danger.

Chamorro (Note: Pronounced /tʃəˈmɔːroʊ/, chə-MOR-oh; endonym: Finoʼ CHamoru in Guam or Finuʼ Chamorro in the Northern Mariana Islands, pronounced [ˈfinoʔ t͡sɑˈmoɾu].) is an Austronesian language spoken by about 58,000 people, numbering about 25,800 on Guam and about 32,200 in the Northern Mariana Islands and elsewhere.

It is the historic native language of the Chamorro people, who are indigenous to the Mariana Islands, although it is less commonly spoken today than in the past. Chamorro has three distinct dialects: Guamanian, Rotanese, and that in the other Northern Mariana Islands (NMI).

== Classification ==
Unlike most of its neighbors, Chamorro is not classified as a Micronesian or Polynesian language. Rather, like Palauan, it possibly constitutes an independent branch of the Malayo-Polynesian language family.

At the time the Spanish rule over Guam ended, it was thought that Chamorro was a semi-creole language, with a substantial amount of the vocabulary of Spanish origin and beginning to have a high level of mutual intelligibility with Spanish. It is reported that even in the early 1920s, Spanish was reported to be a living language in Guam for commercial transactions, but the use of Spanish and Chamorro was rapidly declining as a result of English pressure.

Spanish influences in Chamorro exist due to three centuries of Spanish colonial rule. Many words in the Chamorro lexicon are of Latin etymological origin via Spanish, but the pronunciation of these loanwords has been nativized to the phonology of Chamorro, and their use conforms to indigenous grammatical structures. Some authors consider Chamorro a mixed language under a historical point of view, even though it remains independent and unique. In his Chamorro Reference Grammar, Donald M. Topping states:

The most notable influence on Chamorro language and culture came from the Spanish… There was wholesale borrowing of Spanish words and phrases into Chamorro, and there was even some borrowing from the Spanish sound system. But this borrowing was linguistically superficial. The bones of the Chamorro language remained intact… In virtually all cases of borrowing, Spanish words were forced to conform to the Chamorro sound system… While Spanish may have left a lasting mark on Chamorro vocabulary, as it did on many Philippine and South American languages, it had virtually no effect on Chamorro grammar… The Japanese influence on Chamorro was much greater than that of German but much less than Spanish. Once again, the linguistic influence was restricted exclusively to vocabulary items, many of which refer to manufactured objects…

In contrast, in the essays found in Del español al chamorro. Lenguas en contacto en el Pacífico (2009), Rafael Rodríguez-Ponga refers to modern Chamorro as a "mixed language" of "Hispanic-Austronesian" origins and estimates that approximately 50% of the Chamorro lexicon comes from Spanish, whose contribution goes far beyond loanwords.

Rodríguez-Ponga (1995) considers Chamorro to be either Spanish-Austronesian or a Spanish-Austronesian mixed language, or at least a language that has emerged from a process of contact and creolization on the island of Guam since modern Chamorro is influenced in vocabulary and has in its grammar many elements of Spanish origin: verbs, articles, prepositions, numerals, conjunctions, etc.

The process, which began in the 17th century and ended in the early 20th century, meant a profound change from the old Chamorro (paleo-Chamorro) to modern Chamorro (neo-Chamorro) in its grammar, phonology, and vocabulary.

== Speakers ==
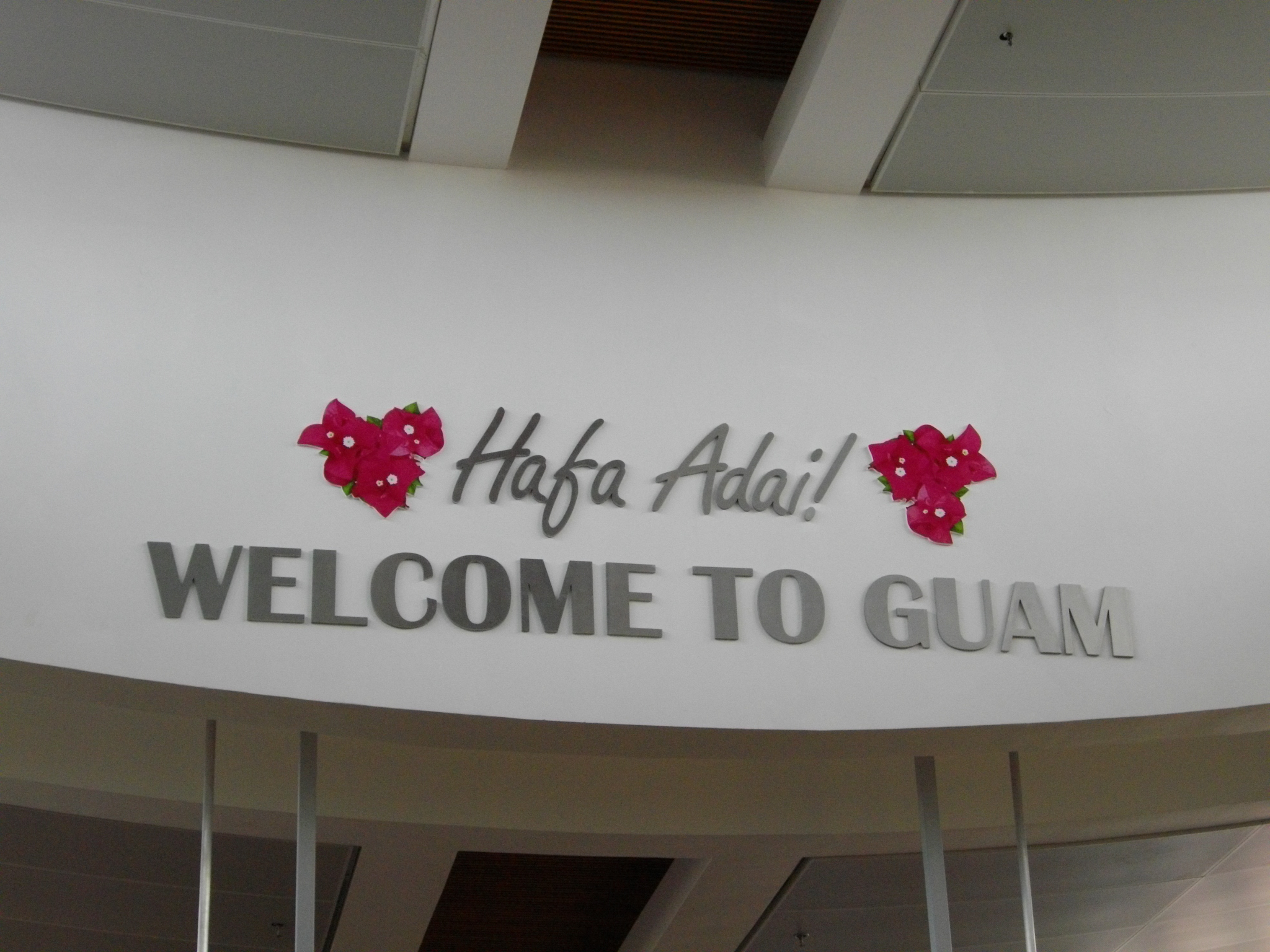
The common greeting "Hafa Adai" at Antonio B. Won Pat International Airport on Guam. "Hafa" here is not written as "Håfa" as in the newer, standardised orthography.

The Chamorro language is threatened, with a precipitous drop in language fluency over the past century. It is estimated that 75% of the population of Guam was literate in the Chamorro language around the time the United States captured the island during the Spanish–American War (there are no similar language fluency estimates for other areas of the Mariana Islands during this time). A century later, the 2000 U.S. Census showed that fewer than 20% of Chamorros living in Guam speak their heritage language fluently, and the vast majority of those were over the age of 55.

A number of forces have contributed to the steep, post-World War II decline of Chamorro language fluency. There is a long history of colonization of the Marianas, beginning with the Spanish colonization in 1668 and, eventually, the American acquisition of Guam in 1898 (whose hegemony continues to this day). This imposed power structures privileging the language of the region's colonizers. According to estimates, a large majority, as stated above (75%), maintained active knowledge of the Chamorro language even during the Spanish colonial era, but this was all to change with the advent of American imperialism and enforcement of the English language.

In Guam, the language suffered additional suppression when the U.S. government banned the Chamorro language in schools and workplaces in 1922, destroying all Chamorro dictionaries. Similar policies were undertaken by the Japanese government when they controlled the region during World War II. After the war, when Guam was recaptured by the United States, American administrators of the island continued to impose "no Chamorro" restrictions in local schools, teaching only English and disciplining students for speaking their indigenous tongue.

While these oppressive language policies were progressively lifted, Chamorro usage had substantially decreased. Subsequent generations were often raised in households where only the oldest family members were fluent. Lack of exposure made it increasingly difficult to pick up Chamorro as a second language. Within a few generations, English replaced Chamorro as the language of daily life.

There is a difference in the rate of Chamorro language fluency between Guam and the rest of the Marianas. On Guam the number of native Chamorro speakers has dwindled since the mid-1990s. In the Northern Mariana Islands (NMI), younger Chamorros speak the language fluently but prefer English when speaking to their children. Chamorro is common in Chamorro households in the Northern Marianas, but fluency has greatly decreased among Guamanian Chamorros during the years of American rule in favor of the American English commonplace throughout the Marianas.

Today, NMI Chamorros and Guamanian Chamorros disagree strongly on each other's linguistic fluency. An NMI Chamorro would say Guamanian Chamorros speak "broken" Chamorro (i.e., incorrect), whereas a Guamanian Chamorro might consider the form used by NMI Chamorros to be archaic.

== Revitalization efforts ==
Representatives from Guam have unsuccessfully lobbied the United States to take action to promote and protect the language.

In 2013, "Guam will be instituting Public Law 31–45, which increases the teaching of the Chamorro language and culture in Guam schools", extending instruction to include grades 7–10.

Other efforts have been made in recent times, most notably Chamorro immersion schools. One example is Huråo Guåhan Academy at Chamorro Village in downtown Hagåtña. This program is led by Ann Marie Arceo and her husband, Ray. According to the academy's official YouTube page, "Huråo Academy is one if not the first Chamoru Immersion Schools that focus on the teaching of Chamoru language and Self-identity on Guam. Huråo was founded as a non-profit in June 2005." The academy has been praised by many for the continuity of the Chamoru language.

Other creative ways to incorporate and promote the Chamorro language have been found in the use of applications for smartphones, internet videos and television. From Chamorro dictionaries, to the most recent "Speak Chamorro" app, efforts are growing and expanding in ways to preserve and protect the Chamorro language and identity.

On YouTube, a popular Chamorro soap opera Siha has received mostly positive feedback from native Chamorro speakers on its ability to weave dramatics, the Chamorro language, and island culture into an entertaining program. On TV, Nihi! Kids is a first-of-its-kind show, because it is targeted "for Guam's nenis that aims to perpetuate Chamoru language and culture while encouraging environmental stewardship, healthy choices and character development."

In 2019, local news station KUAM News began a series of videos on their YouTube channel, featuring University of Guam's Dr. Michael Bevacqua.

== Phonology ==
Chamorro has 24 phonemes: 18 are consonants and six are vowels.

=== Vowels ===
Chamorro has at least 6 vowels, which include:

- /ɑ/, open back unrounded vowel
- /æ/, near-open front unrounded vowel
- /e/, close-mid front unrounded vowel
- /i/, close front unrounded vowel
- /o/, close-mid back unrounded vowel
- /u/, close back rounded vowel

Table of vowel phonemes of Chamorro
	Front	Back
Close	i	u
Mid	e	o
Open	æ	ɑ

=== Consonants ===
Below is a chart of Chamorro consonants; all are unaspirated.

Table of consonant phonemes of Chamorro
	Labial	Dental/ Alveolar	Palatal	Velar	Glottal
Nasal	m	n	ɲ	ŋ	
Plosive	p b	t d		k ɡ kʷ ɡʷ	ʔ
Affricate		t̪͡s̪ d̪͡z̪			
Fricative	f	s			h
Rhotic		ɾ~ɻ			
Approximant	(w)	l			

- /w/ does not occur initially.
- Affricates /t̪͡s̪ d̪͡z̪/ can be realized as palatal [t͡ʃ d͡ʒ] before non-low front vowels.

=== Historical phonology ===
Words containing *-VC_CV- in Proto-Malayo-Polynesian were often syncopated to *-VCCV-. This is most regular for words containing middle *ə (schwa), e.g. *qaləjaw → atdaw "sun", but sometimes also with other vowels, e.g. *qanitu → anti "soul, spirit, ghost". Then after this syncope, older *ə merged with u. Later, *i and *u were lowered to e and o in closed syllables (*demdem → homhom "dark"), or finally but preceded by a closed syllable (*peResi → fokse "squeeze out", but afok "lime" → afuki "put lime on"). The phonemic split between /ɑ/ and /æ/ is still unexplained. Diphthongs *ay and *aw are still retained in Chamorro, while *uy has become i.

Changes to consonants
PMP	*p	*t	*c	*k	*q
Chamorro	f	t	s	h ∅ (#_) k	∅ (#_) ʔ
PMP	*b	*d	*z	*j	*R
Chamorro	p	h ∅ (_#)	ch	ʔ	g k (_#)
PMP	*l	*h	*w	*y	
Chamorro	l t (_#)	∅	gw g (_{o, u})	y /dz/	

If a word started with a vowel or *h (but not *q), then prothesis with gw or g (before o or u) occurred: *aku → gwahu "I (emphatic)", *enem → gunum "six". Additionally, *-iaC, *-ua(C), and *-auC have become -iyaC, -ugwa(C), and -agoC respectively.

== Grammar ==
Chamorro is a VSO or verb–subject–object language. However, the word order can be very flexible and change to SVO (subject-verb-object), like English, if necessary to convey different types of relative clauses depending on context and to stress parts of what someone is trying to say or convey. Again, that is subject to debate as those on Guam believe the Chamorro word order is flexible, but those in the NMI do not.

Chamorro is also an agglutinative language, whose grammar allows root words to be modified by a number of affixes. For example, masanganenñaihon 'talked a while (with/to)', passive marking prefix ma-, root verb sangan, referential suffix i 'to' (forced morphophonemically to change to e) with excrescent consonant n, and suffix ñaihon 'a short amount of time'. Thus Masanganenñaihon guiʼ 'He/she was told (something) for a while'.

Chamorro has many Spanish loanwords and other words have Spanish etymological roots (such as tenda 'shop/store' from Spanish tienda), which may lead some to mistakenly conclude that the language is a Spanish creole, but Chamorro very much uses its loanwords in an Austronesian way (bumobola 'playing ball' from bola 'ball, play ball' with verbalizing infix -um- and reduplication of the first syllable of root).

Chamorro is a predicate-initial head-marking language. It has a rich agreement system in the nominal and in the verbal domains.

Chamorro is also known for its wh-agreement in the verb. The agreement morphemes agree with features (roughly the grammatical case feature) of the question phrase and replace the regular subject–verb agreement in transitive realis clauses:

Ha faʼgåsi si Juan i kareta.
3sSA wash PND Juan the car
'Juan washed the car.'

Håyi fumaʼgåsi i kareta?
who? WH[NOM].wash the car
'Who washed the car?

=== Pronouns ===
The following set of pronouns is found in Chamorro:

	Free	Absolutive	Ergative	Irrealis	Possessive
1st person singular	guåhu	yuʼ	hu	bai (hu)	-hu/-ku*
2nd person singular	hågu	hao	un	para un / pun	-mu
3rd person singular	guiya	guiʼ	ha	para u / pu	-ña
1st person plural inclusive	hita	hit	ta	para ta	-ta
1st person plural exclusive	hami	ham	in	bai in / bin	-måmi
2nd person plural	hamyu	hamyu	en	para en	-miyu
3rd person plural	siha	siha	ma	uma	-ñiha
* For 1st person singular possessives, the NMI orthography also lists -su and -tu as allomorphs of -hu following words ending in -s and -t, respectively.

== Orthography ==
Chamorro alphabet
Capital		Lowercase	IPA
Guam	NMI	Lowercase	IPA
ʼ (Note: Does not occur word initially)			/ʔ/
A		a	/æ/
Å		å	/ɑ/
B (Note: Does not occur word finally) (Note: Only syllable final when geminate)		b	/b/
CH	Ch	ch	/ts/
D		d	/d/
E		e	/e/
F		f	/f/
G		g	/ɡ/
H		h	/h/
I		i	/i/
K		k	/k/
L		l	/l/
M		m	/m/
N		n	/n/
Ñ		ñ	/ɲ/
NG	Ng	ng	/ŋ/
O		o	/o/
P		p	/p/
R		r	/ɾ/
S		s	/s/
T		t	/t/
U		u	/u/
Y		y	/dz/

The letters ⟨c⟩, ⟨j⟩, ⟨q⟩, ⟨v⟩, ⟨w⟩, ⟨x⟩, and ⟨z⟩ are only used in proper names.

In loanwords, some letter combinations in Chamorro sometimes represent single phonemes. For instance, "ci+[vowel]" and "ti+[vowel]" are both pronounced [ʃ], as in hustisia ('justice') and the surname Concepcion (Spanish influence).

The letter ⟨y⟩ is usually (though not always) pronounced more like [dz] (cf. zheísmo in Rioplatense Spanish); it is also sometimes used to represent the same sound as the letter ⟨i⟩ by Guamanian speakers. The phonemes represented by ⟨n⟩ and ⟨ñ⟩ as well as ⟨a⟩ and ⟨å⟩ are not always distinguished in print. Thus the Guamanian place name spelled ⟨Yona⟩ is pronounced ⟨Dzonia⟩ [dzoɲa], not *[jona] as might be expected. ⟨Ch⟩ is usually pronounced like [ts] rather than like English ch. Chamorro ⟨r⟩ is usually a tap /ɾ/, but is rolled /r/ between vowels, and it is a retroflex approximant /ɻ/, like English r, at the beginning of words. Words that begin with r in the Chamorro lexicon are exclusively loanwords.

Chamorro has geminate consonants which are written double ⟨gg⟩, ⟨dd⟩, ⟨kk⟩, ⟨mm⟩, ⟨ngng⟩, ⟨pp⟩, ⟨ss⟩, and ⟨tt⟩. Its native diphthongs are ⟨ai⟩ and ⟨ao⟩, and ⟨oi⟩, ⟨oe⟩, ⟨ia⟩, ⟨iu⟩, and ⟨ie⟩ occur in loanwords. When ⟨i⟩ and another vowel are in hiatus, (i.e., /i.e/, /i.o/, /i.a/, and /i.u/), they are spelled ⟨ihe⟩, ⟨iho⟩, ⟨iha⟩, and ⟨ihu⟩.

The default stress in Chamorro penultimate stress, except where marked otherwise. If marked at all in writing, it is usually with an acute accent, as in asút 'blue' or dángkulu (NMI) / dǻngkolo (Guam) 'big'. Unstressed vowels are limited to /ə i u/, though they are often spelled ⟨a e o⟩. One main exception is in certain present-continuous conjugations of transitive verbs, as in fagǻgåsi 'washing' or chumóchogui 'doing', in which stress is antepenultimate. Syllables may end in at most one consonant, as in che’lu 'sibling', diskåtga 'unload', mamåhlåo 'shy', oppop 'lie face down', gåtus (Old Chamorro word for 100), or Hagåtña (capital of Guam).

Chamorro language orthography differs between NMI Chamorros and Guamanian Chamorros (example: NMI Chamorro vs. Guamanian CHamoru). In 2021, Guam's Kumisión I Fino' CHamoru (CHamoru Language Commission) released the Utgrafihan CHamoru as the latest spelling standard for the local dialect and place names. The Commonwealth of the Northern Mariana Islands revised their official Chamorro orthography in 2010, which included a version translated into English.

== Vocabulary ==
=== Numbers ===
Current common Chamorro uses only the number words of Spanish origin: uno, dos, tres, etc. Old Chamorro used different number classifiers based on categories: basic numbers (for date, time, etc.), living things, inanimate things, and long objects.

English	Spanish	Modern Chamorro	Old Chamorro			
English	Spanish	Modern Chamorro	Basic Numbers	Living Things	Inanimate Things	Long Objects
one	uno	unu/una (time)	håcha	maisa	hachiyai	takhachun
two	dos	dos	hugua	hugua	hugiyai	takhuguan
three	tres	tres	tulu	tatu	toʼgiyai	taktulun
four	cuatro	kuåttru	fatfat	fatfat	fatfatai	takfatun
five	cinco	singku	lima	lalima	limiyai	takliman
six	seis	sais	gunum	guagunum	gonmiyai	taʼgunum
seven	siete	sietti	fiti	fafiti	fitgiyai	takfitun
eight	ocho	ocho	guåluʼ	guagualu	guatgiyai	taʼgualun
nine	nueve	nuebi	sigua	sasigua	sigiyai	taksiguan
ten	diez	dies	månot	maonot	manutai	takmaonton
hundred	ciento	siento	gåtus	gåtus	gåtus	gåtus/manapo

- The number 10 and its multiples up to 90 are dies (10), benti (20), trenta (30), kuårenta (40), sinkuenta (50), sisenta (60), sitenta (70), ochenta (80), nubenta (90). These are similar to the corresponding Spanish terms diez (10), veinte (20), treinta (30), cuarenta (40), cincuenta (50), sesenta (60), setenta (70), ochenta (80), noventa (90).

=== Days of the week ===
Current common Chamorro uses only the days of the week which are Spanish in origin but are spelled and pronounced differently. There is currently an effort by Chamorro language advocates to introduce or re-introduce native terms for the Chamorro days of the week. However, both major dialects differ in the terminology used. Guamanian advocates support a number-based system derived from Old Chamorro numerals, and structurally parallel to their equivalents in Portuguese; by contrast, whereas the NMI advocates support a more unique system.

English	Spanish	Contemporary Chamorro	Modern Chamorro (NMI dialect)	Modern Chamorro (Guamanian dialect)
Sunday	Domingo	Damenggo/Damenggu	Gonggat	Hachåni (Day One)
Monday	Lunes	Lunes/Lunis	Ha'åni (literally means 'day')	Haguåni (Day Two)
Tuesday	Martes	Måttes/Måttis	Gua'åni	Tulåni (Day Three)
Wednesday	Miércoles	Métkoles/Metkolis	Tolu'åni	Fatfåni (Day Four)
Thursday	Jueves	Huebes/Huebis	Fa'guåni	Limåni (Day Five)
Friday	Viernes	Betnes/Betnis	Nimpu'ak	Gunumåni (Day Six)
Saturday	Sábado	Såbalu	Sambok	Fitåno (Day Seven)

=== Months ===
Before the Spanish-based 12-month calendar became predominant, the Chamoru 13-month lunar calendar was commonly used. The first month in the left column below corresponds with January.

Traditional Chamorro Months
No.	Cunningham	Topping	Kumisión
1	Tumaiguini	Tumaiguini	Tumaiguini
2	Maimo	Maimo	Maimoʼ
3	Umatalaf	Umátalaf	Umatålaf
4	Lumuhu	Lumuhu	Lumuhu
5	Makmamao	Makmamao	Makmamao
6	Mananaf or Fananaf	Mananaf	Manånaf
7	Semo	Semo	Semu
8	Tenhos	Tenhos	Tenhos
9	Lumamlam or Lamlam	Lumamlam	Lumåmlam
10	Fangualoʼ or Faʼgualo	Fagualoʼ	Fangguåloʼ
11	Sumongsong	Sumongsong	Sumongsong
12	Umayanggan	Umayangan	Umayanggan
13	Umagahaf or Omagahaf	---	Umagåhaf

Gregorian Months
No.	English	Topping	Kumisión
1	January	Eneru	Ineru
2	February	Febreru	Fibreru
3	March	Matso	Måtso
4	April	Abrít	Abrit
5	May	Mayu	Måyu
6	June	Junio	Hunio
7	July	Julio	Hulio
8	August	Agosto	Agosto
9	September	Septembre	Septiembre
10	October	Oktubre	Oktubri
11	November	Nobiembre	Nubiembre
12	December	Disiembre	Disiembre

=== Basic phrases ===
Håfa adai! / Håfa dei! (phonetic spelling)	'Hello!'
Buenas [Spanish introduced]	'Greetings'
Kao mamaolek hao?	'How are you? [lit.: Are you doing well?][informal]
Håfa tatatmanu hao?	'How are you? [formal]'
Håyi naʼån mu?	'What is your name?'
I naʼån hu si Chris	'My name is Chris.'
Ñålang yuʼ	'I'm hungry.'
Måʼo yuʼ	'I'm thirsty.'

Adios or Esta [Spanish introduced]	'Good bye.'
Put Fabot [Spanish introduced formal] or Fan [Chamorro informal]	'please'
Fanatåtti [Indigenous]	'leave later [informal]'
Buenas dias [Spanish introduced] or Manana si Yuʼus (mostly used on Guam)	'Good morning.'
Buenas tåtdes [Spanish introduced]	'Good afternoon.'
Buenas noches [Spanish introduced] or Puengen Yuʼus	'Good night.'

Esta/asta agupaʼ	'Until tomorrow'
Si Yuʼus maʼåsiʼ	'Thank you (lit: God have mercy)'
Buen probechu [Spanish introduced] or Hågu mås	'You're welcome'

== Studies ==
Chamorro is studied at the University of Guam, the University of Hawai'i at Mānoa and in several academic institutions of Guam and the Northern Marianas.

Researchers in several countries are studying aspects of Chamorro. In 2009, the Chamorro Linguistics International Network (CHIN) was established in Bremen, Germany. CHiN was founded on the occasion of Chamorro Day (27 September 2009) which was part of the programme of the Festival of Languages. The foundation ceremony was attended by people from Germany, Guam, the Netherlands, New Zealand, Spain, Switzerland, and the United States of America.

== Sample text ==
Article 1 of the Universal Declaration of Human Rights in Chamorro:

Todo taotao siha man mafanago libertao yan pareho gi dignidad yan derecho siha, man manae siha hinaso yan consiencia yan debe de ufatinas contra uno yan otro gi un espiritun chumelo.

Article 1 of the Universal Declaration of Human Rights in English:

All human beings are born free and equal in dignity and rights. They are endowed with reason and conscience and should act towards one another in a spirit of brotherhood.

== Bibliography ==
- Blust, Robert (2000). "Chamorro Historical Phonology". Oceanic Linguistics. 39 (1). University of Hawaii Press: 83–122. doi:10.1353/ol.2000.0002. JSTOR 3623218.
- Chung, Sandra (1983). "Transderivational Relationships in Chamorro Phonology". Language. 59 (1): 35–66. doi:10.2307/414060. JSTOR 414060.
- Chung, Sandra (1998). The Design of Agreement: Evidence from Chamorro. Chicago: University of Chicago Press. ISBN 978-0-226-10607-6.
- Rodríguez-Ponga, Rafael (2003). El elemento español en la lengua chamorra (PhD thesis). Madrid: Complutense University of Madrid. hdl:20.500.14352/63537.
- Rodríguez-Ponga, Rafael (2009). Del español al chamorro. Lenguas en contacto en el Pacífico. Madrid: Ediciones Gondo.
- Topping, Donald M. (1973). Chamorro reference grammar. Honolulu: University of Hawaii Press. ISBN 978-0-8248-0269-1.
- Topping, Donald M.; Ogo, Pedro M.; Dungca, Bernadita C. (1975). Chamorro-English dictionary. Honolulu: University of Hawaii Press. ISBN 978-0-8248-0353-7.
- Topping, Donald M. (1980). Spoken Chamorro: with grammatical notes and glossary (2nd ed.). Honolulu: University of Hawaii Press. ISBN 978-0-8248-0417-6.
