= Kealoha (poet) =

American slam poet

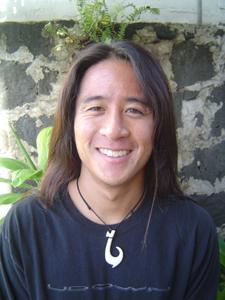
- Kealoha in Honolulu, 2007

Background information
- Born: Steven Kealohapauʻole Hong-Ming Wong
- Genres: Slam Poetry; Spoken word Performance Poetry
- Occupations: Poet Laureate; Slam Poet; Storyteller; Speaker; Educator; Actor
- Instruments: Vocals `Ukulele
- Website: Official Site

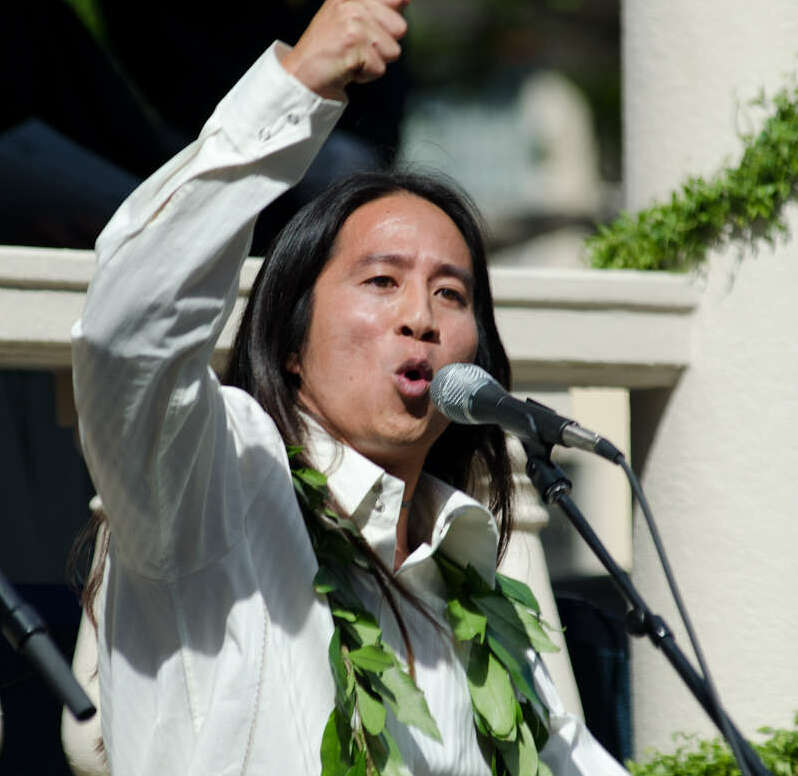
Kealoha speaking at the Gubernatorial inauguration of Neil Abercrombie

Kealoha (born Steven Kealohapau'ole Hong-Ming Wong) is a prominent Indigenous poet and storyteller based in Hawaii. He was the first Poet Laureate of Hawai'i and the first poet to perform at a Hawaii governor's inauguration. In 2022, he received a Poets Laureate Fellowship from the Academy of American Poets.

== Life ==
Kealoha is of Hawaiian, Chinese, and Caucasian descent. He earned a degree in Nuclear Engineering from the Massachusetts Institute of Technology in 1999. Following his graduation, Kealoha conducted nuclear fusion research, worked in management consulting, and taught surfing before pursuing a career in the arts. He became a full-time professional poet in 2002. He currently resides in Honolulu.

== Poetry ==
He has performed throughout the world, including readings at the White House, ʻIolani Palace, the Smithsonian, and the Library of Congress. In 2010, he was honored as a "National Slam Legend" at the National Poetry Slam and was selected as a master artist for a National Endowment for the Arts program. In the genre of storytelling, he has showcased at events such as the National Storytelling Network Conference, the Bay Area Storytelling Festival, and the Honolulu Storytelling Festival.

He is a proponent of "the spoken word," saying "it makes us laugh and cry and wonder and empathize. It provides a mirror for us so we can see who we are as individuals and as a collective. It documents our beliefs and our many cultures through space and time. It expresses all facets of our humanity from the beautiful to the ugly. It shows us what is possible. It inspires us. It shifts our paradigms."

It was exposure to slam poetry that convinced Kealoha to return to Hawaiʻi to become a full-time poet. An early best known work is the performance poem Dichotomy (a.k.a. Hawaiian in the 21st Century), an identity piece that demonstrates conflicting arguments within the Native Hawaiian community. Written in 2004, Dichotomy has been used in classrooms throughout the state of Hawaiʻi to spark debate and dialogue among students. The piece debuted outside of Hawaiʻi in 2007 at the National Poetry Slam, where Kealoha placed eighth individually. Other signature pieces include Recess, The Male Feminist, Destiny, Zoom Out, Chances, and The Story of Everything.

== Career ==
Kealoha is the founder of Hawaii Slam, First Thursdays, and Youth Speaks Hawai'i. He also conducts workshops at schools, libraries, and prisons. In 2005, he was featured in the documentary Hawaii Slam: Poetry in Paradise, which followed four Hawaiian poets' success at a national competition. In 2009, he appeared in HBO's series Brave New Voices.

In 2012, Kealoha was appointed as the first Poet Laureate of Hawai'i by Governor Neil Abercrombie, a position he held until 2022. During his tenure, he promoted poetry and spoken word across the state through performances, educational programs, and community outreach. Kealoha also contributed to the State of Hawai'i's "Can’t Fool the Youth" anti-smoking campaign and was interviewed on PBS's Long Story Short in 2010. The following year, he appeared in the feature film Get a Job as the “bus washing poet.” In 2022, Kealoha delivered a commencement address at the Massachusetts Institute of Technology. In November 2024, he served as writer-in-residence at Punahou School.

== The Story of Everything ==
Kealoha conceived and performed The Story of Everything, described on his official website as his "newest, biggest, and most ambitious work ever." Presented in an epic poem format, the piece is a creation story that traces the origins of existence—from the Big Bang to the present—through an immersive blend of science, storytelling, poetry, movement, music, visual art, and chanting. It draws upon both scientific and cultural knowledge systems to explore the existential question: "Where do we come from?"

Development of The Story of Everything was enabled by a Native Arts and Cultures Foundation Community Inspiration Award, with further support from the National Endowment for the Arts, Engaging the Senses Foundation, Leonard & Rose Freeman Family Fund of the Hawaiʻi Community Foundation, Ford Foundation, and Kalliopeia Foundation.

The live multimedia production toured across the United States—including Honolulu, California, Arkansas, Utah, and Arizona—drawing standing ovations. It featured visual projections by Solomon Enos; music by Taimane and Quadraphonix; ʻōli (chant) by Kauʻi Kanakaʻole; and dance performances by Jamie Nakama, Jonathan Clarke Sypert, and Jory Horn, in collaboration with Wailana Simcock. It was co-directed by Cristian “See” Ellauri, Marc Bamuthi Joseph, and Harry Wong. The performance runs approximately 1 hour and 45 minutes and includes a 15-minute intermission.

The Story of Everything was later adapted into a feature-length film produced by the Engaging the Senses Foundation, and directed by Ron Singer. It premiered in 2022 at the Hawaiʻi International Film Festival and the Maui Film Festival, where it received the People's Choice Award. During its 2023 festival tour, the film earned several accolades: the Special Jury Acting Award (Awareness Film Festival); Best Original Score, Best Documentary Film, and Best Male Actor (Golden Gate Film Festival); an Honorable Mention (Cinema Verde Environmental Film & Arts Festival); and Best Feature Documentary at the Mediterranean Film Festival (Cannes-Milan-Athens). The film also screened publicly at venues including the Skirball Cultural Center, MIT, UC Berkeley, the Honolulu Museum of Art, and the City University of New York.

The project originated in 2011, when Kealoha learned he was going to become a father and sought to create a narrative that would pass down collective knowledge about human origins to his son. His live performances of The Story of Everything received media attention; for instance, Hawaii's *Hawaii News Now* noted its premiere at the Hawaii Theatre as a creation story “only as Kealoha can tell it,” highlighting its multidisciplinary components and framing it as "his most important work." At UC Berkeley, a public screening was described as melding science, environment, traditional Hawaiian arts, and mindfulness in a film that “condenses 13.8 billion years into an hour and 45 minutes.”
