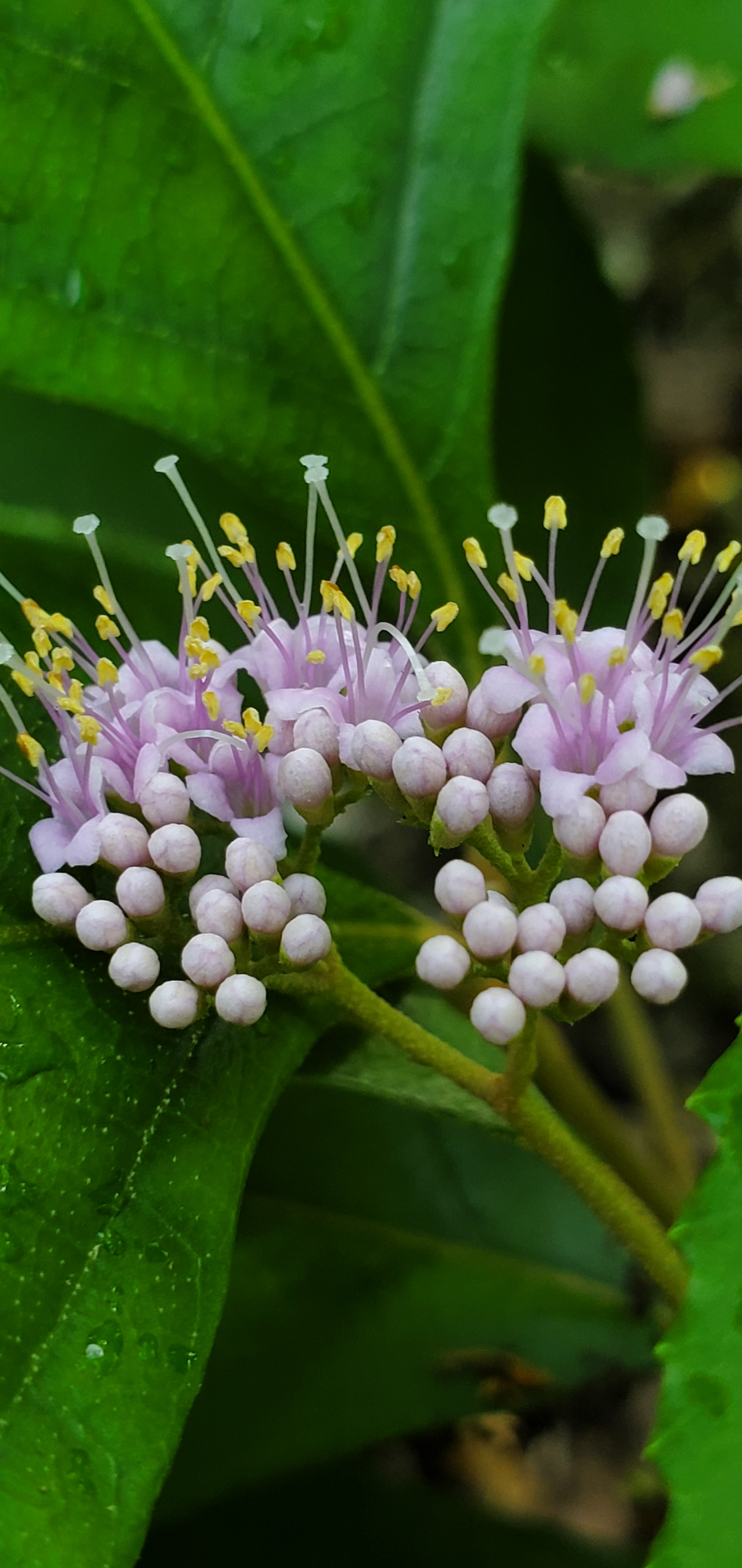

Scientific classification
- Kingdom: Plantae
- Clade: Tracheophytes
- Clade: Angiosperms
- Clade: Eudicots
- Clade: Asterids
- Order: Lamiales
- Family: Lamiaceae
- Genus: Callicarpa
- Species: C. lamii

Binomial name
- Callicarpa lamii Hosok. (1934)

Synonyms
- Callicarpa glabra H.J.Lam (1919), nom. illeg.

= Callicarpa lamii =

Species of plant in the mint family

Callicarpa lamii (Chamorro: hamlag) is a plant in the mint family that is endemic to the Mariana Islands. It is one of two Callicarpa plants endemic to the Mariana Islands, the other being Callicarpa candicans var. paucinervia.

== Description ==
Shrub to small tree with lavender or white flowers. Described by Fosberg & Sachet as being "only rather weakly distinct from C. candicans." Callicarpa lamii was described by Herman Lam (who named it Callicarpa glabra, but was describing specimens from the Marianas), as being a smooth bush 2 meters high:

- Leaves: membranous, "broadly lanceolate, base entire, acute, acuminate at the apex, crenulate margin except at the base, glabrous on both sides with glandular-punctate underside." Leaves 10.5 - 17 cm long, 4.5 - 8 cm wide (a bit larger than the leaves of Callicarpa candicans, which he described as 9 - 11 cm x 4 - 5.5 cm). 14 pairs of nerves (as opposed to the Callicarpa candicans var. paucinervia, which he described as having 7-10 nerves). 4 -5 secondary nerves on each side with a few stellate hairs underneath.
- Petioles 1 - 2 cm long (longer than Callicarpa candicans, which he describes as 1 - 1.2 cm long).
- Cymes dichotomous or trichotomous, sessile, cauliflorous, lax arrangement, few flowers, 2 - 3.5 cm long and wide.
- Peduncles 1.5 - 2 cm long, glabrous or subglabrous.
- Calyx 0.15 cm long with a few stellate hairs, the rim 4-toothed glandular-punctate.
- Pedicels 0.1 - 0.2 cm long; corolla coerulean, glabrous, 4 glandular-punctate stripes, tube 0.3 cm long, lobes 0.1 cm; stamens 0.6 cm long, glandular anthers; style 0.8 cm; ovary glandular-punctate.

== Range and habitat ==
Callicarpa lamii is usually described as being in limestone forest or forest edge, as opposed to Callicarpa candicans var. paucinervia, which is also endemic to the Marianas but is found on coastal limestone cliffs. Callicarpa lamii has been seen at 30-100 meters elevation.

One specimen labelled Callicarpa lamii is listed from the Bonin Islands of Japan (1930), although the species is no longer considered as existing in the Bonin Islands.

Callicarpa lamii has been observed on the following Mariana islands (with date of their latest recorded observation):

- Guam (1984, Ypiga Conservation Area between Yigoa Agafa Gumas, below the Andersen flight descent path)
- Rota (1991, collected from limestone forest of Agupa (Mochong) site at south end of property)
- Aguiguan (1952)
- Tinian (1980, west of As Mahalang, 5 miles north of San Jose village, occasional occurrences on lower slope of Meiogyne cyclindrocarpa-wooded limestone cliff and 1985 on limestone forest on escarpment north of Maga and west of Laderan Mahalang)
- Saipan (1991, in native limestone forest on west-facing cliff of Kagman Peninsula, toward lower slope forest edge)
- Alamagan (1949)
- Pagan (1887 and 1949, north of Marine camp). However, a 2010 survey by USGS found no specimens on Pagan.
- Agrihan. Raulerson also lists the species as existing on the island of Agrihan.

== History ==
The indigenous CHamorro name is listed by Herman Lam as hamlatt or hamlag, which is the same name applied to the coastal species, Callicarpa candicans.

The earliest known specimens were collected in 1887 on Pagan, with labels written in French, but the collector's name is not listed. The species was described and named Callicarpa glabra by Herman Lam in 1919. The specimens described as Callicarpa glabra by Lam were from the Mariana Islands, although the name now refers to a separate species in the Bonin Islands. The Marianas species was later named Callicarpa lamii by Takahide Hosokawa in 1934 or 1924 in the Journal of the Society of Tropical Agriculture. An early spelling was Callicarpa lammii.

William Safford made no reference to the genus Callicarpa in his 1905 book, The Useful Plants of Guam. Raymond Fosberg made only passing reference to the genus Callicarpa in his 1960 The Vegetation of Micronesia. Benjamin C. Stone did not make a distinction between the two species and seems to have considered Callicarpa candicans var. paucinervia to be a synonym of Callicarpa glabra.

== See also ==
List of endemic plants in the Mariana Islands

== Gallery ==
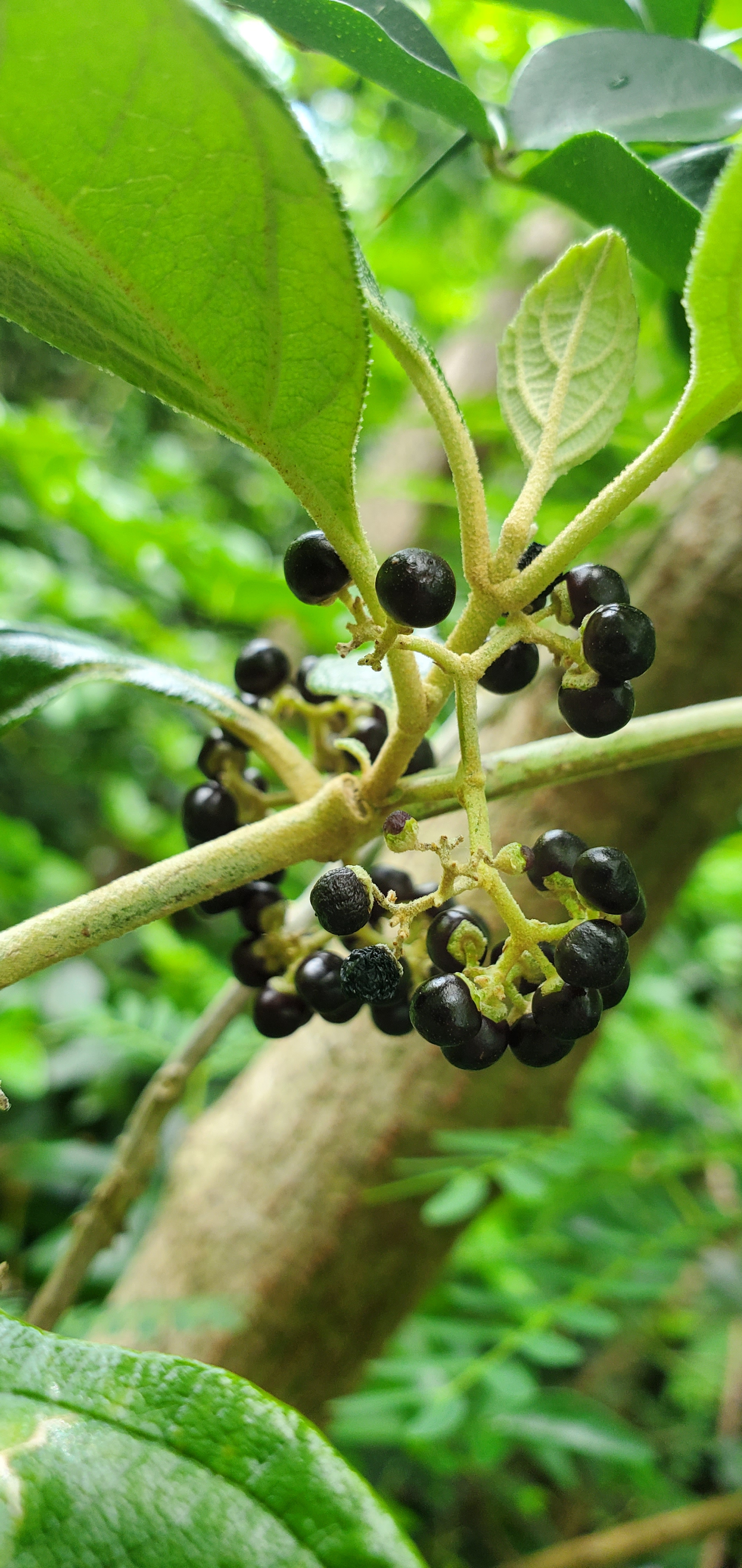
Fruits of Callicarpa lamii, Talofofo, Guam

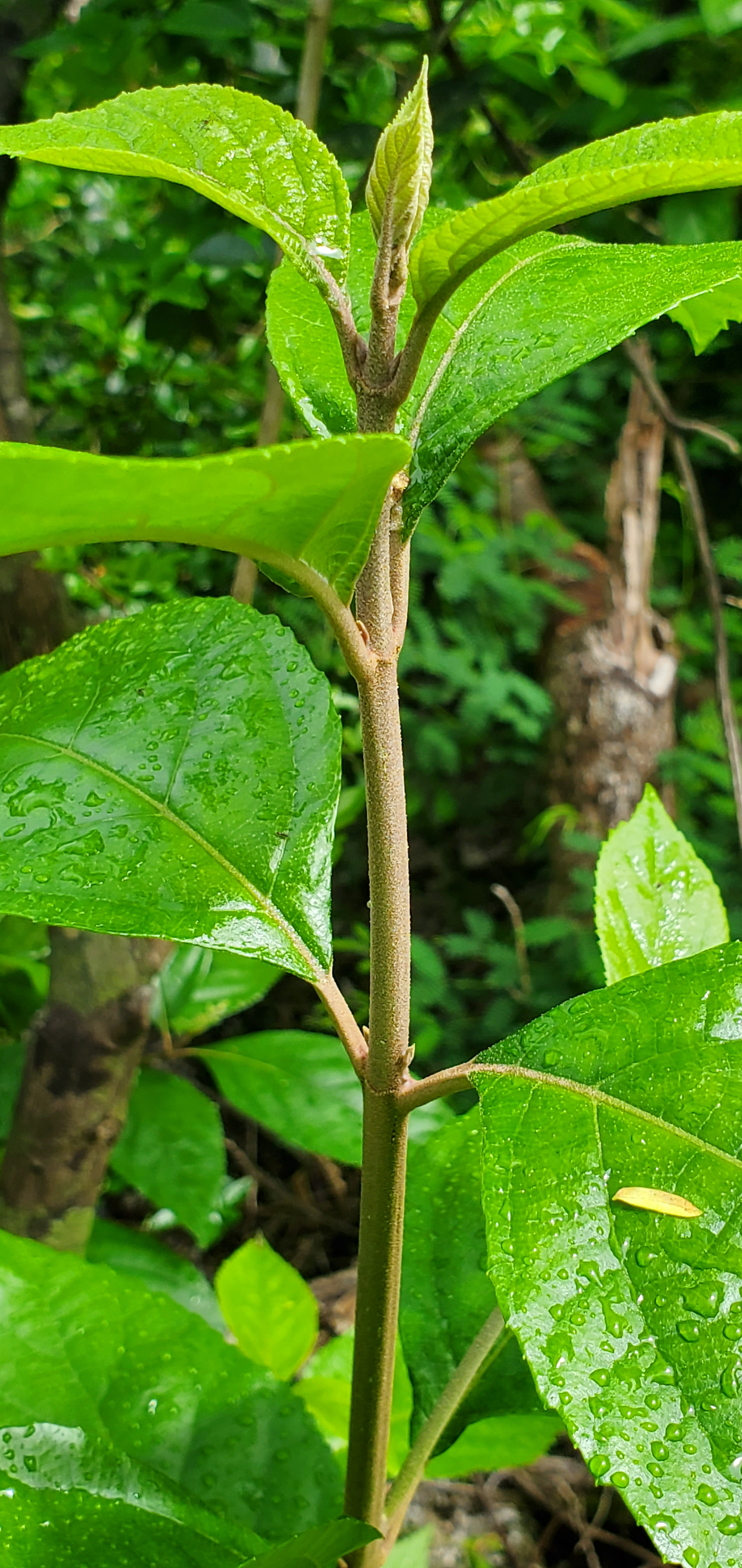
Stem of Callicarpa lamii in limestone secondary forest, Talofofo, Guam

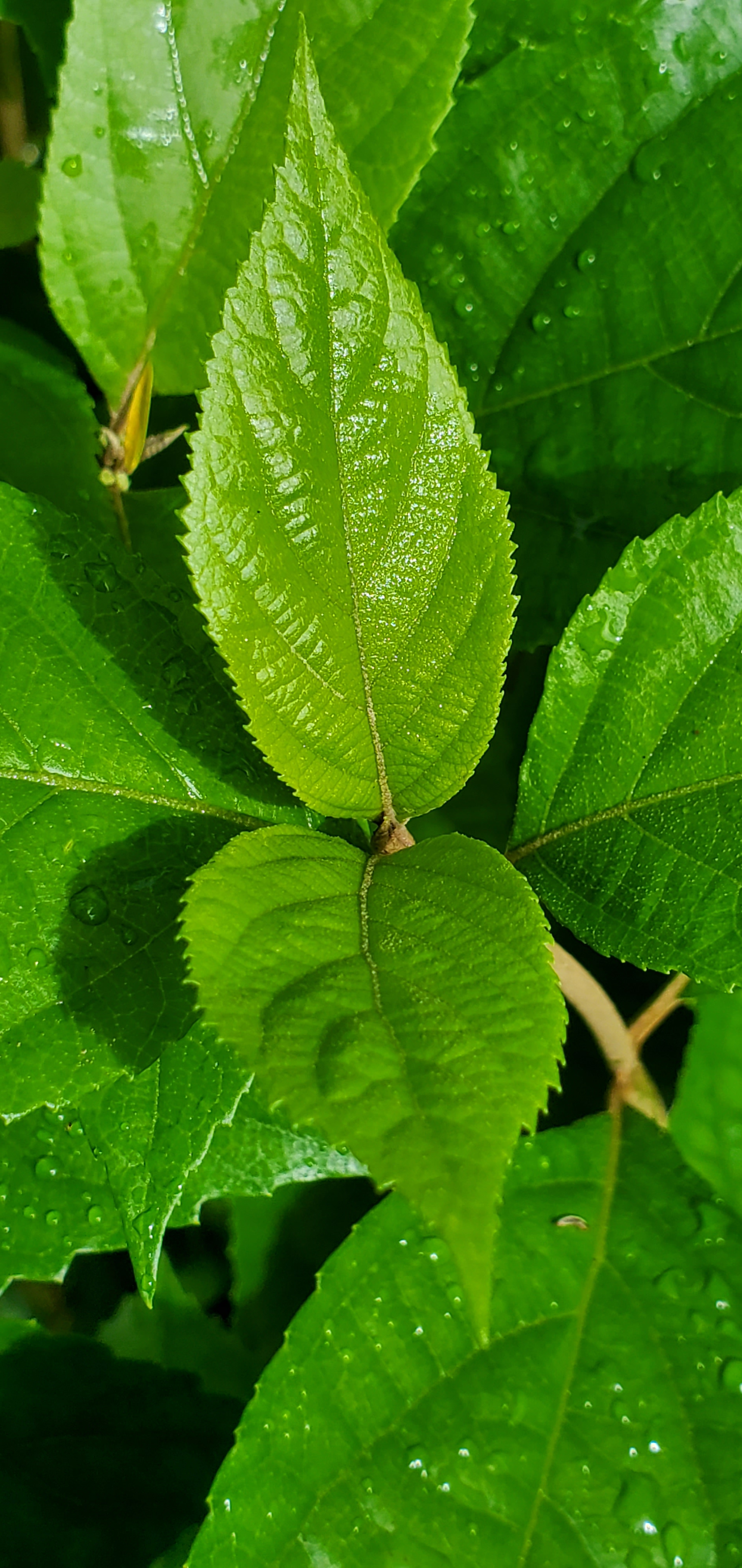
Young leaves of Callicarpa lamii in limestone secondary forest, Talofofo, Guam.

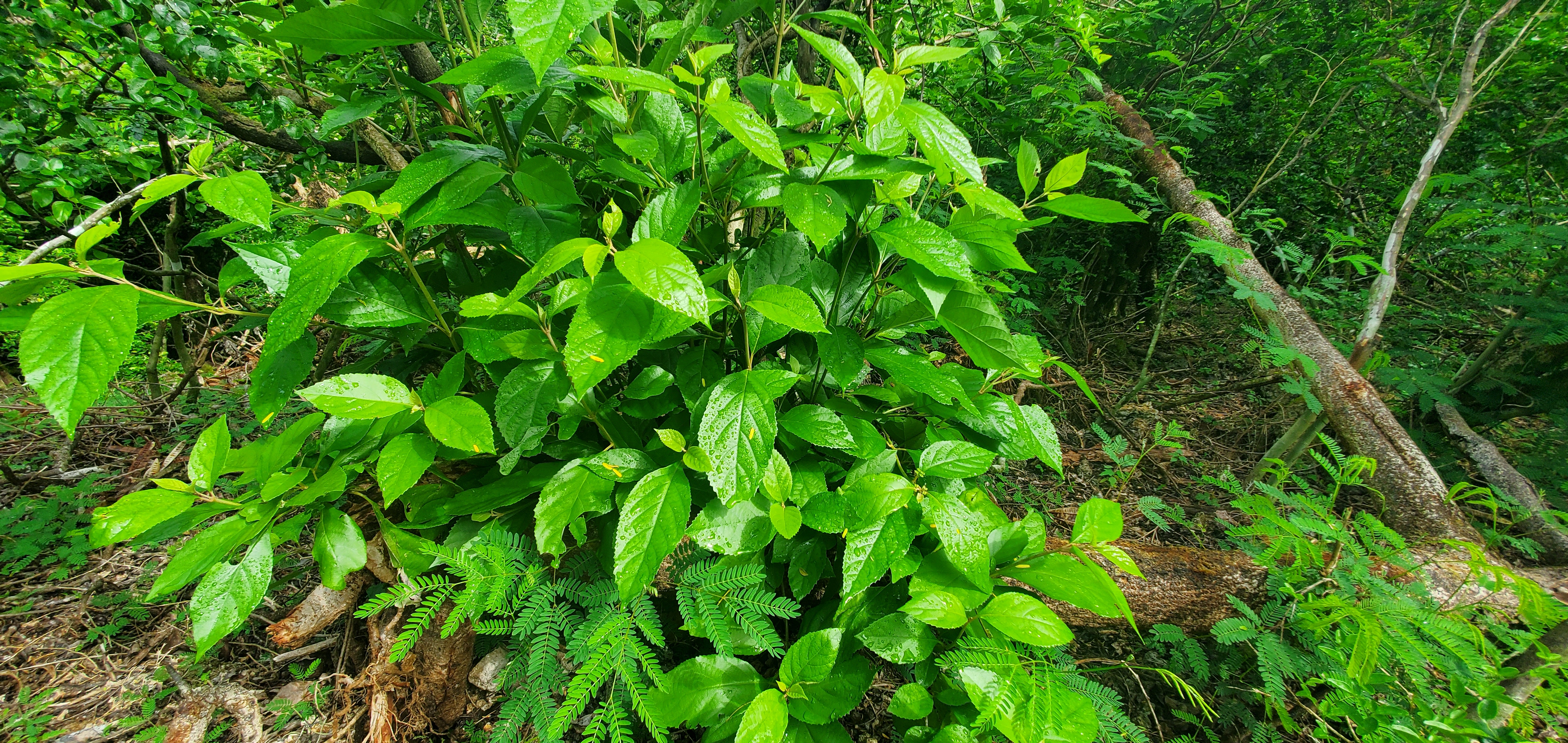
Callicarpa lamii in secondary limestone forest, Talofofo, Guam

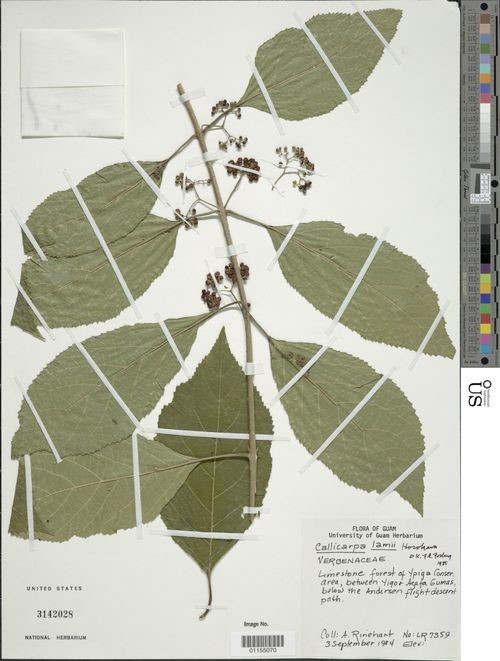
Callicarpa lamii Hosok. herbarium specimen, collected 1984 in Yigo, Guam
