= List of endemic plants in the Mariana Islands =

Micronesia is a biodiversity hotspot with an exceptionally high richness of endemic plant species, 10 times higher than that of Hawaii. The Mariana Islands form an archipelago in the northwest of the Micronesian region.

In 2012, Craig M. Costion and David H. Lorence compiled a list of Micronesian endemic plants, and assessed that the Mariana Islands had 22 endemic plant species (16 species in the southern Mariana Islands, of which 11 were isolated to Guam, and 5 species in the northern Mariana Islands). They concluded that there was an approximately 3% rate of endemism in the Mariana Islands (endemic species per km^{2}), which is comparable to the rates in Hawaii (4%) and Tonga (2%) but lower than the 14% rate of endemism among all Micronesian islands. However, the number of known Marianas endemics has greatly expanded since then with new discoveries, taxonomic revisions, and improvements in digitized databases.

== Plants endemic to the Mariana Islands ==
The following list includes plants that have an endemic range only within the Mariana Islands. "Mariana Islands" is defined in accordance with the World Geographical Scheme for Recording Plant Distributions (WGSRPD), level 3 code "MRN," and includes the following geopolitical territories:

- Guam
- Commonwealth of the Northern Marianas Islands (CNMI)

Only species, subspecies, varieties, and forms that are recognized as "accepted" by the Plants of the World Online database are included in this list; synonyms are not include. Some synonyms are listed next to the accepted name if they are still in common use in recent botanical literature. Subspecies are abbreviated "subs.," varieties "var.," and forms "f." after the species name.

The following list of Marianas endemic plants was compiled based on a list generated by Plants of the World Online, last updated in February 2026. This list may not be complete and may not reflect recent changes in taxonomy. An updated list of accepted species for a geographic area can be generated on the Plants of the World Online.

Plants are listed in order by approximate size of their native range, beginning with those with the most restricted native ranges.

Image	Scientific name	Chamorro name(s)	Order	Native distribution	Conservation status
	Terminalia rostrata Fosberg & Falanruw		Myrtales	Asuncion	
	Leptecophylla mariannensis (Kaneh.) C.M.Weiller		Ericales	Alamagan	
	Psychotria hombroniana (Baill.) Fosberg: Psychotria hombroniana var. mariannensis (Kaneh.) Fosberg; Psychotria hombroniana var. ladronica (Hosok.) Fosberg; Psychotria hombroniana var. hombroniana	Aplokating-palaoan	Rubiales	Psychotria hombroniana: Marianas, Caroline Islands: var. mariannensis: Alamagan; var. ladronica (Hosok.) Fosberg: Rota; var. hombroniana: Marianas	
	Osmoxylon mariannense (Kaneh.) Fosberg & Sachet	No known common name	Apiales	Rota	Critically endangered (IUCN) Endangered (USFWS)
	Nesogenes rotensis Fosberg & D.R.Herbst	No known common name	Lamiales	Rota	Endangered (USFWS)
	Derris mariannensis Hosok.		Fabales	Rota	
	Psychotria rotensis Kaneh.: Psychotria rotensis var. rotensis		Gentianales	Psychotria rotensis: Marianas, Caroline Islands: Psychotria rotensis var. rotensis: Rota	Psychotria rotensis is considered a rare plant on Guam by GPEPP (University of Guam)
	Croton saipanensis Hosok.		Euphorbiales	Saipan	
	Mucuna pacifica Hosok.		Fabales	Saipan	
	Phreatia ladronica Tuyama		Asparagales	Saipan	
	Hedyotis scabridifolia Kaneh.: Hedyotis scabridifolia var. scabridifolia; Hedyotis scabridifolia var. stonei Fosberg		Gentianales	Hedyotis scabridifolia:Marianas: var. scabridifolia: Saipan; var. stonei: Rota, Guam	
	Pogostemon guamensis Lorence & W.L.Wagner	No known common name	Lamiales	Guam (northern limestone cliff faces)	Critically endangered (preliminarily)
	Tinospora homosepala Diels	No known common name	Ranunculales	Guam	Endangered (USFWS)
	Hedyotis megalantha Merr.	Paudedo	Gentianales	Guam	Endangered (USFWS)
	Eugenia bryanii Kaneh.	No known common name	Myrtales	Guam	Endangered (USFWS)
	Psychotria malaspinae Merr.	Aplokating-palaoan	Gentianales	Guam	Endangered (USFWS)
	Elatostema divaricatum (Gaudich.) Fosberg		Rosales	Guam	
	Elatostema stenophyllum Merr.		Rosales	Guam	
	Dianella saffordiana Fosberg & Sachet		Asparagales	Guam	
	Potamogeton marianensis Cham. & Schltdl.		Alismatales	Guam	
	Psychotria andersonii Fosberg		Gentianales	Guam	
	Digitaria gaudichaudii (Kunth) Henrard		Poales	Guam	
	Schleinitzia fosbergii Nevling & Niezgoda		Fabales	Guam	
	Allophylus holophyllus Radlk.	Nget	Ericales	Guam	
	Rhaphidophora guamensis P.C.Boyce		Araceae	Guam	
	Timonius nitidus (Bartl. ex DC.) Fern.-Vill.	Maholoc layu	Gentianales	Guam	
	Syzygium guamense Byng		Myrtales	Guam	
	Bulbophyllum raulersoniae Deloso, Paulino & Cootes		Asparagales	Guam	Proposed by Deloso et al. to be listed as endangered
	Peperomia mariannensis f. saipana (C.DC.) Fosberg		Piperales	Tinian, Saipan (forma saipana) (the species Peperomia mariannensis is endemic to the Marianas and Palau)	
	Crepidium alamaganense (S.Kobay.) T.Yukawa (synonym: Malaxis alamaganensis)		Asparagales	Northern Marianas	
	Dendrobium oblongimentum Hosok. & Fukuy.		Asparagales	Guam (northern), Rota	
	Serianthes nelsonii Merr.	Håyun lågu (Guam) Trongkon guåfi (Rota)	Fabales	Guam, Rota	Endangered (USFWS)
	Bulbophyllum guamense Ames	Siboyas hålom tåno	Asparagales	Guam, Rota	Threatened (USFWS)
	Thelypteris gretheri (W.H.Wagner) B.C.Stone (synonym: Cyclosorus gretheri)		Polypodiales	Guam, Rota	
	Thelypteris guamensis (Holttum) Fosberg & Sachet (synonym: Cyclosorus guamensis)		Polypodiales	Guam, Rota	
	Tabernaemontana rotensis (Kaneh.) B.C.Stone (considered by POWO to be a synonym of the more widespread Tabernaemontana pandacaqui although it was determined by USFWS, using genetic analysis, to be a distinct species.	No known common name	Gentianales	Guam, Rota	Threatened (USFWS) (Tabernaemontana rotensis)
	Syzygium thompsonii	Atoto	Myrtales	Guam, Rota, Saipan	
	Dischidia puberula Decne.		Gentianales	Guam, Rota, Saipan	
	Solanum guamense Merr.	Berenghenas halomtano	Solanales	Marianas	Endangered (USFWS)
	Phyllanthus saffordii Merr.	No known common name	Malpighiales	Marianas	Endangered (USFWS)
	Hedyotis laciniata Kaneh.		Gentianales	Marianas	Considered a rare plant on Guam by GPEPP (University of Guam)
	Claoxylon marianum Müll.Arg.	Katot	Malpighiales	Marianas	Considered a rare plant on Guam by GPEPP (University of Guam)
	Nervilia jacksoniae Rinehart & Fosberg	No known common name	Asparagales	Marianas	Threatened (USFWS)
	Maesa walkeri Fosberg & Sachet	No known common name	Ericales	Marianas	Threatened (USFWS)
	Dendrobium guamense Ames	No known common name	Asparagales	Marianas	Threatened (USFWS)
	Trachoma guamense (Ames) Garay (synonym: Tuberolabium guamense)	No known common name	Asparagales	Marianas	Threatened (USFWS)
	Canavalia megalantha Merr.		Fabales	Marianas	
	Jasminum marianum DC.	Banago	Lamiales	Marianas	
	Eugenia palumbis Merr.	Agatelang	Myrtales	Marianas	
	Drypetes dolichocarpa Kaneh.(synonym: Drypetes rotensis)	Mwelel	Malpighiales	Marianas	
	Macaranga thompsonii Merr.	Pengua	Malpighiales	Marianas	
	Ochrosia mariannensis A.DC.: Ochrosia mariannensis var. mariannensis; Ochrosia mariannensis var. crassicarpa Fosberg & Falanruw	Langiti	Gentianales	Marianas: var. mariannensis (Marianas); var. crassicarpa (Saipan)	
	Discocalyx megacarpa Merr.	Otot	Ericales	Marianas	
	Discocalyx ladronica Mez		Ericales	Marianas	
	Piper guahamense C.DC.	Pupúlu aniti	Piperales	Marianas	
	Piper salicinum Opiz		Piperales	Marianas	
	Ischaemum longisetum Merr.		Poales	Marianas	
	Cyrtandra agrihanensis Ohba		Lamiales	Marianas	
	Premna mariannarum Schauer		Lamiales	Marianas	
	Premna paulobarbata H.J.Lam		Lamiales	Marianas	
	Corchorus tiniannensis Hosok.		Malvales	Marianas	
	Grammatophyllum schmidtianum Schltr.		Asparagales	Marianas	
	Bikkia longicarpa Valeton		Gentianales	Marianas	
	Allophylus laetus Radlk.		Sapindales	Marianas	
	Tarenna sambucina var. glabra (Merr.) Fosberg & Sachet	Smagdara	Gentianales	Marianas	
	Callicarpa lamii Hosok.		Lamiales	Marianas (Guam, Rota, Aguijan, Tinian, Saipan, Alamagan, Pagan, Agrihan)	
	Callicarpa candicans var. paucinervia (Merr.) Fosberg	Hamlag	Lamiales	Marianas	

== Plants endemic to the Pacific islands, including the Mariana Islands ==
The following list includes plants that are native to the Marianas but have a broader native range in Micronesia or the Pacific islands. Plants with native ranges into the Asian continent are not included.

Only species or subspecies that are recognized as "accepted" by the Plants of the World Online database are included in this list (synonyms are not include). Some synonyms are listed with the accepted name if they are still in common use in recent botanical literature. This list is not complete and may not reflect recent changes in taxonomy. An updated and complete list can be generated on the Plants of the World Online.

Plants are listed roughly in order by size of their native range, beginning with plants with the most restricted native ranges.

Image	Scientific name	Chamorro name(s)	Order	Native Distribution	Conservation status
	Phreatia thompsonii Ames		Asparagales	Guam, Pohnape	
	Meryta senfftiana Volkens		Apiales	Saipan to Caroline Islands	
	Phyllanthus marianus Müll.Arg.	Gaogao uchan	Malpighiales	Marianas to Caroline Islands (Ulithi)	
	Psychotria mariana Bartl. ex DC.	Aplokating	Gentianales	Marianas to Caroline Islands (Fais)	
	Ixora triantha Volkens	Guaguat	Gentianales	Marianas, Caroline Islands (Yap)	
	Elaeocarpus joga Merr.	Yoga	Oxalidales	Marianas, Caroline Islands (Palau)	
	Zeuxine fritzii Schltr.		Asparagales	Marianas, Caroline Islands (Palau)	
	Zeuxine ovata (Gaudich.) Garay & W.Kittr.		Asparagales	Marianas, Caroline Islands (Palau)	
	Artocarpus mariannensis Trécul	Dugdug	Rosales	Marianas to Caroline Islands (Palau)	
	Heritiera longipetiolata Kaneh.	Ufa hålom tåno'	Malvales	Marianas to Caroline Islands (Pohnpei)	Endangered (USFWS)
	Phyllanthus mariannensis Müll.Arg. (synonym: Glochidion marianum)	Chosgu	Malpighiales	Guam and Caroline Islands	
	Taeniophyllum marianense Schltr.		Asparagales	Marianas, Caroline Islands	
	Hedyotis fruticulosa (Volkens) Merr.		Gentianales	Marianas, Caroline Islands	
(Photo not from the Marianas)	Ficus microcarpa var. saffordii (Merr.) Corner	Nunu (same common name as Ficus prolixa)	Rosales	Marianas, Caroline Islands	
	Tephrosia mariana DC.		Fabales	Marianas, Caroline Islands	
	Sporobolus farinosus Hosok.		Poales	Marianas, Caroline Islands	
	Coelogyne guamensis Ames		Asparagales	Marianas, Caroline Islands	
	Thelypteris maemonensis (W.H.Wagner & Grether) B.C.Stone (synonym: Cyclosorus maemonensis)		Polypodiales	Marianas, Caroline Islands	
	Elatostema calcareum Merr.	Tupun ayuyu	Rosales	Marianas, Caroline Islands	
	Xylosma nelsonii Merr.		Malpighialies	Marianas, Caroline Islands	
	Gymnosporia thompsonii Merr. (synonym: Maytenus thompsonii)	Luluhot	Celastrales	Marianas to Caroline Islands	
	Aglaia mariannensis Merr.	Mapuñao	Sapindales	Marianas to Caroline Islands	
(Photo may not be from the Marianas)	Melastoma malabathricum var. mariannum (Naudin) Fosberg & Sachet	Gafao	Myrtales	Marianas, Caroline Islands	
	Sphaeropteris aramaganensis (Kaneh.) R.M.Tryon		Cyatheales	South Kazan-retto to Marianas	
	Digitaria mezii Kaneh.		Poales	Marianas, New Guinea	
	Cycas micronesica K.D.Hill	Fadang	Cycadales	Marianas, Caroline Islands, Marshall Islands)	Endangered (IUCN); Threatened (USFWS)
	Melochia villosissima (C.Presl) Merr.	Sayåfii	Malvales	Kazan-retto (Minami-Iōtō) to northwestern Pacific (Caroline Is., Marianas)	
	Myoporum boninense Koidz.		Lamiales	Ogasawara-shoto, Marianas, New South Wales	
(Photo not from the Marianas)	Ixora casei Hance		Gentianales	Northwest Pacific to Gilbert Islands (Caroline Is., Gilbert Is., Marianas, Marshall Is.)	
	Dendrocnide latifolia (Gaudich.) Chew	Kahtat	Rosales	Solomon Islands to W. Pacific (Caroline Is., Marianas, New Caledonia, Solomon Is., Vanuatu)	
	Freycinetia reineckei Warb.	Fianiti	Pandanales	Western Pacific (Caroline Is., Marianas, Samoa, Vanuatu)	
	Myrtella bennigseniana (Volkens) Diels		Myrtales	Marianas, Caroline Is., New Guinea	
	Hernandia labyrinthica Tuyama		Laurales	Marianas, New Guinea, Solomon Is.	
	Medinilla medinillana (Gaudich.) Fosberg & Sachet		Myrtales	Sulawesi, Maluku New Guinea, and Marianas	
	Leptopetalum foetidum (G.Forst.) Neupane & N.Wikstr.		Gentianales	Cook Is., Fiji, Marianas, New Caledonia, Niue, Samoa, Tonga, Tubuai Is., Vanuatu	
(Photo not from the Marianas)	Vitex cofassus Reinw. ex Blume		Lamiaceae	Bismarck Archipelago, Caroline Is., Maluku, Marianas, New Guinea, Solomon Is., Sulawesi	
	Ficus prolixa G.Forst.	Nunu (same common name as Ficus microcarpa var. microcarpa)	Moraceae	Caroline Is., Cook Is., Fiji, Gilbert Is., Line Is., Marianas, Marquesas, Nauru, New Caledonia, Niue, Pitcairn Is., Samoa, Society Is., Tonga, Tuamotu, Tubuai Is., Tuvalu, Vanuatu, Wallis-Futuna Is.	
(Photo not from the Marianas)	Eugenia reinwardtiana (Blume) DC.	A'abang	Myrtales	Jawa (Kangean Island) to Pacific (Borneo, Caroline Is., Cook Is., Fiji, Hawaii, Jawa, Lesser Sunda Is., Maluku, Marianas, Marquesas, New Guinea, Niue, Pitcairn Is., Queensland, Samoa, Society Is., Tonga, Tuamotu, Tubuai Is., Vanuatu, Western Australia)	
	Merrilliodendron megacarpum (Hemsl.) Sleumer	Faniok	Icacinales	Philippines to W. Pacific (Bismarck Archipelago, Caroline Is., Marianas, New Guinea, Philippines, Santa Cruz Is., Solomon Is., Sulawesi, Vanuatu)	
	Capparis spinosa subsp. cordifolia (Lam.) Fici (synonym: Capparis mariana)	Atkåpares	Brassicales	Central Malesia to western and southern Pacific (Caroline Is., Cook Is., Fiji, Lesser Sunda Is., Marianas, Marshall Is., Nauru, New Caledonia, New Guinea, Niue, Philippines, Pitcairn Is., Samoa, Society Is., Solomon Is., Tonga, Tuamotu, Tubuai Is., Vanuatu, Wallis-Futuna Is.)	
(Specimen not from the Marianas)	Grewia prunifolia A.Gray	Agilau	Malvales	Cook Is., Fiji, Marianas, New Caledonia, Niue, Samoa, Society Is., Tonga, Tuamotu, Tubuai Is., Vanuatu, Wallis-Futuna Is.	
(Specimen not from the Marianas)	Gynochthodes myrtifolia (synonym: Morinda umbellata var. glandulosa (Merr.) Fosberg)		Gentianales	G. myrtifolia: western and southern Pacific (Caroline Is., Cook Is., Fiji, Marianas, Marquesas, New Caledonia, Niue, Pitcairn Is., Samoa, Society Is., Tonga, Tuamotu, Tubuai Is., Vanuatu, Wallis-Futuna Is.)	Considered a rare plant on Guam by GPEPP (University of Guam) (listed as Morinda umbellata)
(Photo not from the Marianas)	Heliotropium anomalum Hook. & Arn.		Boraginales	Caroline Is., Cook Is., Hawaii, Line Is., Marianas, New Caledonia, Niue, Pitcairn Is., Society Is., Tuamotu, Tubuai Is., Wake I.	
	Geniostoma rupestre var. glaberrimum (Benth.) B.J.Conn	Måhlok håyu Anasser	Gentianales	Solomon Islands to western and southern Pacific (Caroline Is., Fiji, Marianas, New Caledonia, Niue, Pitcairn Is., Samoa, Santa Cruz Is., Society Is., Tonga, Tubuai Is., Vanuatu, Wallis-Futuna Is.)	
(Specimen not from the Marianas)	Solanum repandum G.Forst. (synonym: Solanum mariannense)		Solanales	Bismarck Archipelago, Cook Is., Fiji, Marianas, Marquesas, Niue, Pitcairn Is., Society Is., Vanuatu (Solanum mariannense previously reported to be endemic to Rota)	
	Sphaeropteris lunulata (G.Forst.) R.M.Tryon (often listed as its synonym, Cyathea lunulata (G.Forst.) Copel.	Chacha	Cyatheales	Bismarck Archipelago to western Pacific (Bismarck Archipelago, Caroline Is., Fiji, Marianas, Samoa, Santa Cruz Is., Solomon Is., Sulawesi, Tonga, Vanuatu, Wallis-Futuna Is.)	Cyathea lunulata (synonymous name) is considered a rare plant on Guam by GPEPP (University of Guam)
	Cocos nucifera L.	Niyok (coconut)	Arecales	Central Malesia to SW. Pacific (Bismarck Archipelago, Maluku, New Guinea, Philippines, Queensland, Samoa, Santa Cruz Is., Solomon Is., Tonga, Vanuatu)	
	Bikkia tetrandra (L.f.) A.Rich.	Gausali	Gentianales	New Guinea to western Pacific (Caroline Is., Fiji, Marianas, New Caledonia, New Guinea, Niue, Solomon Is., Tonga, Vanuatu, Wallis-Futuna Is.)	
	Polyscias macgillivrayi (Benth.) Harms Synonym: Polyscias grandifolia	Pepega	Apiales	New Guinea to western Pacific (Bismarck Archipelago, Caroline Is., Gilbert Is., Marianas, New Guinea, Queensland, Santa Cruz Is., Solomon Is.)	
	Meiogyne cylindrocarpa (Burck) Heusden	Paipai	Magnoliales	Malesia to Marianas and N. Australia (Borneo, Jawa, Marianas, New Guinea, Northern Territory, Philippines, Queensland, Vanuatu, Western Australia)	
(Photo not from the Marianas)	Paratrophis pendulina (Endl.) E.M.Gardner (synonym: Streblus pendulinus)		Rosales	E. New Guinea to E. Australia and Pacific (Caroline Is., Fiji, Hawaii, Marianas, New Caledonia, New Guinea, New South Wales, Norfolk Is., Queensland, Tubuai Is., Vanuatu)	
(Photo not from the Marianas)	Psydrax odoratus subsp. odoratus		Gentianales	Caroline Is., Fiji, Hawaii, Marianas, Marquesas, New Caledonia, New Guinea, Pitcairn Is., Society Is., Tonga, Tuamotu, Tubuai Is., Vanuatu	
(Photo not from the Marianas)	Schoenus maschalinus Roem. & Schult.		Cyperaceae	Chatham Is., Marianas, New Guinea, New South Wales, New Zealand North, New Zealand South, Philippines, Queensland, South Australia, Sumatera, Tasmania, Victoria	
	Tristiropsis acutangula (synonym, Tristiropsis obtusangula)	Fai'a	Sapindales	Bismarck Archipelago, Borneo, Caroline Is., Christmas I., Jawa, Lesser Sunda Is., Maluku, Marianas, New Guinea, Philippines, Queensland, Solomon Is., Sulawesi	
(Specimen not from the Marianas)	Trichomanes atrovirens (C.Presl) Kunze		Hymenophyllaceae	Bismarck Archipelago, Caroline Is., Maluku, Nansei-shoto, New Guinea, New South Wales, Norfolk Is., Philippines, Queensland, Santa Cruz Is., Solomon Is., Sulawesi, Vanuatu	
(Photo not from the Marianas)	Fagraea berteroana A.Gray ex Benth.		Gentianales	Papuasia to Pacific (Bismarck Archipelago, Caroline Is., Cook Is., Fiji, Gilbert Is., Marianas, Marquesas, Nauru, New Caledonia, New Guinea, Niue, Queensland, Samoa, Society Is., Solomon Is., Tonga, Tubuai Is., Vanuatu, Wallis-Futuna Is.)	
(Photo not from the Marianas)	Asplenium laserpitiifolium Lam.		Polypodiales	Nansei-shoto to Malesia and Pacific (Bismarck Archipelago, Caroline Is., Fiji, Kazan-retto, Lesser Sunda Is., Maluku, Marianas, Marquesas, Nansei-shoto, New Caledonia, New Guinea, Niue, Ogasawara-shoto, Philippines, Queensland, Samoa, Society Is., Solomon Is., Sulawesi, Tonga, Tubuai Is., Vanuatu, Wallis-Futuna Is.)	Considered a rare plant on Guam by GPEPP (University of Guam)
(Photo not from the Marianas)	Alyxia stellata (J.R.Forst. & G.Forst.) Roem. & Schult.	Lodosong lahe Nanago	Gentianales	Northeast Queensland to Pacific (Caroline Is., Cook Is., Fiji, Hawaii, Marianas, Marquesas, New Caledonia, Niue, Pitcairn Is., Queensland, Samoa, Society Is., Solomon Is., Tonga, Tuamotu, Tubuai Is., Vanuatu, Wallis-Futuna Is.)	
(Photo not from the Marianas)	Pandanus tectorius Parkinson	Kafo Aggag	Pandanales	Philippines to Pacific and eastern Australia (Bismarck Archipelago, Caroline Is., Cocos (Keeling) Is., Cook Is., Fiji, Gilbert Is., Hawaii, Jawa, Lesser Sunda Is., Line Is., Maluku, Marianas, Marquesas, Marshall Is., Nauru, New Caledonia, New Guinea, New South Wales, Niue, Philippines, Pitcairn Is., Queensland, Samoa, Santa Cruz Is., Society Is., Solomon Is., Tokelau-Manihiki, Tonga, Tuamotu, Tubuai Is., Tuvalu, Vanuatu, Wake I., Wallis-Futuna Is.)	

== Plants formerly considered or currently proposed to be endemic to the Mariana Islands ==
The following list includes select species or variants that have previously been considered endemic to the Mariana Islands, and may still be listed as such in certain publications, but are not considered to be valid species according to the Plants of the World Online database. Also included here are species that have more recently been proposed to be distinct species or subspecies, but have not yet been accepted.

Scientific name	Chamorro name(s)	Order	Native Distribution	Conservation status
Korthalsella species (unnamed species presented at Micronesia Terrestrial Conservation Conference)		Santalales		
Zehneria guamensis (Merr.) Fosberg	Ahgaga	Cucurbitales	Despite its species name, it is listed as native to China South-Central, China Southeast, Marianas, Nansei-shoto, Taiwan. However, it is elsewhere described as a Marianas endemic.	Considered a rare plant on Guam by GPEPP (University of Guam)
Carallia tulasnei Baill (unplaced name)		Malpighiales	Marianas	
Melanolepis multiglandulosa var. glabrata (Müll.Arg.) Fosberg (now considered a synonym of the more widespread Melanolepis multiglandulosa (Reinw. ex Blume) Rchb. & Zoll.)	Ålom	Malpighiales	Melanolepis multiglandulosa var. glabrata (previously reported to be endemic to the Marianas) Melanolepis multiglandulosa (S. Indo-China to Nansei-shoto and NW. Pacific, including Marianas)	
Ceratopteris gaudichaudii Brongn. (now considered a synonym of the pan-tropical Ceratopteris thalictroides (L.) Brongn.)		Polypodiales	Ceratopteris gaudichaudii: Ceratopteris thalictroides: pan-tropical/subtropical	
Cerbera dilatata Markgr. (now considered a synonym of Cerbera odollam Gaertn.)	Chiute	Gentianales	Cerbera dilatata: previously listed as a Marianas endemic Cerbera odollam: South India to Pacific	

== See also ==
- List of threatened, endangered and extinct species in the Mariana Islands
