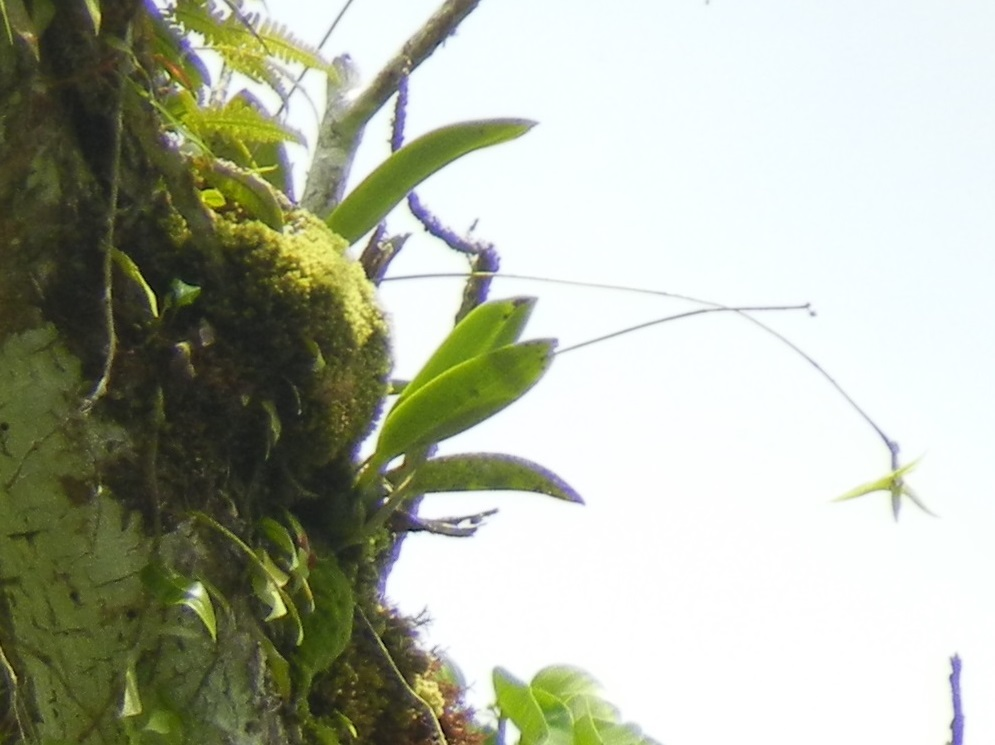

Scientific classification
- Kingdom: Plantae
- Clade: Tracheophytes
- Clade: Angiosperms
- Clade: Monocots
- Order: Asparagales
- Family: Orchidaceae
- Subfamily: Epidendroideae
- Genus: Bulbophyllum
- Species: B. guamense

Binomial name
- Bulbophyllum guamense Ames (1914)

= Bulbophyllum guamense =

Species of orchid

Bulbophyllum guamense is a species of orchid in the genus Bulbophyllum. It is native to the islands of Guam and Rota in the Mariana Islands.

== See also ==
- List of endemic plants in the Mariana Islands
