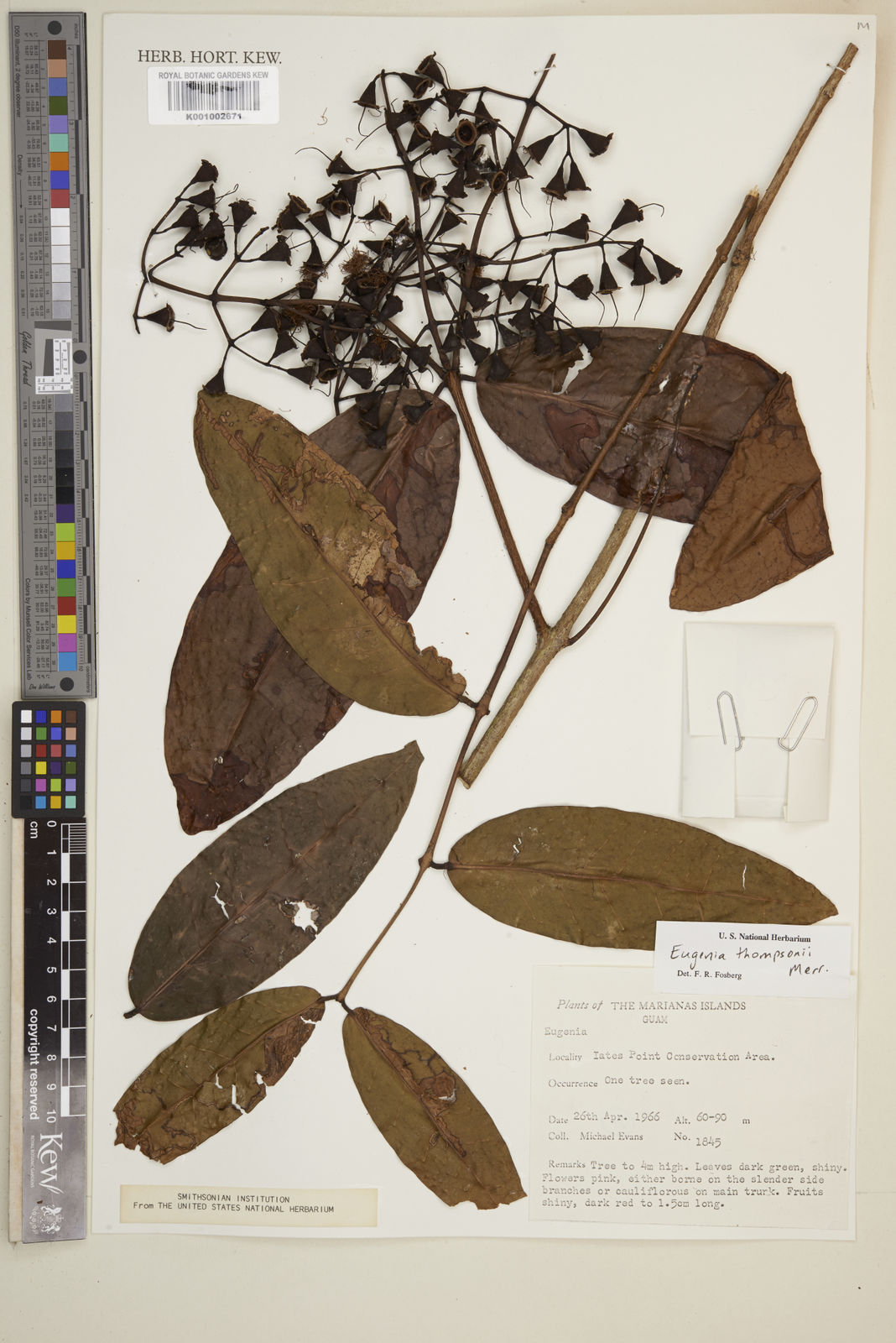
- A specimen from Kew's herbarium

Scientific classification
- Kingdom: Plantae
- Clade: Embryophytes
- Clade: Tracheophytes
- Clade: Spermatophytes
- Clade: Angiosperms
- Clade: Eudicots
- Clade: Rosids
- Order: Myrtales
- Family: Myrtaceae
- Genus: Syzygium
- Species: S. thompsonii

Binomial name
- Syzygium thompsonii (Merr.) N.Snow (2010)

Synonyms
- Eugenia thompsonii Merr. (1914); Jambosa thompsonii (Merr.) Diels

= Syzygium thompsonii =

Plant of the Marianas islands

Syzygium thompsonii (Chamorro: atoto) is an endemic tree of the Mariana Islands of Guam, Rota, and Saipan with a striking appearance due to its abundance of white flowers and edible fruit that grow directly from the trunk. It is related to the Malay apple but bears smaller tart fruit.

== Description ==
Edward D. Merrill, in An Enumeration of the Plants of Guam (1914), described the tree from specimens sent to him from Guam:

- "A tall tree, quite glabrous. Branches and branchlets terete, reddish-brown or sometimes grayish-red, mostly smooth. Leaves opposite, coriaceous, oblong-ovate to oblong-lanceolate, 10 to 18 cm long, 3 to 6.5 cm wide, the base rather abruptly and broadly rounded, distinctly cordate, narrowed above to the acute or obtuse apex, the margins somewhat recurved, upper surface brownish-olivaceous, shining, the lower somewhat paler, dull or but slightly shining; lateral nerves about 10 on each side of the midrib, distant, anastomosing, the reticulations lax; petioles stout, 3 mm long or less. Flowers in panicles which are fascicled on the trunk, the panicles 10 to 20 cm long, narrowly pyramidal, the lower branches 5 to 7 cm long, the upper shorter, all opposite, 3 or 4 pairs to each panicle, mostly spreading. Flowers for the most part in threes at the ends of the ultimate branchlets, their pedicels short, 1 to 3 mm long. Calyx funnel-shaped, 8 to 10 mm long, the lobes 4, very broad and short, not prominent. Petals 4, free, orbicular-reniform, rounded, 6 to 7 mm in diameter, prominently glandular. Stamens indefinite; filaments 6 to 8 mm long; anthers 1 mm long. Fruit when dry about 1.5 cm long, 1 cm in diameter, truncate, black, base rounded, ovoid-ellipsoid."

The taxonomic key by Ryozo Kanehira indicates that the leaves are 8–14 cm (3.1–5.5 in) long.

Benjamin Stone, in The Flora of Guam (1970), mostly quotes Merrill's description, except:

- The leaf measurements are 8–18 cm (3.1–7.1 in) long, 3–8 cm (1.2–3.1 in) wide.
- Panicles of flowers may arise from the first branch or the trunk.
- Panicles of flowers may have a few basal pairs of leaves (or none), branches about 4–8 cm (1.6–3.1 in) long.
- Fruit subglobose-ovoid and colored dark red.
- Fruits contain 1 or 2 seeds.

Neil Snow & Jan Veldkamp wrote in Austrobaileya (2010) that the specimens from Guam seemed to "have more or less flattened branchlets with buds 11-13 mm long." This differed from specimens from Rota and Saipan, which "tend to be slightly 4-angled and have buds (6-)7-8.5 mm long," suggesting these qualify as separate subspecies.

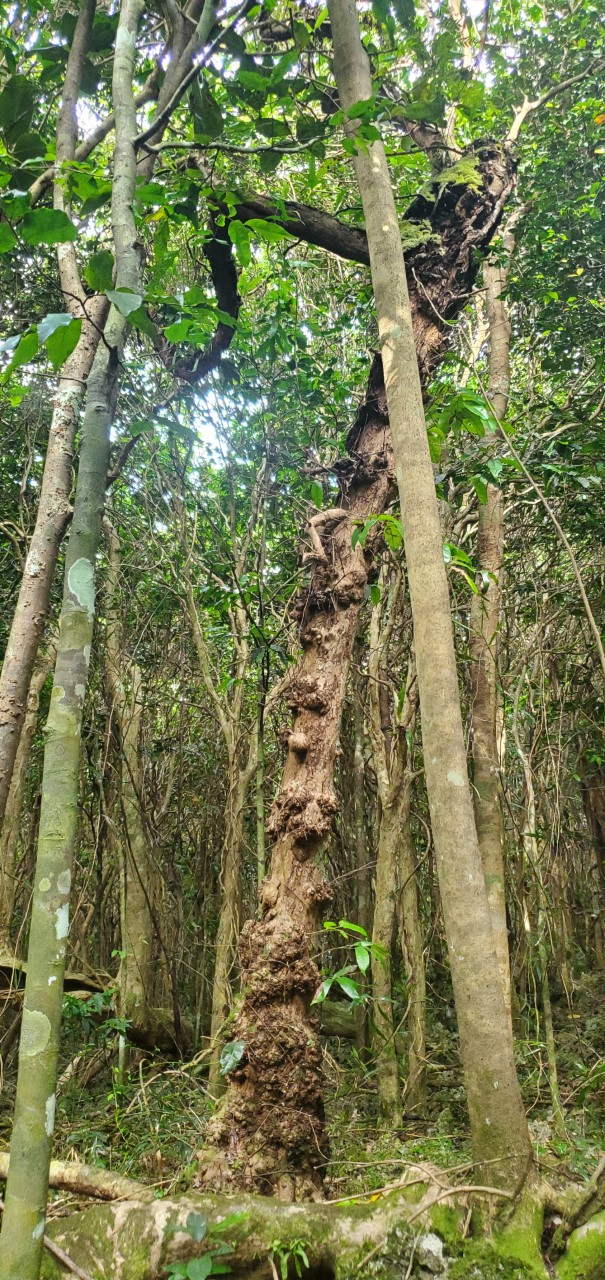
A particularly old specimen of Syzygium thompsonii in limestone karst of northern Guam. Demonstrates tall and narrow growth habit and shows where stems and fruits have emerged from the trunk over the years.

== Distribution and habitat ==
Syzygium thompsonii is a canopy tree found in limestone forests. It is listed as endemic only to the 3 southernmost Mariana islands: Guam, Rota and Saipan. On Guam, the tree is only found in the northern limestone forest. The Smithsonian's US National Herbarium holds specimens from Saipan, collected from Water Cave and the north slope of Mt. Tapochau, It also holds specimens from Rota, collected from the limestone forest at the start of the last ascent into the savanna, and another from the high limestone area below the top cliffs of the western end of Rota.

== Ecology ==
Although the critically endangered Rota white-eye (Zosterops rotensis) is primarily insectivorous, it has been observed feeding on various fruits, including that of Syzygium thompsonii.

No insects were reported to have been collected from Syzygium thompsonii, based on a search of the Bishop Museum's Insects of Micronesia publications between 1955 and 2017.

A 2016-2017 survey of the Northwest Field in northern Guam observed 36 specimens of the federally threatened orchid, Tuberolabium guamense, growing on three Syzygium thompsonii trees.

== Conservation status ==
Syzygium thompsonii has not been assessed by the International Union for Conservation of Nature (IUCN). A 2000 survey of plots on Anderson Airforce Base in northern Guam found no Syzygium thompsonii trees, nor did the 2008 Botanical Survey of the War in the Pacific National Historical Park Guam, which includes limestone forest in west-central Guam. A 2013 forest inventory identified Syzygium thompsonii on only two of 48 island-wide plots, but estimated there were 178,000 trees on Guam (although with a substantial sampling error of 172,000). This inventory found Syzygium thompsonii to be the 29th most common tree of 49 species listed. Syzygium thompsonii accounted for 0.24% of all trees identified. All specimens were small, measuring between 1.0- and 4.9-inches diameter at breast height. The 2016-2017 survey of the Northwest Field on Guam found Syzygium thompsonii occurrence as "Occasional."

== History ==
Syzygium thompsonii is not mentioned by Charles Gaudichaud-Beaupré in his 1826 botanical review of the 1819 Freycinet Expedition of the Marianas, nor by William E. Safford in his 1905 Useful Plants of Guam. The earliest known specimens were collected in 1912 by John B. Thompson, who was the Special Agent in Charge at the US Department of Agriculture's Guam Agricultural Experiment Station on Guam. The species was first described in 1914 by E.D. Merrill in The Philippine Journal of Science, based on specimens sent to him by Thompson. Merrill originally named the species Eugenia thompsonii sp. nov. in recognition of Thompson. These early specimens were spared from the destruction of the National Herbarium of the Philippines during World War II and are now kept in the Royal Botanic Gardens of Kew, the Herbarium Pacificum of the Bernice Bishop Museum, Hawaii, and the US National Herbarium in Washington, D.C. Merrill includes a description of the tree as a "striking species" due to its foliage and the abundance of cauline flowers (growing directly from the trunk).

Ludwig Diels (1921) provided a brief description of the tree, which he named Jambosa thompsonii. He also provided the indigenous name "makupa halomtano," måkupa being the Chamorro name for the Malay apple, which is cultivated on Guam, and hålom tåno' meaning literally "interior land."

The first known record of the Chamorro name "atoto" is reported to be by Fosberg in 1946. However, the species is not mentioned in Fosberg's The Vegetation of Micronesia (1960). Stone, in The Flora of Guam (1970), commented on its rarity on Guam and described the tree as "a fine, handsome species worthy of cultivation."

In 2010, Snow & Veldkamp reclassified the species as Syzygium thompsonii (Merr.) N.Snow comb. nov., which is now the accepted species name. These authors also advised that the species should be merged with Syzygium trukense and Syzygium stelechanthum, both from the Caroline Islands. However, in 2012, Costion & Lorence disagreed with the merger, arguing that Syzygium trukense grows on volcanic soils of Chuuk, whereas the specimens on Guam is restricted to the northern limestone forest and has not been found growing in the volcanic soils of southern Guam. They further commented that it would be an unlikely geographical distribution involving only the southern Mariana Islands and Chuuk. The Plants of the World Online database continues to list these 3 species as distinct from each other.

== Gallery ==
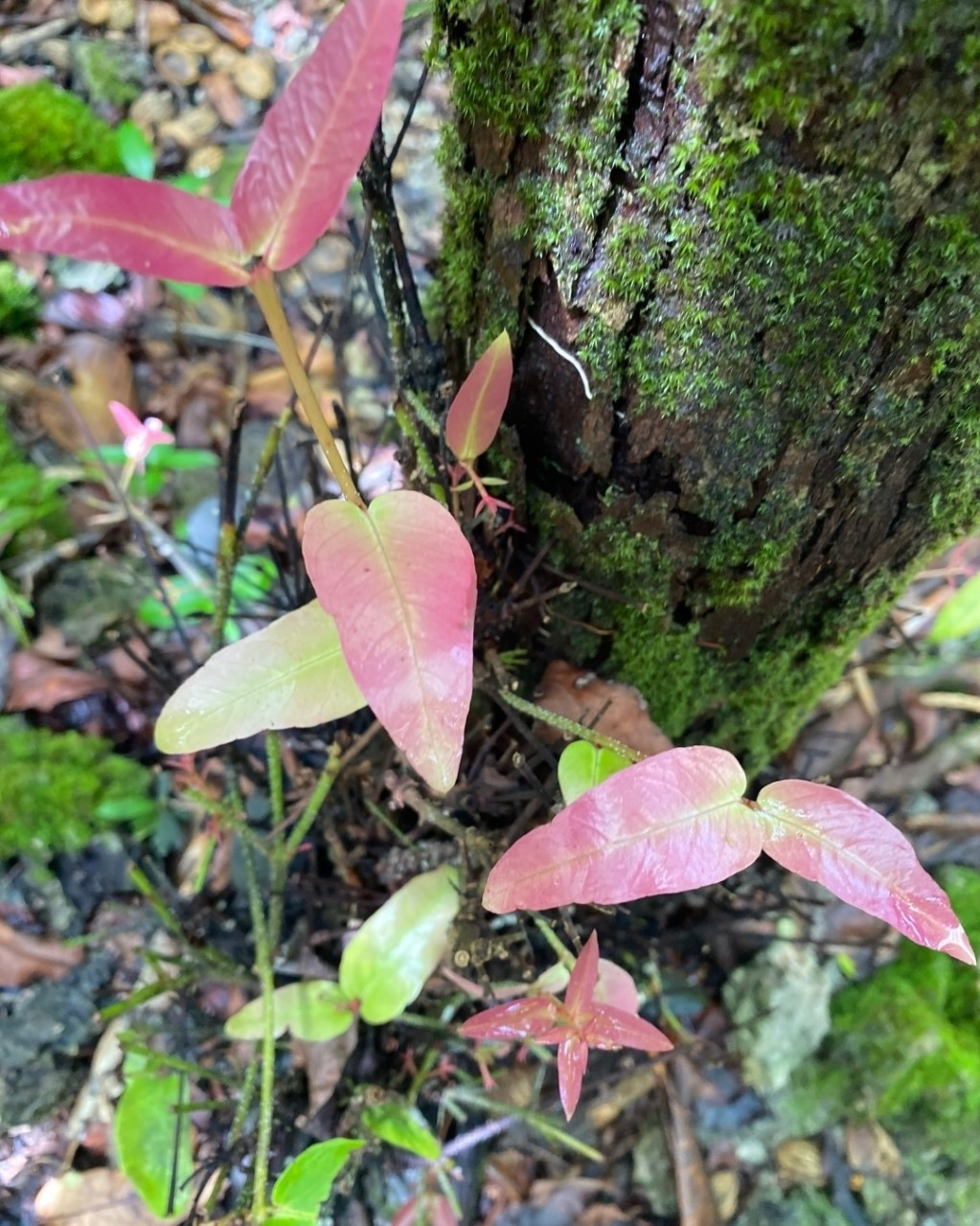
New leaves emerging from base of trunk (Guam)

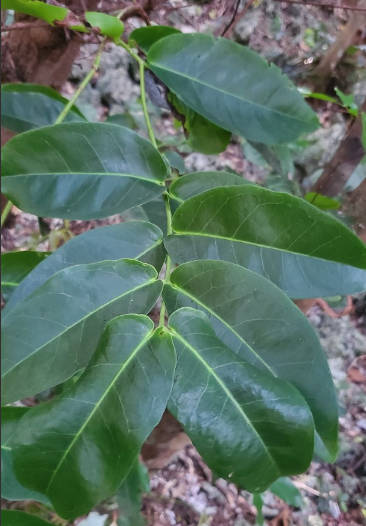
Leaf arrangement (Guam)

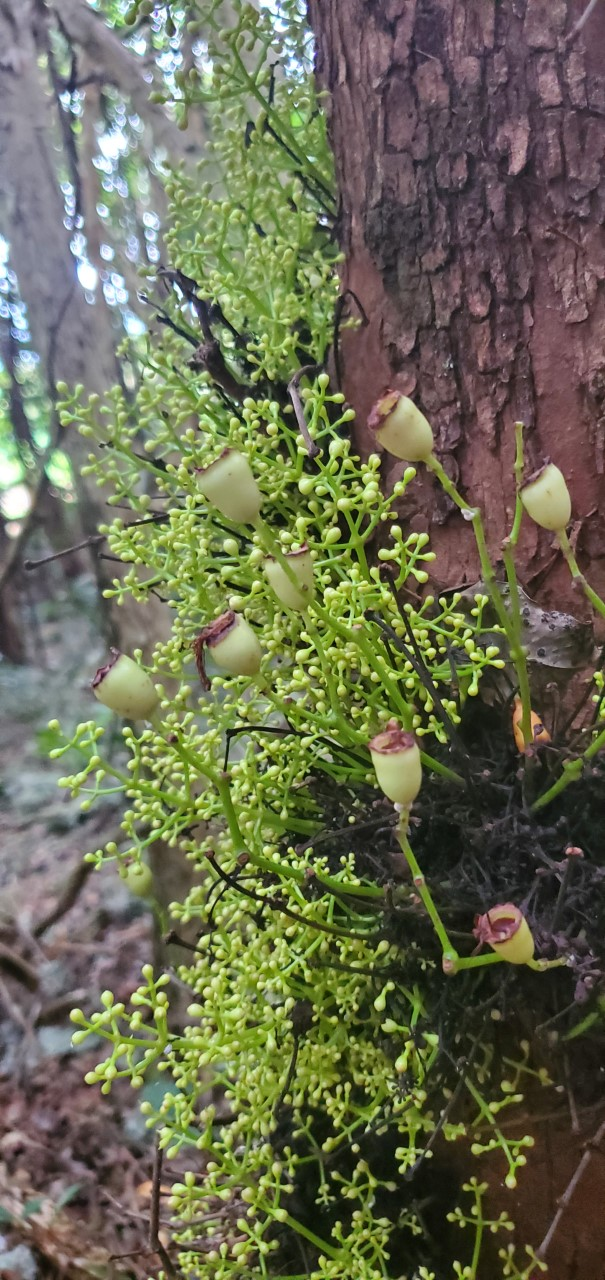
Buds and developing fruits (Guam)

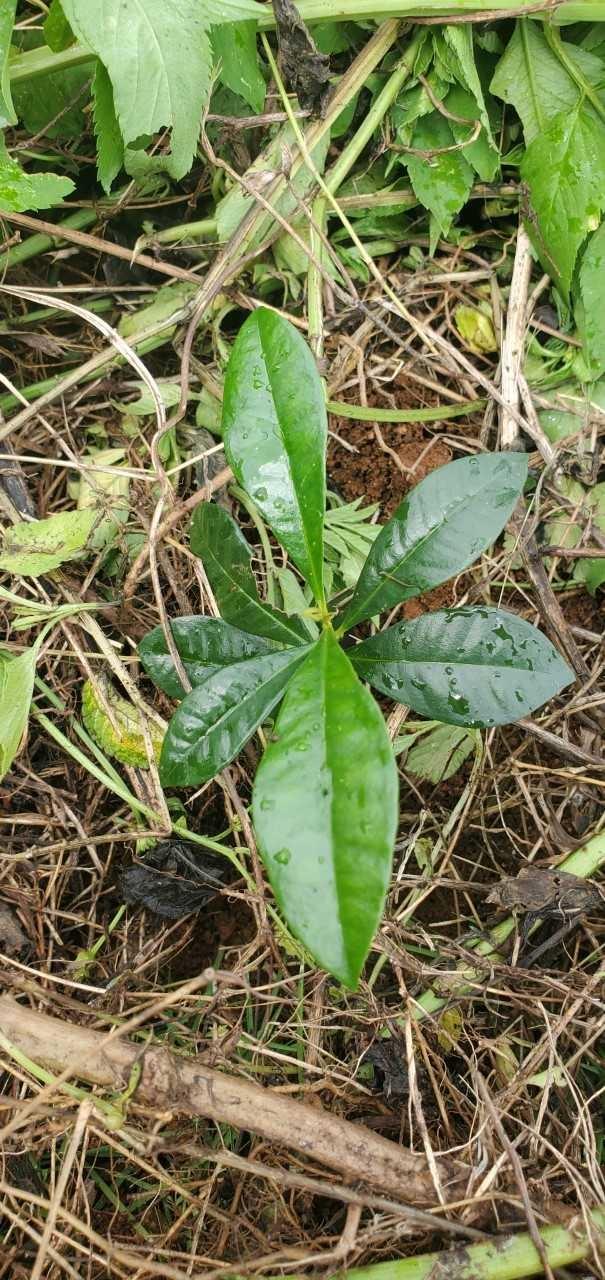
Seedling (Guam)

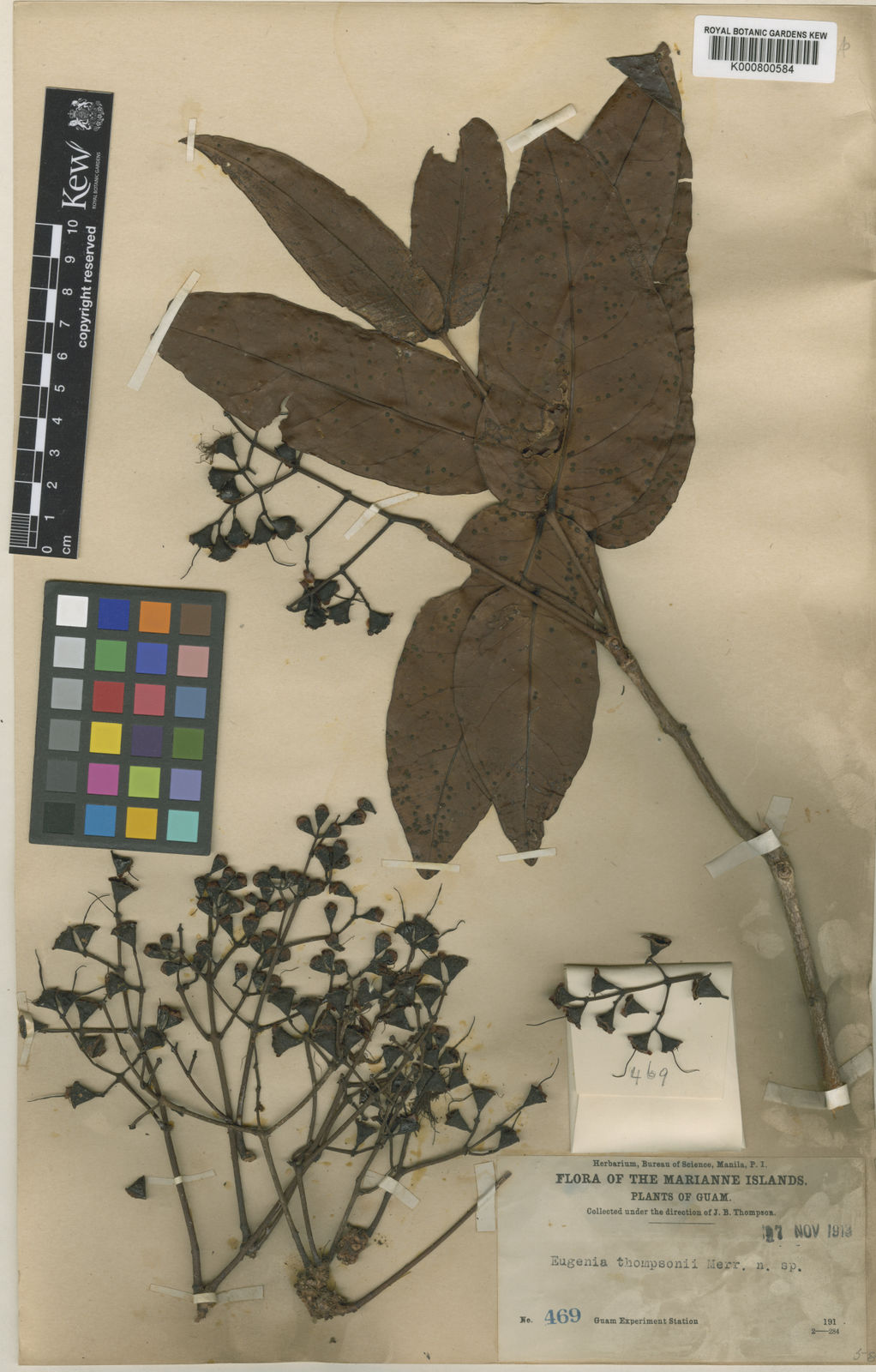
Specimen collected by J.B. Thompson in 1913 on Guam

== See also ==
List of endemic plants in the Mariana Islands
