= Piper salicinum =

Scientific classification
- Kingdom: Plantae
- Clade: Tracheophytes
- Clade: Angiosperms
- Clade: Magnoliids
- Order: Piperales
- Family: Piperaceae
- Genus: Piper
- Species: P. salicinum

Binomial name
- Piper salicinum Opiz

Synonyms
- Artanthe saliunca (Opiz) Miq.; Chavica salicina (Opiz) C.Presl

Species of plant

Piper salicinum (no known common name) is a plant in the Piperaceae family that is possibly endemic to the Mariana Islands (Guam), although there is some confusion in the literature as to whether it may have been collected from Mexico and Panama. It has not been observed since its initial collection in 1792.

== Description ==
Piper salicinum was described in 1828 by the botanist Philipp Maximilian Opiz as having smooth branches that are striated, jointed and knotty; smooth petioles; leaves opposite and lanceolate in shape.

== Distribution and habitat ==
Two herbarium specimens are known to exist, both collected in 1792 by Czech botanist Thaddäus Haenke on the Malaspina Expedition, which had stopped in both Central America and on Guam. One specimen is stored at the herbarium of Charles University in Prague and the other is a fragment housed at the University of Illinois Herbarium.

In the original 1828 description of the species, Czech botanist Carl Borivoj Presl named it Piper salicinum, citing as the authority Philipp Maximillian Opiz, and localized it to Mexico and Panama. In 1844, the Dutch botanist, Miquel, also wrote that the species (which he named Artanthe saliunca), was from Mexico and Panama, but questioned the locality. The following year, Presl revised his assessment, naming the species Chavica salicina, and wrote (in Latin): "changing the place of origin to the Mariana Islands, since it does not occur in Mexico, nor in Panama, as indicated by Opiz." The same is written by Presl on the undated labels of the herbarium specimens.

In 1888, the Costa Rican naturalist, Alfaro, copied the original 1828 Pesl description in localizing Piper salicinum to Mexico and Panama.

Both specimens are catalogued by the herbaria as being from the Northern Mariana Islands, although the Malaspina Expedition was only known to have stopped on Guam, not the northern islands.

No herbarium specimens or identifications are known to have been recorded since 1792, nor is it mentioned in the 1975 review of Micronesian Piper species by Fosberg and Sachet, indicating that the species may be extinct or extremely rare in the Marianas, or else it could be a synonym of an unspecified New World Piper.

== See also ==
List of endemic plants in the Mariana Islands
