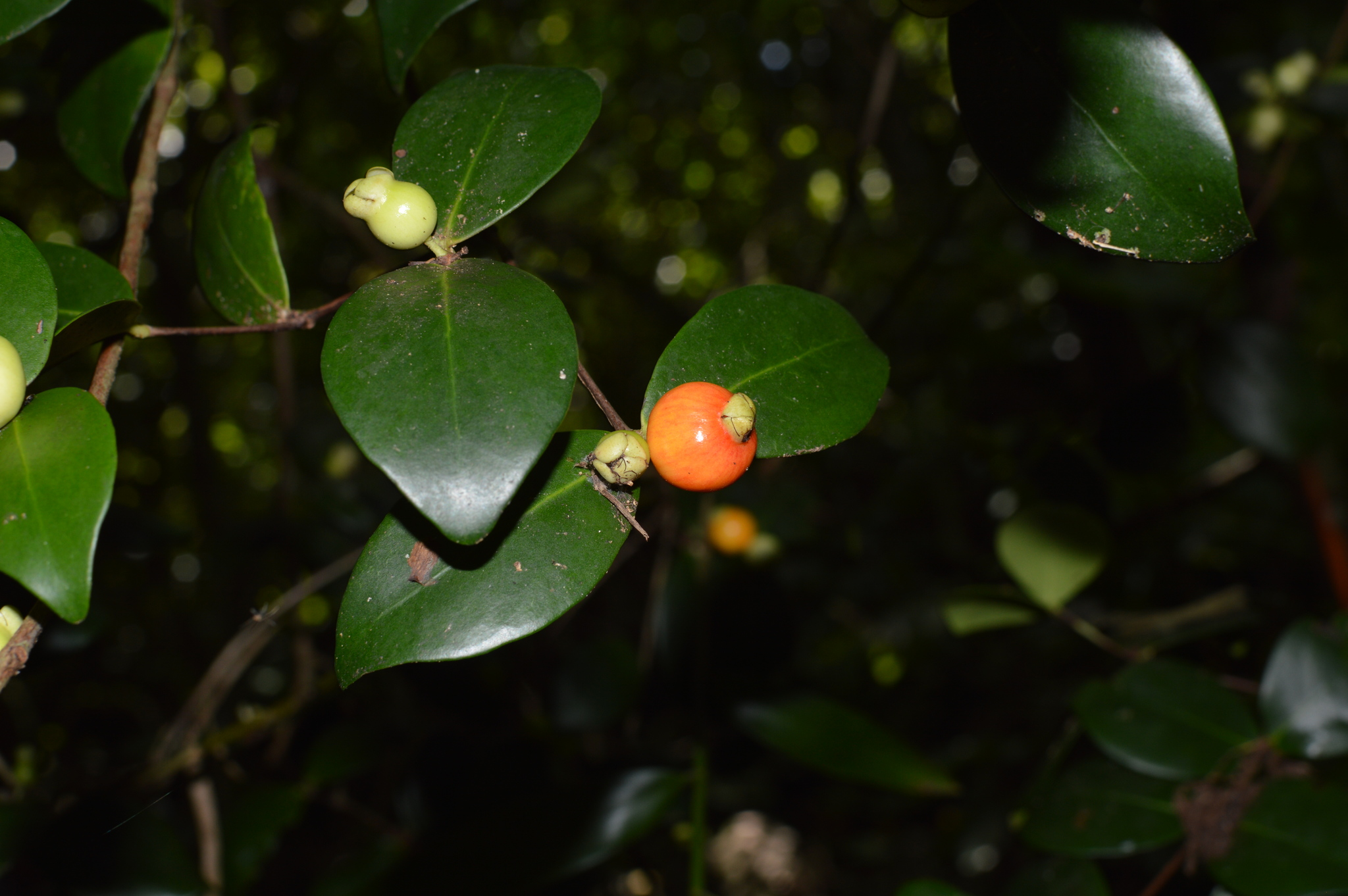
- Leaves and fruits, Saipan, CNMI

Scientific classification
- Kingdom: Plantae
- Clade: Tracheophytes
- Clade: Angiosperms
- Clade: Eudicots
- Clade: Rosids
- Order: Myrtales
- Family: Myrtaceae
- Genus: Eugenia
- Species: E. palumbis

Binomial name
- Eugenia palumbis Merr. (1914)

Synonyms
- Jossinia palumbis (Merr.) Diels (1921)

= Eugenia palumbis =

Agatelang

Species of flowering plant

Eugenia palumbis (Chamorro: agate'lang) is a shrub with edible fruits in the family Myrtaceae. It is endemic to the Mariana Islands, including Guam and the Commonwealth of the Northern Mariana Islands.

== Description ==
Eugenia palumbis is a bush or small tree 5 to 15 feet tall.

Stems and leaves are smooth, except for the younger branchlets and calyces. Branches and twigs are thin and brown.

Leaf petioles are only 3 mm or less. Leaves are somewhat coriaceous and dark green but younger leaves are membranous and reddish or pale green. The underside is punctate with small scattered glands. Leaves are nearly symmetrical, elliptic or ovate-elliptic, 3.5 to 5.5 cm long. The base forms an acute angle, and the apex is obtuse. Leaf margins are slightly recurved. Leaves have about 6 slender and obscure lateral nerves per side, which form subtle loose anastomoses.

Flowers are white. Merrill found the species distinctive because of its "small, axillary, solitary, very shortly pedicelled flowers" not larger than 1 cm in diameter. Pedicelled are stout at about 2 mm diameter. The calyx is papery, glandular, greenish, and funnel-shaped, 3 to 3.5 mm long and 3 mm wide, consisting of 4 oval-shaped lobes. Stamens are indefinite. Filaments are 2 to 3 mm long; anthers 0.7 mm long. Petals are not seen.

Fruits are round, about 6 to 8 mm diameter, orange initially and ripening to bright red. Fruits are edible and sweet tasting.

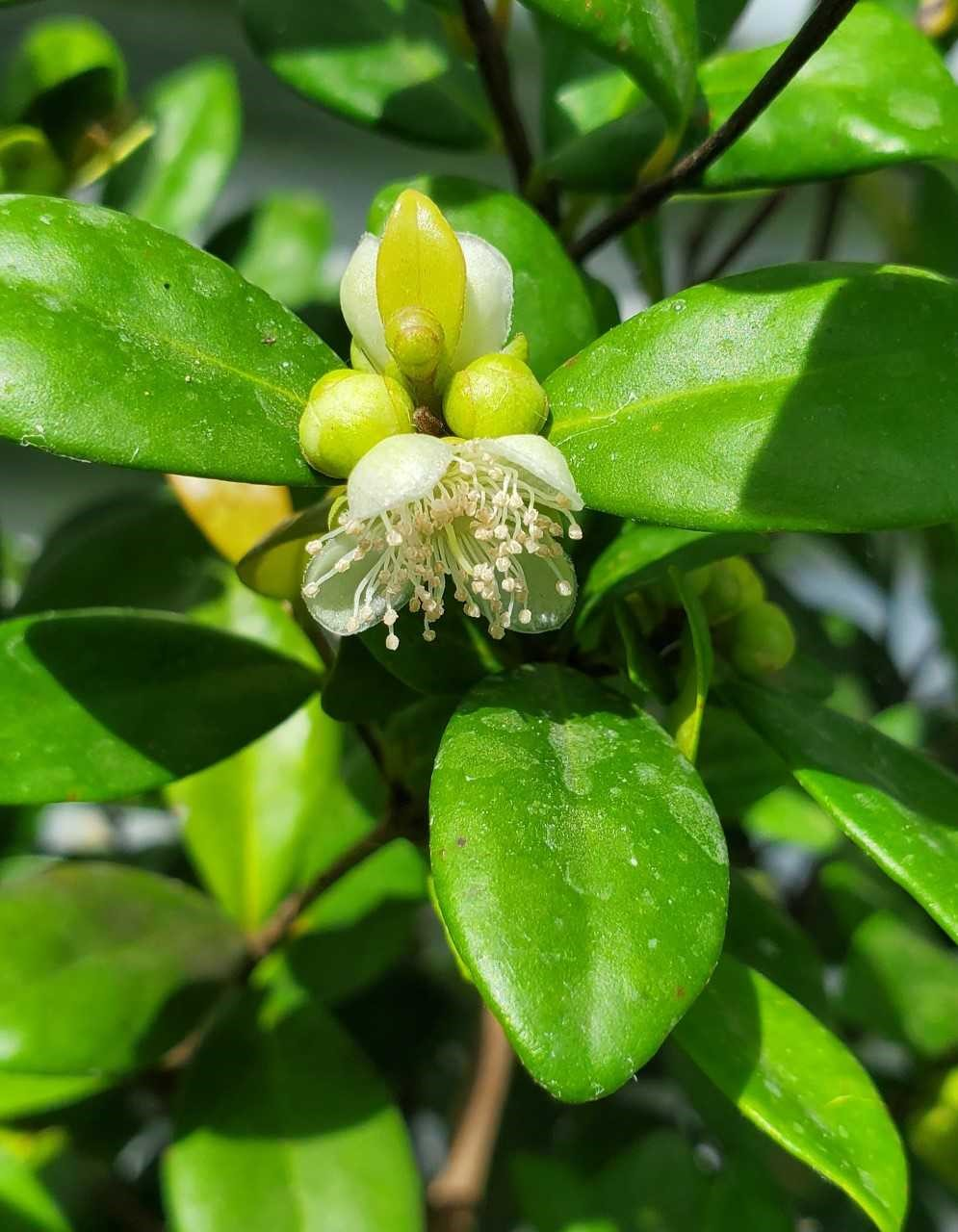
Flower buds

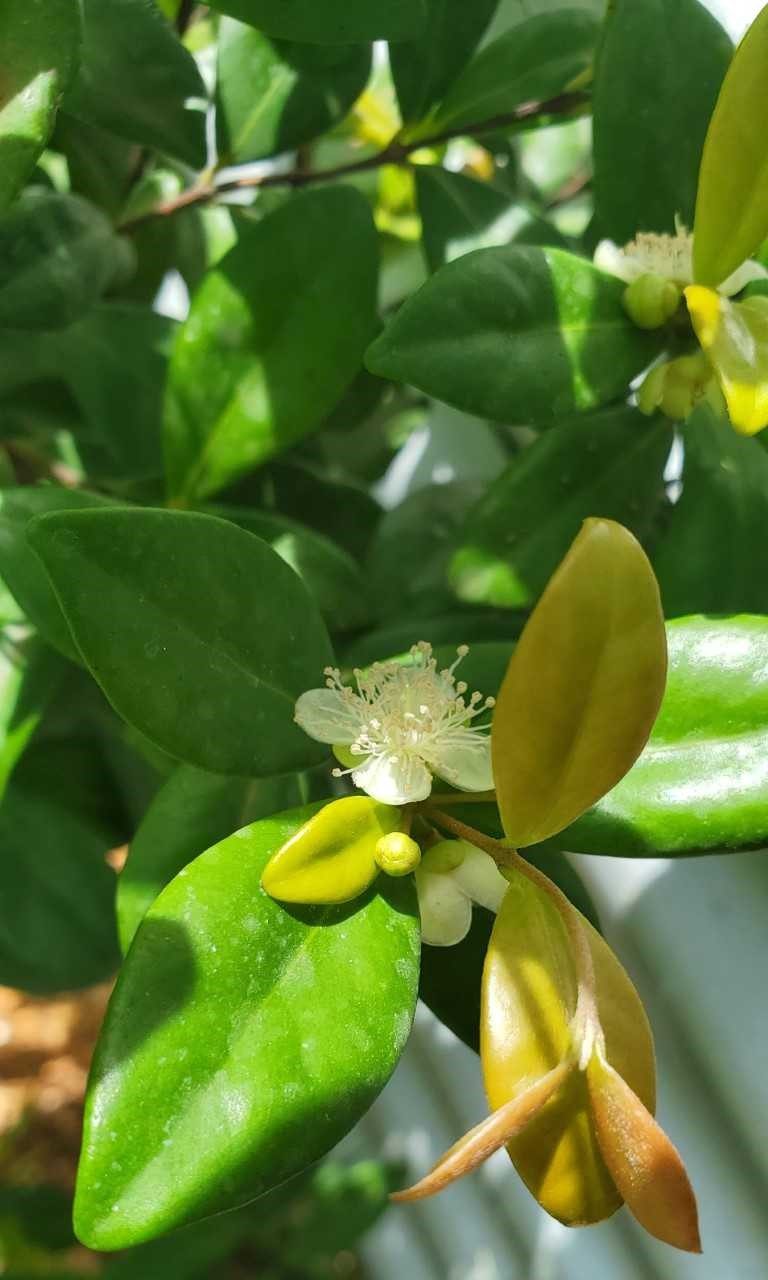
Flowers and emerging leaves

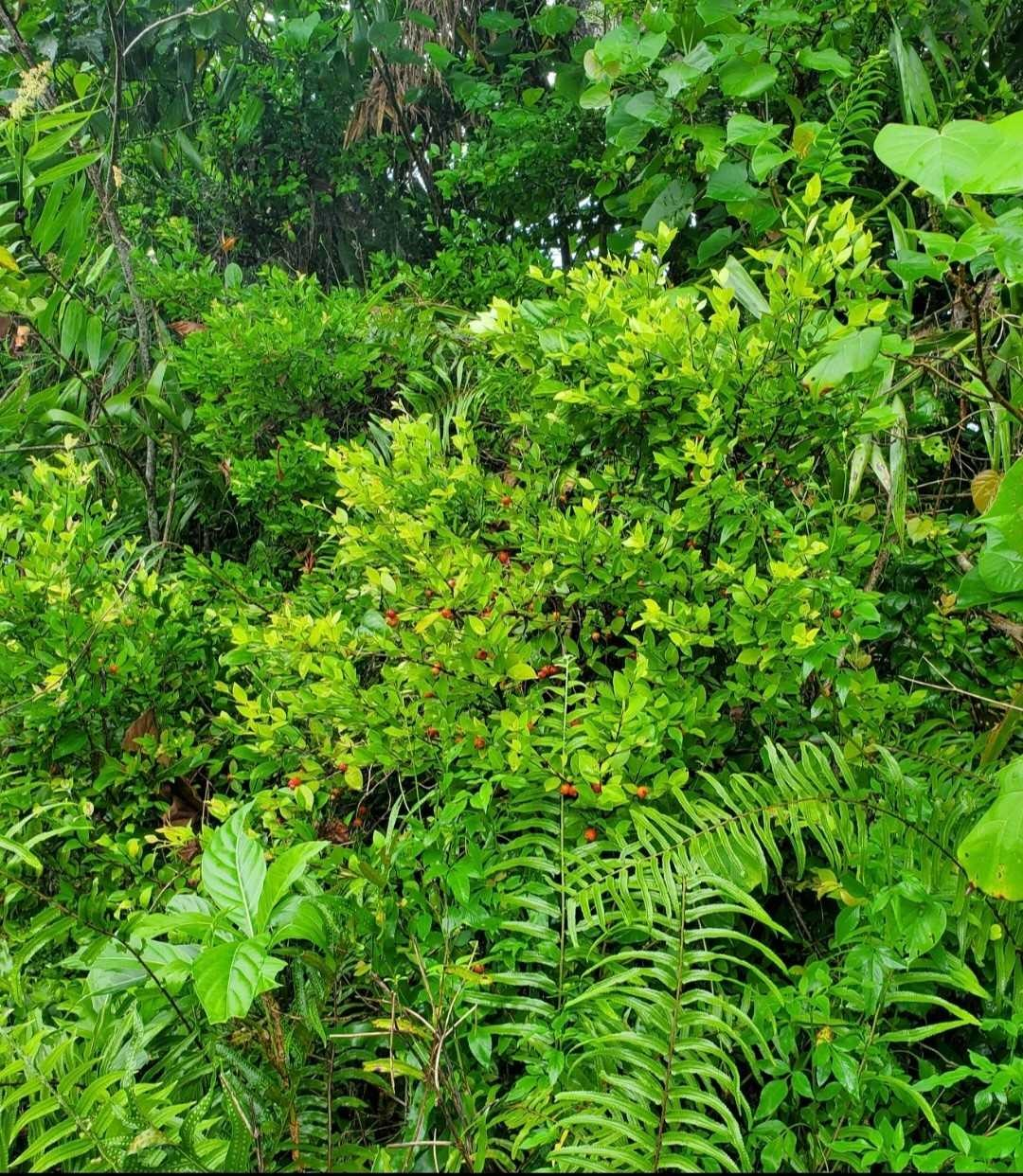
Fruiting bush

== Distribution, habitat, and conservation status ==
The species has been observed on Guam, Rota, Aguiguan, Tinian, Saipan, and Pagan.

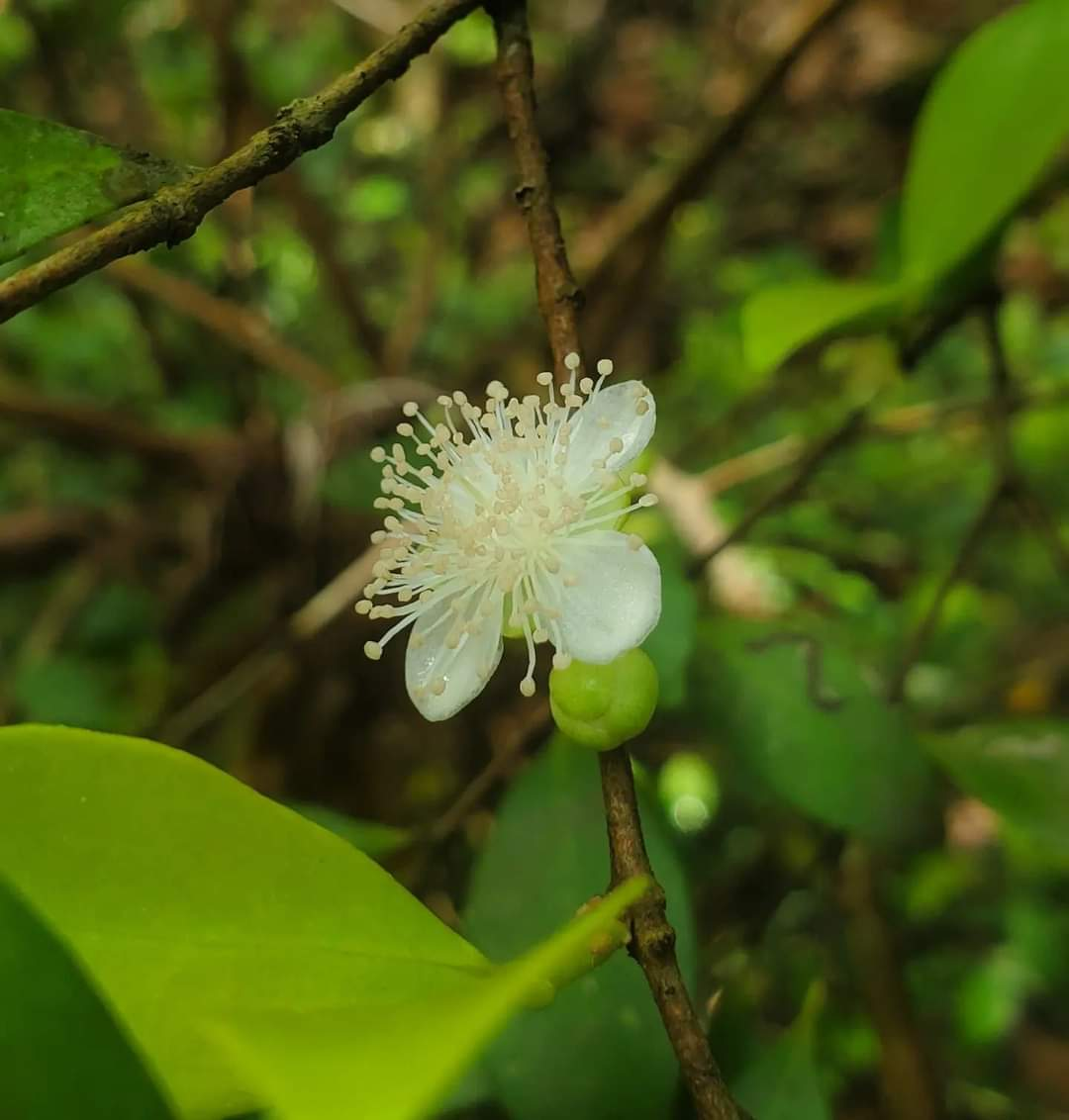
Flower of Eugenia palumbis, Dededo, Guam

It is found on limestone cliffs, sloping limestone terraces, sandy flats, and in primary and secondary limestone forests. On Pagan it has been observed growing from volcanic rocks. It can be found at least as high as 500 feet above sea level.

As of 2023, the species has not been assessed by the IUCN.

== Ecology ==
Eugenia palumbis can serve as a phorophyte of the threatened orchid Tuberolabium guamense.

A review of entomological surveys found no insects reported to be collected from Eugenia palumbis specifically, although two insect species were reported from unspecified Eugenia species on Guam, including a hymenoptera wasp (Euplectrus leucostomus) and a fruit fly (Dacus (Strumeta) ochrosiae).

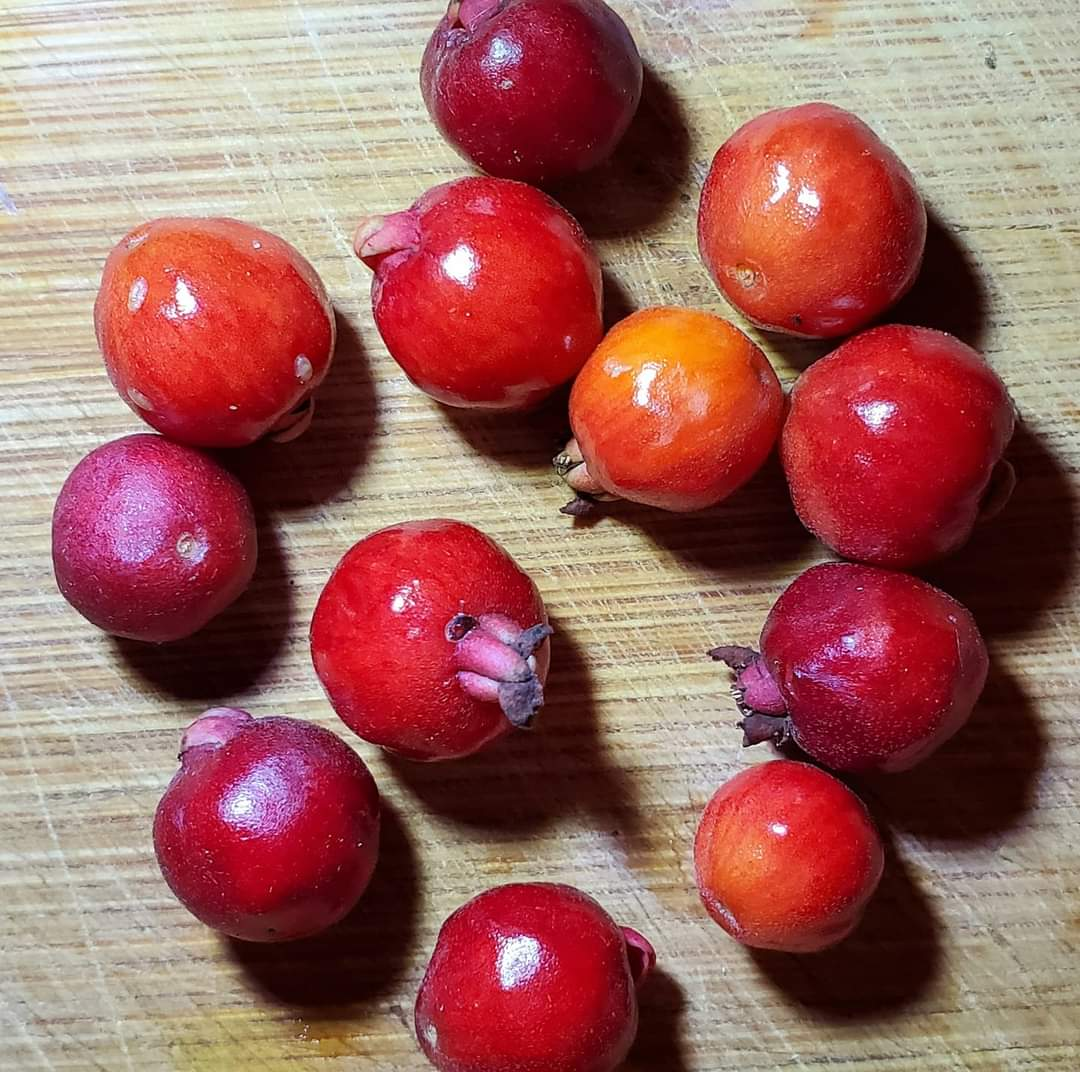
Mature fruits of Eugenia palumbis, Dededo, Guam

== History ==
Gaudichaud in 1826 reported seeing a Eugenia species that went by the names of hadela and agatelon. The former name has not reappeared in the literature since Gaudichaud's report.

The species was first known to be collected in 1906 by German immigrant Hermann L. Costenoble, who would later become Guam's chief forester. In 1914, American botanist Elmer D. Merrill used Costenoble's preserved specimens to name and describe Eugenia palumbis as a new species in the Philippine Journal of Science, as well as recording the indigenous name, agatelang. Merrill named the species after the elderly Padre José Palomo, the first CHamorro Catholic priest who, Merrill acknowledged, had helped the new American administration learn about the island, including providing some botanical material.

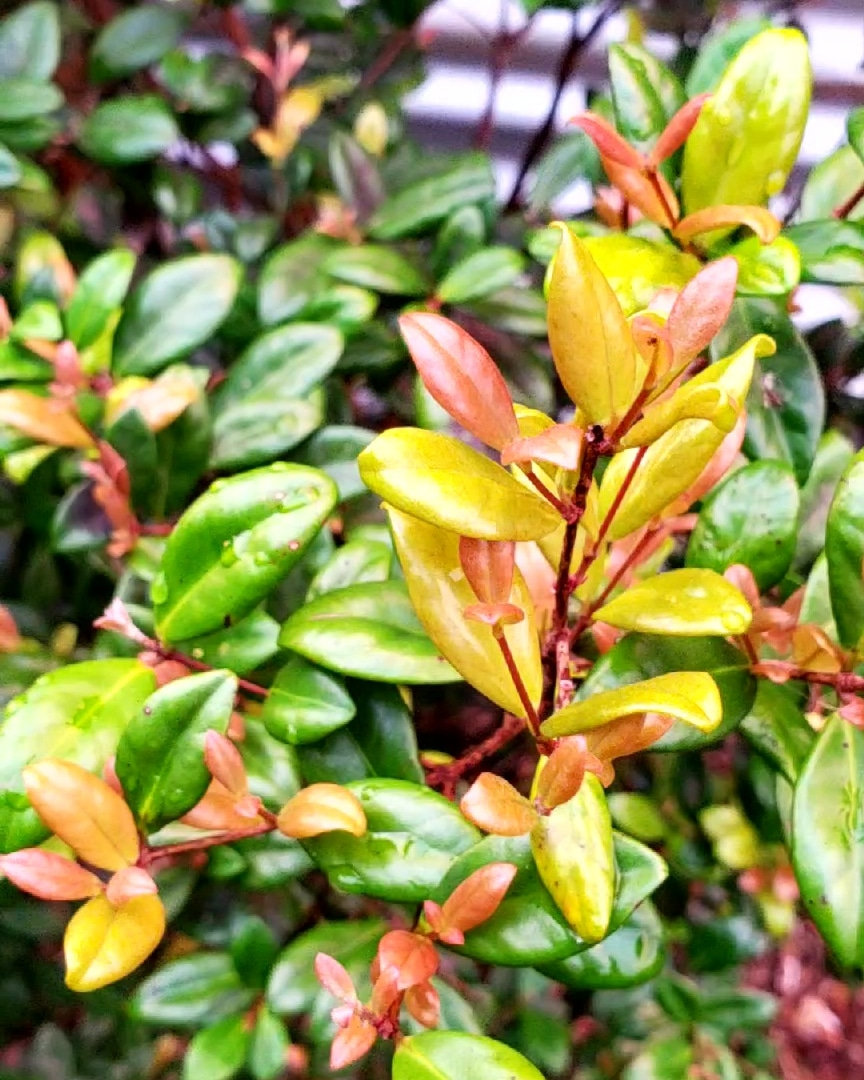
Young leaves of Eugenia palumbis, Dededo, Guam

Safford in 1905 recorded the indigenous CHamorro names agatelang and agatílon, while Fosberg in 1945 spelled it agatelong, and Falanruw in 1990 used agatélang.

The wood is hard and very flexible, and has been used to make axe handles, and booms for ox-carts. Safford in 1905 reported the wood was used in the construction of houses and ranchos, although he admitted he was never able to identify a specimen.

== See also ==
- List of endemic plants in the Mariana Islands
