= Psychotria hombroniana =

Scientific classification
- Kingdom: Plantae
- Clade: Embryophytes
- Clade: Tracheophytes
- Clade: Spermatophytes
- Clade: Angiosperms
- Clade: Eudicots
- Clade: Asterids
- Order: Gentianales
- Family: Rubiaceae
- Genus: Psychotria
- Species: P. hombroniana

Binomial name
- Psychotria hombroniana (Baill.) Fosberg (1955)

Synonyms
- Uragoga hombroniana Baill. (1914); See Distribution and habitat for synonyms of each subspecies

Species of plant

Psychotria hombroniana (Chamorro: aplokating palaon; Chuukese: chimei; Palauan: demedemegur; Pohnpeian: kampaniel) is shrub or tree in the family Rubiaceae that is endemic to the Caroline and Mariana Islands in the northwest Pacific Ocean.

== Distribution and habitat ==
The genus Psychotia is a large group with highly variable traits, and taxonomic classification has been challenging. Eight distinct subspecies of Pychotria hombroniana are now recognized, five in the Caroline Islands and three in the Mariana Islands. Subspecies, their ranges, and their historic synonyms are listed below.

=== Caroline Islands ===
==== Psychotria hombroniana var. canfieldiae Fosberg - Caroline Islands ====
Source:

==== Psychotria hombroniana var. carolinensis (Valeton) - Caroline Islands ====
- Known as kampaniel, kempeniel, or kempenial in Palauan, and chimei in Chuukese)
- Synonyms:
  - Amaracarpus carolinensis Valeton (1930)
  - Amaracarpus carolinensis var. squarrosa Valeton (1930)
  - Amaracarpus heteropoides Valeton (1930)
  - Amaracarpus kraemeri Valeton (1930)
  - Psychotria carolinensis (Valeton) Fosberg (1940)
  - Psychotria hombroniana var. squarrosa (Valeton) Fosberg (1980)

==== Psychotria hombroniana var. hirtella (Valeton) Fosberg - Caroline Islands ====
- Synonyms:
  - Amaracarpus hirtellus Valeton (1930)
  - Amaracarpus macrophyllus Valeton (1930)
  - Psychotria ponapensis Fosberg (1940)

==== Psychotria hombroniana var. kusaiensis (Kaneh.) Fosberg - Kosrae ====
- Synonyms:
  - Amaracarpus kusaiensis Kaneh. (1935)
  - Amaracarpus kanehirae Hosok. (1935)

==== Psychotria hombroniana var. peliliuensis Fosberg - Palau ====
Source:

=== Mariana Islands ===
==== Psychotria hombroniana var. hombroniana - Mariana Islands ====
- Synonym:
  - Amaracarpus rotensis Hosok. (1935)

==== Psychotria hombroniana var. ladronica (Hosok.) Fosberg - Rota ====
- Synonyms:
  - Amaracarpus ladronicus (Hosok.) Hosok. (1935)
  - Psychotria ladronica Hosok. (1935)

==== Psychotria hombroniana var. mariannensis (Kaneh.) Fosberg - Alamagan ====
- Synonym:
  - Amaracarpus mariannensis Kaneh. in Bot. Mag. (Tokyo) 48: 926 (1934)

== Common names ==
The common names for Pyshotria hombroniana vary between the islands:

=== Chamorro ===
- Aplokating palaon

=== Chuukese ===
- chimei

=== Palauan ===
- Demedemegur
- Rtertil

=== Pohnpeian ===
- Kampaniel, ke mpenial, kempeniel, or kempenial (mpen meaning nearby, and ial meaning path)

== See also ==
List of endemic plants in the Mariana Islands
