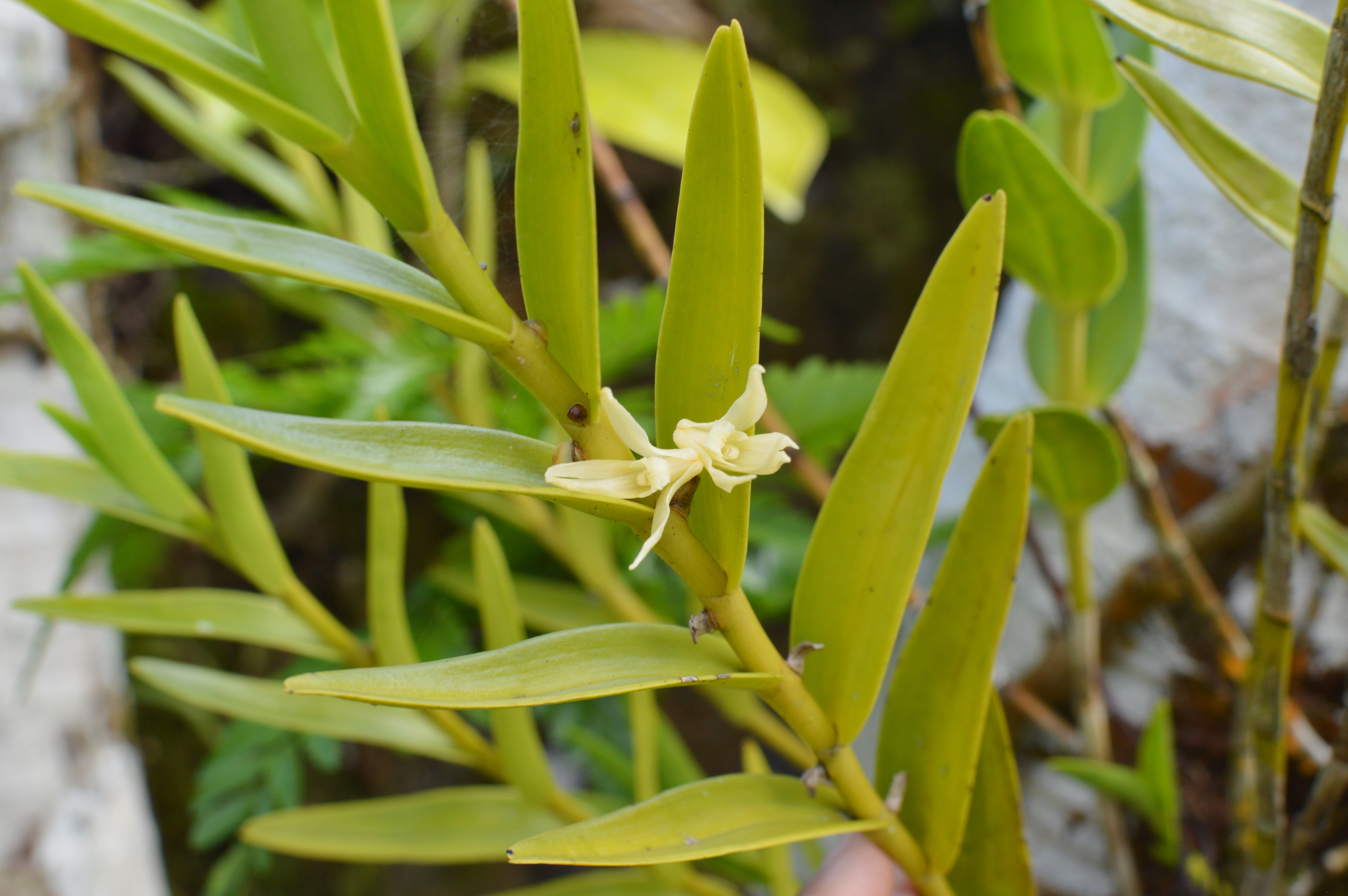
- Dendrobium guamense leaves and flowers, Rota Island, CNMI

Conservation status
- Critically Imperiled (NatureServe)

- Threatened (ESA)

Scientific classification
- Kingdom: Plantae
- Clade: Tracheophytes
- Clade: Angiosperms
- Clade: Monocots
- Order: Asparagales
- Family: Orchidaceae
- Subfamily: Epidendroideae
- Genus: Dendrobium
- Species: D. guamense

Binomial name
- Dendrobium guamense Ames

= Dendrobium guamense =

Species of orchid

Dendrobium guamense is a species of epiphytic orchid endemic to Guam and the Commonwealth of the Northern Mariana Islands. It is currently known from nine occurrences totaling 550 individuals across the islands of Guam, Rota, Tinian, and Saipan.

== See also ==
- List of endemic plants in the Mariana Islands
