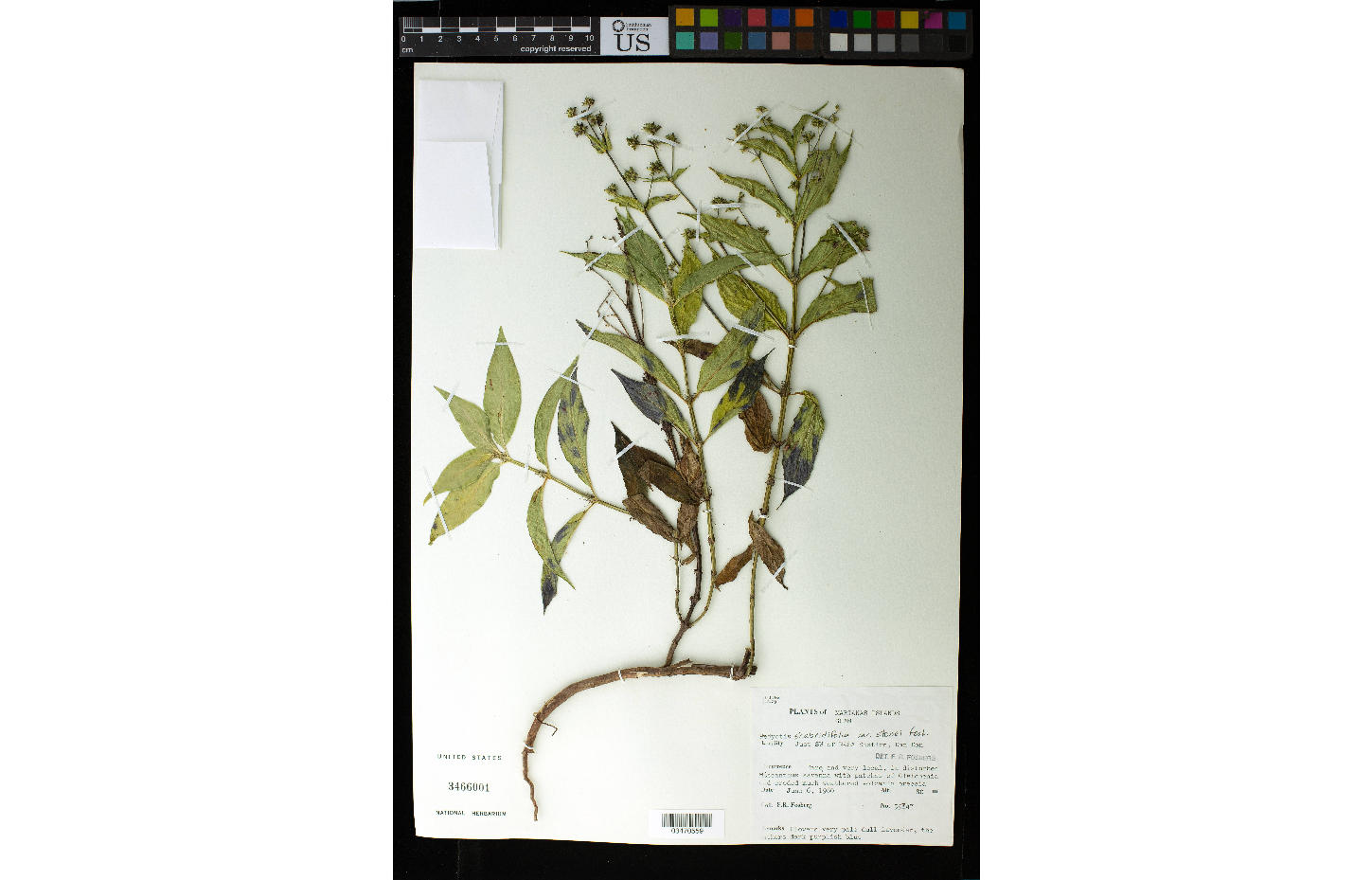
- Hedyotis scabridifolia, var. stonei collected from southern Guam by Fosberg, 1980

Scientific classification
- Kingdom: Plantae
- Clade: Tracheophytes
- Clade: Angiosperms
- Clade: Eudicots
- Clade: Asterids
- Order: Gentianales
- Family: Rubiaceae
- Genus: Hedyotis
- Species: H. scabridifolia

Binomial name
- Hedyotis scabridifolia Kaneh. (1935)

Varieties
- Hedyotis scabridifolia var. scabridifolia; Hedyotis scabridifolia var. stonei (Fosberg)

= Hedyotis scabridifolia =

Herb or small shrub

Hedyotis scabridifolia is an herb or small shrub that is endemic to the volcanic soils of the Mariana Islands of Guam, Rota and Saipan.

== Description ==
The taxonomic key to Micronesian Hedyotis species provided by Fosberg et al. indicates that the distinguishing characteristic of Hedyotis scabridifolia is the "distal branching of thyrses," which are ascending and racemiform. It is similar to Hedyotis laciniata but with inflorescence pattern more similar to H. fruticulosa," and "notable for its long-exserted style."

The variant H. scabridifolia var. scabridifolia (synonym: Hedyotis saipanensis) is endemic to Saipan and distinguished by the whole plant being puberulent (covered in small hairs).

The variant H. scabridifolia var. stonei, found on Guam and Rota in savannas and disturbed sites, is distinguished by its stems and leaves being glabrous, or smooth. It is named after the botanist, Benjamin Stone, who was one of the collectors.

== History ==
Hedyotis scabridifolia was first described in 1935 by Japanese botanist, Ryōzō Kanehira, in the journal Transactions, Natural History Society of Formosa. Fosberg et al. also provided a detailed description of the species in 1993.

H. scabridifolia has been observed on Rota on the trail to the Sabana near the highest point of the island (which is around 500 meters elevation) and on Guam at evevations from 60 to 100 meters near Mt. Lamlam, and the Sagua River, Dan Dan, and Umatac. As of 2024, the latest record of observation of the species was in 2000. There are no known photographs of live plants.

== See also ==
List of endemic plants in the Mariana Islands
