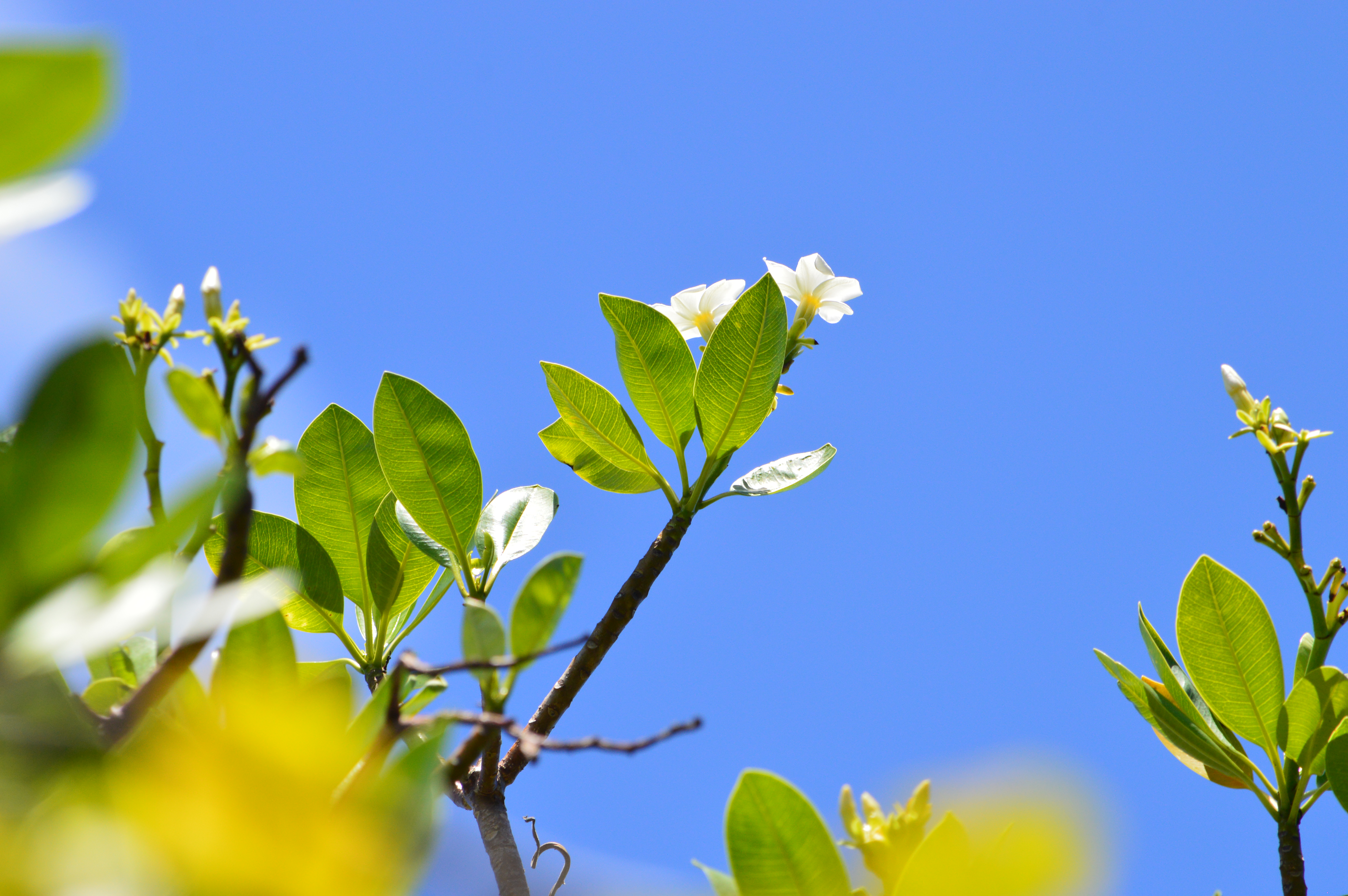
- Cerbera dilatata leaves and flowers

Scientific classification
- Kingdom: Plantae
- Clade: Tracheophytes
- Clade: Angiosperms
- Clade: Eudicots
- Clade: Asterids
- Order: Gentianales
- Family: Apocynaceae
- Genus: Cerbera
- Species: C. dilatata

Binomial name
- Cerbera dilatata Markgr.

= Cerbera dilatata =

Chiute

Species of plant

Cerbera dilatata (Chamorro: chi'ute) was formerly considered to be a distinct species of tree in the family Apocynaceae endemic to the Mariana Islands. However, after a taxonomic reorganization, this species name is considered to be a synonym of the more widespread Cerbera odollam.

== Description ==
This species has dark foliage and hairy flowers that are white and pinkish in the center. Its leaves are crowded near the ends of its branches. It has ovular fruit that are often coupled and speckled green.

== See also ==
List of endemic plants in the Mariana Islands

== Gallery ==
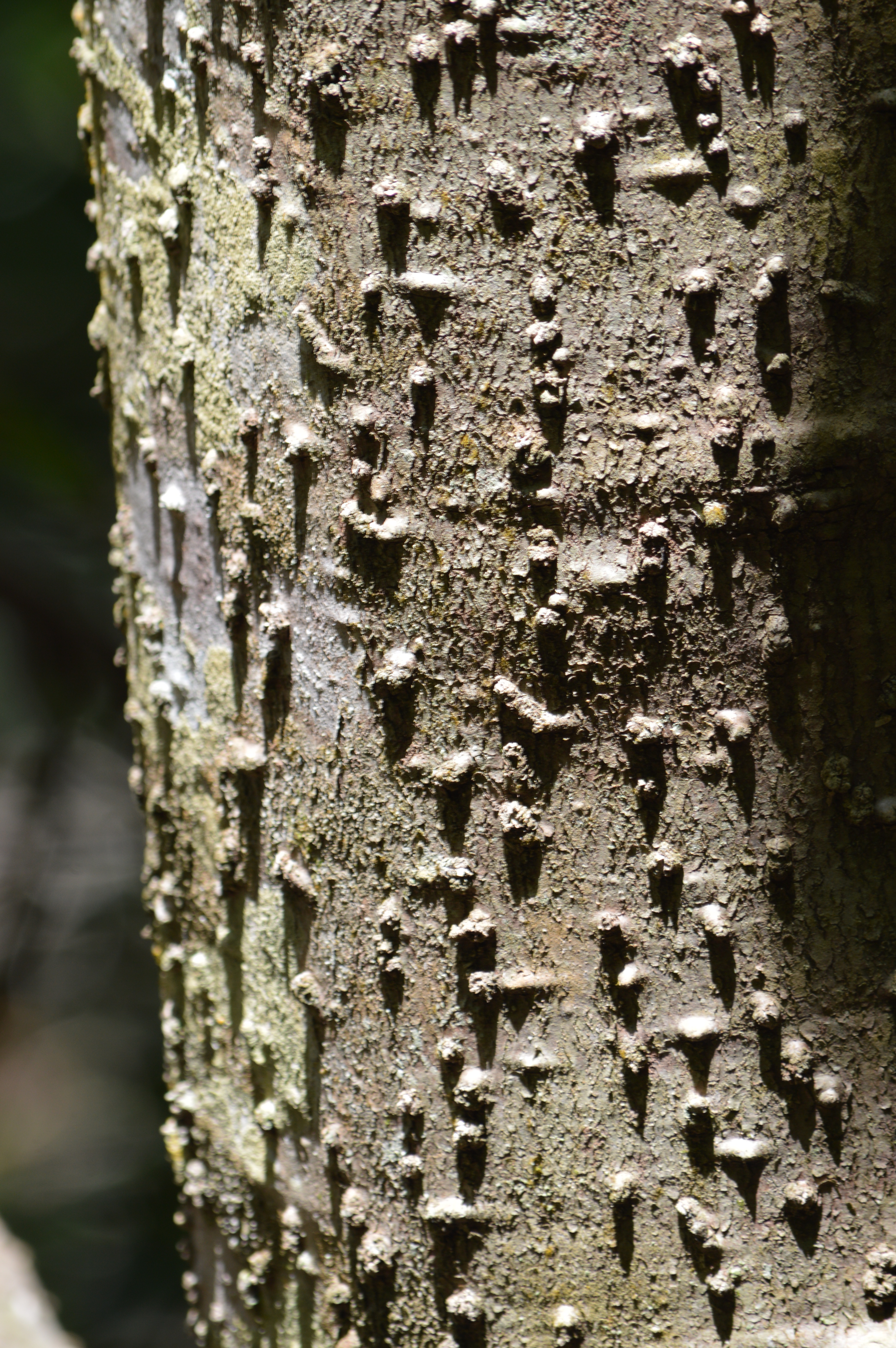
Bark

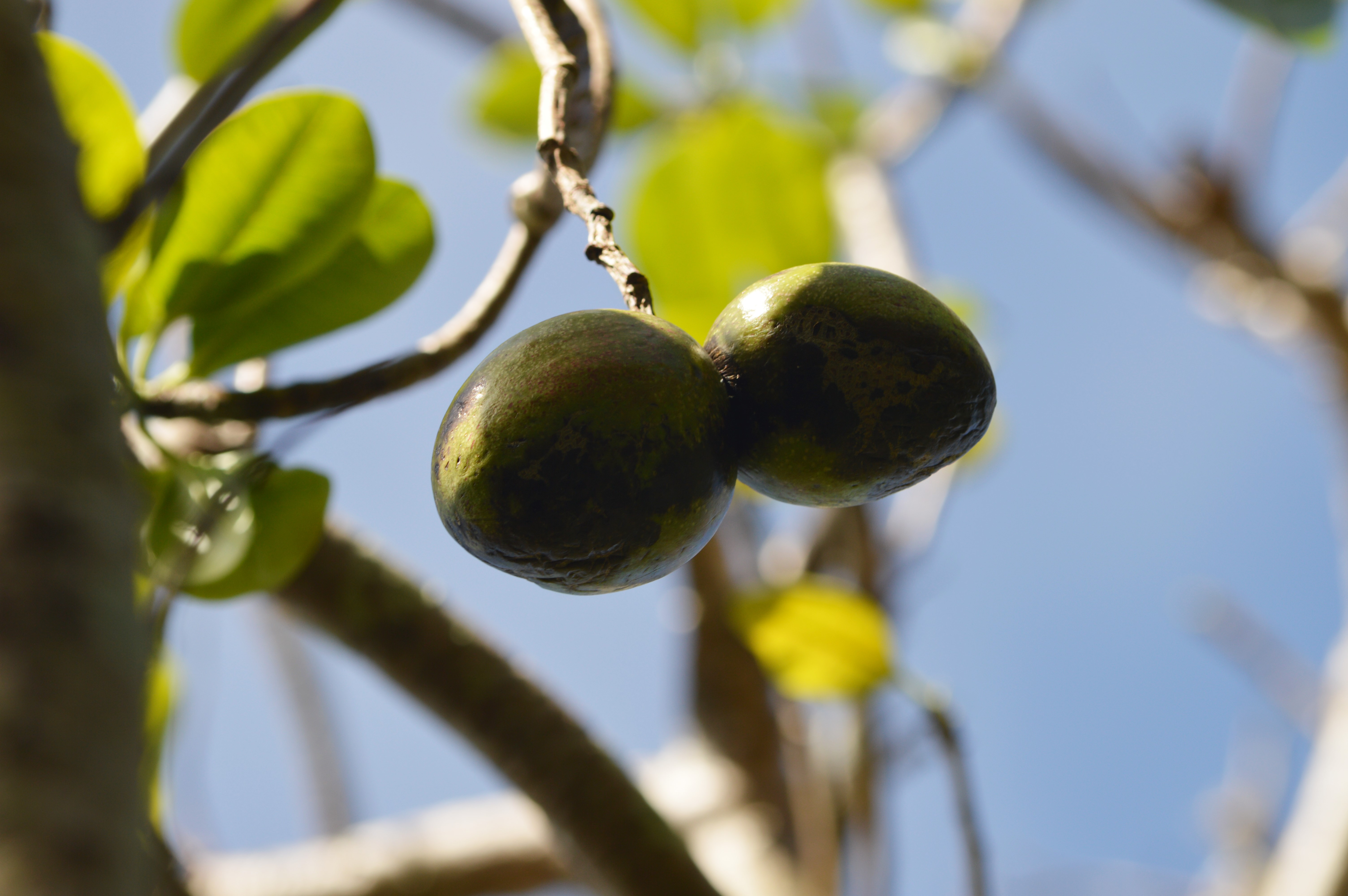
Fruit

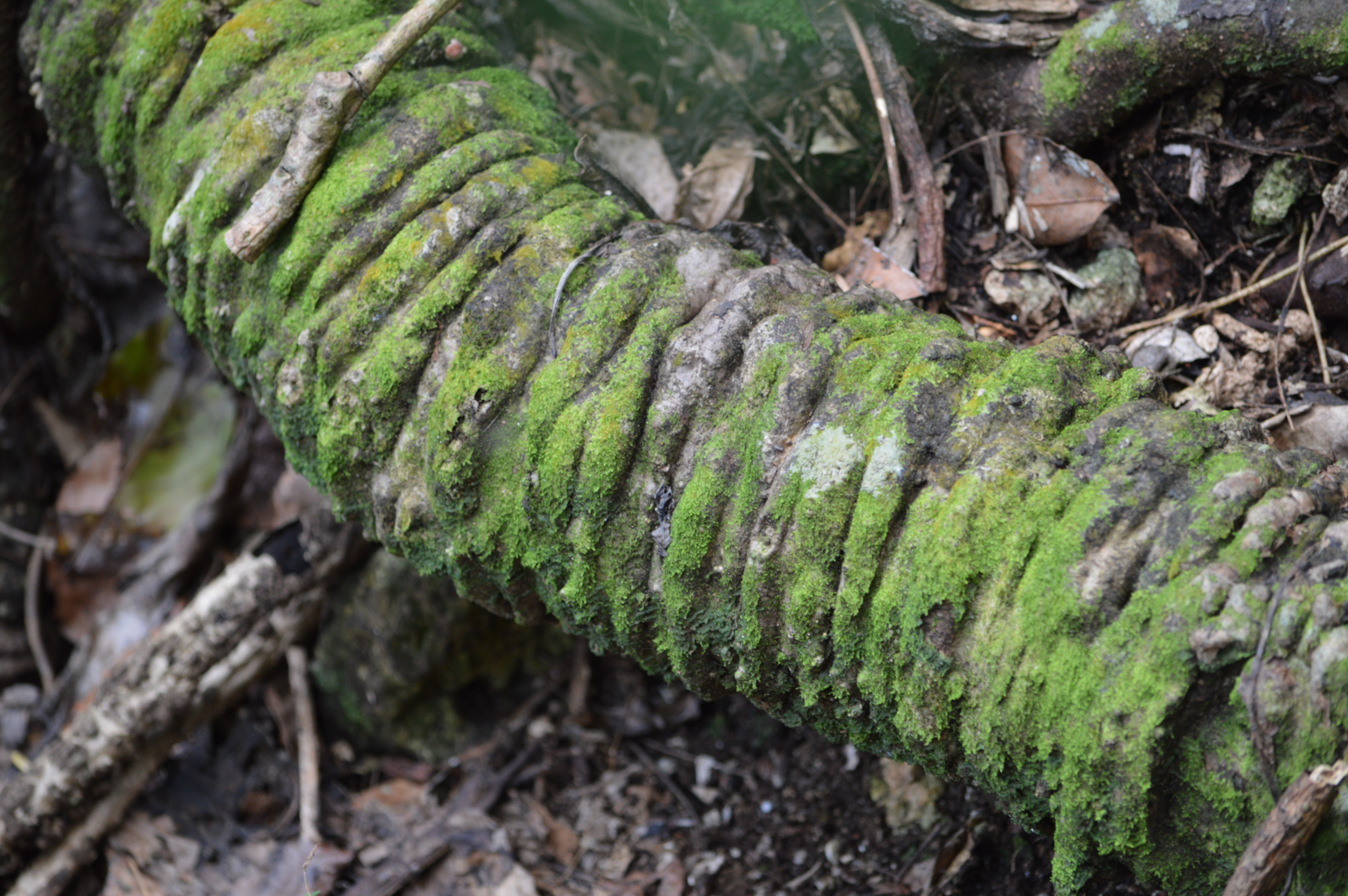
Roots
