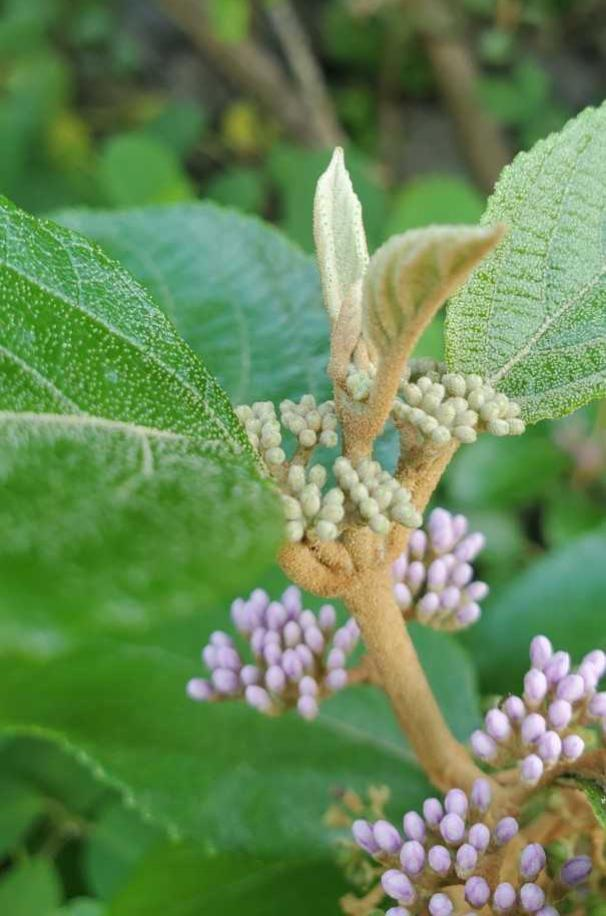

Conservation status
- Least Concern (IUCN 3.1)

Scientific classification
- Kingdom: Plantae
- Clade: Tracheophytes
- Clade: Angiosperms
- Clade: Eudicots
- Clade: Asterids
- Order: Lamiales
- Family: Lamiaceae
- Genus: Callicarpa
- Species: C. candicans

Binomial name
- Callicarpa candicans (Burm.f.) Hochr. (1934)

Synonyms
- Urtica candicans Burm.f. (1768)

= Callicarpa candicans =

Malayan Lilac

Species of flowering plant

Callicarpa candicans, or the malayan lilac, is a species of flowering plant in the mint family. It is native Indochina, southern China, Malesia, New Guinea, northern Australia, and Micronesia.

Several infraspecific taxa are accepted:

- Callicarpa candicans var. candicans (Burm.f.) Hochr. – southeastern China, Indochina, Malesia, New Guinea, and northern Australia
- Callicarpa candicans f. glabriuscula (H.J.Lam) Fosberg – western Caroline Islands
- Callicarpa candicans var. integrifolia (H.J.Lam) Fosberg – Caroline Islands
- Callicarpa candicans var. paucinervia (Merr.) Fosberg – Marianas (Chamorro: hamlag)
- Callicarpa candicans var. ponapensis Fosberg – Caroline Islands (Pohnpei)

== Gallery ==
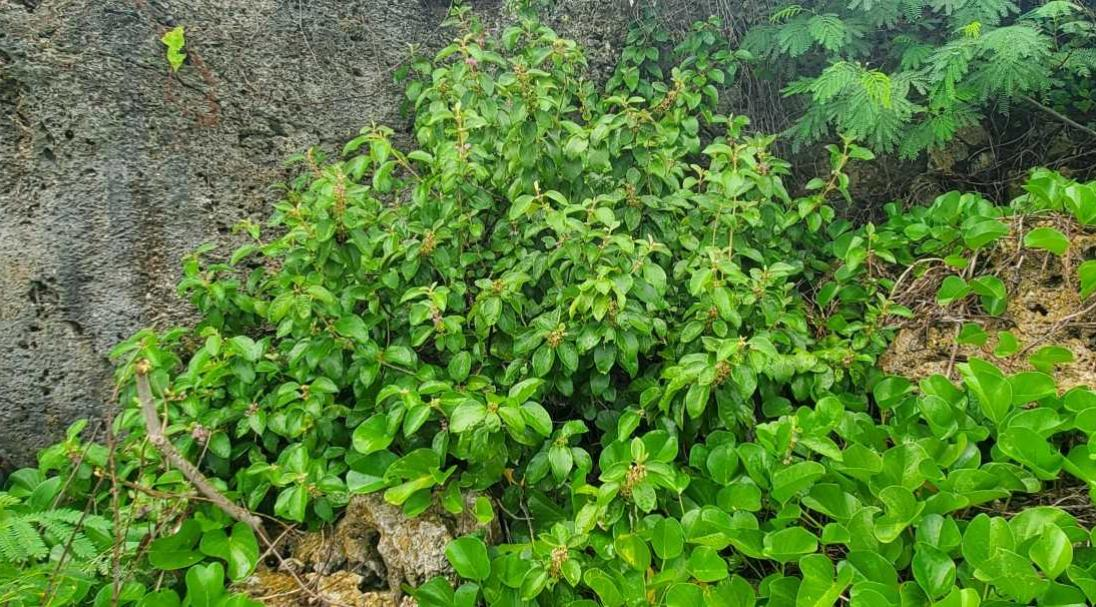
Callicarpa candicans (paucinervia variant) bush growing from sea-exposed limestone. Tamuning, Guam

== See also ==
- List of endemic plants in the Mariana Islands
