= Tabernaemontana rotensis =

Conservation status
- Threatened (ESA)

Scientific classification
- Kingdom: Plantae
- Clade: Tracheophytes
- Clade: Angiosperms
- Clade: Eudicots
- Clade: Asterids
- Order: Gentianales
- Family: Apocynaceae
- Genus: Tabernaemontana
- Species: T. rotensis

Binomial name
- Tabernaemontana rotensis (Kaneh.) B.C.Stone

Synonyms
- Ervatamia rotensis

Species of tree endemic to the Mariana Islands

Tabernaemontana rotensis is a species of endangered tree in the dogbane family (Apocynaceae). It is endemic to the Mariana Islands of Guam and Rota, where it grows as a medium-sized tree in native karst forests in shade or full sun.
