= Callicarpa lanata =

Callicarpa lanata is a scientific name which may refer to two different plants

- Callicarpa lanata Gamble is a synonym of Callicarpa vestita
- Callicarpa lanata L. is an illegitimate name for Callicarpa tomentosa
