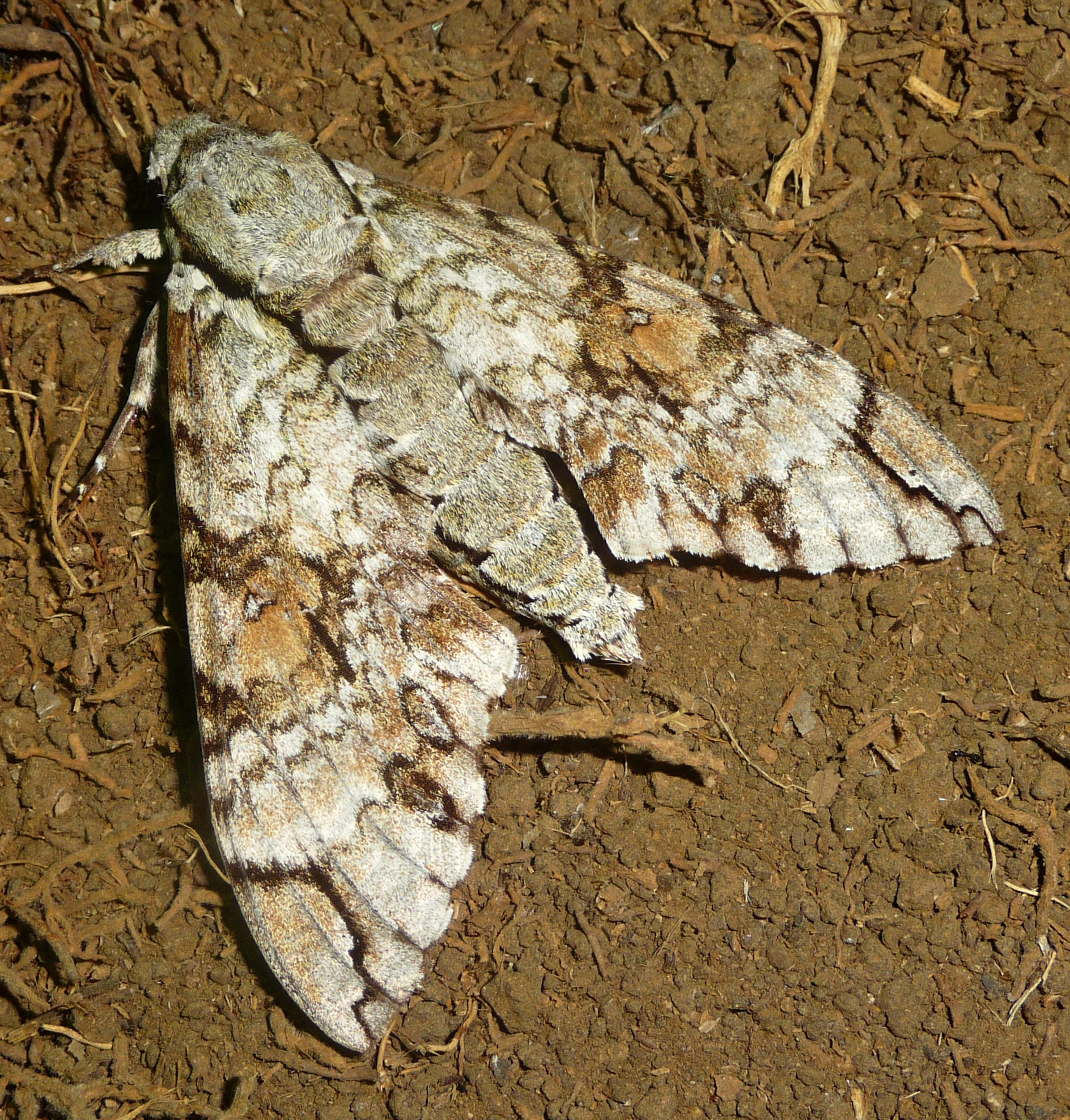

Conservation status
- Secure (NatureServe)

Scientific classification
- Kingdom: Animalia
- Phylum: Arthropoda
- Clade: Pancrustacea
- Class: Insecta
- Order: Lepidoptera
- Family: Sphingidae
- Genus: Manduca
- Species: M. florestan

Binomial name
- Manduca florestan (Stoll, 1782)

Synonyms
- Sphinx florestan Stoll, 1782; Protoparce maricina Schaus, 1941; Diludia brevimargo Butler, 1875; Protoparce florestan vogli Daniel, 1949; Protoparce florestan cabnal Schaus, 1932; Protoparce florestan argentinica Daniel, 1949

= Manduca florestan =

Florestan sphinx

Species of moth

Manduca florestan, the Florestan sphinx, is a moth of the family Sphingidae. The species was first described by Caspar Stoll in 1782.

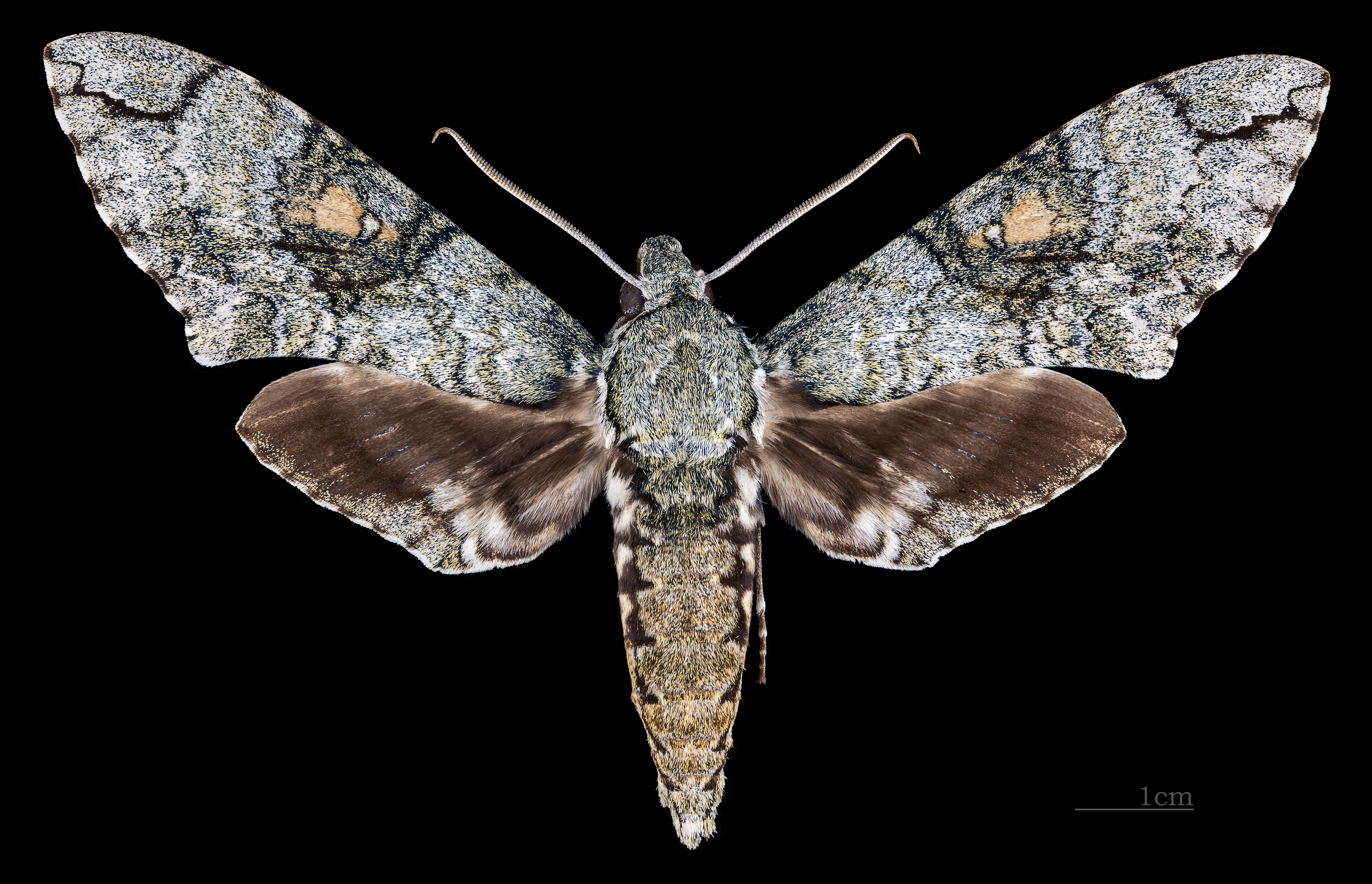
Male, dorsal view

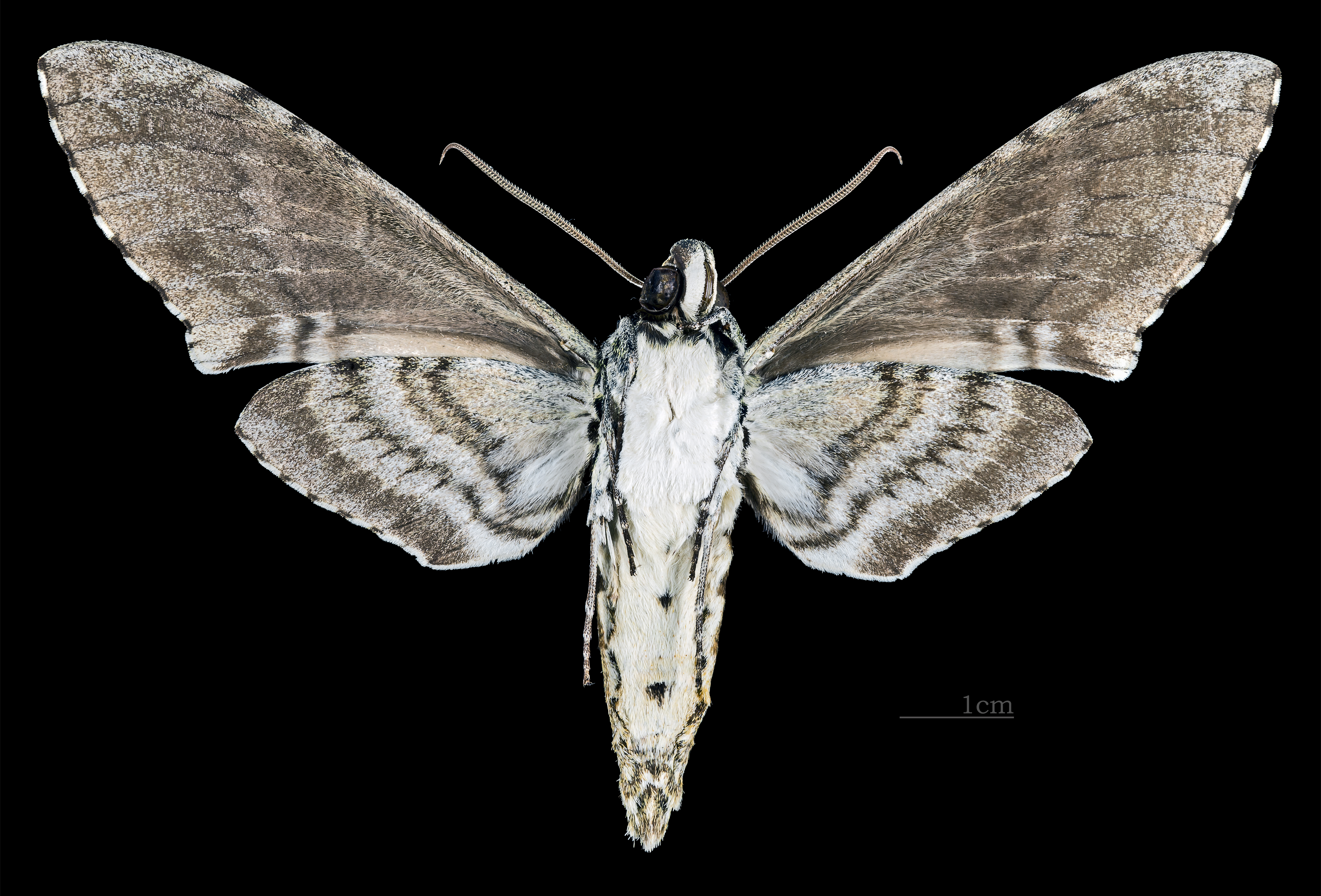
Male, ventral view

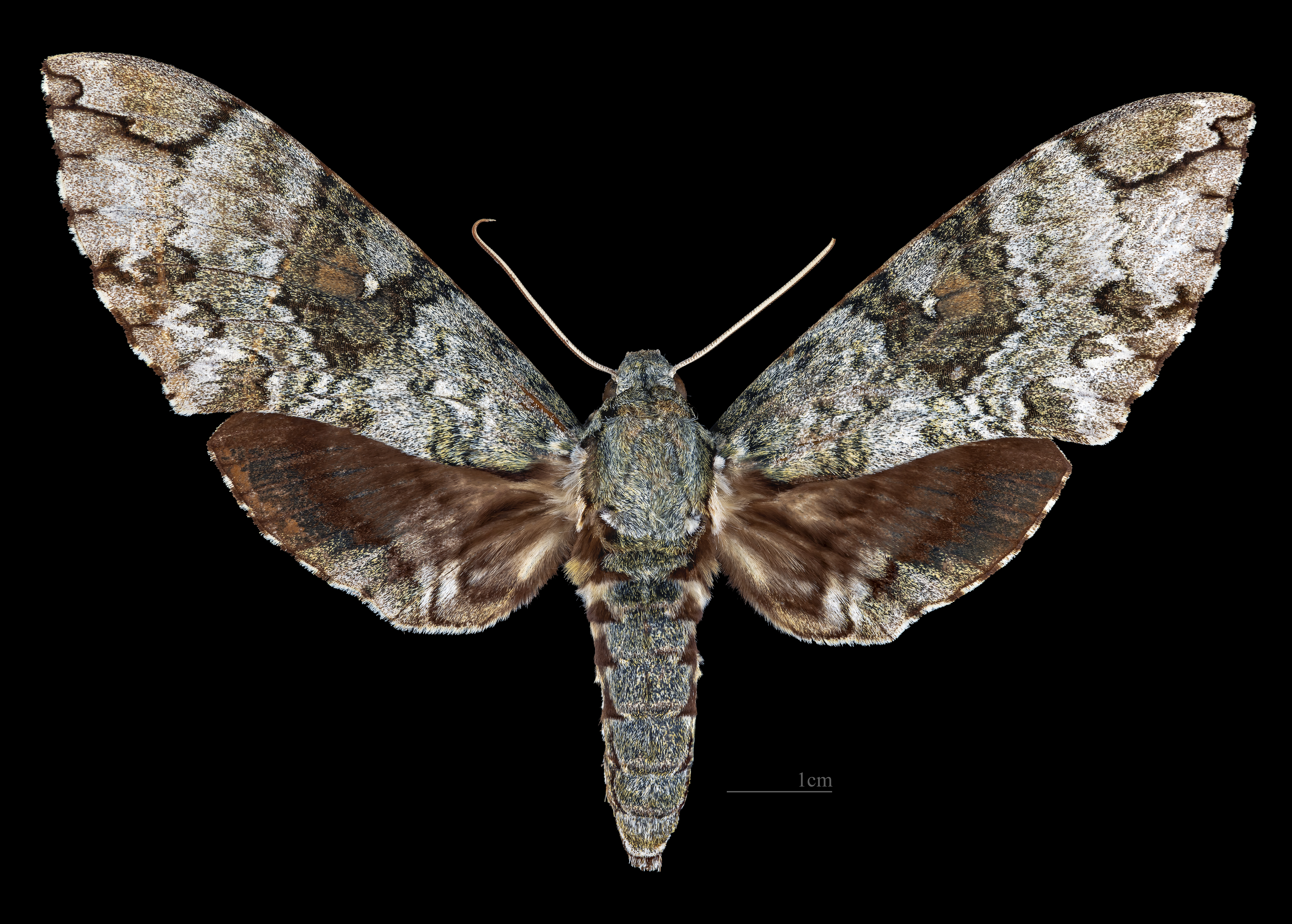
Female, dorsal

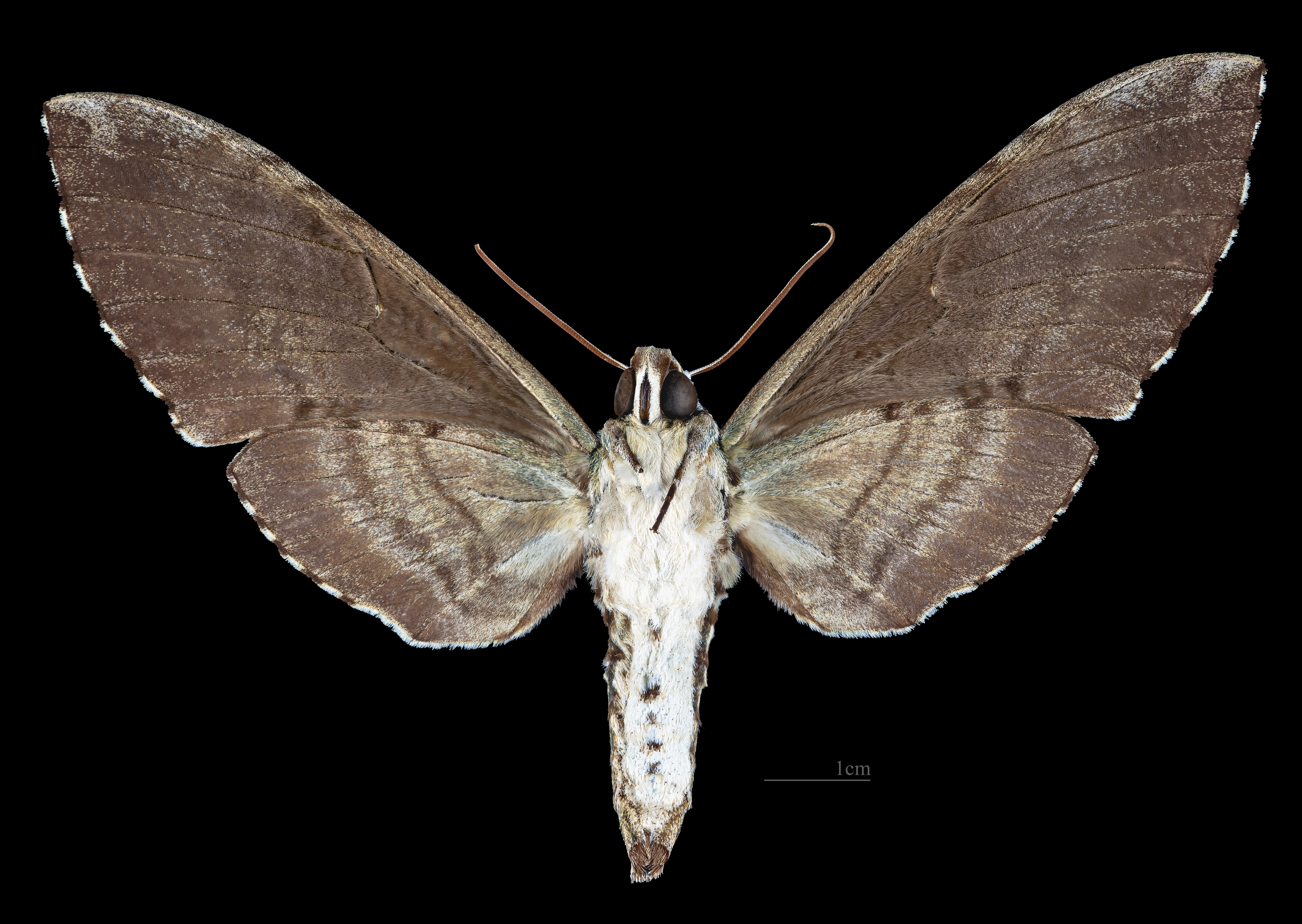
Female ventral

== Distribution ==
It is found from the mountains of southern Arizona, New Mexico, and the lower Rio Grande Valley of southern Texas through Mexico, Belize, Guatemala, Nicaragua, Costa Rica and the rest of Central America south into South America at least to Paraguay, Bolivia, Venezuela, Argentina, Brazil and Suriname.

== Description ==
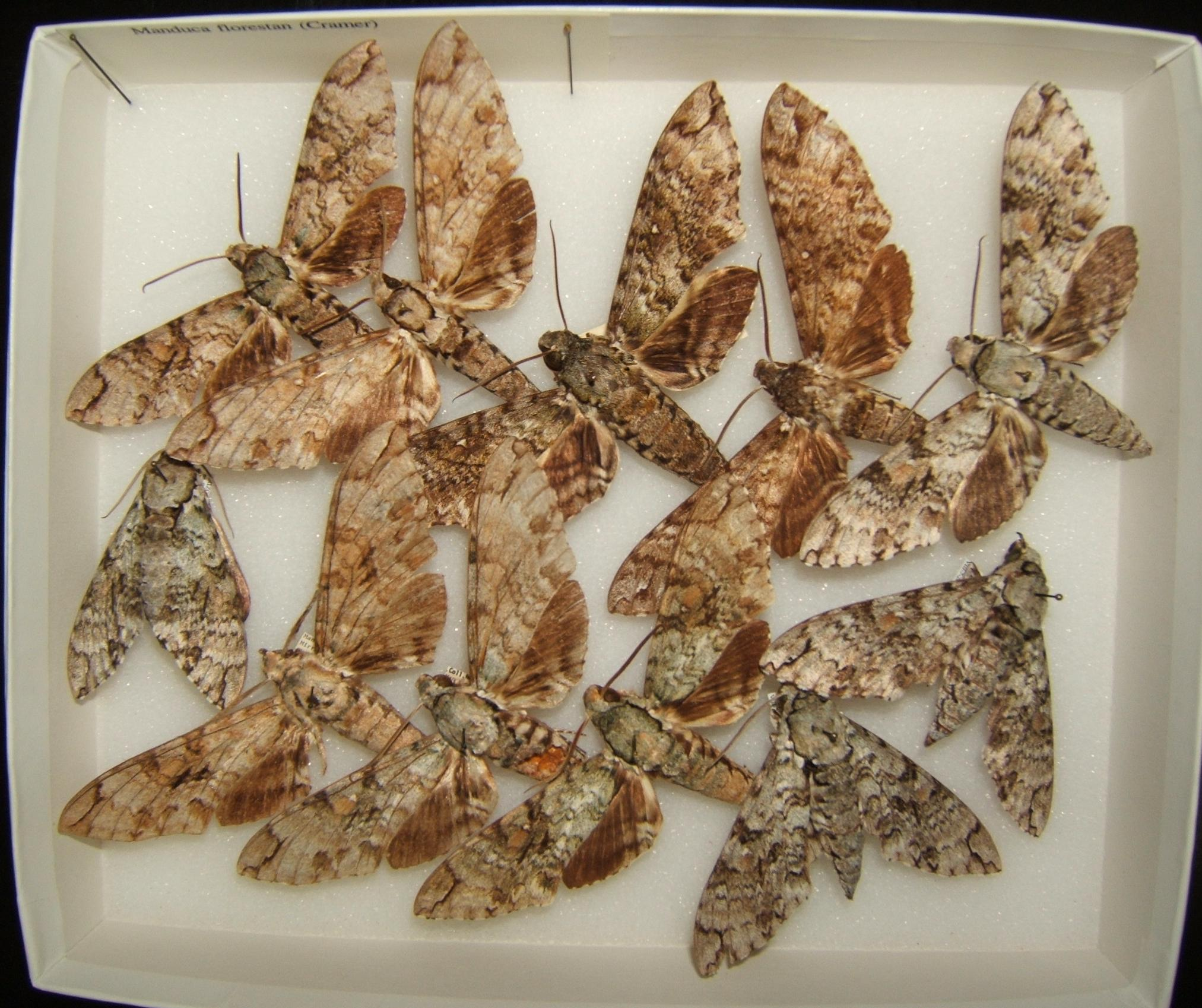
A variation

The wingspan is 99–110 mm.

== Biology ==
There is one generation with adults on wing from late June to early August in the United States. In Bolivia, adults have been reported in March and again from October to December, while adults are on wing year round in Costa Rica. They feed on the nectar of various flowers, including Plumeria rubra in Costa Rica.

The larvae feed on Tecoma and Citharexylum species, Stachytarpheta frantzii, Callicarpa acuminata, Aegiphylla martinicensis, Citharexylum costaricensis, Tabebuia ochracea, Callichlamys latifolia, Cydista heterophylla, Cydista diversifolia, Crescentia alata, Macfadyena unguis-cati, Cordia panamensis, Cordia alliodora and Chionentis panamensis. In Brazil, larvae have been reported on Lantana camara, Pyrostegia venusta and Vitex megapotamica.
