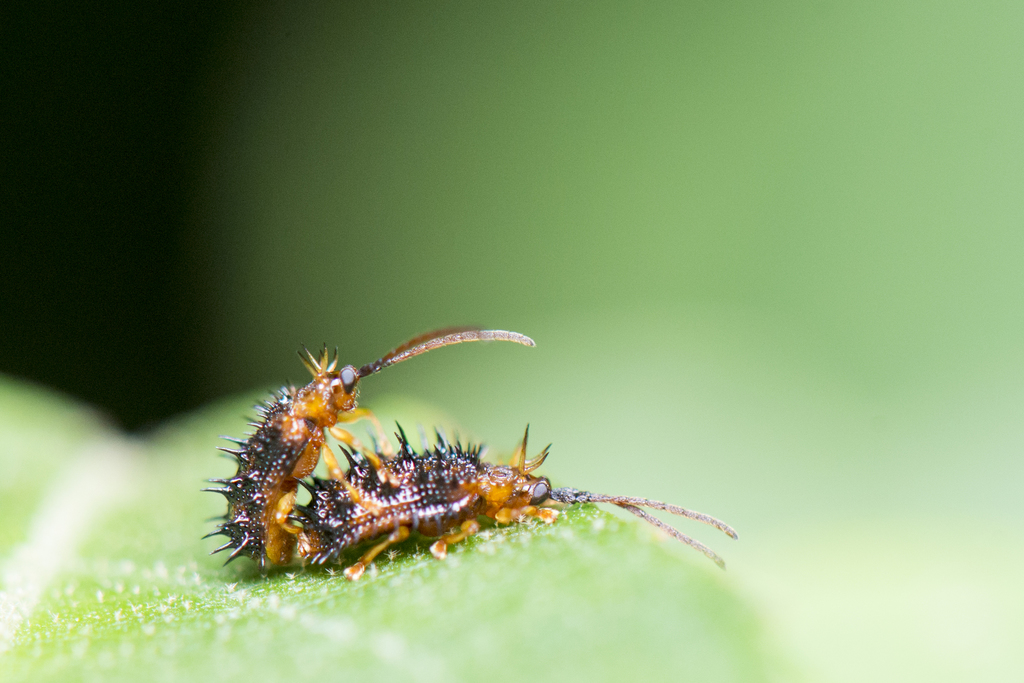

Scientific classification
- Kingdom: Animalia
- Phylum: Arthropoda
- Class: Insecta
- Order: Coleoptera
- Suborder: Polyphaga
- Infraorder: Cucujiformia
- Family: Chrysomelidae
- Genus: Dactylispa
- Species: D. higoniae

Binomial name
- Dactylispa higoniae (Lewis, 1896)

Synonyms
- Hispa higoniae Lewis, 1896; Hispa platyprioides Gestro, 1890; Dactylispa asoka Maulik, 1919; Dactylispa corpulentina Uhmann, 1927; Dactylispa (Triplispa) higoniae szechuanensis Chen & T'an, 1961

= Dactylispa higoniae =

Species of beetle

Dactylispa higoniae is a species of beetle of the family Chrysomelidae. It is found in Bhutan, China (Fujian, Guangdong, Guangxi, Guizhou, Hainan, Hunan, Jiangxi, Sichuan, Yunnan), India (Madras, Sikkim), Japan, Laos, Myanmar, Nepal, Taiwan, Thailand and Vietnam.

== Life history ==
The recorded host plant for this species is Callicarpa mollis.
