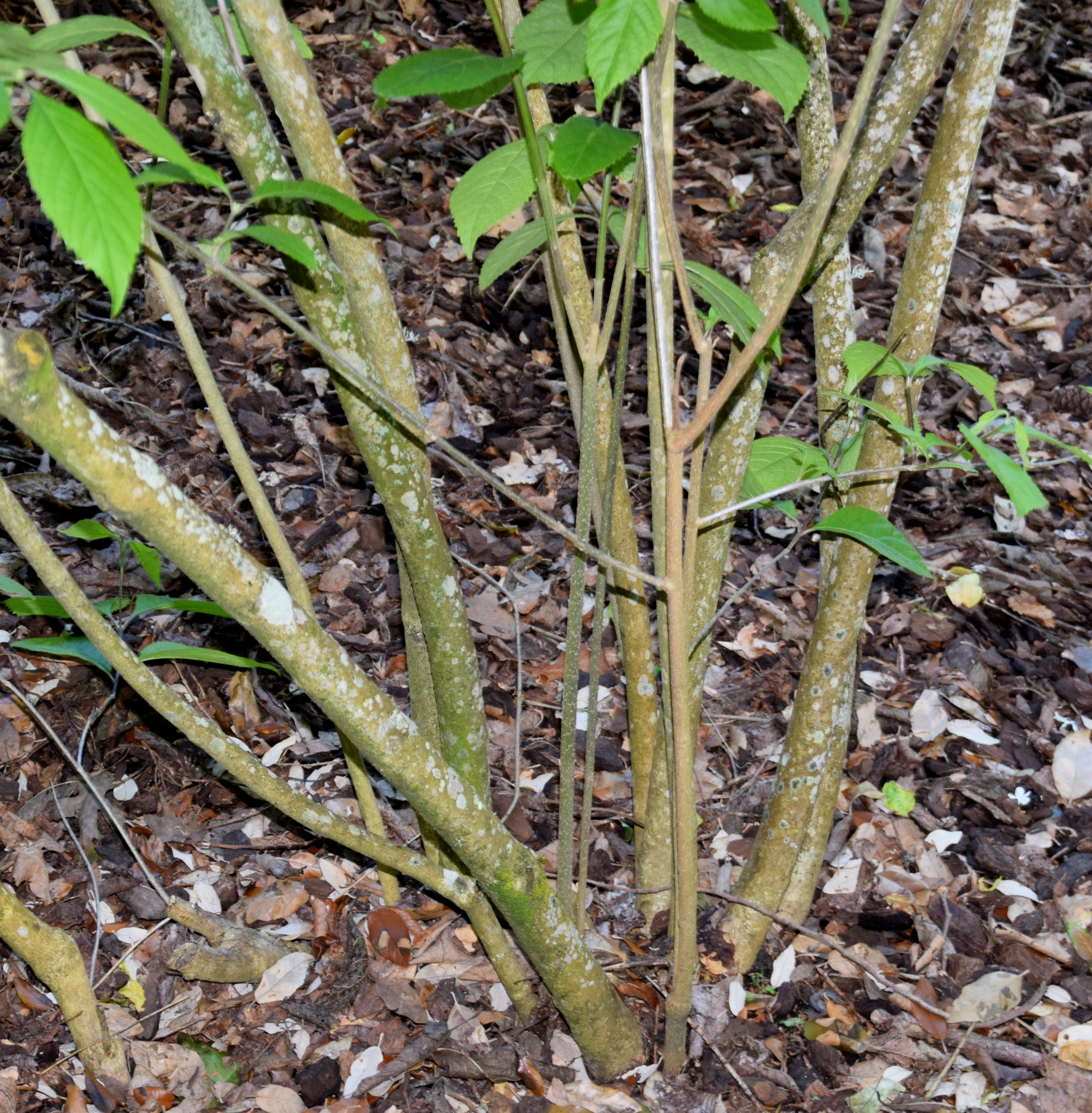

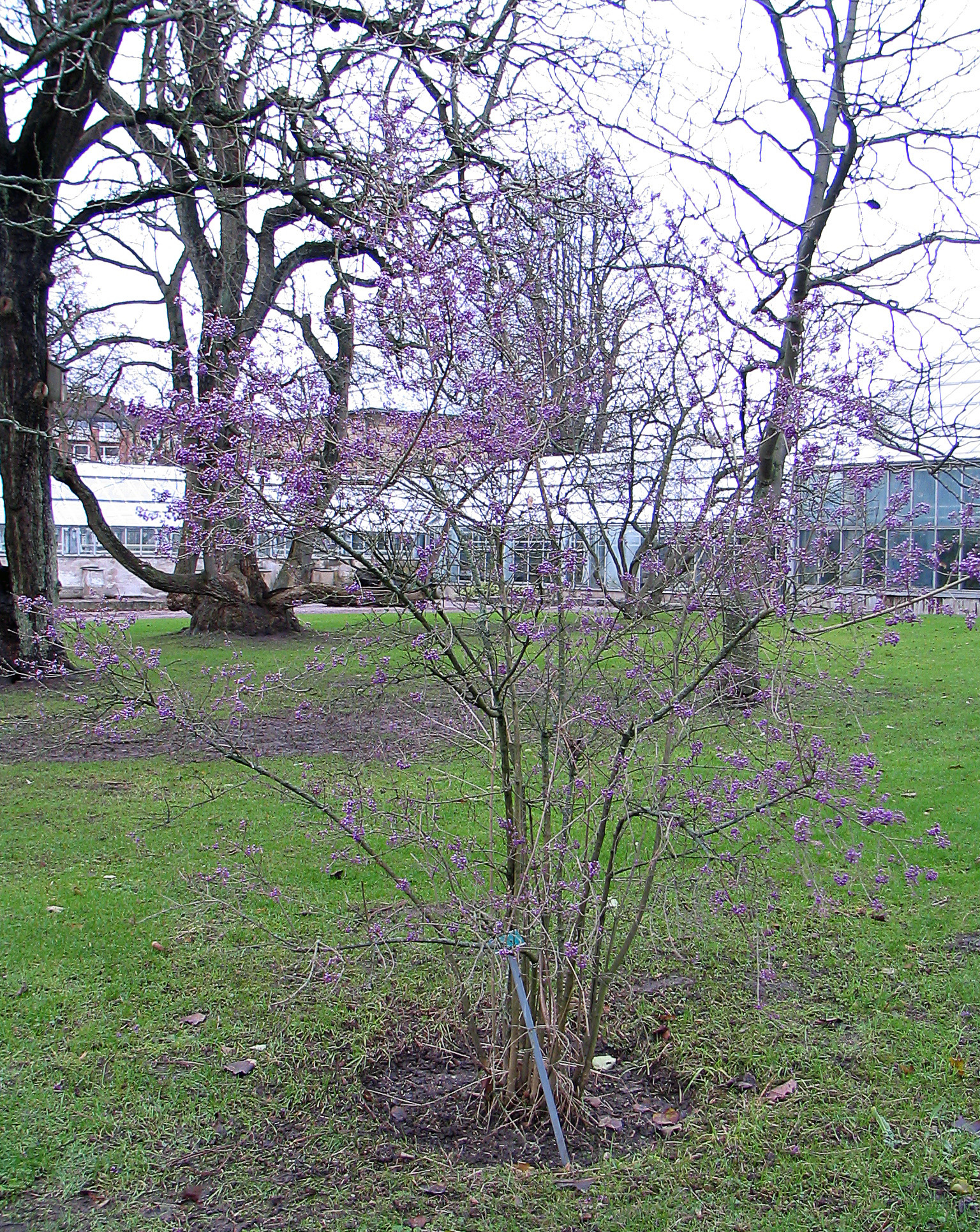
- Specimen in Botaniska trädgården, located in Lund, Sweden

Scientific classification
- Kingdom: Plantae
- Clade: Tracheophytes
- Clade: Angiosperms
- Clade: Eudicots
- Clade: Asterids
- Order: Lamiales
- Family: Lamiaceae
- Genus: Callicarpa
- Species: C. giraldii

Binomial name
- Callicarpa giraldii Hesse ex Rehder

Synonyms
- Callicarpa bodinieri var. giraldii (Hesse ex Rehder) Rehder

= Callicarpa giraldii =

Species of flowering plant

Callicarpa giraldii is a species of shrubby flowering plant in the family Lamiaceae. It is native to Vietnam and China, in which it occurs in the Southeast, South-Central and North-Central subregions of the country.

== Description ==
Deciduous shrub, with an upright growth habit that is typically up to 1-3 meters tall.

== Subtaxa ==
The following varieties are accepted:

- Callicarpa giraldii var. giraldii
- Callicarpa giraldii var. subcanescens Rehder
- Callicarpa giraldii var. chinyunensis (C.Pei & W.Z.Fang) S.L.Chen
