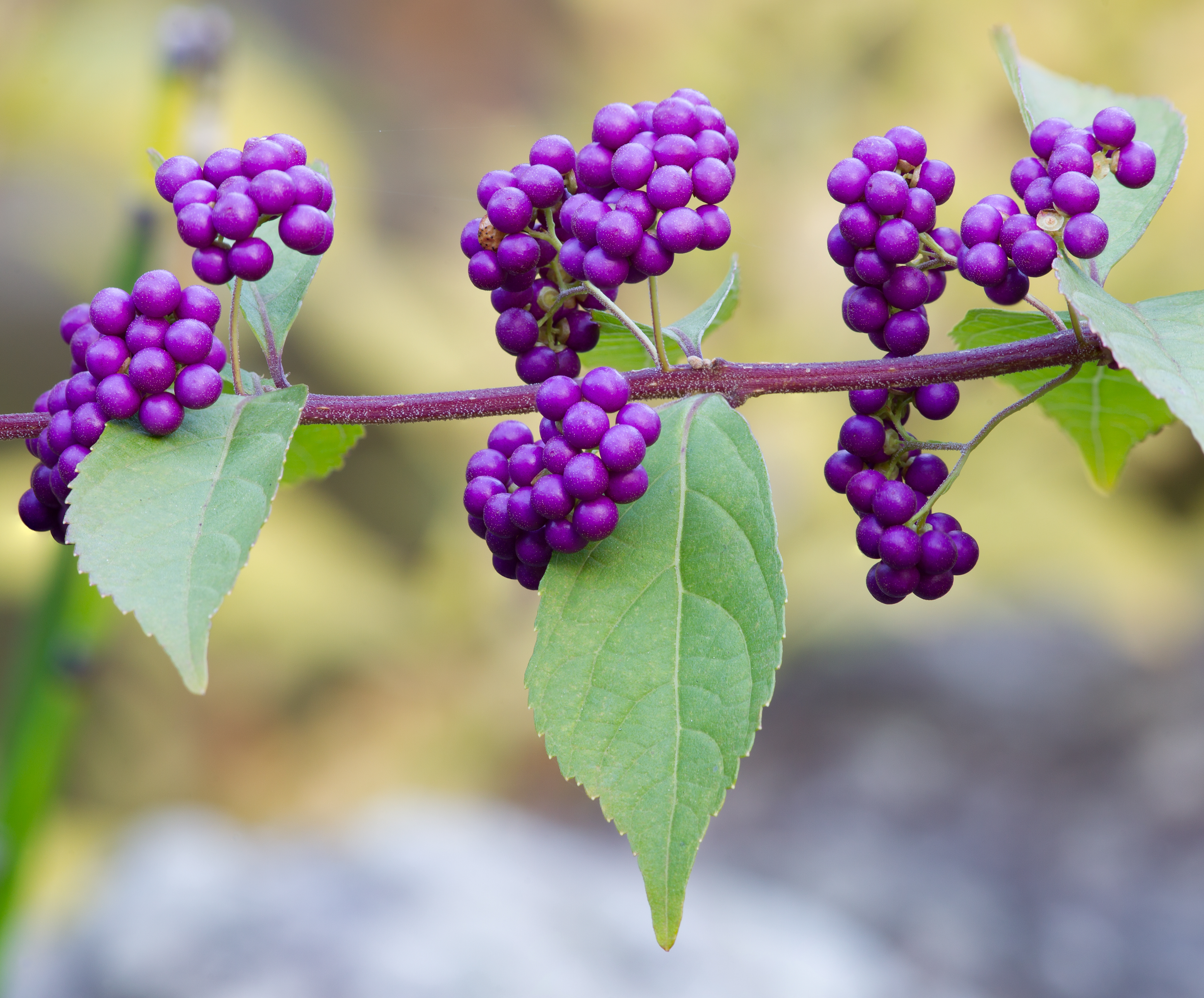
- Callicarpa dichotoma, the purple beautyberry

Scientific classification
- Kingdom: Plantae
- Clade: Tracheophytes
- Clade: Angiosperms
- Clade: Eudicots
- Clade: Asterids
- Order: Lamiales
- Family: Lamiaceae
- Genus: Callicarpa; L.

Synonyms
- Aganon Raf.; Amictonis Raf.; Burchardia Duhamel; Geunsia Blume; Illa Adans.; Johnsonia Mill.; Mamanira Rumph. ex Bosc; Porphyra Lour.; Sphondylococcum Schauer; Spondylococcos Mitch.; Tomex L.

= Callicarpa =

Genus of flowering plants

Callicarpa, commonly known as beautyberry, is a genus of shrubs and small trees in the family Lamiaceae. They are native to east and southeast Asia (where the majority of the species occur), Australia, Madagascar, south-eastern North America and South America.

The leaves are simple, opposite, usually 5-25 cm long. Its flowers are small, white to pink or light purple in color. They produce small clusters of purple drupes along their branches.

== Description ==
The temperate species are deciduous, the tropical species evergreen. The leaves are simple, opposite, and 5–25 cm long. The flowers are in clusters, white to pinkish. The fruit is, in botanical terms, a berry up to 5 mm diameter. They are pink to red-purple with a highly distinctive metallic lustre, and are very conspicuous in clusters on the bare branches after the leaves fall. The berries last well into the winter or dry season and are an important survival food for birds and other animals, though they will not eat them until other sources are depleted. The berries are highly astringent but are made into wine and jelly. Callicarpa species are used as food plants by the larvae of some Lepidoptera species in Asia including Endoclita malabaricus and Endoclita undulifer.

They are widely grown in gardens for their berries, which provide food for animals and birds during the winter. Additionally, some species are used in medicines for fever and rheumatism. It is also used as a mosquito repellent.

== Etymology ==
The Latin name callicarpa derives from the Greek κάλλος (kállos) 'beauty' and καρπός (karpós) 'fruit'.

== Selected species ==
- Callicarpa americana (American beautyberry) is native to the southeastern United States. It can typically reach 1 to 2 meters in height. A jelly can be made from its ripe berries. Ornamental varieties of Callicarpa americana have been bred to have pink or white berries.
- Callicarpa bodinieri (Bodinier's beautyberry), native to west-central China (Sichuan, Hubei, Shaanxi), is more cold-tolerant than C. americana, and is the species most widely cultivated in northwestern Europe. It can reach 3 meters tall.
- Callicarpa japonica (Japanese beautyberry), native to Japan, is also cultivated in gardens. It is called Murasakishikibu in Japanese, in honor of Murasaki Shikibu.
- Callicarpa dichotoma (Purple beautyberry), native to Japan, China, and Korea.
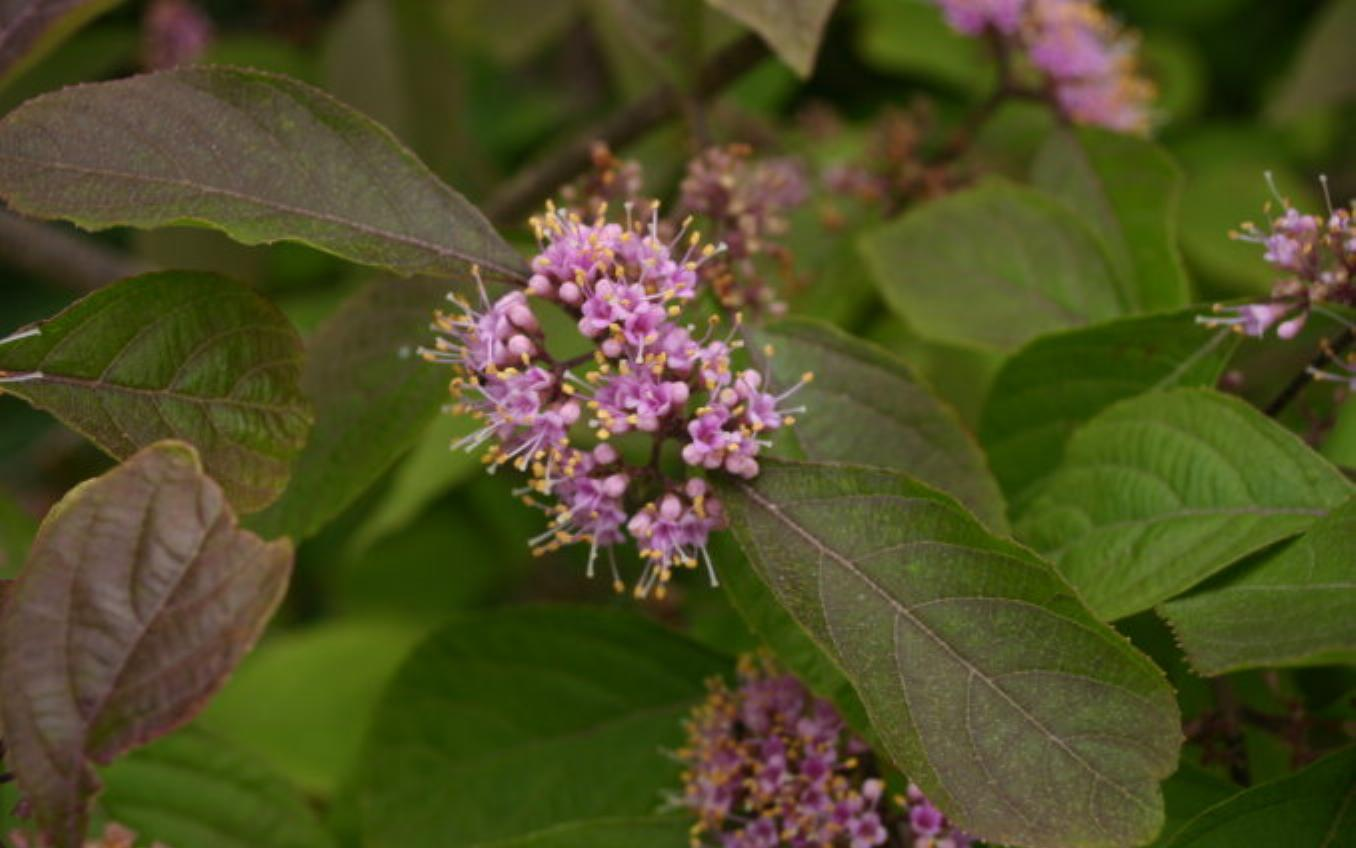
Callicarpa bodinieri

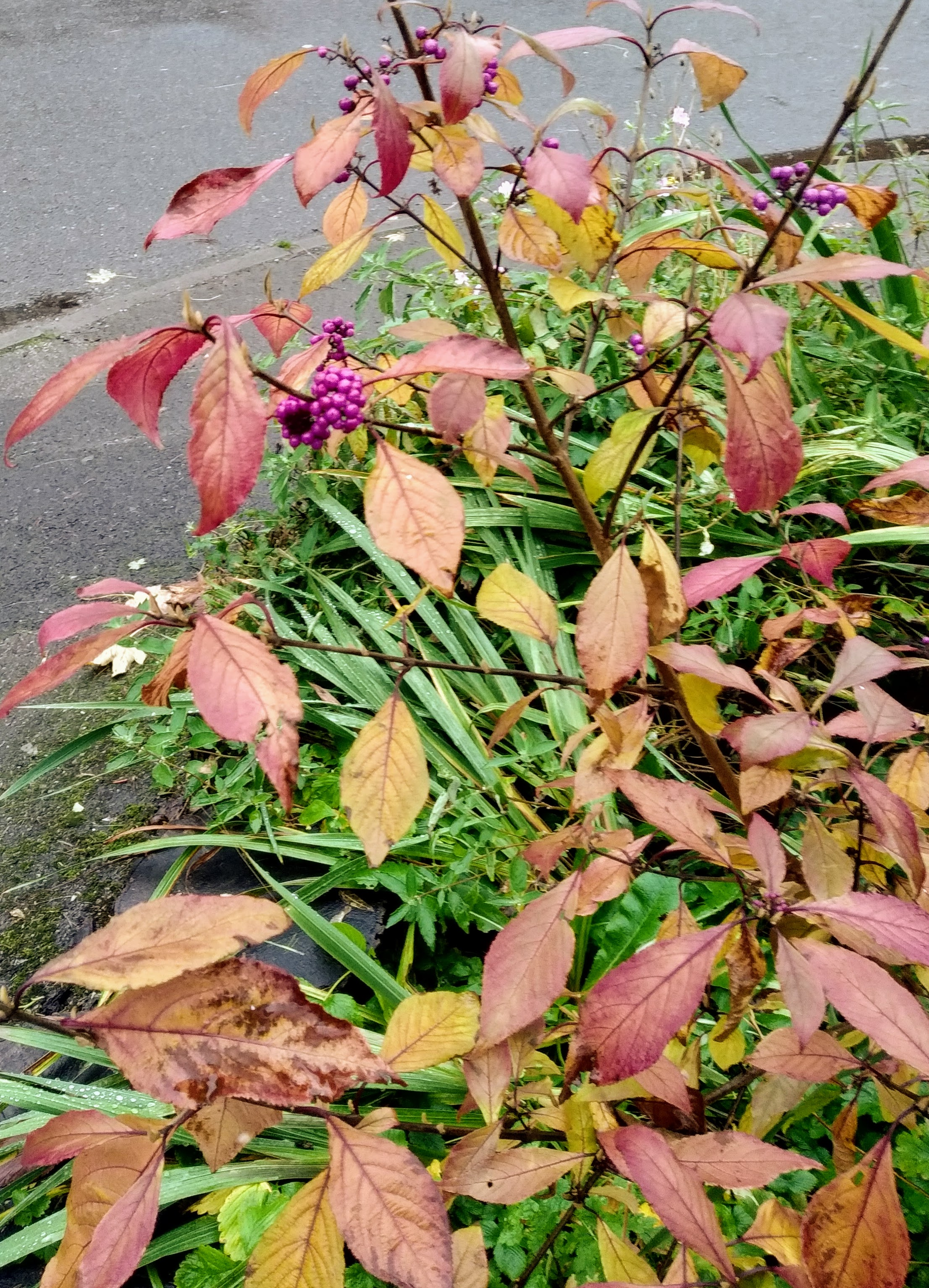
Callicarpa dichotoma in autumn

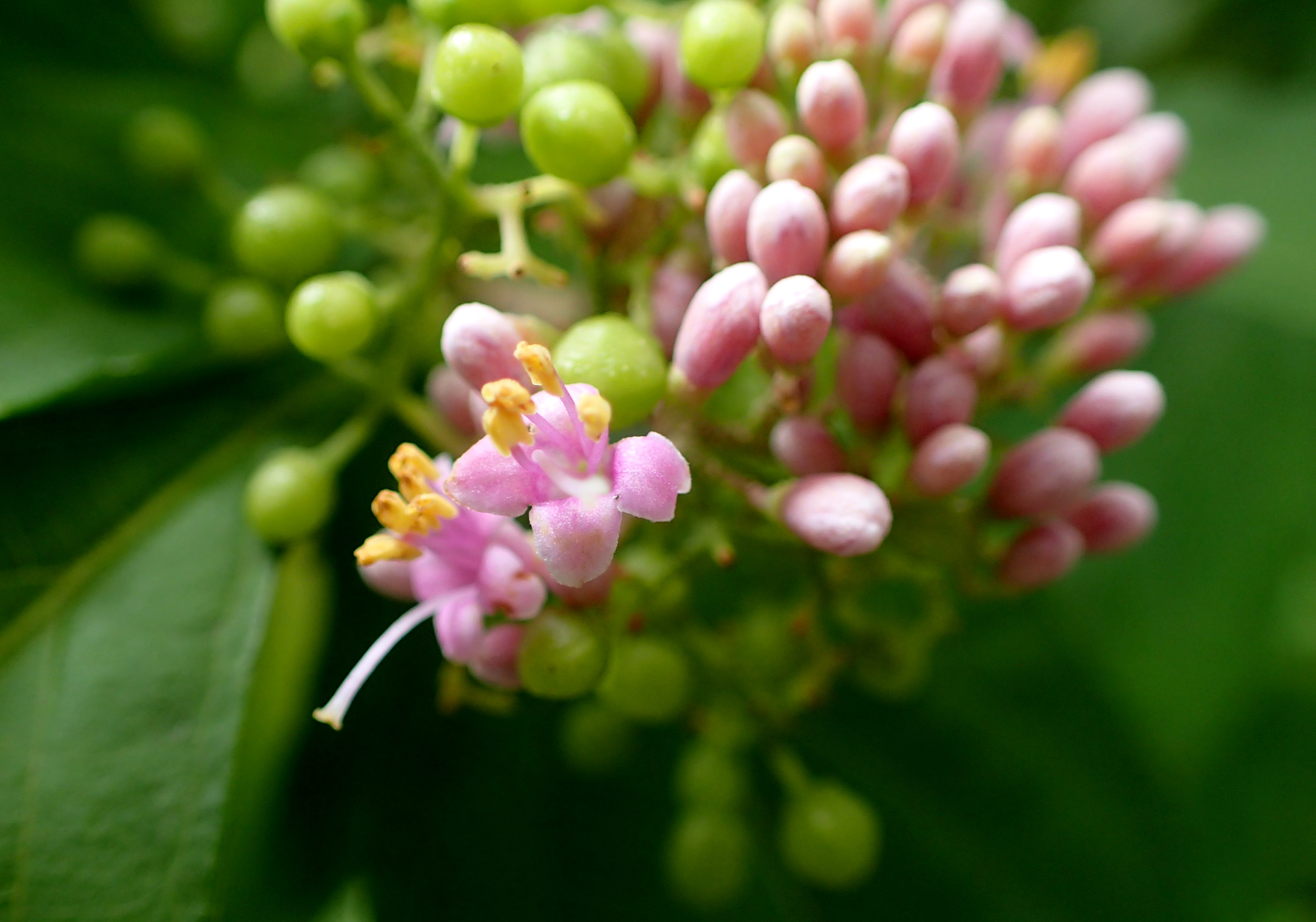
Callicarpa japonica in New York Botanical Garden

== Uses ==
=== Insect repellent ===
American beautyberry has been used as a folk remedy to prevent mosquito bites. Four chemicals isolated from Callicarpa have been shown to act as insect repellents: borneol, callicarpenal, intermedeol, and spathulenol. The use of callicarpenal has been patented by the United States Department of Agriculture's Agricultural Research Service as a mosquito repellent.

== Species ==
As of March 2026, Plants of the World Online accepts the following 164 species:

- Callicarpa aculeolata Schauer
- Callicarpa acuminata Kunth
- Callicarpa acutidens Schauer
- Callicarpa acutifolia C.H.Chang
- Callicarpa albidotomentella Merr.
- Callicarpa alongensis Dop
- Callicarpa americana L.
- Callicarpa ampla Schauer
- Callicarpa angusta Schauer
- Callicarpa angustifolia King & Gamble
- Callicarpa anisodonta Bramley
- Callicarpa anisophylla C.Y.Wu ex W.Z.Fang
- Callicarpa anomala (Ridl.) B.L.Burtt
- Callicarpa apoensis Elmer
- Callicarpa arborea Roxb.
- Callicarpa areolata Urb.
- Callicarpa argentii Bramley
- Callicarpa bachmaensis Soejima & Tagane
- Callicarpa badipilosa S.Atkins
- Callicarpa barbata Ridl.
- Callicarpa basilanensis Merr.
- Callicarpa basitruncata Merr. ex Moldenke
- Callicarpa baviensis Moldenke
- Callicarpa bicolor Juss.
- Callicarpa bodinieri H.Lév.
- Callicarpa bodinieroides R.H.Miao
- Callicarpa bracteata Dop
- Callicarpa brevipes (Benth.) Hance
- Callicarpa brevistyla Munir
- Callicarpa bucheri Moldenke
- Callicarpa candicans (Burm.f.) Hochr.
- Callicarpa cathayana C.H.Chang
- Callicarpa caudata Maxim.
- Callicarpa cinnamomea (Hallier f.) Govaerts
- Callicarpa clemensiorum Moldenke
- Callicarpa collina Diels
- Callicarpa coriacea Bramley
- Callicarpa crassinervis Urb.
- Callicarpa cubensis Urb.
- Callicarpa cuneifolia Britton & P.Wilson
- Callicarpa denticulata Merr.
- Callicarpa dentosa (H.T.Chang) W.Z.Fang
- Callicarpa dichotoma (Lour.) K.Koch
- Callicarpa dolichophylla Merr.
- Callicarpa ekmanii I.E.Méndez & Mabb.
- Callicarpa endertii (Moldenke) Bramley
- Callicarpa erioclona Schauer
- Callicarpa erythrosticta Merr. & Chun
- Callicarpa fasciculiflora Merr.
- Callicarpa ferruginea Sw.
- Callicarpa flavida Elmer
- Callicarpa fulva A.Rich.
- Callicarpa fulvohirsuta Merr.
- Callicarpa furfuracea Ridl.
- Callicarpa gibaroana Baro & P.Herrera
- Callicarpa giraldii Hesse ex Rehder
- Callicarpa glabra Koidz.
- Callicarpa glabrifolia S.Atkins
- Callicarpa gracilipes Rehder
- Callicarpa grandiflora (Hallier f.) Govaerts
- Callicarpa grisebachii Urb.
- Callicarpa hainanensis Z.H.Ma & D.X.Zhang
- Callicarpa havilandii (King & Gamble) H.J.Lam
- Callicarpa hengchunensis S.S.Ying
- Callicarpa heterotricha Merr.
- Callicarpa hispida (Moldenke) Bramley
- Callicarpa hitchcockii Millsp.
- Callicarpa homoeophylla (Hallier f.) Govaerts
- Callicarpa hungtaii C.Pei & S.L.Chen
- Callicarpa hypoleucophylla T.P.Lin & J.L.Wang
- Callicarpa integerrima Champ. ex Benth.
- Callicarpa involucrata Merr.
- Callicarpa japonica Thunb.
- Callicarpa kerrii Leerat. & A.J.Paton
- Callicarpa kinabaluensis Bakh. & Heine
- Callicarpa kochiana Makino
- Callicarpa kwangtungensis Chun
- Callicarpa laciniata H.J.Lam
- Callicarpa lalashanensis S.S.Ying
- Callicarpa lamii Hosok.
- Callicarpa lancifolia Millsp.
- Callicarpa leonis Moldenke
- Callicarpa lingii Merr.
- Callicarpa lobata C.B.Clarke
- Callicarpa loboapiculata Metcalf
- Callicarpa longibracteata C.H.Chang
- Callicarpa longifolia Lam.
- Callicarpa longipes Dunn
- Callicarpa longipetiolata Merr.
- Callicarpa luteopunctata C.H.Chang
- Callicarpa macrophylla Vahl
- Callicarpa madagascariensis Moldenke
- Callicarpa magnifolia Merr.
- Callicarpa maingayi King & Gamble
- Callicarpa membranacea C.H.Chang
- Callicarpa mendumiae Bramley
- Callicarpa micrantha S.Vidal
- Callicarpa moana Borhidi & O.Muñiz
- Callicarpa moldenkeana A.Rajendran & P.Daniel
- Callicarpa mollis Siebold & Zucc.
- Callicarpa nipensis Britton & P.Wilson
- Callicarpa nudiflora Hook. & Arn.
- Callicarpa oblanceolata Urb.
- Callicarpa oligantha Merr.
- Callicarpa oshimensis Hayata
- Callicarpa pachyclada Quisumb. & Merr.
- Callicarpa paloensis Elmer
- Callicarpa pararubella Qiang Wang
- Callicarpa parvifolia Hook. & Arn.
- Callicarpa pauciflora Chun ex H.T.Chang
- Callicarpa pedunculata R.Br.
- Callicarpa peichieniana H.Ma & W.B.Yu
- Callicarpa pentandra Roxb.
- Callicarpa petelotii Dop
- Callicarpa phuluangensis Leerat. & A.J.Paton
- Callicarpa pilosissima Maxim.
- Callicarpa pingshanensis C.Y.Wu ex W.Z.Fang
- Callicarpa platyphylla Merr.
- Callicarpa plumosa Quisumb. & Merr.
- Callicarpa prolifera C.Y.Wu
- Callicarpa pseudorubella C.H.Chang
- Callicarpa pseudoverticillata Bramley
- Callicarpa psilocalyx C.B.Clarke
- Callicarpa quaternifolia (Hallier f.) Govaerts
- Callicarpa ramiflora Merr.
- Callicarpa randaiensis Hayata
- Callicarpa remotiflora T.P.Lin & J.L.Wang
- Callicarpa remotiserrulata Hayata
- Callicarpa resinosa C.Wright & Moldenke
- Callicarpa reticulata Sw.
- Callicarpa revoluta Moldenke
- Callicarpa roigii Britton
- Callicarpa rubella Lindl.
- Callicarpa rubrocarpa S.S.Ying
- Callicarpa ruptofoliata R.H.Miao
- Callicarpa saccata Steenis
- Callicarpa salicifolia C.Pei & W.Z.Fang
- Callicarpa scandens (Moldenke) Govaerts
- Callicarpa selleana Urb. & Ekman
- Callicarpa shaferi Britton & P.Wilson
- Callicarpa shikokiana Makino
- Callicarpa × shirasawana Makino
- Callicarpa simondii Dop
- Callicarpa siongsaiensis Metcalf
- Callicarpa sordida Urb.
- Callicarpa stoloniformis X.X.Su, Z.H.Ma & B.Chen
- Callicarpa subaequalis Bramley
- Callicarpa subalbida Elmer
- Callicarpa subglandulosa Elmer
- Callicarpa subintegra Merr.
- Callicarpa subpubescens Hook. & Arn.
- Callicarpa superposita Merr.
- Callicarpa surigaensis Merr.
- Callicarpa teneriflora Bramley
- Callicarpa thozetii Munir
- Callicarpa tikusikensis Masam.
- Callicarpa tingwuensis C.H.Chang
- Callicarpa toaensis Borhidi & O.Muñiz
- Callicarpa tomentosa (L.) L.
- Callicarpa × tosaensis Makino
- Callicarpa tungyanensis S.S.Ying
- Callicarpa vestita Wall. ex C.B.Clarke
- Callicarpa woodii Merr.
- Callicarpa wrightii Britton & P.Wilson
- Callicarpa yongshunensis Wen B.Xu, Xiao D.Li & Yan L.Liu
- Callicarpa yunnanensis W.Z.Fang
