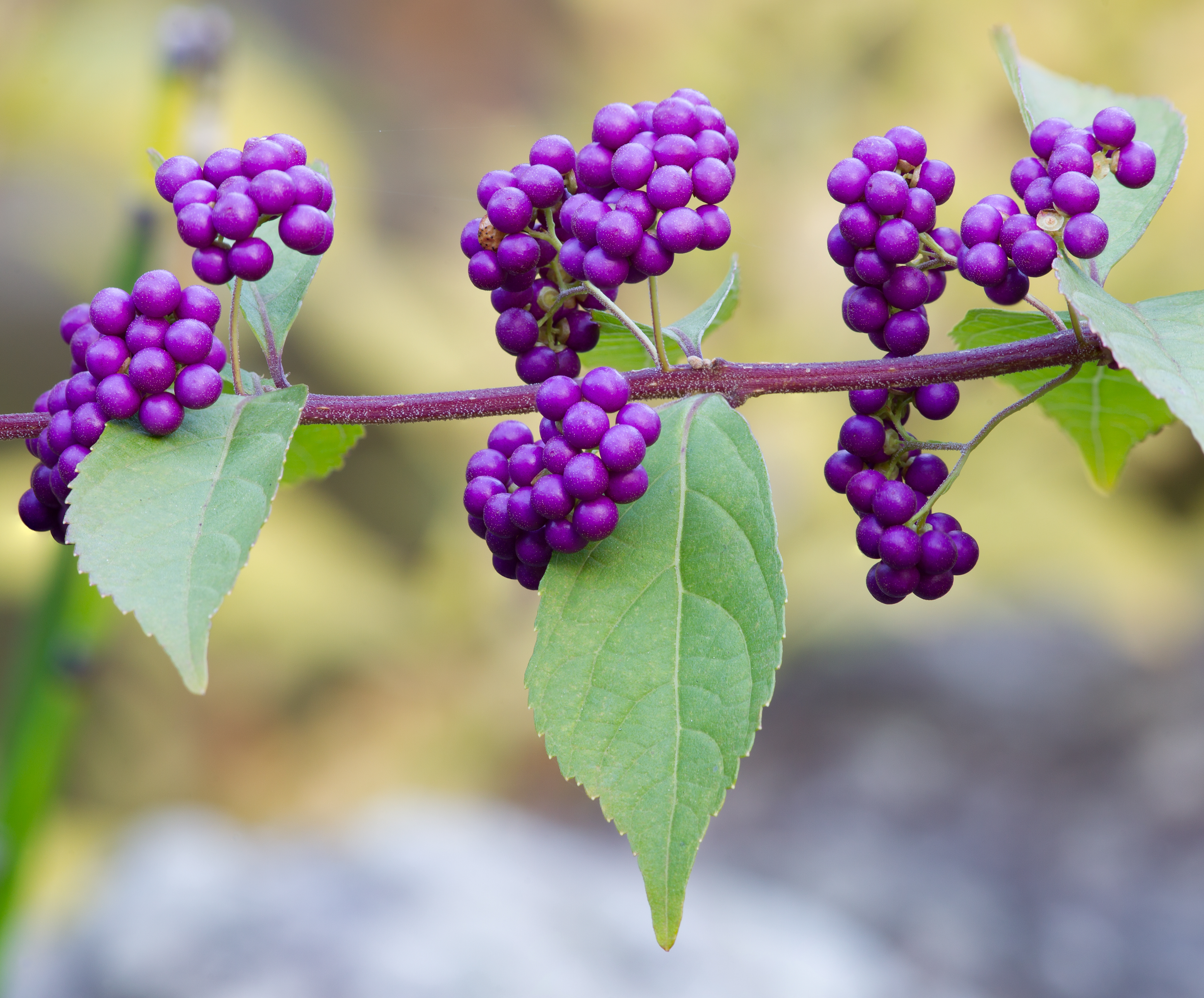
- Purple beautyberry fruits

Scientific classification
- Kingdom: Plantae
- Clade: Tracheophytes
- Clade: Angiosperms
- Clade: Eudicots
- Clade: Asterids
- Order: Lamiales
- Family: Lamiaceae
- Genus: Callicarpa
- Species: C. dichotoma

Binomial name
- Callicarpa dichotoma (Lour.) K.Koch

Synonyms
- Callicarpa japonica var. dichotoma (Lour.) Bakh.; Porphyra dichotoma Lour.; Callicarpa dichotoma f. albifructa Moldenke; Callicarpa gracilis Siebold & Zucc.; Callicarpa jamamurasaki Siebold ex Miq.; Callicarpa japonica var. angustifolia Sav.; Callicarpa purpurea Juss.

= Callicarpa dichotoma =

Species of plant

Callicarpa dichotoma is a species of flowering plant in the family Lamiaceae. It is sometimes referred to by the common names purple beautyberry or early amethyst. They are cultivated as garden shrubs. The flowers are pink to white. The berries which are small drupes are purple. The fruits grow closely together in large clusters. The fruit provides food for wild life. The berries are edible and have a mild taste. This species can be found in China, Vietnam, Korea and Japan.
