= Callicarpa maingayi =

Conservation status
- Least Concern (IUCN 3.1)

Scientific classification
- Kingdom: Plantae
- Clade: Tracheophytes
- Clade: Angiosperms
- Clade: Eudicots
- Clade: Asterids
- Order: Lamiales
- Family: Lamiaceae
- Genus: Callicarpa
- Species: C. maingayi

Binomial name
- Callicarpa maingayi King & Gamble

Species of flowering plant

Callicarpa maingayi is a species of beautyberry plant in the family Lamiaceae. It is found in Peninsular Malaysia, Peninsular Thailand, and Singapore.
