= Callicarpa pentandra =

Scientific classification
- Kingdom: Plantae
- Clade: Tracheophytes
- Clade: Angiosperms
- Clade: Eudicots
- Clade: Asterids
- Order: Lamiales
- Family: Lamiaceae
- Genus: Callicarpa
- Species: C. pentandra

Binomial name
- Callicarpa pentandra Roxb.

Species of flowering plant

Callicarpa pentandra is a species of beautyberry tree. It is a tall, large tree. The leaves are oval-shaped and the flowers are violet. The berries are green when young but become bright pink to purple when ripe. It ranges from India, Southern China, and the Solomon Islands to Borneo. In Borneo its local names are Belau, Bilau, Guro and Kayu hobo.
