= Callicarpa micrantha =

Scientific classification
- Kingdom: Plantae
- Clade: Tracheophytes
- Clade: Angiosperms
- Clade: Eudicots
- Clade: Asterids
- Order: Lamiales
- Family: Lamiaceae
- Genus: Callicarpa
- Species: C. micrantha

Binomial name
- Callicarpa micrantha S.Vidal

Synonyms
- Callicarpa elegans Hayek; Callicarpa phanerophlebia Merr.

Species of flowering plant

Callicarpa micrantha, synonym Callicarpa elegans, is a plant species in the deadnettle family Lamiaceae, native to the Caroline Islands and the Philippines.
