= Callicarpa erioclona =

Scientific classification
- Kingdom: Plantae
- Clade: Tracheophytes
- Clade: Angiosperms
- Clade: Eudicots
- Clade: Asterids
- Order: Lamiales
- Family: Lamiaceae
- Genus: Callicarpa
- Species: C. erioclona

Binomial name
- Callicarpa erioclona Schauer in A.P.de Candolle

Species of flowering plant

Callicarpa erioclona is a species of beautyberry native to Vietnam, Borneo, Sulawesi, Java, Philippines, New Guinea and the Bismarck Archipelago. It produces small berries that grow in tight clusters. The fruit is edible, but is not commercially grown or sold in markets. The flowers are light-pink to white. The leaves can be mixed with coconut oil to treat open wounds.
