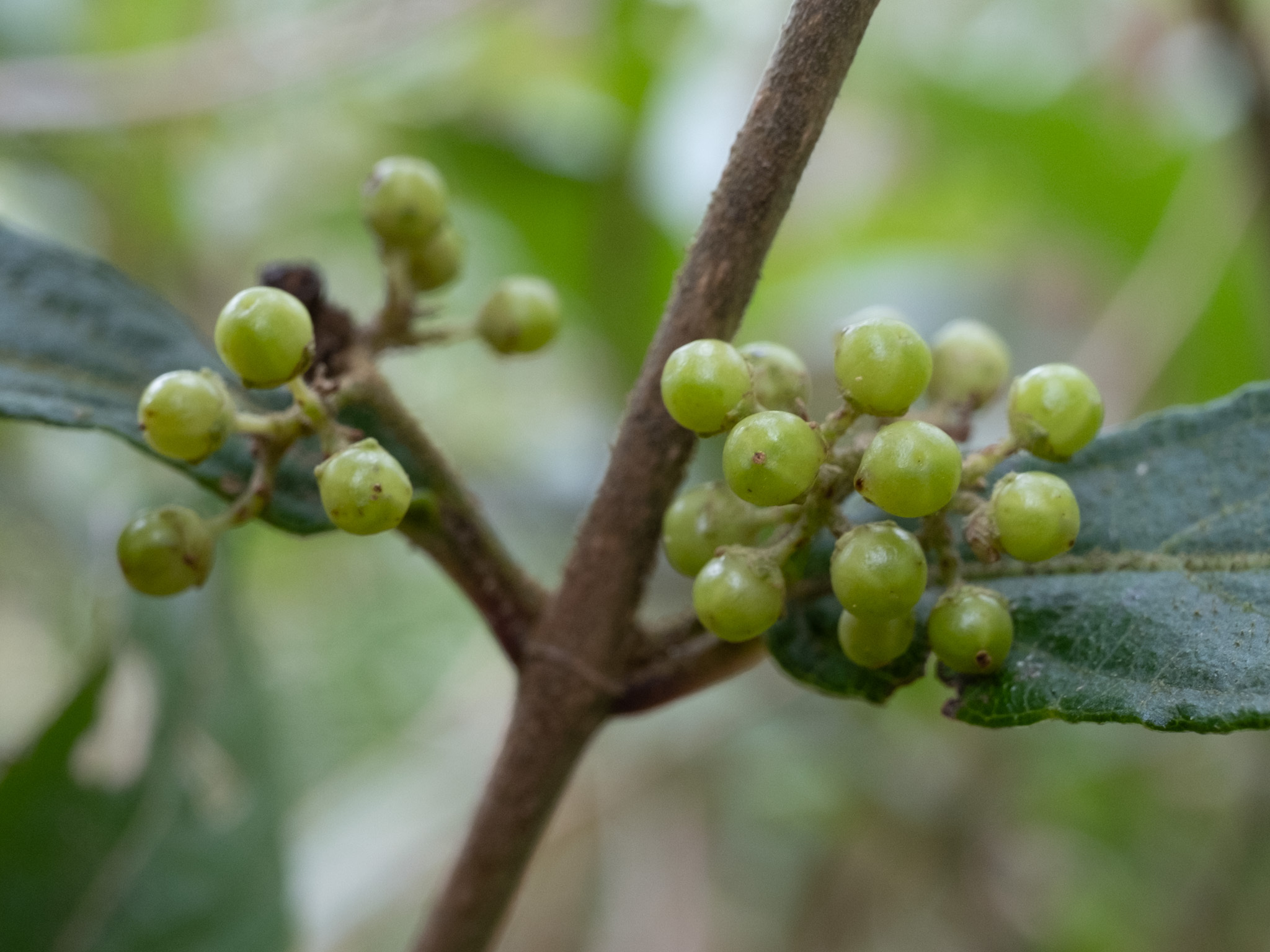
- Immature fruits

Scientific classification
- Kingdom: Plantae
- Clade: Tracheophytes
- Clade: Angiosperms
- Clade: Eudicots
- Clade: Asterids
- Order: Lamiales
- Family: Lamiaceae
- Genus: Callicarpa
- Species: C. tikusikensis

Binomial name
- Callicarpa tikusikensis Masam.

= Callicarpa tikusikensis =

Species of flowering plant

Callicarpa tikusikensis is a species of flowering plant in the mint family (Lamiaceae). It is a shrub endemic to northern Taiwan.

== Description ==
Callicarpa tikusikensis is a woody shrub. As with many other members of the genus Callicarpa, it is characterized by opposite leaves with stellate trichomes and fleshy fruits.

== Distribution and habitat ==
Callicarpa tikusikensis is native to northern Taiwan, where it occurs in subtropical environments.

== Taxonomy ==
The species was described by Gen-ichi Masamune in 1940. Plants of the World Online lists Callicarpa acuminatissima T.S.Liu & C.C.Tseng as an illegitimate name historically applied to this taxon.
