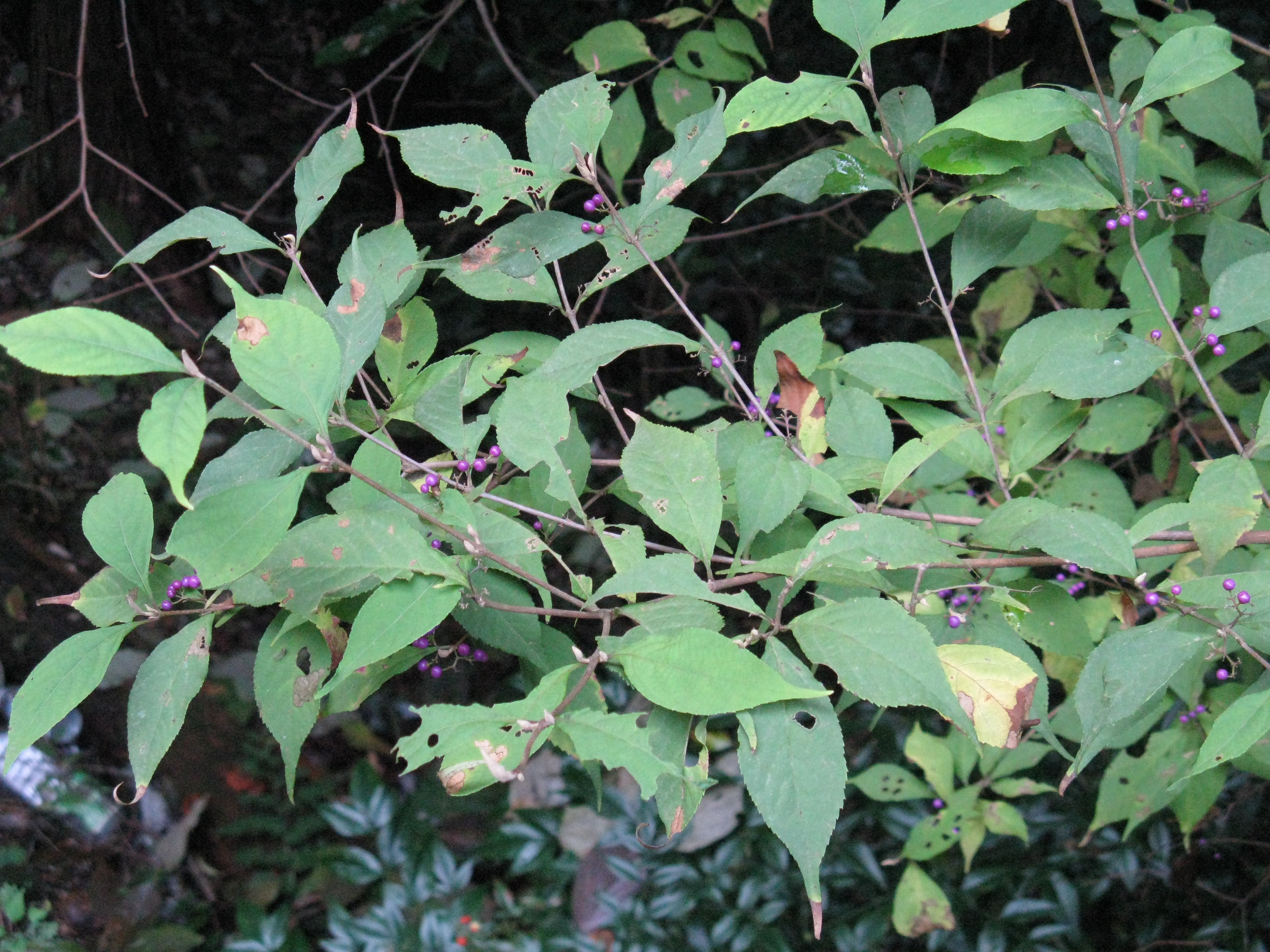

Scientific classification
- Kingdom: Plantae
- Clade: Tracheophytes
- Clade: Angiosperms
- Clade: Eudicots
- Clade: Asterids
- Order: Lamiales
- Family: Lamiaceae
- Genus: Callicarpa
- Species: C. japonica

Binomial name
- Callicarpa japonica Thunb., 1784

= Callicarpa japonica =

Species of plant

Callicarpa japonica, commonly known as East Asian beautyberry or Japanese beautyberry, is a plant in the mint family.

It is a deciduous shrub, most notable for producing purple drupes (its "berries") in the fall. The flowers can range from pink through white. This species is native to China, Japan, Korea, the Ryukyu Islands and Taiwan. It is considered to be a common species in Japan.

It is cultivated as an ornamental bush, and it is very popular in gardens and parks. The fruits are not edible for humans, but are eaten by birds and deer. The leaves can be used to make herbal tea.

== Gallery ==
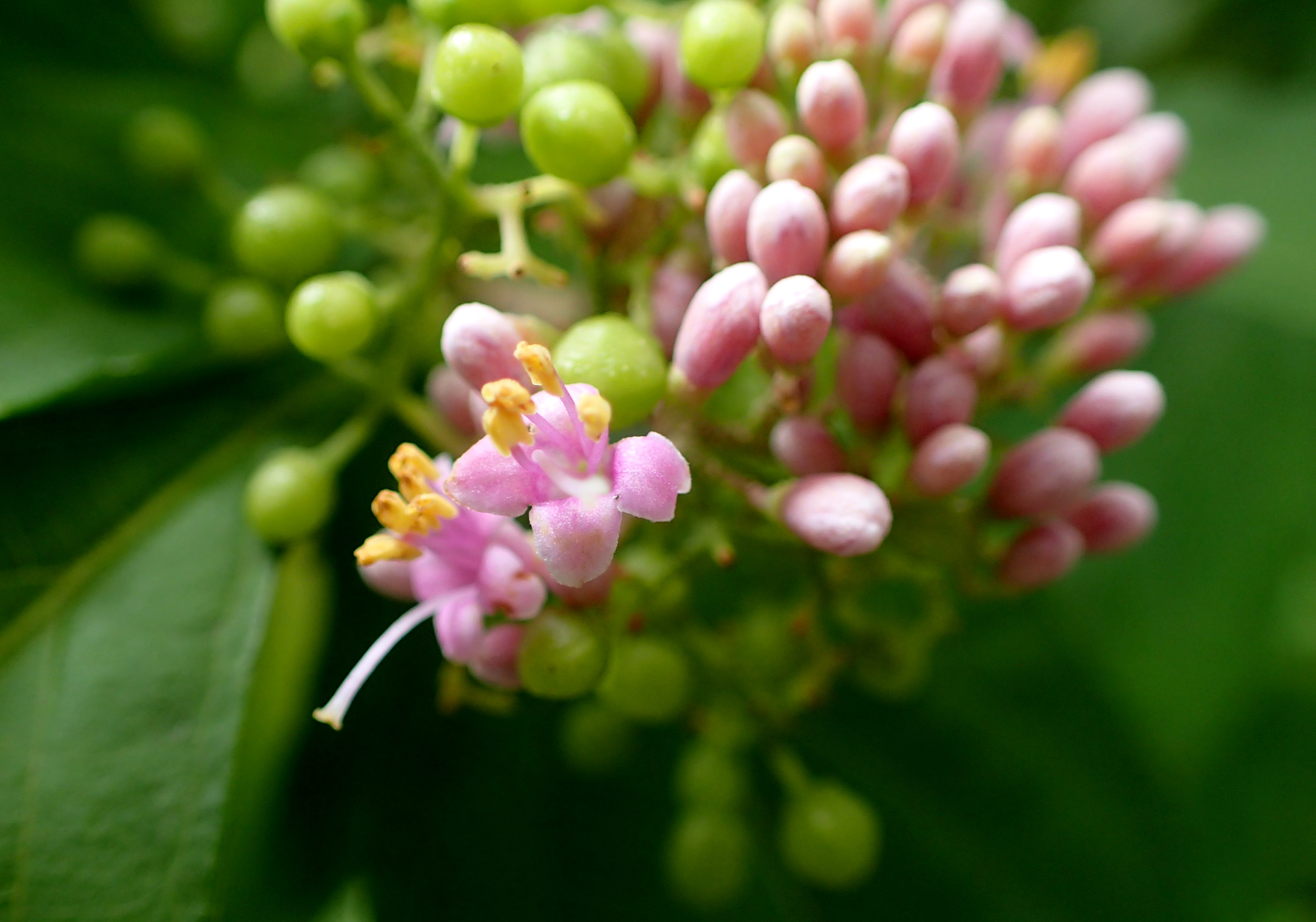
Flowers

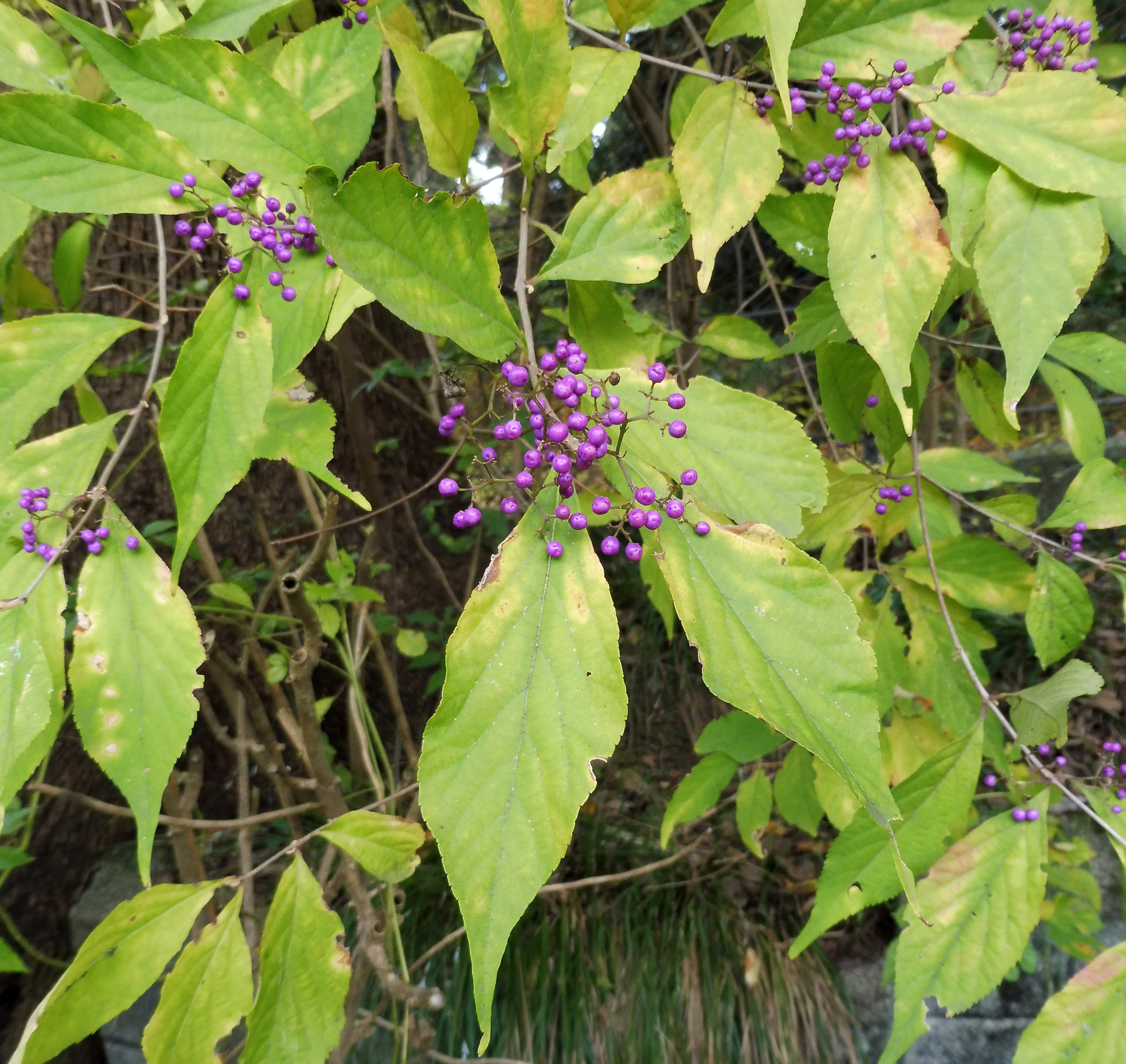
Fruits

Fruits
