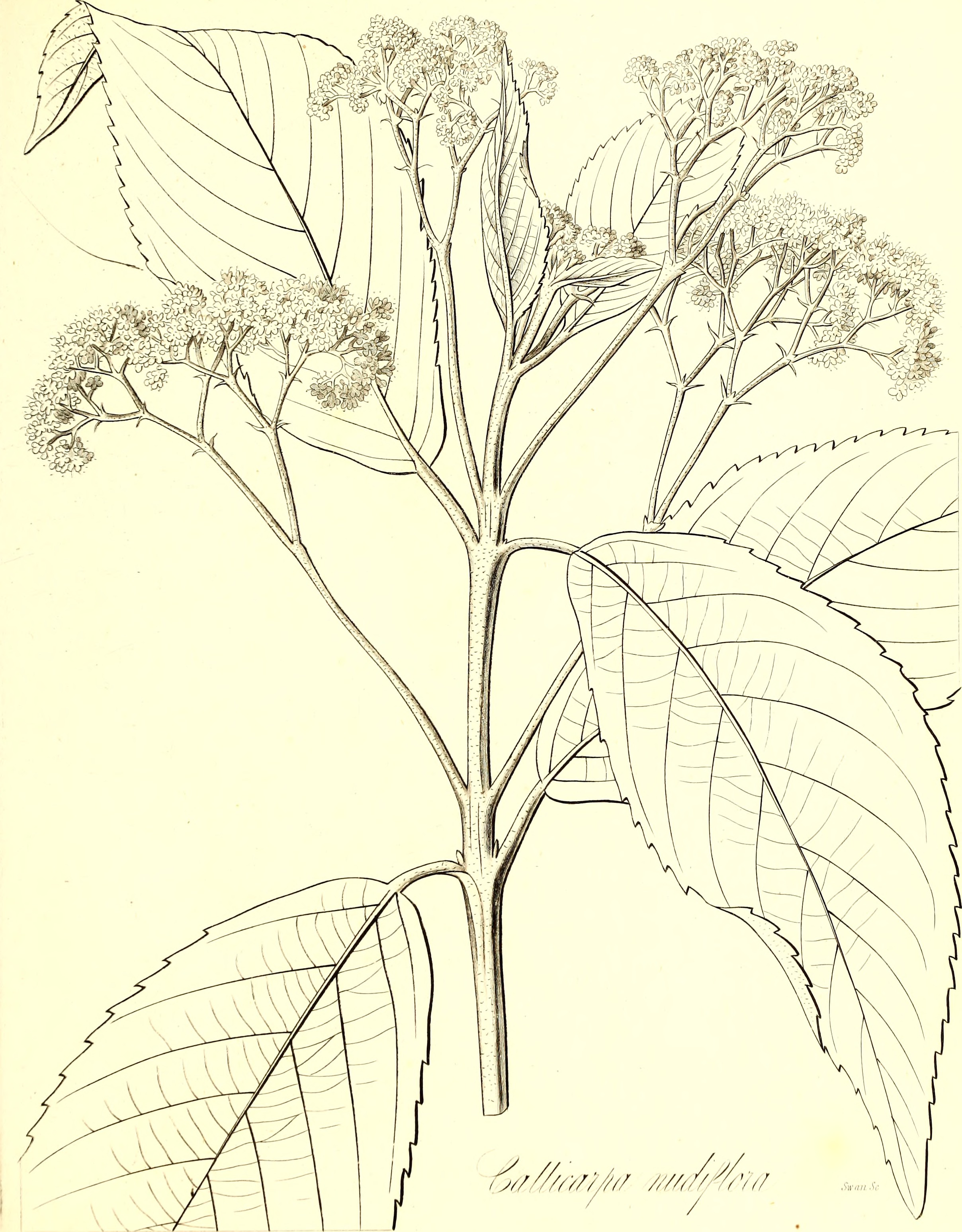

Scientific classification
- Kingdom: Plantae
- Clade: Tracheophytes
- Clade: Angiosperms
- Clade: Eudicots
- Clade: Asterids
- Order: Lamiales
- Family: Lamiaceae
- Genus: Callicarpa
- Species: C. nudiflora

Binomial name
- Callicarpa nudiflora Hook. & Arn.

= Callicarpa nudiflora =

Species of flowering plant

Callicarpa nudiflora is a species of beautyberry that is grown as an ornamental plant. It is native to Southeast Asia. It is a perennial evergreen shrub that grows most prevalently in the Guangdong, Guanxi, and Hainan Provinces. In China it is known as Luo-hua-zi-zhu and is a staple in Chinese folk medicine utilized for its anti-inflammatory, antibacterial, cytotoxic, and hemostatic abilities.
