= Callicarpa longifolia =

Scientific classification
- Kingdom: Plantae
- Clade: Embryophytes
- Clade: Tracheophytes
- Clade: Angiosperms
- Clade: Eudicots
- Clade: Asterids
- Order: Lamiales
- Family: Lamiaceae
- Genus: Callicarpa
- Species: C. longifolia

Binomial name
- Callicarpa longifolia Lam.

Synonyms
- Callicarpa lanceolaria Roxb. ex Hornem; Callicarpa albida Blume; Callicarpa roxburghiana Schult. & Schult.f.; Callicarpa oblongifolia Hassk; Callicarpa attenuata Wall. ex Walp; Callicarpa blumei Zoll. & Moritzi; Callicarpa rhynchophylla Miq; Callicarpa horsfieldii Turcz.; Callicarpa attenuifolia Elmer; Callicarpa nigrescens Merr

Species of flowering plant

Callicarpa longifolia is a species of beautyberry. It ranges from the Himalayas, east to Japan and south to Queensland, Australia. It is grown in yards and gardens as an ornamental plant. The roots are used as an herbal medicine to treat diarrhea.
