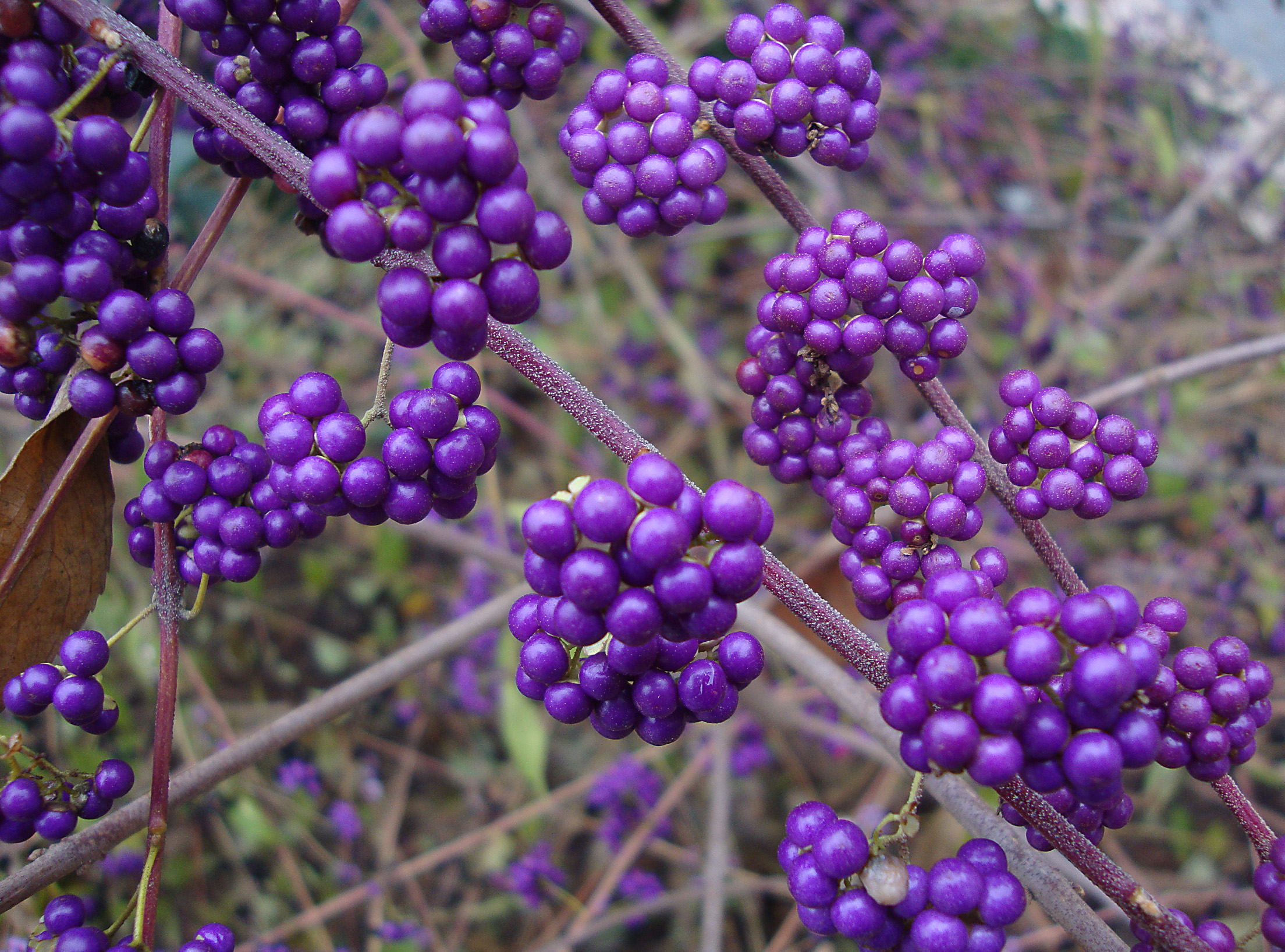

Scientific classification
- Kingdom: Plantae
- Clade: Tracheophytes
- Clade: Angiosperms
- Clade: Eudicots
- Clade: Asterids
- Order: Lamiales
- Family: Lamiaceae
- Genus: Callicarpa
- Species: C. shikokiana

Binomial name
- Callicarpa shikokiana Makino

Synonyms
- Callicarpa shikokiana f. albiflora T.Yamaz.; Callicarpa yakusimensis Koidz.

= Callicarpa shikokiana =

Species of flowering plant

Callicarpa shikokiana, commonly called Shikoku beautyberry or China beautyberry, is a plant species in the Lamiaceae family. It is native to Japan. It is a shrub with pink flowers in summer and purple fruit in the fall. The berry-like fruit is a drupe. It is cultivated in home gardens and national parks as an ornamental plant. The leaves turn yellow in the fall.
