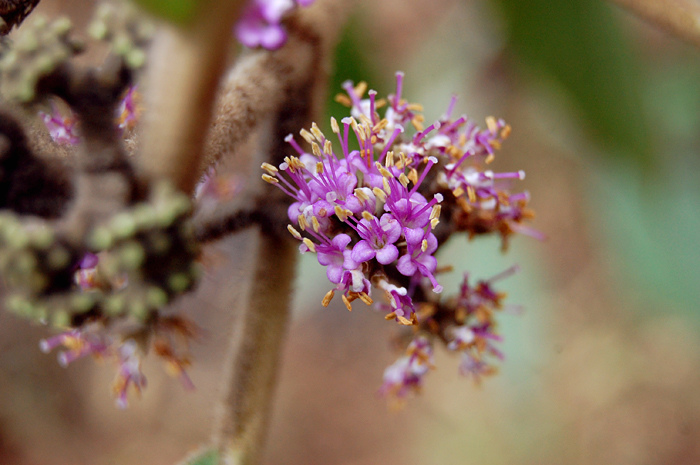

Scientific classification
- Kingdom: Plantae
- Clade: Tracheophytes
- Clade: Angiosperms
- Clade: Eudicots
- Clade: Asterids
- Order: Lamiales
- Family: Lamiaceae
- Genus: Callicarpa
- Species: C. macrophylla

Binomial name
- Callicarpa macrophylla Vahl

= Callicarpa macrophylla =

Species of flowering plant

Callicarpa macrophylla is a species of beautyberry native to the Indian subcontinent. Its fruits are small white drupes.

== Uses ==
The fruit is edible and can be eaten raw when it ripens. The seeds are poisonous. The leaves can also be used to make a herbal drink or as decorations.
