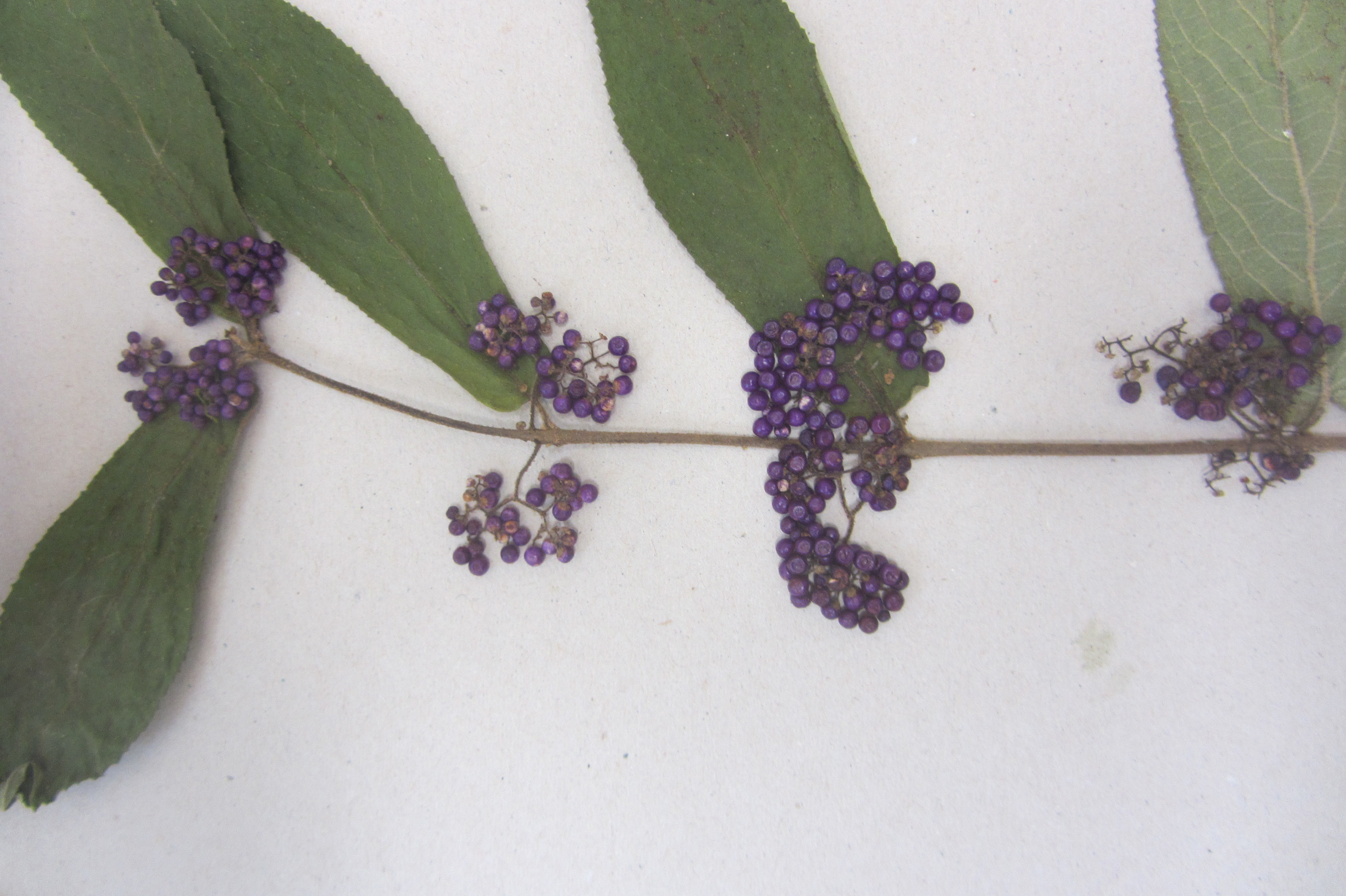

Scientific classification
- Kingdom: Plantae
- Clade: Tracheophytes
- Clade: Angiosperms
- Clade: Eudicots
- Clade: Asterids
- Order: Lamiales
- Family: Lamiaceae
- Genus: Callicarpa
- Species: C. rubella

Binomial name
- Callicarpa rubella Lindl.

= Callicarpa rubella =

Species of flowering plant

Callicarpa rubella is a species of beautyberry native to Southeast Asia. It is a shrub that produces pink or purple flowers followed by dark-purple berries. The berries are actually drupes. It is grown in gardens as an ornamental plant. The fruit attracts wildlife such as birds.

== Native regions ==
C. rubella is native to Assam (India), Bangladesh, Cambodia, China South-Central, China Southeast, the East Himalayas, Hainan (China), Jawa (Indonesia), Laos, Malaya, Myanmar, Philippines, Sulawesi (Indonesia), Sumatra (Indonesia), Thailand, Vietnam.

== Uses ==
The roots of the plant have been used in Indian folk medicine to treat tumors in the large intestine.
