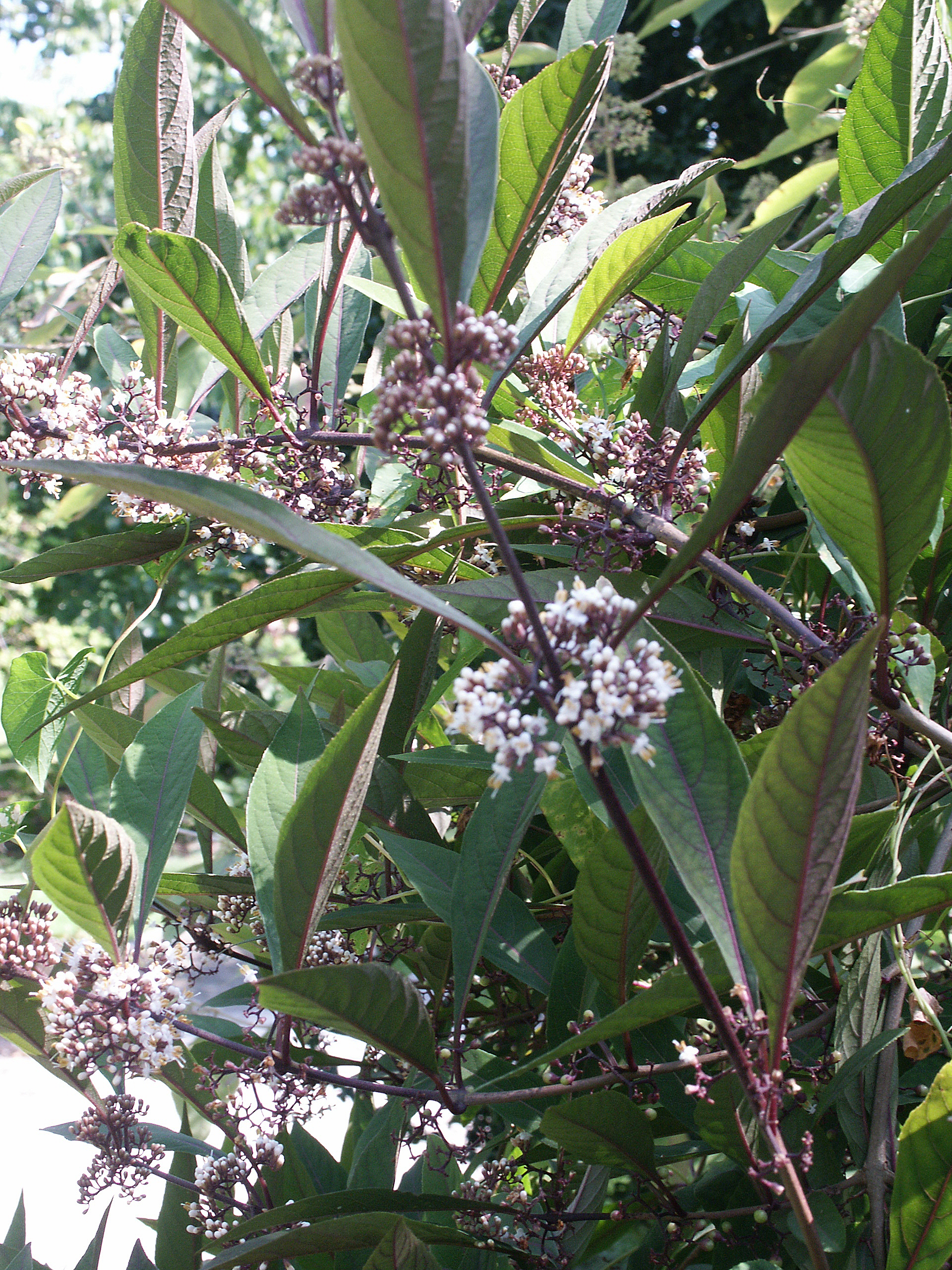

Scientific classification
- Kingdom: Plantae
- Clade: Tracheophytes
- Clade: Angiosperms
- Clade: Eudicots
- Clade: Asterids
- Order: Lamiales
- Family: Lamiaceae
- Genus: Callicarpa
- Species: C. kwangtungensis

Binomial name
- Callicarpa kwangtungensis Chun

= Callicarpa kwangtungensis =

Species of flowering plant

Callicarpa kwangtungensis is a species of beautyberry. The tree is introduced in Europe as an ornamental plant. The fruit is light-pink and grows in small clusters. The flowers can range from pink to white. It is endemic to China. The berries are very bitter and inedible for human use. Birds and other wild life won't eat them unless all their food sources are depleted.
