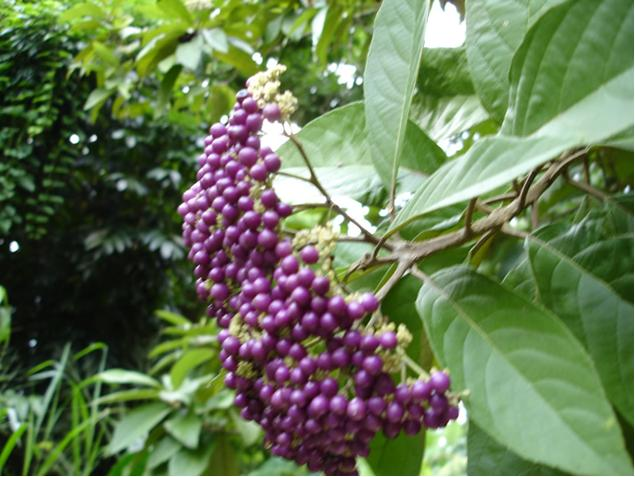

Conservation status
- Critically Endangered (IUCN 3.1)

Scientific classification
- Kingdom: Plantae
- Clade: Embryophytes
- Clade: Tracheophytes
- Clade: Spermatophytes
- Clade: Angiosperms
- Clade: Eudicots
- Clade: Asterids
- Order: Lamiales
- Family: Lamiaceae
- Genus: Callicarpa
- Species: C. ampla

Binomial name
- Callicarpa ampla Schauer

= Callicarpa ampla =

Species of flowering plant

Callicarpa ampla, also called the capa rose, is a species of plant in the family Lamiaceae. It is found in Puerto Rico in the Caribbean region. It is threatened by habitat loss and is a critically endangered plant species.

== History ==
The capa rosa was first collected in Puerto Rico by Heinrich Wydler in 1827. However, it was not until Schaur in 1847 that this plant was identified as the capa rose. Since that time, there have been only seven individuals collected, all but one from Puerto Rico. The exception was collected from St. Thomas in the Virgin Islands by Riedle, but none have been discovered there since. It is questionable whether the species is extirpated from the area, or whether it existed there at all. Once spread through Puerto Rico, it is now only located in the Luquillo Mountains, specifically the palo Colorado forest region.

== Description ==
=== Taxonomy ===
The kingdom indicated this species is a plant. The subkingdom implies that this species is a vascular plant: It has a system of tissues (roots, leaves, and stems) allowing food and water to travel. The superdivision is the classification for seed plants, and the division categorizes the capa rose as a flowering plant. The class indicates the species to be a dicotyledon. The embryo inside each seed produces leaves, or cotyledons, when germinated. This species produces two leaves, thus dicotyledon. The most common characteristic of the subclass of this species is the tight cluster of individual flowers, showing the appearance of one larger flower. The order indicates that the capa rose has opposite, or pairs of symmetrical, leaves. The family is almost all tropical plants with clustered flowers, most native to the western hemisphere. The genus classifies this plant as a beautyberry.

=== Physiology ===
Capa rosa is considered a small evergreen tree or shrub. It can grow up to 15 metres (49 ft) tall. When twigs are young, they are whitish color. The branches are tetragonal, meaning four-sided. The leaves are broad at the middle and taper to the end, somewhat of an elliptical shape that is 8–35 centimetres (3.1–13.8 in) long and 3.5–8 centimetres (1.4–3.1 in) wide. The leaves are a dark green on top and a lighter green beneath. The veins are raised on the bottom with whitish scurfy, and the top is smoother and shiny. The flowers are actinomorphic, or star-shaped. The petals are white and approximately 1.7 millimetres (0.067 in) wide by 1.8 millimetres (0.071 in) long. It is also hermaphroditic, having both male stamens and female pistils and ovary. There are four 5.2 millimetres (0.20 in) long stamens and one 1 millimetre (0.039 in) wide ovary. The berries produced are about 6 millimetres (0.24 in) in diameter and contain four seeds. Ripened seeds are purple, and immature seeds are white.

== Location ==
=== Distribution ===
Presently, the capa rose only exists in Puerto Rico, specifically within the Caribbean National Forest. That forest is divided into several regions of plants, and the capa rose is located in the Palo Colorado region. There were two sites reported in the Rio Blanco district of the Nauguabo municipality. Only one site was discovered in the Mameyes II district, and two sites were in the Jimenez district, both of the Rio Grande municipality.

=== Habitat ===
The Luquillo Mountains are about 15 kilometres (9.3 mi) from the nearest shore. The mountains' highest elevation above sea level is over 1,000 metres (3,280 ft), with precipitation increasing at higher elevations. The palo Colorado region makes up about 17 percent of the national forest. It occurs at elevations higher than 600 metres (1,970 ft). The average annual precipitation for the palo Colorado region is from 300 to 450 centimetres (120 to 180 in). However, the off-season for rainfall is from February to April. The humidity ranges from 90 to 100 percent. The mean temperature in this region is about 21 °C (70 °F). The capa rose grows on the slopes of the mountains, which protects it from severe wind. However, hurricanes do occur in that area from time to time.

== Endangerment ==
=== Causes and factors ===
Not only is the species extremely localized, found in only one section of one country, it is also on an island. This isolation alone causes the species to be at high risk for extinction. However, the capa rose is also facing habitat loss. Its habitat is being lost to deforestation and agriculture. Because Puerto Rico is considered United States territory, the forest habitat for the rose is managed by the USDA Forest Service. Forest management such as trails, cutting, agriculture and shelter construction all endanger the plant further. There are other factors affecting the rapid decline of the plant. There is a very low number of plants in Puerto Rico. The loss of just one plant greatly endangers its survival. The risk of the plant being collected due to its rarity and ornamental value is yet another threat, and for this reason the Forest Service did not list its habitat as critical. This would publish detailed information about the location of the plants, and possibly increase the instances of collection. The location of the capa rosa also suffers a lot of damage due to hurricanes. These hurricanes wipe out existing plants and damage locations for future seedlings to develop. They are also poor reproducers and dispersers, so the protection of the individuals and habitat are all the more crucial.

=== Conservation efforts ===
The capa rosa was listed as endangered in 1992. The recovery plan was implemented in 1995. It outlines what actions should be taken to protect the plant from further loss and increase its population. A management plan required steps to protect the plant and its habitat.

- The plant would be observed for population fluctuations and its reproduction process, as not much is known about it currently.
- Restrictions would be enforced to protect the plant and its environment. This would include punishment for collecting the species. Also, all construction plans have to be approved, thus ensuring the safety of the plant's habitat.
- Education for the awareness of the plant's status would help both the US government and the local government of Puerto Rico protect the plant. Distributed material will help educate in the schools, as well as allowing developers and others identify the plant and understand necessary actions.
- A major part of the plant's recovery plan is to research. As mentioned before, not much is understood about the reproduction and distribution of the species. At the time of the recovery plan, only one location of the plant's seedlings was found. That area was separate from adult, flowering individuals. A search for other localities would be conducted in an effort to find other populations. Observations and studies of these locations will then create an understanding of the necessary criteria for the species to exist in a given environment. This will allow for better selection of introduction sites, should captive reproduction be successful.
- Also, the plan includes acquiring any private land where the capa rosa is found growing.
