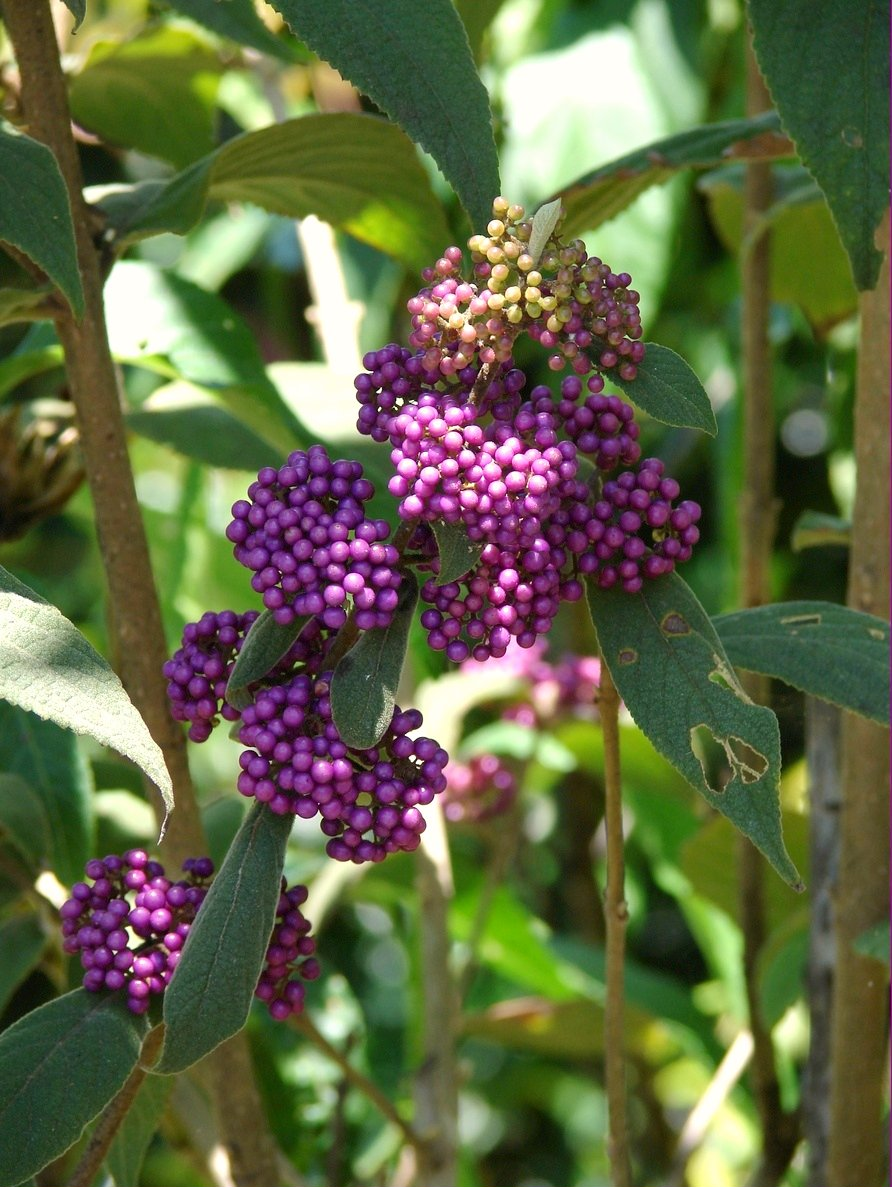

Conservation status
- Least Concern (IUCN 3.1)

Scientific classification
- Kingdom: Plantae
- Clade: Tracheophytes
- Clade: Angiosperms
- Clade: Eudicots
- Clade: Asterids
- Order: Lamiales
- Family: Lamiaceae
- Genus: Callicarpa
- Species: C. pedunculata

Binomial name
- Callicarpa pedunculata R.Br.

Synonyms
- 25 synonyms: Callicarpa pedunculata var. typica H.J.Lam; Callicarpa aspera Hand.-Mazz.; Callicarpa bicolor Fern.-Vill.; Callicarpa blancoi Rolfe; Callicarpa brevipes var. glabrescens Moldenke; Callicarpa cuspidata Roxb.; Callicarpa dentata Roth; Callicarpa formosana Rolfe; Callicarpa formosana f. angustata Moldenke; Callicarpa formosana var. glabrata T.T.Chen, S.M.Chaw & Yuen P.Yang; Callicarpa formosana var. longifolia Suzuki; Callicarpa formosana var. tzitanshaniana S.S.Ying; Callicarpa integerrima var. serrulata H.L.Li; Callicarpa ningpoensis Matsuda; Callicarpa obtusifolia Merr.; Callicarpa ovata C.B.Rob.; Callicarpa pedunculata var. glabriuscula H.J.Lam; Callicarpa pedunculata var. glandulsoa H.J.Lam; Callicarpa pedunculata var. longifolia (Suzuki) C.H.Chang; Callicarpa pedunculata var. psilocalyx H.J.Lam; Callicarpa rubella f. robusta C.Pei; Callicarpa taiwaniana Suzuki; Callicarpa tiliifolia Teijsm. & Binn. ex C.B.Clarke; Callicarpa tzitanshaniana (S.S.Ying) S.S.Ying; Callicarpa viridis Domin

= Callicarpa pedunculata =

Species of flowering plant

Callicarpa pedunculata, commonly known as beautyberry or velvet-leaf, is a species of plant in the mint and sage family Lamiaceae. It is native to tropical areas from northeast India and southeast China, through the Philippines and New Guinea to eastern Australia. It was first described by Scottish botanist Robert Brown in 1810.

== Description ==
C. pedunculata is a shrub growing up to 4 m high. The twigs, the petioles and the underside of the leaf blade have a covering of stalked stellate hairs, while the upper surface of the leaf has a covering of stellate and simple hairs which become sparse when older. The Leaf blades are about 6-18 x 3-6 cm, and there are small, pale yellow, glands on the underside of the leaf. The bottom part of the leaf has smooth margins but the remainder is toothed.

The inflorescences are 2 to 3 cm long, and sometimes inserted a little above leaf axil. The flowers have stalks which are 0.5 to 1 mm long, while the calyx 1 to 1.5 mm long, and the purple or mauve corolla is 2 to 3 mm long. The fruit are whitish to purple drupes.

== Uses ==
It is grown as an ornamental shrub. The fruit is astringent and too acidic to be eaten by people.
