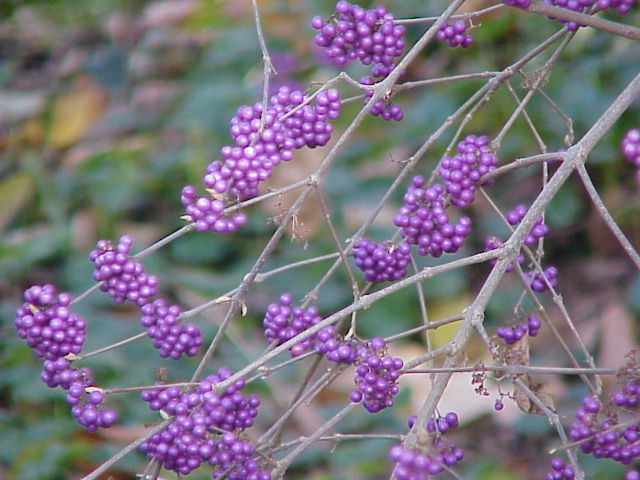

Scientific classification
- Kingdom: Plantae
- Clade: Embryophytes
- Clade: Tracheophytes
- Clade: Angiosperms
- Clade: Eudicots
- Clade: Asterids
- Order: Lamiales
- Family: Lamiaceae
- Genus: Callicarpa
- Species: C. bodinieri

Binomial name
- Callicarpa bodinieri H.Léveillé

= Callicarpa bodinieri =

Species of flowering plant

Callicarpa bodinieri, or Bodinier's beautyberry, is a species of flowering plant in the genus Callicarpa of the family Lamiaceae, native to West and Central China. Growing to 3 m (10 ft) tall by 2.5 m (8 ft) wide, it is an upright deciduous shrub with dark green leaves turning red in autumn (fall). In midsummer, small lilac flowers are produced in the leaf axils. But it is grown in gardens primarily for its small, decorative purple berries in tight clusters in autumn.

The Latin specific epithet bodinieri refers to Émile-Marie Bodinier, a French missionary and botanist of the 19th century, who collected plants in China.

The cultivar C. bodinieri var. giraldii 'Profusion' has gained the Royal Horticultural Society's Award of Garden Merit.
