= Callicarpa thozetii =

Conservation status
- Endangered (NCA)

Scientific classification
- Kingdom: Plantae
- Clade: Tracheophytes
- Clade: Angiosperms
- Clade: Eudicots
- Clade: Asterids
- Order: Lamiales
- Family: Lamiaceae
- Genus: Callicarpa
- Species: C. thozetii

Binomial name
- Callicarpa thozetii Munir, A.A.

Species of shrub

Callicarpa thozetii is a rare shrub which is endemic to Queensland.

== Distribution and habitat ==
Callicarpa thozetii possesses a restricted range only occurring in three locations in Queensland, Australia which include Condor Hills near Midge Point, Shoalwater Bay and Mount Archer National Park. This species occurs in tall eucalyptus woodland and semi-evergreen vine thickets and forests.

== Conservation status ==
Callicarpa thozetii is listed as "endangered" under the Queensland Nature Conservation Act 1992. It is not listed under the Australian Government Environment Protection and Biodiversity Conservation Act 1999.
