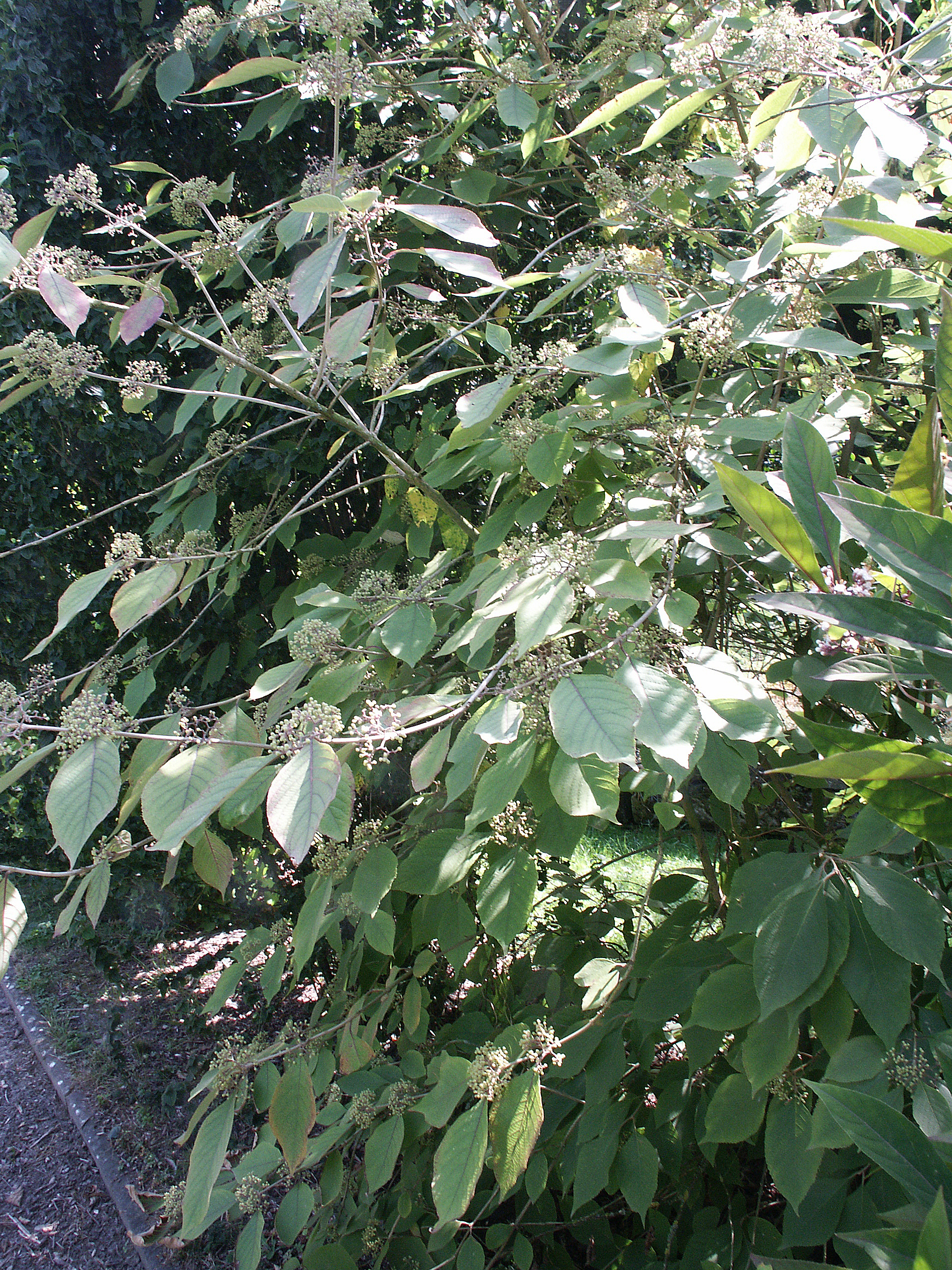

Scientific classification
- Kingdom: Plantae
- Clade: Tracheophytes
- Clade: Angiosperms
- Clade: Eudicots
- Clade: Asterids
- Order: Lamiales
- Family: Lamiaceae
- Genus: Callicarpa
- Species: C. cathayana

Binomial name
- Callicarpa cathayana C.H.Chang

= Callicarpa cathayana =

Species of flowering plant

Callicarpa cathayana is a species of beautyberry. It is grown in gardens and parks as an ornamental plant for its decorative pink flowers and berries. The purple berries are a drupe. They are not edible for humans. Birds eat the berries and disperse the seeds. The species are endangered in the wild. Callicarpa cathayana is native to China.
