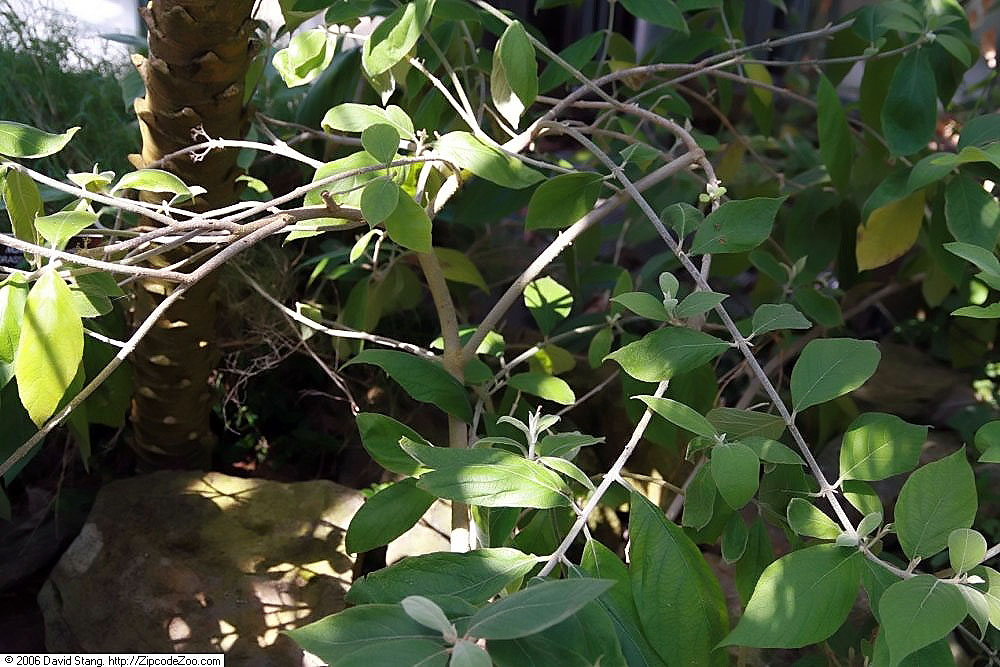

Conservation status
- Least Concern (IUCN 3.1)

Scientific classification
- Kingdom: Plantae
- Clade: Tracheophytes
- Clade: Angiosperms
- Clade: Eudicots
- Clade: Asterids
- Order: Lamiales
- Family: Lamiaceae
- Genus: Callicarpa
- Species: C. acuminata

Binomial name
- Callicarpa acuminata Kunth

Synonyms
- Callicarpa subintegerrima Kunth; Callicarpa bonplandiana Schult. & Schult.f.; Callicarpa mollis Willd. ex Schauer; Callicarpa schlimii Turcz.; Callicarpa minutiflora Rusby; Aegiphila minutiflora Rusby ex Moldenke; Callicarpa pringlei Briq.

= Callicarpa acuminata =

Species of flowering plant

Callicarpa acuminata is a species of beautyberry native to Latin America from Mexico to Bolivia. Unlike the other species of this genus, C. acuminata produces small berry-like fruits which can be dark-purple or dark blue-purple. The fruit can sometimes be white. The flowers blooms are white. The fruit grow in tight clumps and sometimes resemble grapes. They are cultivated as garden trees.

Three varieties are recognized:

1. Callicarpa acuminata var. acuminata - from Mexico to Bolivia
2. Callicarpa acuminata var. argutidentata Moldenke - Tamaulipas, Honduras
3. Callicarpa acuminata var. pringlei (Briq.) Moldenke - eastern Mexico from Tamaulipas to Chiapas
