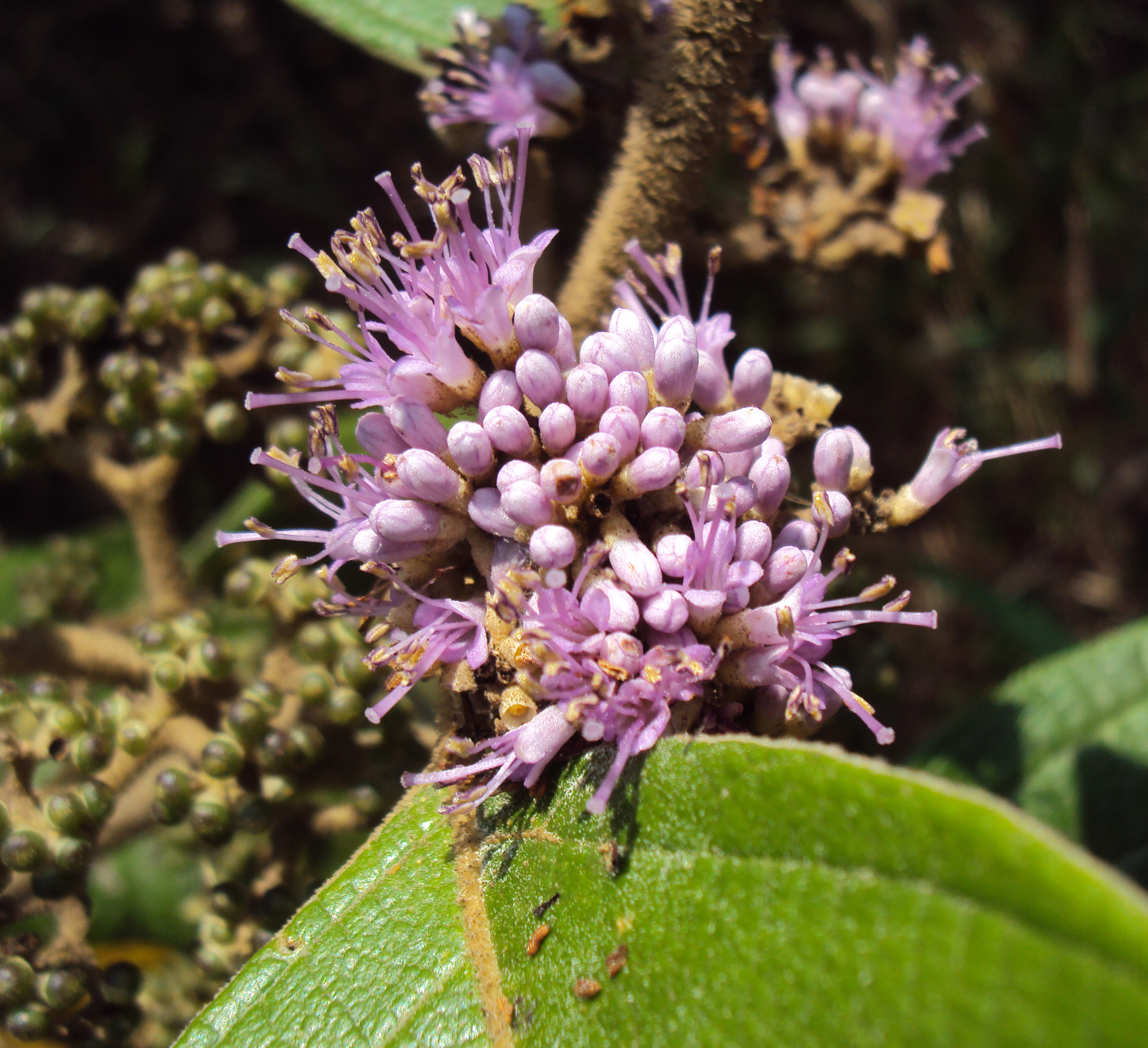

Scientific classification
- Kingdom: Plantae
- Clade: Tracheophytes
- Clade: Angiosperms
- Clade: Eudicots
- Clade: Asterids
- Order: Lamiales
- Family: Lamiaceae
- Genus: Callicarpa
- Species: C. tomentosa

Binomial name
- Callicarpa tomentosa (L.) L.

Synonyms
- Callicarpa arborea Miq. ex C.B.Clarke [Invalid]; Callicarpa farinosa Roxb. ex C.B.Clarke [Invalid]; Callicarpa lanata L. [Illegitimate]; Callicarpa lobata C.B.Clarke; Callicarpa tomentosa var. lanata (L.) Bakh.; Callicarpa tomex Poir. [Illegitimate]; Callicarpa villosa Vahl; Callicarpa wallichiana Walp.; Cornutia corymbosa Lam. [Illegitimate]; Hedyotis arborescens Noronha [Invalid]; Tomex tomentosa L.

= Callicarpa tomentosa =

Species of flowering plant

Callicarpa tomentosa is a species of beautyberry plant in the family Lamiaceae. It is found in Western Ghats of India and Sri Lanka. It is a small tree with about 5m tall. Leaves simple, opposite; elliptic to broadly elliptic; apex acute or acuminate. Purplish flowers show branched axillary cymes. Fruit is 3-4 seeded globose drupe. Fruits provide food for wildlife. They are sometimes used to make herbal medicine. The leaves are also food for wildlife.

The leaf is known being used as a wick to light an oil lamp.

In Hinduism, it is said in the legends that when the pandavas went to exile, they lit the tree by applying oil to the leaves and burning them.
