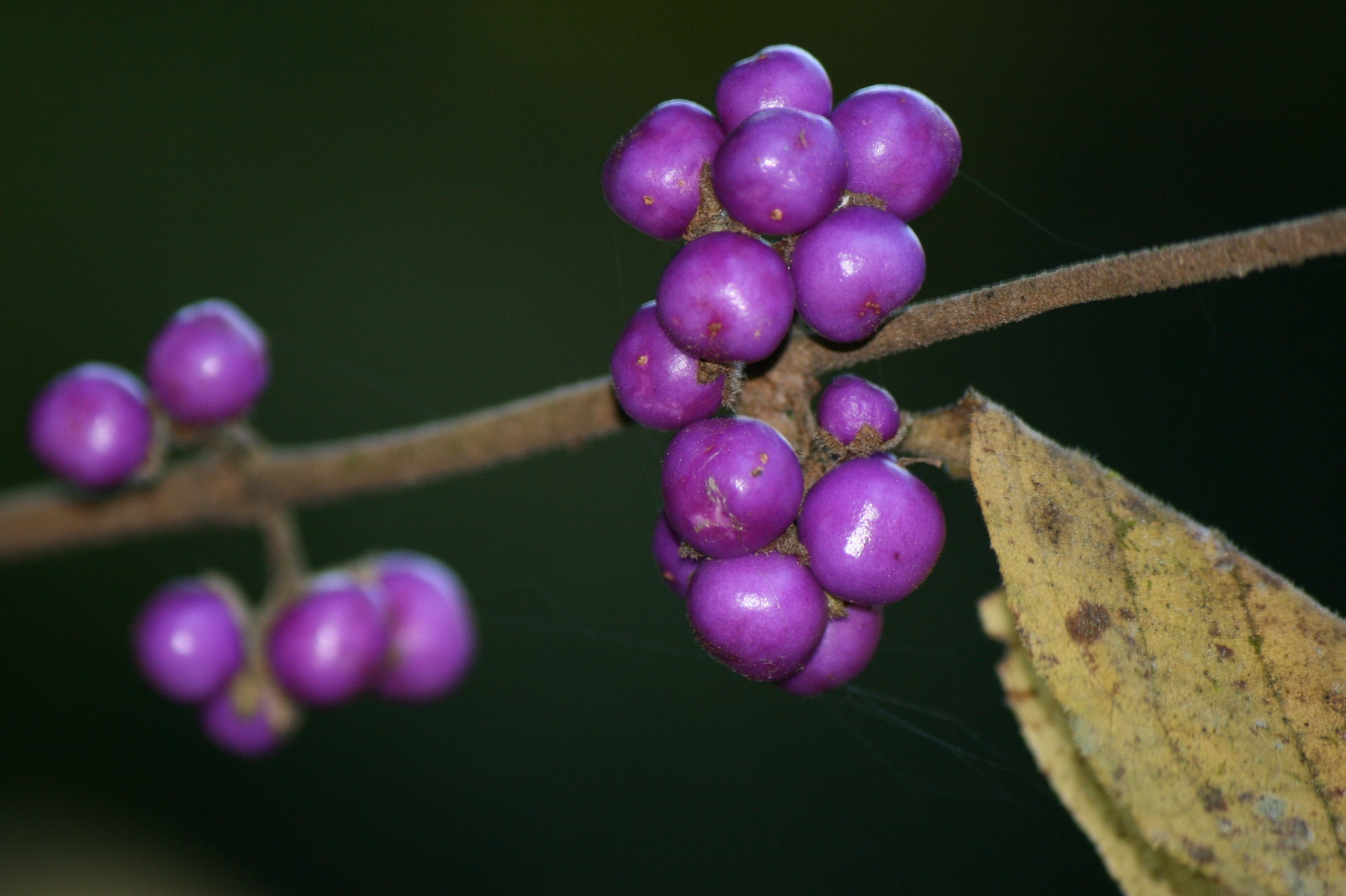

Scientific classification
- Kingdom: Plantae
- Clade: Tracheophytes
- Clade: Angiosperms
- Clade: Eudicots
- Clade: Asterids
- Order: Lamiales
- Family: Lamiaceae
- Genus: Callicarpa
- Species: C. mollis

Binomial name
- Callicarpa mollis Siebold & Zucc.

= Callicarpa mollis =

Species of flowering plant

Callicarpa mollis is a species of beautyberry that is cultivated and grown in gardens and parks as ornamental plant. It has purple flowers. It is found in Korea and Japan.
