= T. campanula =

T. campanula may refer to:

- Tapeinosperma campanula, a plant species
- Trichuris campanula, a roundworm species

== See also ==
- Campanula
