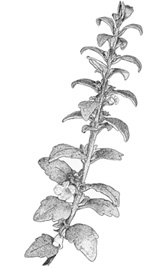

Conservation status
- Endangered (ESA)

Scientific classification
- Kingdom: Plantae
- Clade: Tracheophytes
- Clade: Angiosperms
- Clade: Eudicots
- Clade: Asterids
- Order: Lamiales
- Family: Orobanchaceae
- Genus: Nesogenes
- Species: N. rotensis

Binomial name
- Nesogenes rotensis Fosberg & D.R.Herbst

= Nesogenes rotensis =

Species of flowering plant

Nesogenes rotensis is a rare species of flowering plant in the family Orobanchaceae. It is endemic to Rota, one of the Northern Mariana Islands in the Pacific Ocean. An inhabitant of the commonwealth, it was federally listed as an endangered species of the United States in 2004.

This plant has oppositely arranged lance-shaped leaves and white flowers which occur in the leaf axils. It grows on coastal limestone outcrops with several other plants, including nanaso (Scaevola taccada), talisai ganu (Terminalia samoensis), paodedo (Hedyotis strigulosa), and gausali (Bikkia tetrandra). Little else is known about the plant.

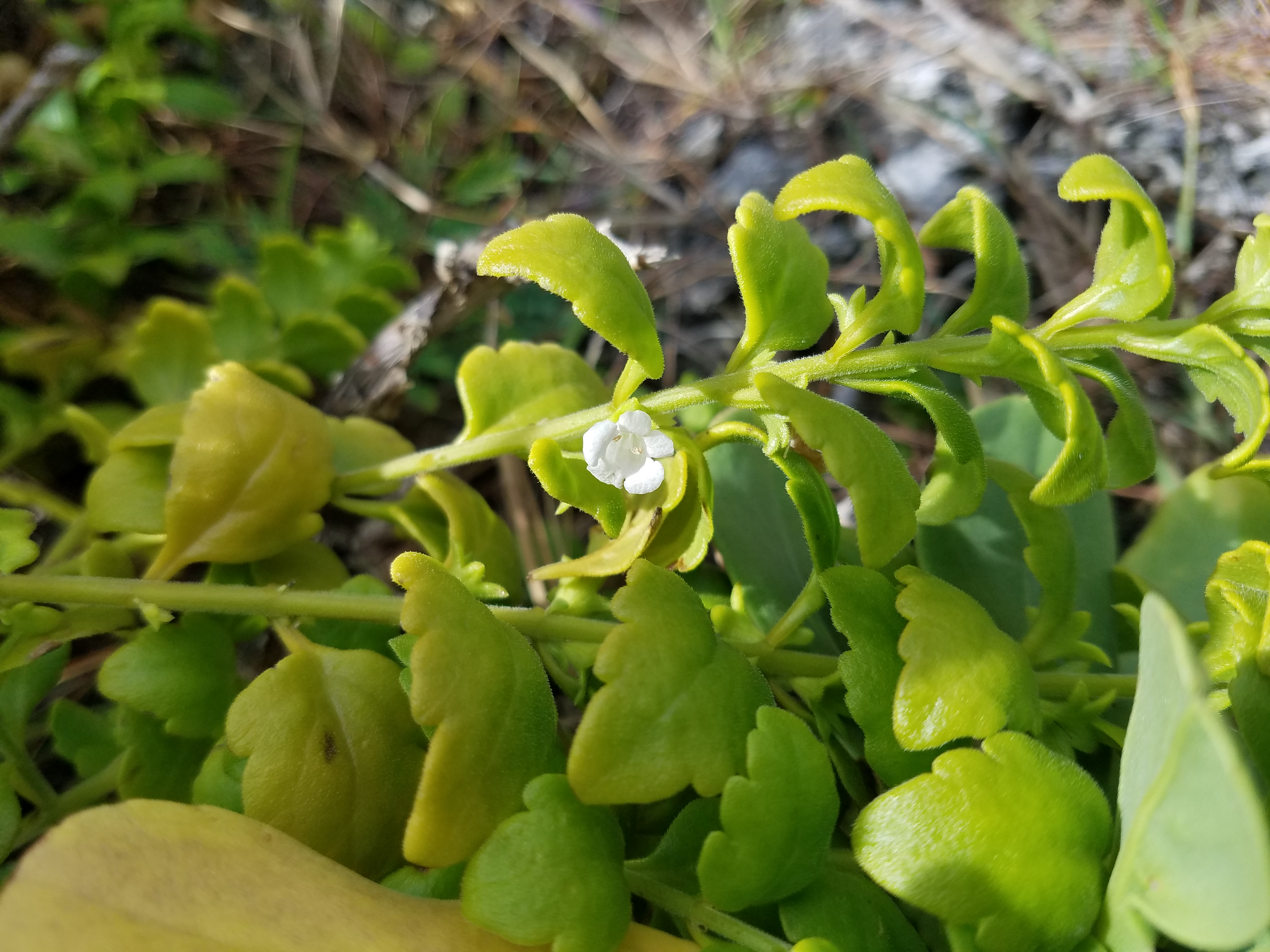
Nesogenes rotensis on Rota

There are two known populations of this plant, which are located at Poña Point and Puntan Fina Atkos on the island of Rota. The former had a total number of 579 individuals in 2001, zero individuals after Typhoon Pongsona swept the area in 2002, and a total of about 20 individuals, including seedlings, in 2005. The second population was discovered in 2005 and had 15 to 20 individuals, including seedlings.

The plant is threatened by the loss and degradation of its habitat due to human activity, including agriculture, development and recreation. The small population size makes the species vulnerable to extinction in the event of a natural disaster, such as a typhoon.

== See also ==
- List of endemic plants in the Mariana Islands
