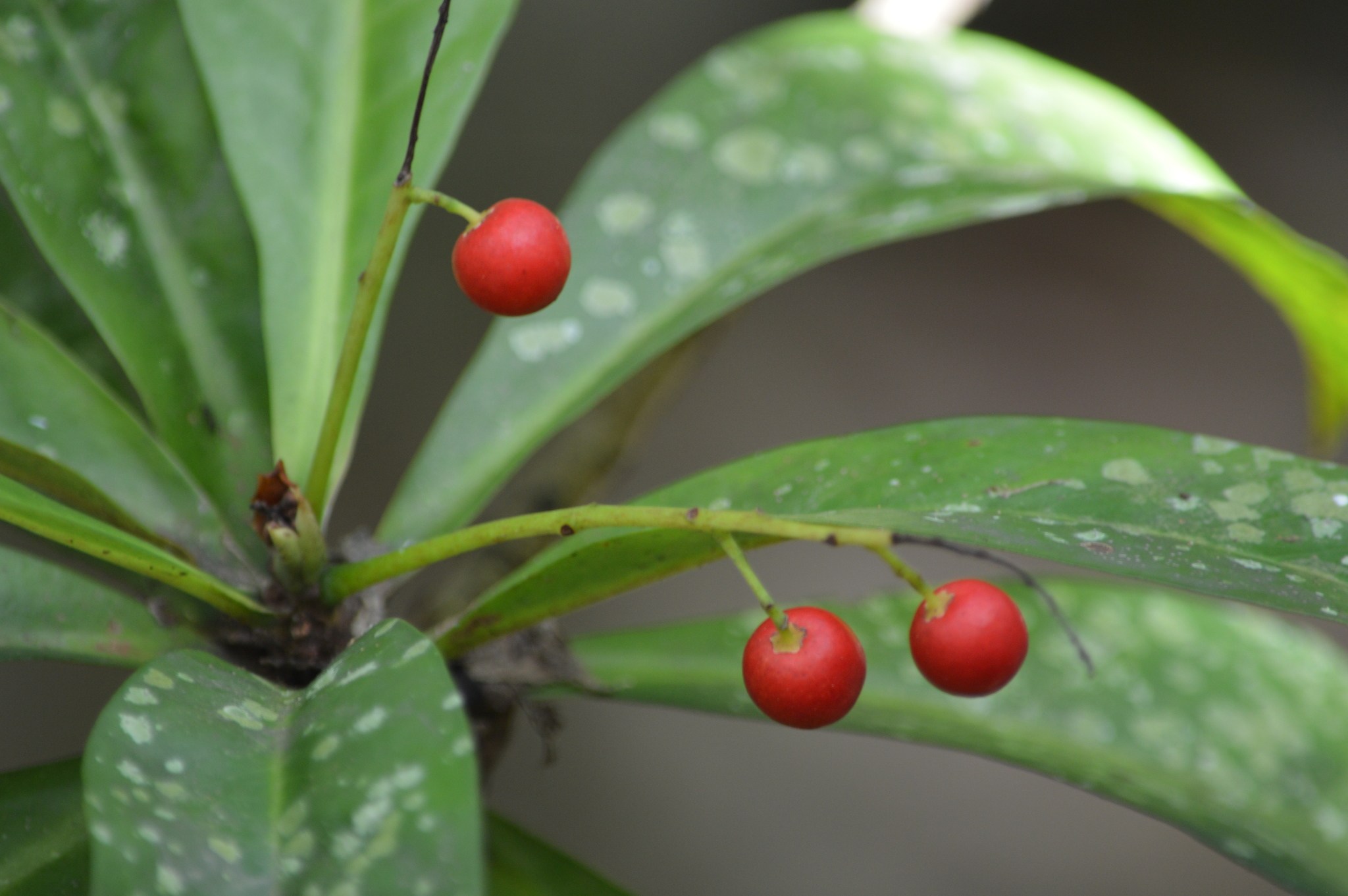
- Leaves and fruits, Rota Island, CNMI

Scientific classification
- Kingdom: Plantae
- Clade: Tracheophytes
- Clade: Angiosperms
- Clade: Eudicots
- Clade: Asterids
- Order: Ericales
- Family: Primulaceae
- Genus: Discocalyx
- Species: D. megacarpa

Binomial name
- Discocalyx megacarpa Merr. (1914)

= Discocalyx megacarpa =

Species of flowering plant

Discocalyx megacarpa (Chamorro: ottot) is a species of plant in the family Primulaceae. It is endemic to Guam and the islands of Rota and Saipan within the Commonwealth of the Northern Mariana Islands. It is an understorey shrub, growing to 2 m tall, with lanceolate green leaves, paniculate, cream-coloured, unisexual flowers, and globose, red fruits each containing a single large ribbed seed.

== See also ==
- List of endemic plants in the Mariana Islands
