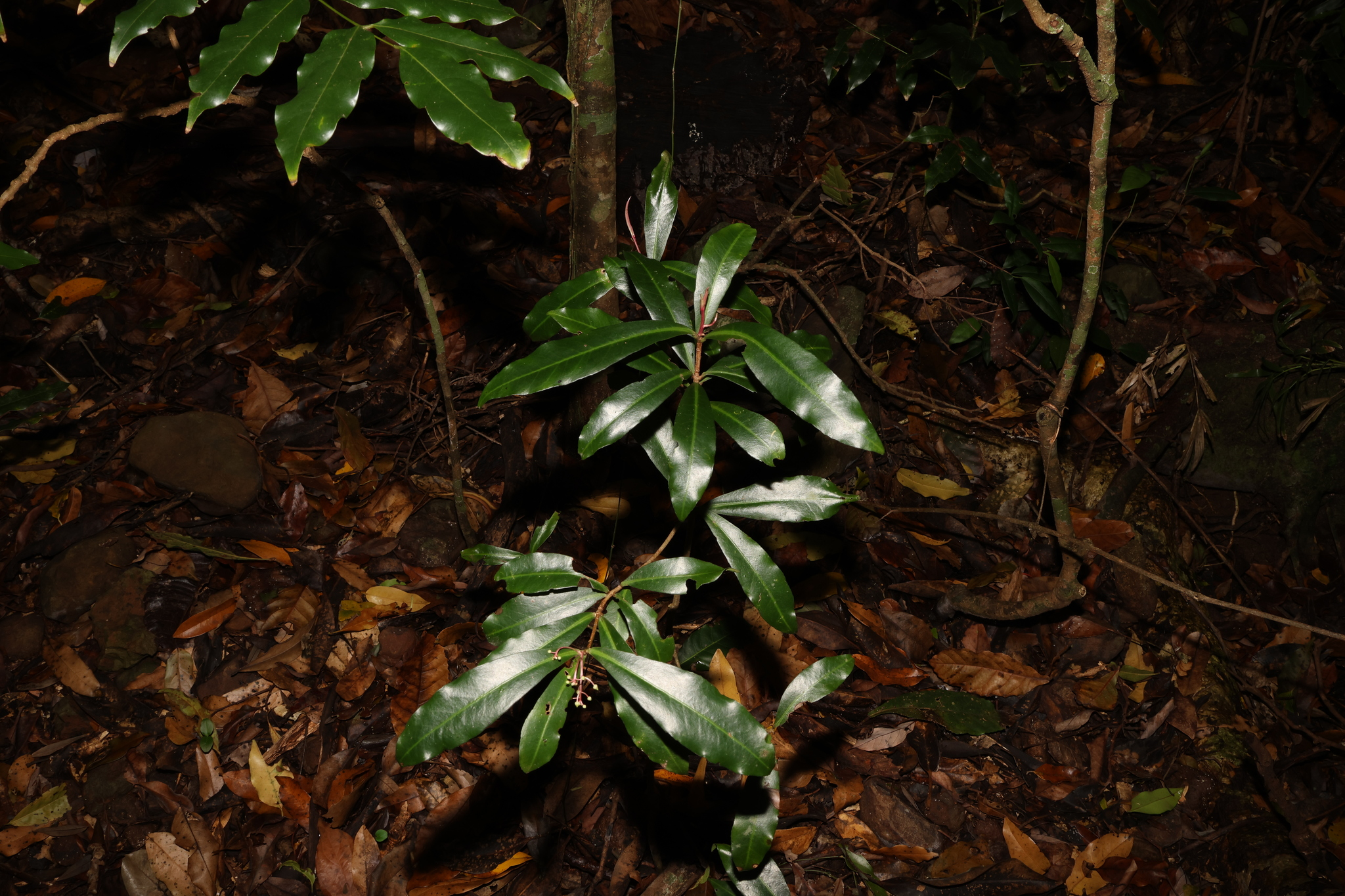
- Tapeinosperma repandulum in Australia

Scientific classification
- Kingdom: Plantae
- Clade: Tracheophytes
- Clade: Angiosperms
- Clade: Eudicots
- Clade: Asterids
- Order: Ericales
- Family: Primulaceae
- Subfamily: Myrsinoideae
- Genus: Tapeinosperma; Hook.f.

= Tapeinosperma =

Genus of flowering plants

Tapeinosperma is a genus of plants in the family Primulaceae (formerly Myrsinaceae). It occurs in Australia, New Guinea, Vanuatu, New Caledonia, Fiji. It is morphologically close to Discocalyx.

== Species ==
As of June 2024, Plants of the World Online accepted the following species:

- Tapeinosperma acutangulum Mez
- Tapeinosperma alatum D.E.Holland & P.F.Stevens
- Tapeinosperma amieuense M.Schmid
- Tapeinosperma amosense Guillaumin
- Tapeinosperma amplexicaule Mez
- Tapeinosperma ampliflorum A.C.Sm.
- Tapeinosperma aragoense Guillaumin
- Tapeinosperma ateouense M.Schmid
- Tapeinosperma babucense Mez
- Tapeinosperma boulindaense M.Schmid
- Tapeinosperma brevipedicellatum M.Schmid
- Tapeinosperma campanula Mez
- Tapeinosperma canalense Guillaumin
- Tapeinosperma capitatum (A.Gray) Mez
- Tapeinosperma chloranthum A.C.Sm.
- Tapeinosperma clavatum Mez
- Tapeinosperma clethroides Mez
- Tapeinosperma colnettianum Guillaumin
- Tapeinosperma commutatum Sleumer
- Tapeinosperma cristobalense B.C.Stone & Whitmore
- Tapeinosperma cuspidatum Sleumer
- Tapeinosperma deflexum Mez
- Tapeinosperma deroinii M.Schmid
- Tapeinosperma divaricatum (Gillespie) A.C.Sm.
- Tapeinosperma ellipticum Mez
- Tapeinosperma filipes B.C.Stone
- Tapeinosperma glandulosum Guillaumin
- Tapeinosperma golonense M.Schmid
- Tapeinosperma gracile Mez
- Tapeinosperma grande (Seem.) Mez
- Tapeinosperma grandiflorum Guillaumin
- Tapeinosperma greenwoodii A.C.Sm.
- Tapeinosperma hornei Mez
- Tapeinosperma kaalaense M.Schmid
- Tapeinosperma kajewskii Guillaumin
- Tapeinosperma koghiense Guillaumin
- Tapeinosperma laeve Mez
- Tapeinosperma laurifolium Mez
- Tapeinosperma lecardii Mez
- Tapeinosperma lenormandii Hook.f.
- Tapeinosperma ligulifolium A.C.Sm.
- Tapeinosperma mackeei M.Schmid
- Tapeinosperma magnifica Pipoly & W.N.Takeuchi
- Tapeinosperma megaphyllum (Hemsl.) Mez
- Tapeinosperma minutum Mez
- Tapeinosperma multiflorum (Gillespie) A.C.Sm.
- Tapeinosperma multipunctatum Guillaumin
- Tapeinosperma nectandroides Mez
- Tapeinosperma nitidum Mez
- Tapeinosperma oblongifolium Mez
- Tapeinosperma pachycaulum B.C.Stone & Whitmore
- Tapeinosperma pallidum Jackes
- Tapeinosperma pancheri Mez
- Tapeinosperma paniense M.Schmid
- Tapeinosperma pauciflorum Mez
- Tapeinosperma pennellii Guillaumin
- Tapeinosperma poueboense M.Schmid
- Tapeinosperma psaladense Mez
- Tapeinosperma pseudojambosa (F.Muell.) Mez
- Tapeinosperma pulchellum Mez
- Tapeinosperma repandulum (F.Muell.) Jackes
- Tapeinosperma robustum Mez
- Tapeinosperma rubidum Mez
- Tapeinosperma rubriscapum Guillaumin
- Tapeinosperma schlechteri Mez
- Tapeinosperma scrobiculatum (Seem.) Mez
- Tapeinosperma sessilifolium Mez
- Tapeinosperma squarrosum Mez
- Tapeinosperma storezii M.Schmid
- Tapeinosperma tchingouense M.Schmid
- Tapeinosperma tenue Mez
- Tapeinosperma veillonii M.Schmid
- Tapeinosperma vestitum Mez
- Tapeinosperma vieillardii Hook.f.
- Tapeinosperma wagapense Mez
- Tapeinosperma whitei Guillaumin
