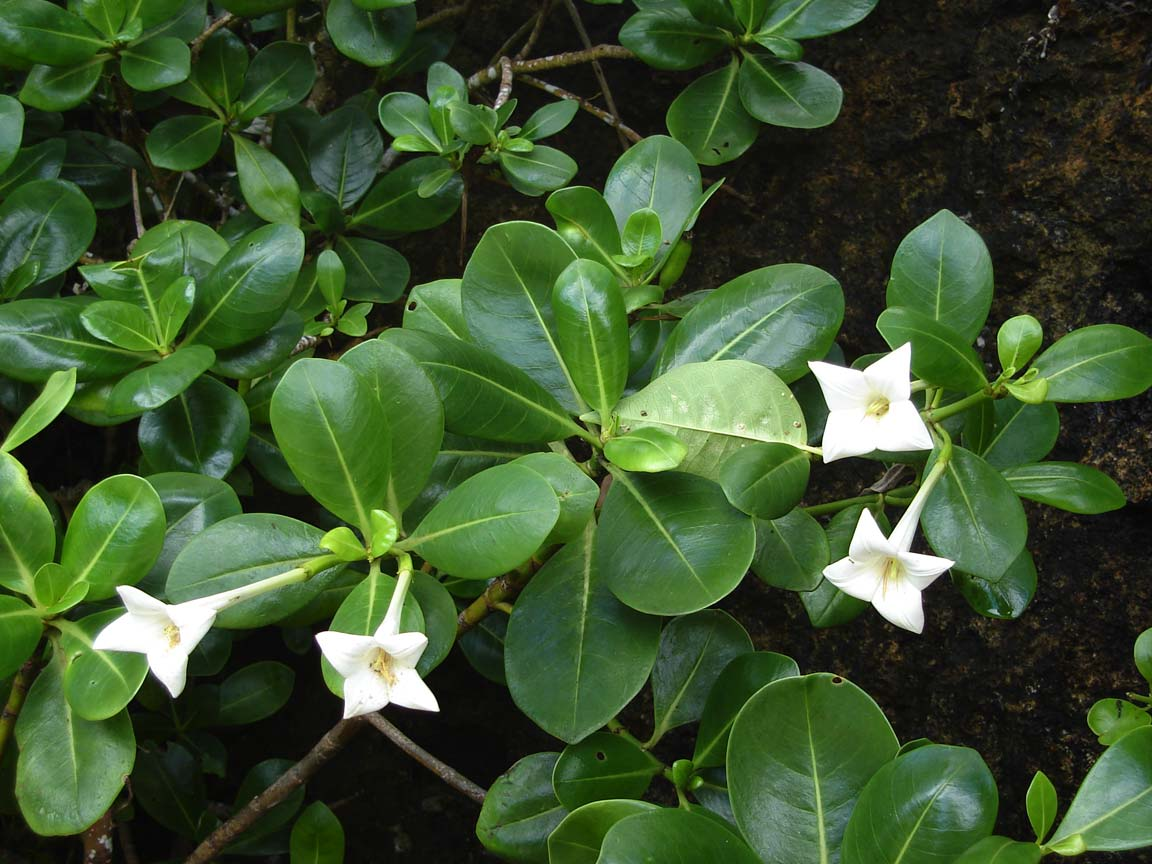
- Bikkia tetrandra

Scientific classification
- Kingdom: Plantae
- Clade: Tracheophytes
- Clade: Angiosperms
- Clade: Eudicots
- Clade: Asterids
- Order: Gentianales
- Family: Rubiaceae
- Subfamily: Cinchonoideae
- Tribe: Chiococceae
- Genus: Bikkia; Reinw. ex Blume

Type species
- Bikkia tetrandra (L.f.) A.Rich.

Synonyms
- Bikkiopsis Brongn. & Gris; Cormigonus Raf.

= Bikkia =

Genus of plants

Bikkia is a genus of flowering plants in the family Rubiaceae. It is native to the Philippines, the Maluku region of eastern Indonesia, New Guinea and the western Pacific (Melanesia and Micronesia). The genus was named by Caspar Reinwardt in 1825. Seven of the New Caledonian species previously included in Bikkia were transferred to a separate genus, Thiollierea, in 2011 based on molecular and morphological information.

== Species ==
- Bikkia bridgeana F.Muell. - New Guinea
- Bikkia commerconiana K.Schum. - New Guinea
- Bikkia gaudichaudiana Brongn. - New Guinea
- Bikkia guilloviana Brongn. - New Guinea
- Bikkia longicarpa Valeton - Mariana Islands
- Bikkia moluccana Suess. ex Troll & Dragend. - Maluku
- Bikkia palauensis Valeton - Palau
- Bikkia pancheri (Brongn.) Guillaumin - Bismarck Archipelago, Solomon Islands, New Caledonia, Vanuatu
- Bikkia philippinensis Valeton - Cebu
- Bikkia tetrandra (L.f.) A.Rich. - New Guinea, Solomon Islands, Fiji, Niue, New Caledonia, Tonga, Vanuatu, Micronesia, Wallis-Futuna Islands
