= Nesogenes =

Scientific classification
- Kingdom: Plantae
- Clade: Tracheophytes
- Clade: Angiosperms
- Clade: Eudicots
- Clade: Asterids
- Order: Lamiales
- Family: Orobanchaceae
- Tribe: Buchnereae
- Genus: Nesogenes; A.DC.

Genus of flowering plants

Nesogenes is a genus of flowering plants belonging to the family Orobanchaceae.

Its native range is Eastern Tropical Africa, Western Indian Ocean, Pacific.

Species:

- Nesogenes africanus G.Taylor
- Nesogenes decumbens Balf.f.
- Nesogenes euphrasioides (Hook. & Arn.) A.DC.
- Nesogenes glandulosus (Scott Elliot) Mildbr.
- Nesogenes madagascariensis (Bonati) Marais
- Nesogenes orerensis (Cordem.) Marais
- Nesogenes prostrata (Benth.) Hemsl.
- Nesogenes rotensis Fosberg & D.R.Herbst
- Nesogenes tenuis (Benth. & Hook.f.) Marais
