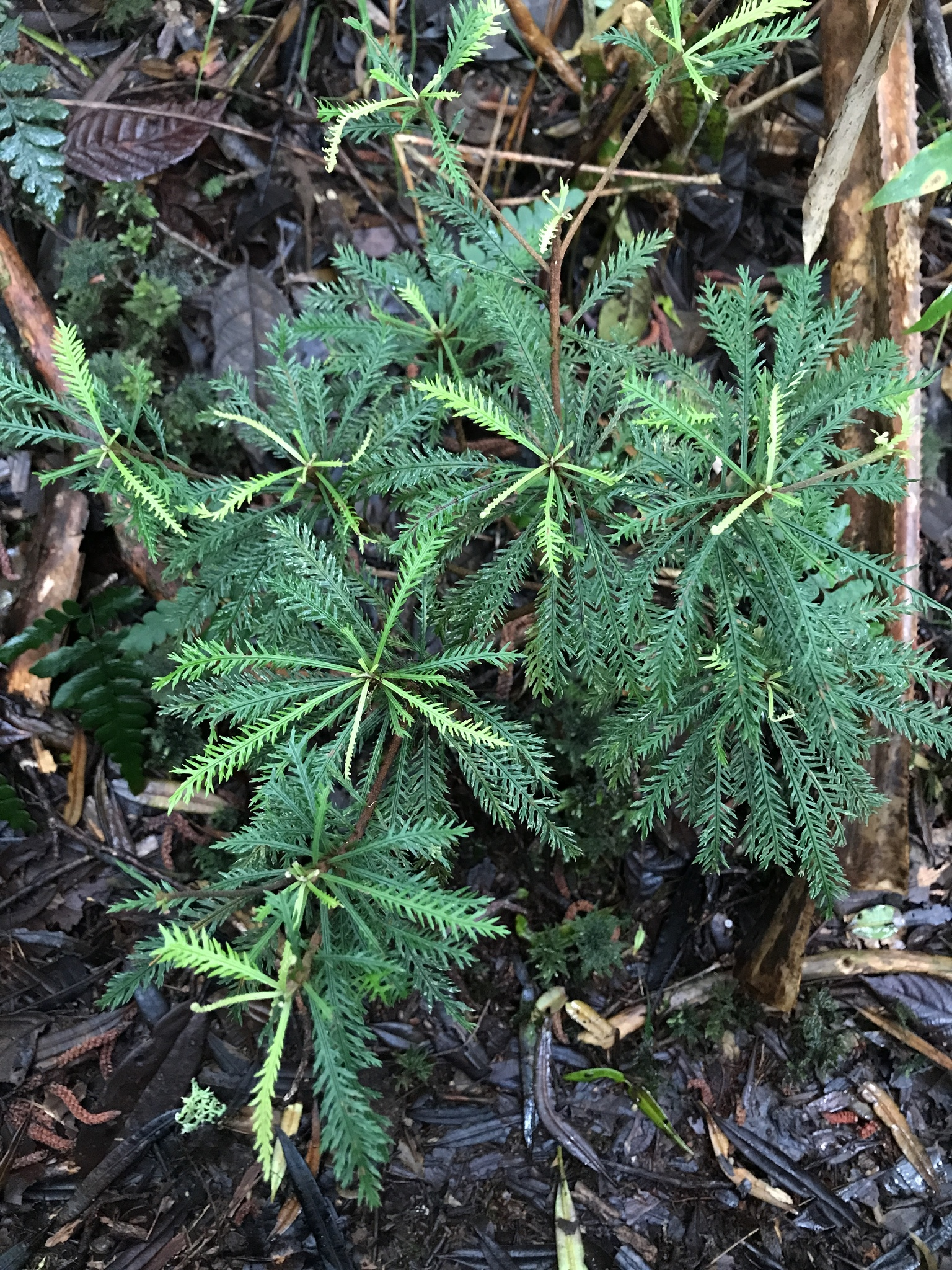
- In Manokwari, Indonesia

Scientific classification
- Kingdom: Plantae
- Clade: Embryophytes
- Clade: Tracheophytes
- Clade: Spermatophytes
- Clade: Angiosperms
- Clade: Eudicots
- Clade: Asterids
- Order: Ericales
- Family: Primulaceae
- Genus: Discocalyx
- Species: D. dissecta

Binomial name
- Discocalyx dissecta Kaneh. & Hatus.

= Discocalyx dissecta =

Species of flowering plant

Discocalyx dissecta is a species of plant in the family Primulaceae. It can be found on the west side of the island of New Guinea and grows in wet tropical habitat.
