= Tapeinosperma pachycaulum =

Scientific classification
- Kingdom: Plantae
- Clade: Tracheophytes
- Clade: Angiosperms
- Clade: Eudicots
- Clade: Asterids
- Order: Ericales
- Family: Primulaceae
- Genus: Tapeinosperma
- Species: T. pachycaulum

Binomial name
- Tapeinosperma pachycaulum B.C.Stone & Whitmore

Species of plant

Tapeinosperma pachycaulum is a palm-like, pachycaul tree historically in the family Myrsinaceae, but now often grouped with the primroses (Primulaceae). It is endemic to the Solomon Islands where it is called Sirikunu. It is a small rainforest tree to 16.5 feet (five meters) in height and only to four inches (ten centimeters) in thickness. It is perhaps most noteworthy for its very large leaves, up to 3 ft 6in (105 centimeters) in length for the lamina (blade), with an additional ten inches (25 cm) for a petiole (stalk) Their width can be up to sixteen inches (41 centimeters). The red or yellow flowers are in dense panicles about eight inches (20 centimeters) long.
