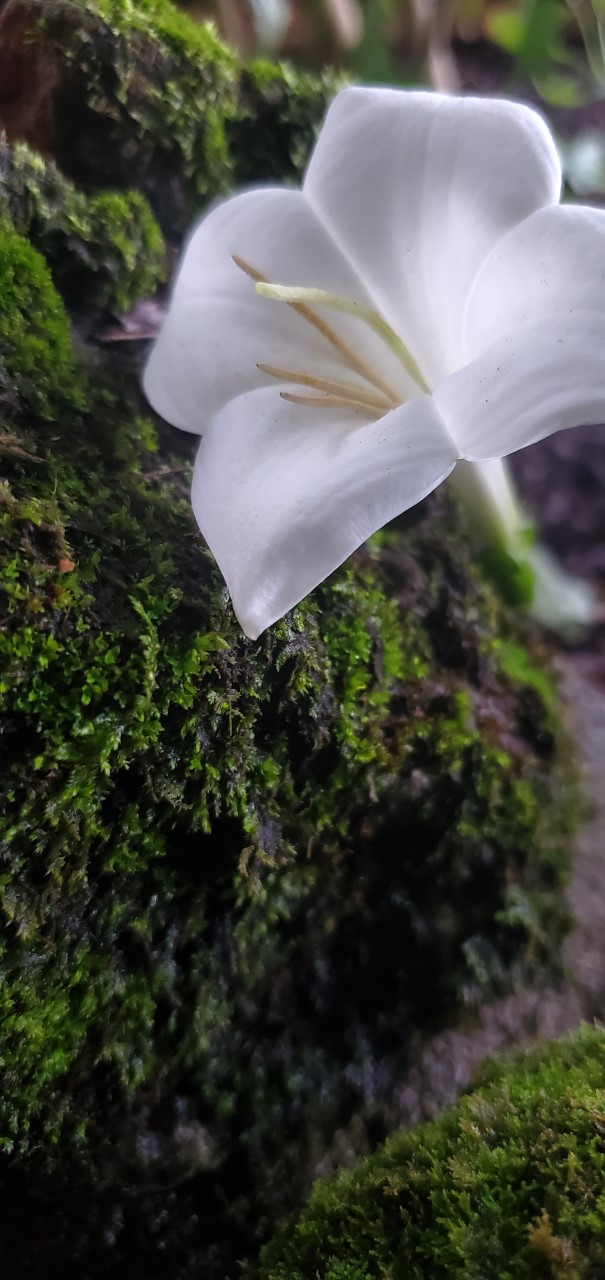

Scientific classification
- Kingdom: Plantae
- Clade: Embryophytes
- Clade: Tracheophytes
- Clade: Spermatophytes
- Clade: Angiosperms
- Clade: Eudicots
- Clade: Asterids
- Order: Gentianales
- Family: Rubiaceae
- Genus: Bikkia
- Species: B. tetrandra

Binomial name
- Bikkia tetrandra (L.f.) A.Rich.

Synonyms
- 15 Synonyms: Bikkia australis DC. (1830); B. australis var. commersoniana DC. (1830); B. australis var. fosteriana DC. (1830); B. comptonii S.Moore (1921); B. forsteriana Brongn. (1866); B. grandiflora Reinw. ex Blume (1825); B. hombroniana Brongn. (1866); B. mariannensis Brongn. (1866); B. tetrandra A.Gray (1860); Bikkiopsis comptonii (S.Moore) Baum.-Bod. (1989); Cormigonus mariannensis (Brongn.) W.Wight (1905); C. tetrandus (L.f.) Kuntze (1891); Hoffmannia amicorum Spreng. (1824); Portlandia tetrandra L.f. (1782); P. tetrandra G.Forst. (1786)

= Bikkia tetrandra =

Species of plant

Bikkia tetrandra (Chamorro: gausåli) is an herbaceous member of the family Rubiaceae, distinguished by its white square-shaped flowers. It is native to Papuasia and islands of the western Pacific, including the Caroline Islands, Fiji, Mariana Islands, New Caledonia, New Guinea, Niue, Solomon Islands, Tonga, Vanuatu, and Wallis-Futuna Islands. The stems ignite easily and can be used to make torches or candles.

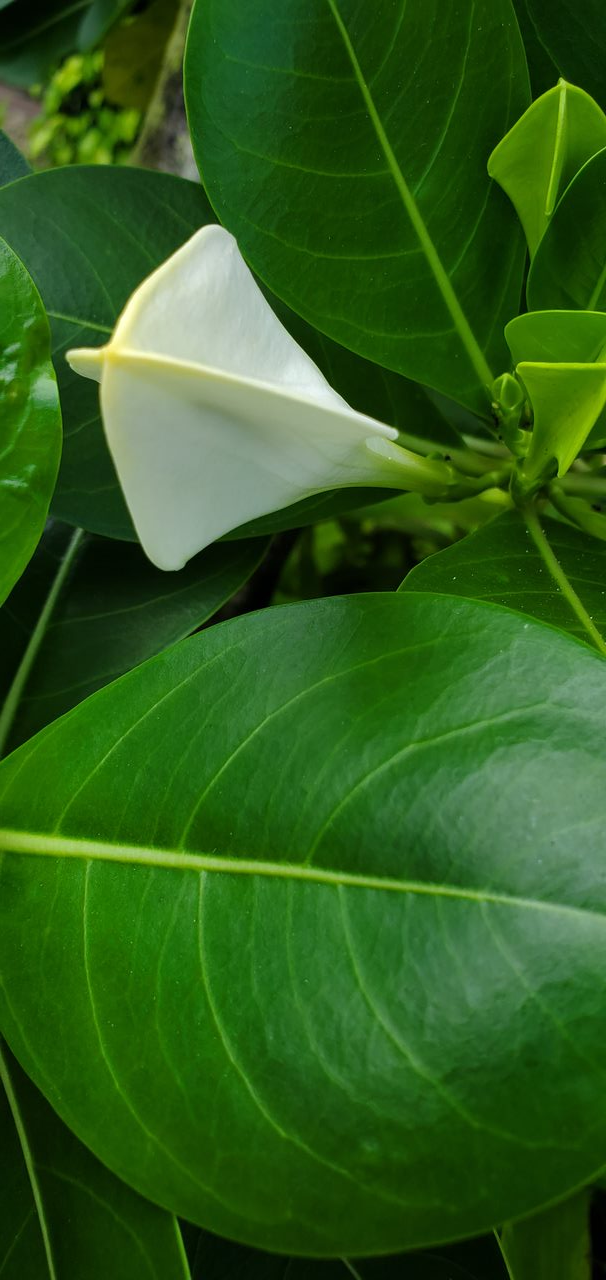
Bikkia tetrandra unopened flower, Guam

Bikkia tetrandra has become a popular symbol of native ecology on the island of Guam. There were two failed legislative proposals on Guam in 2014 and 2018 to make Bikkia tetrandra the official territorial flower. The current territorial flower, the South American Bougainvillea, was introduced to Guam in 1910, where it is now considered invasive.

== Description ==
Form: Grows as an erect, branching shrub on sea-exposed limestone cliffs.

Stem: Pale bark

Leaves: Leaves grow in an opposite arrangement from the tips of branches, with every leaf pair offset from the pair above it and below it. Stipules are D-shaped with a small point. Leaves have short petioles attaching them to the stem. Leaves have no lobes, are glabrous (smooth), obovate (narrower at the base than the tip), with an obtuse angle at the tips. The leaves have a pale midvein.

Flower: Flowers arise from the stem in an axillary arrangement (budding from between the leaf and stem), connected by 1 to a few short pedicels. At the base of the flower is a four-toothed calyx. The white flower has a long tubular shape, expanding out at the end like a trumpet. Petals are squared off. There are four long anthers but they do not extend beyond the flower.

Fruit: 2-celled capsules that are fibrous, woody, and elongated. Seed capsules of Bikkia tetrandra are much larger than other Bikkia species (see illustration for comparison to other Bikkia species, with Bikkia tetrandra (#12) being at a lower magnification than the others).

Seeds: Large number of tiny black seeds.

== History and taxonomy ==
In 1781, the species was first described in the scientific literature and named Portlandia tetrandra by Swedish naturalist, Carl Linnaeus the Younger, based on samples collected from Niue (then known as Savage Island). The species name, tetrandra, indicates the four stamens. This treatment was repeated by Georg Forster in 1786.

The French botanist, Charles Gaudichaud-Beaupré, collected numerous samples of the plant during his voyage to the Pacific from 1817 to 1820. Additional specimens were collected by French naturalists, Jacques Bernard Hombron and Élie Jean François Le Guillou during the 1837–1840 Dumont-d'Urville expedition aboard the Astrolabe.

In 1829, French botanist, M. Achille Richard, changed the name to Bikkia tetrandra and provided his own description. Both Linnaeus (who first described the species) and Richard (who gave the plant its current binomial name), are listed as the botanical authorities: thus "Bikkia tetrandra (L.f.) A.Rich." Richard noted the species to be distinct from the Portlandia genus because of the four parts of various parts of its flower and by the limbs of its calyx having four teeth rather than five deep divisions.

In 1866, the French botanist, Adolphe-Théodore Brongniart, reviewing the numerous specimens from Gaudichaud, Hombron and Le Guillou, proposed splitting the species into five separate species: B. forsteriana from Niue and Solomon Islands, B. mariannensis from Guam, B. guilloviana in New Guinea, B. hombroniana from Tonga, and B. gaudichaudiana from Waigeo, Tahiti, and New Guinea.

In 1919, English botanist, Spencer Le Marchant Moore, wrote that the plants from the Mariana Islands (known at the time as B. mariannensis) differed from the plants from Isle of Pines, New Caledonia (which he called B. comptonii), with the Mariana Islands plants having narrower and thinner leaves, differently shaped calyx segments, a longer corolla and elongated, clavate (hammer-shaped) stigma.

In 1975, French botanist, André Aubréville, examined plants collected from Grand Terre and Isle of Pines in New Caledonia and provided an identification key to the Bikkia genus.

== In popular culture ==
Various common names have been recorded. In 1819, Gaudichaud transliterated the Carolinian word for the plant into French as abamache.

In 1819, Gaudichaud transliterated the Chamorro word for the plant on Guam into French as tchiouti. However, in modern usage, "chiute" is the name for a different species with large white flowers, Cerbera odollam. Safford later recorded the word gausuli in 1905 on Guam. Fosberg also recorded gau sali on Rota in 1993.

Safford reported in 1905 that the wood ignites easily and was used as torches.

== Gallery ==
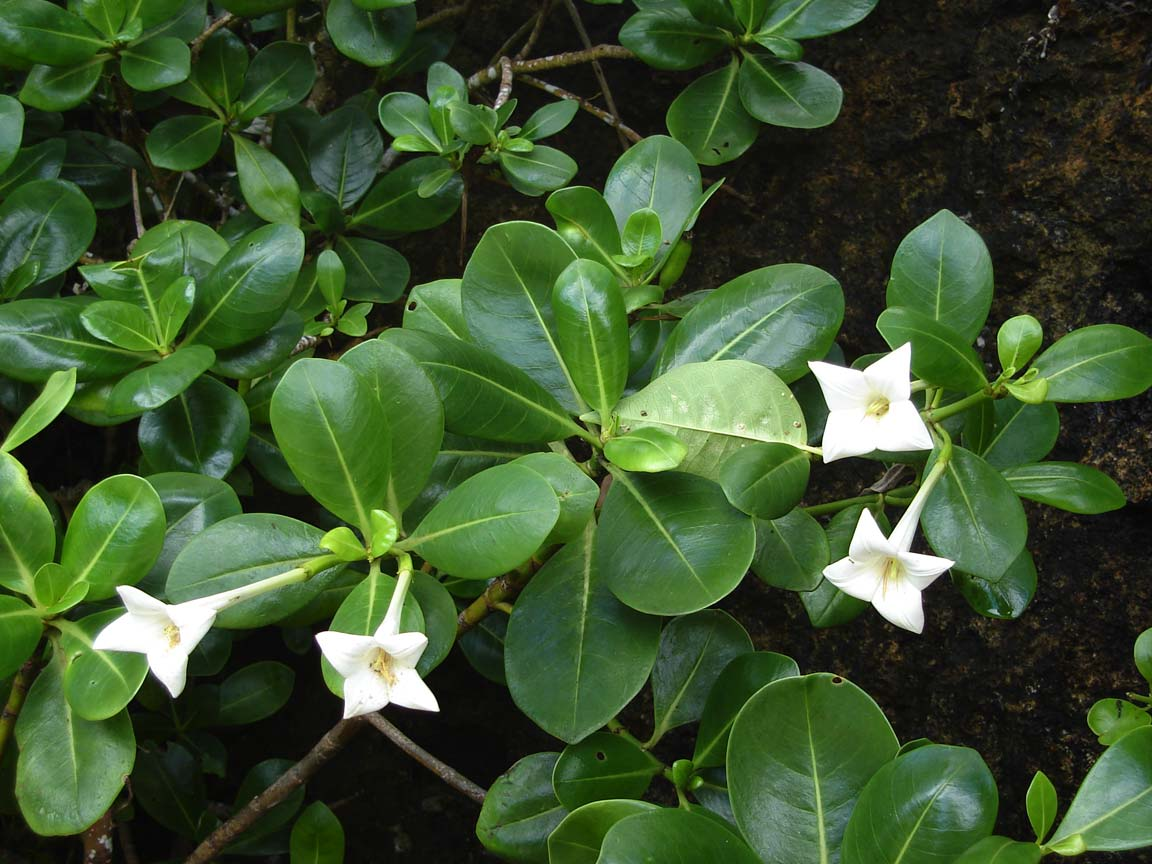
B. tetrandra (siale tafa), Tongatapu, Tonga

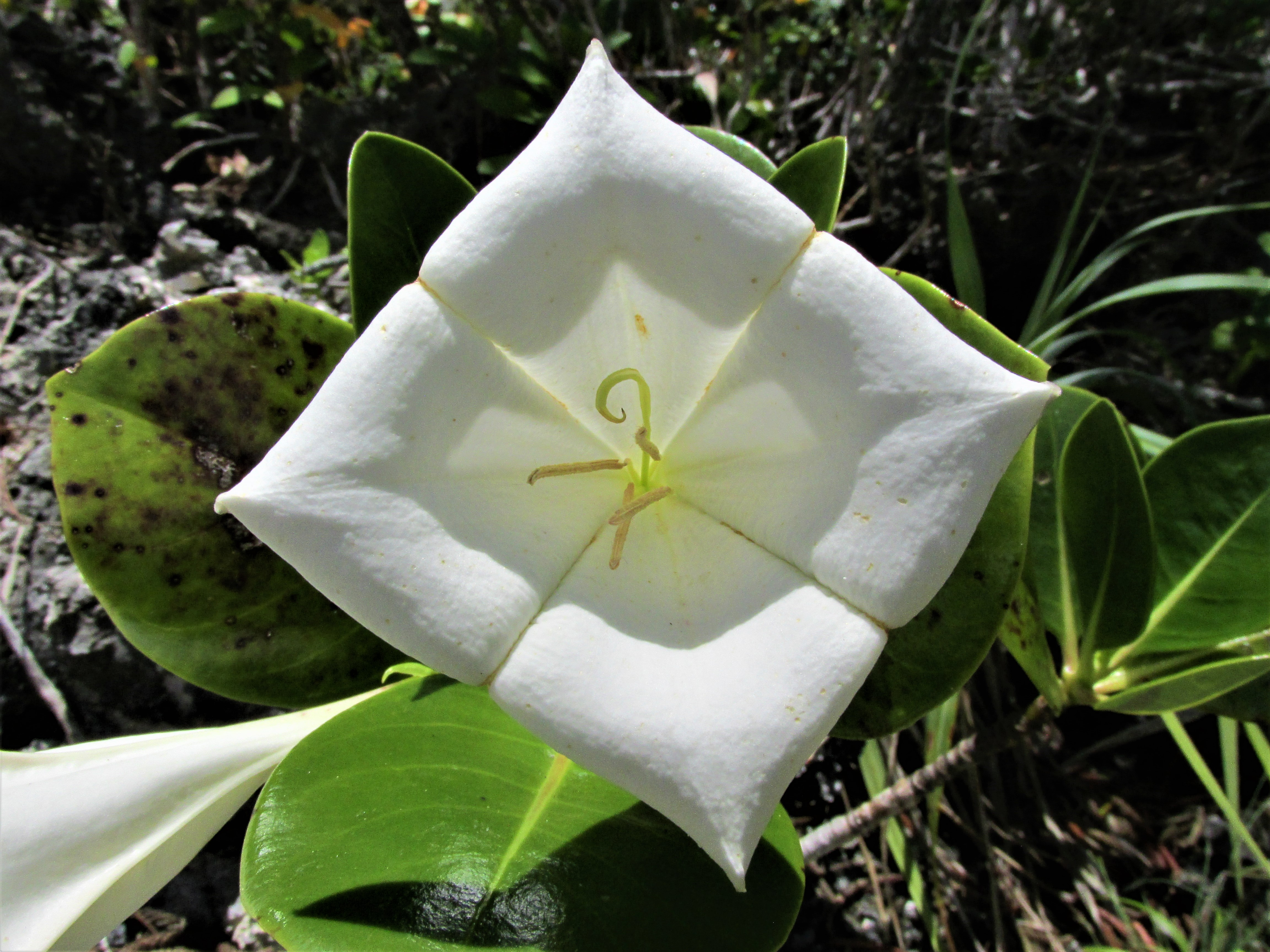
B. tetrandra flower, Isle of Pines, New Caledonia

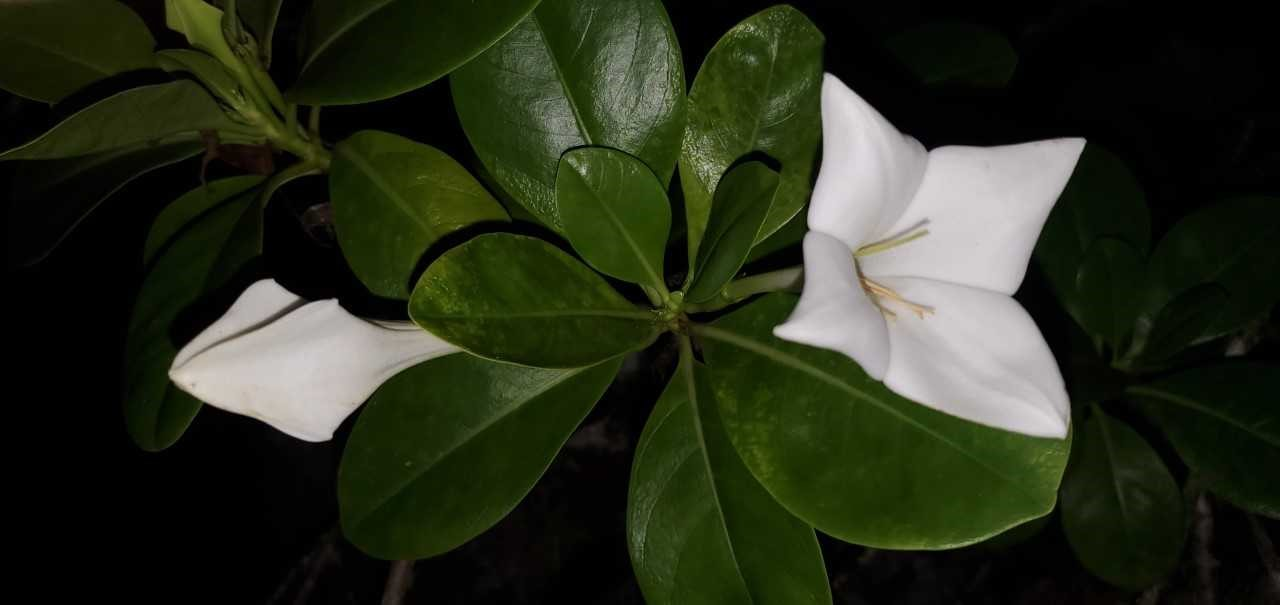
B. tetrandra, Tumon, Guam

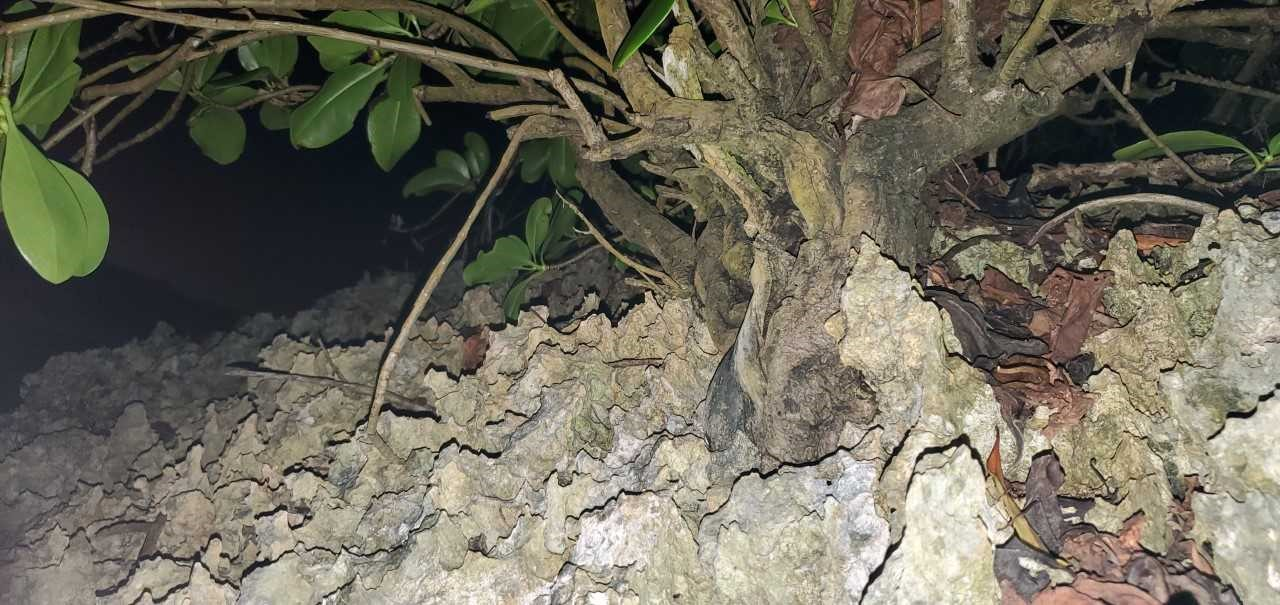
B. tetrandra growing from its typical habitat of karst limestone, Tumon, Guam

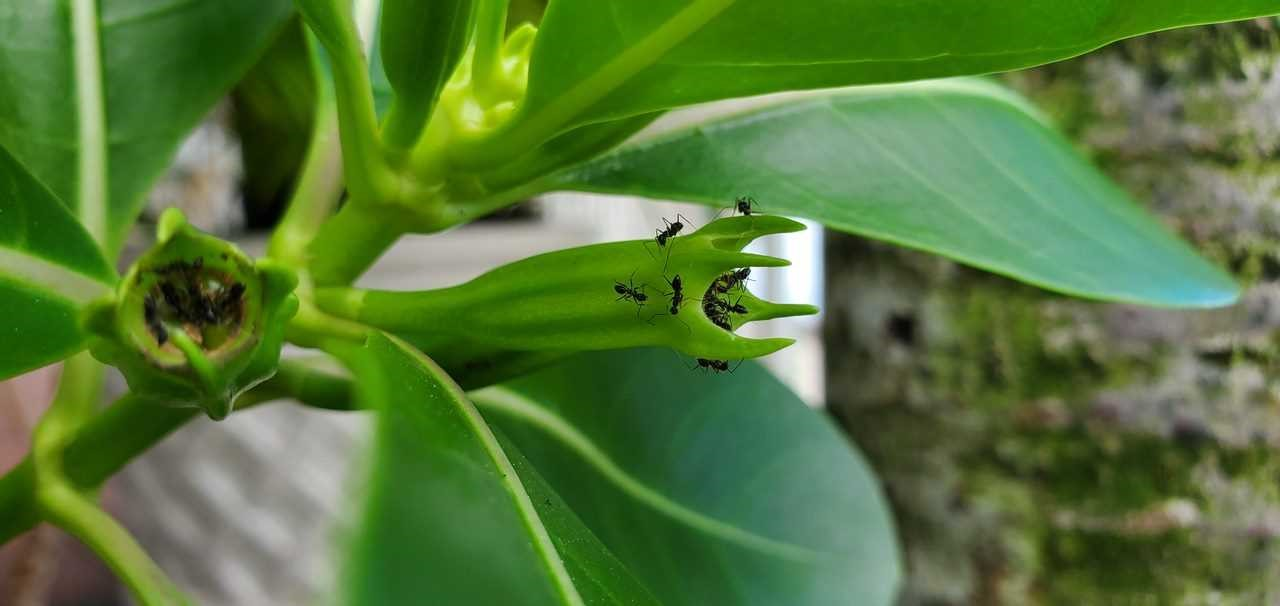
B. tetrandra developing seed capsules, Tumon, Guam

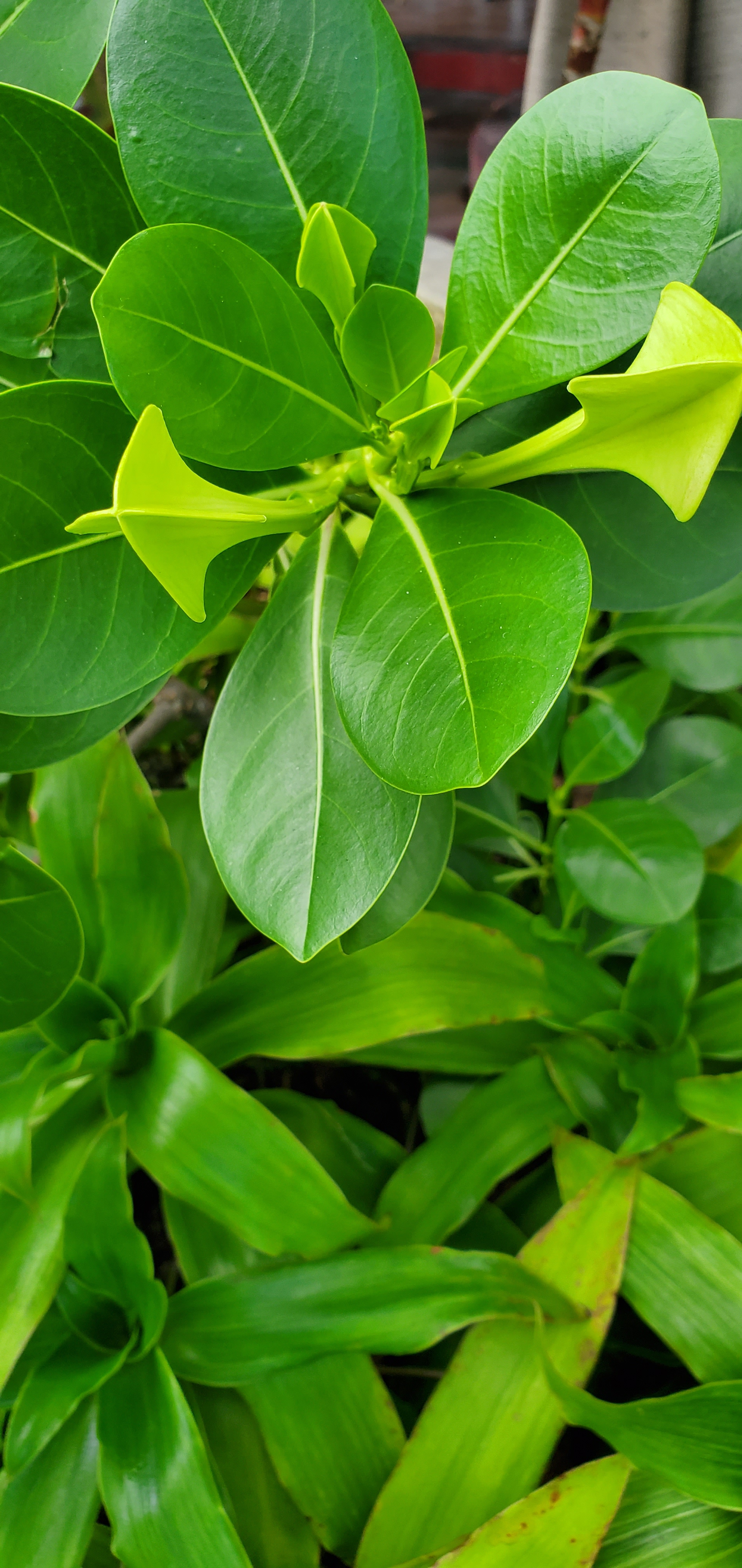
B. tetrandra developing flowers, Guam

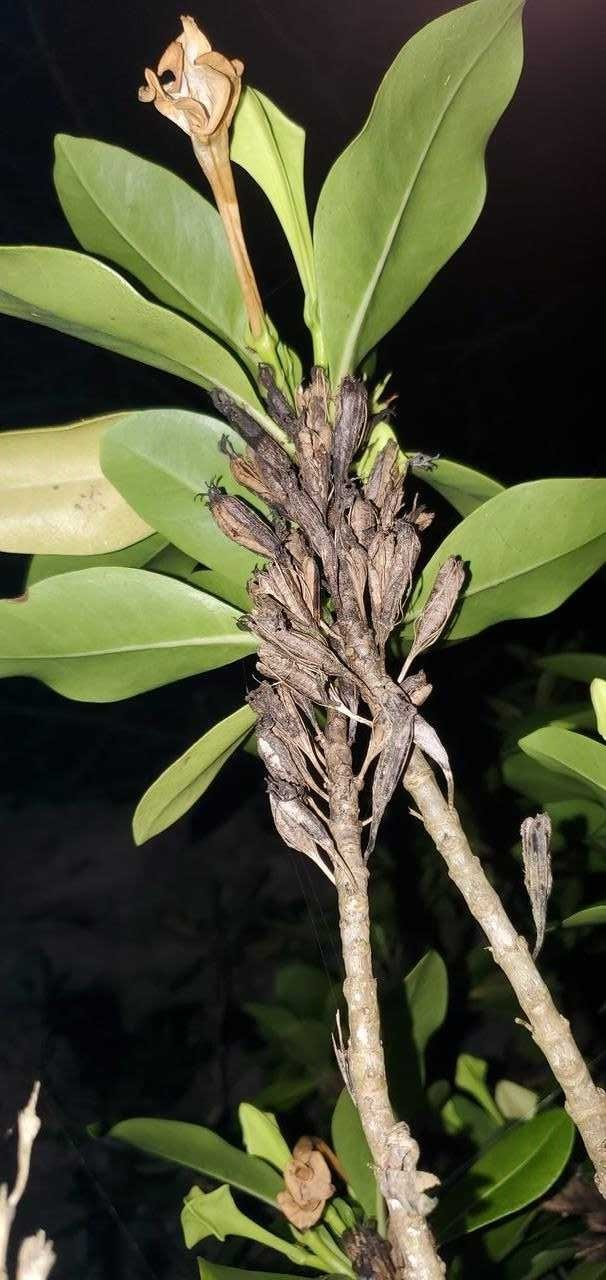
B. tetrandra seed capsules, Tumon, Guam
