= Tapeinosperma campanula =

Conservation status
- Vulnerable (IUCN 2.3)

Scientific classification
- Kingdom: Plantae
- Clade: Embryophytes
- Clade: Tracheophytes
- Clade: Angiosperms
- Clade: Eudicots
- Clade: Asterids
- Order: Ericales
- Family: Primulaceae
- Genus: Tapeinosperma
- Species: T. campanula

Binomial name
- Tapeinosperma campanula Mez

Species of flowering plant

Tapeinosperma campanula is a species of flowering plant in the family Primulaceae. It is endemic to New Caledonia.
