= Discocalyx =

Scientific classification
- Kingdom: Plantae
- Clade: Tracheophytes
- Clade: Angiosperms
- Clade: Eudicots
- Clade: Asterids
- Order: Ericales
- Family: Primulaceae
- Subfamily: Myrsinoideae
- Genus: Discocalyx (A.DC.) Mez

Genus of plants

Discocalyx is a genus of flowering plants belonging to the family Primulaceae.

Its native range is Philippines to Western Pacific.

Species:

- Discocalyx albiflora Sleumer
- Discocalyx amplifolia A.C.Sm.
- Discocalyx angustifolia Mez
- Discocalyx angustissima Merr.
- Discocalyx brachybotrya Merr.
- Discocalyx brassii Sleumer
- Discocalyx crinita A.C.Sm.
- Discocalyx cybianthoides (A.DC.) Mez
- Discocalyx dissecta Kaneh. & Hatus.
- Discocalyx effusa Mez
- Discocalyx euphlebia Merr.
- Discocalyx filipes Mez
- Discocalyx fusca Gibbs
- Discocalyx hymenandroides Mez
- Discocalyx insignis Merr.
- Discocalyx kaoyae Pipoly & Takeuchi
- Discocalyx ladronica Mez
- Discocalyx latepetiolata (Mez) Sleumer
- Discocalyx leytensis Merr.
- Discocalyx linearifolia Elmer
- Discocalyx listeri (Stapf) Mez & Stapf
- Discocalyx longifolia Merr.
- Discocalyx longissima Merr.
- Discocalyx luzoniensis Merr.
- Discocalyx macrophylla Merr.
- Discocalyx maculata Merr.
- Discocalyx megacarpa Merr.
- Discocalyx merrillii Mez
- Discocalyx mezii Hosok.
- Discocalyx micrantha Merr.
- Discocalyx mindanaensis Elmer
- Discocalyx minor Mez
- Discocalyx montana Elmer
- Discocalyx orthoneura K.Schum.
- Discocalyx pachyphylla Merr.
- Discocalyx palauensis Hosok.
- Discocalyx palawanensis Elmer ex Merr.
- Discocalyx papuana Kaneh. & Hatus.
- Discocalyx perseifolia Mez
- Discocalyx phanerophlebia Merr.
- Discocalyx philippinensis (A.DC.) Mez
- Discocalyx ponapensis Mez
- Discocalyx psychotrioides Elmer
- Discocalyx pygmaea Kaneh. & Hatus.
- Discocalyx samarensis Merr.
- Discocalyx sarcophylla Sleumer
- Discocalyx schlechteri K.Schum.
- Discocalyx sessilifolia Merr.
- Discocalyx silvestris Holthuis
- Discocalyx stenophylla Merr.
- Discocalyx subsinuata Sleumer
- Discocalyx suluensis Merr.
- Discocalyx tecsonii Merr.
- Discocalyx vidalii Mez
- Discocalyx xiphophylla Quisumb. & Merr.
