= Rota, Northern Mariana Islands =

Political division of the Northern Mariana Islands

Rota
Native name: Luta
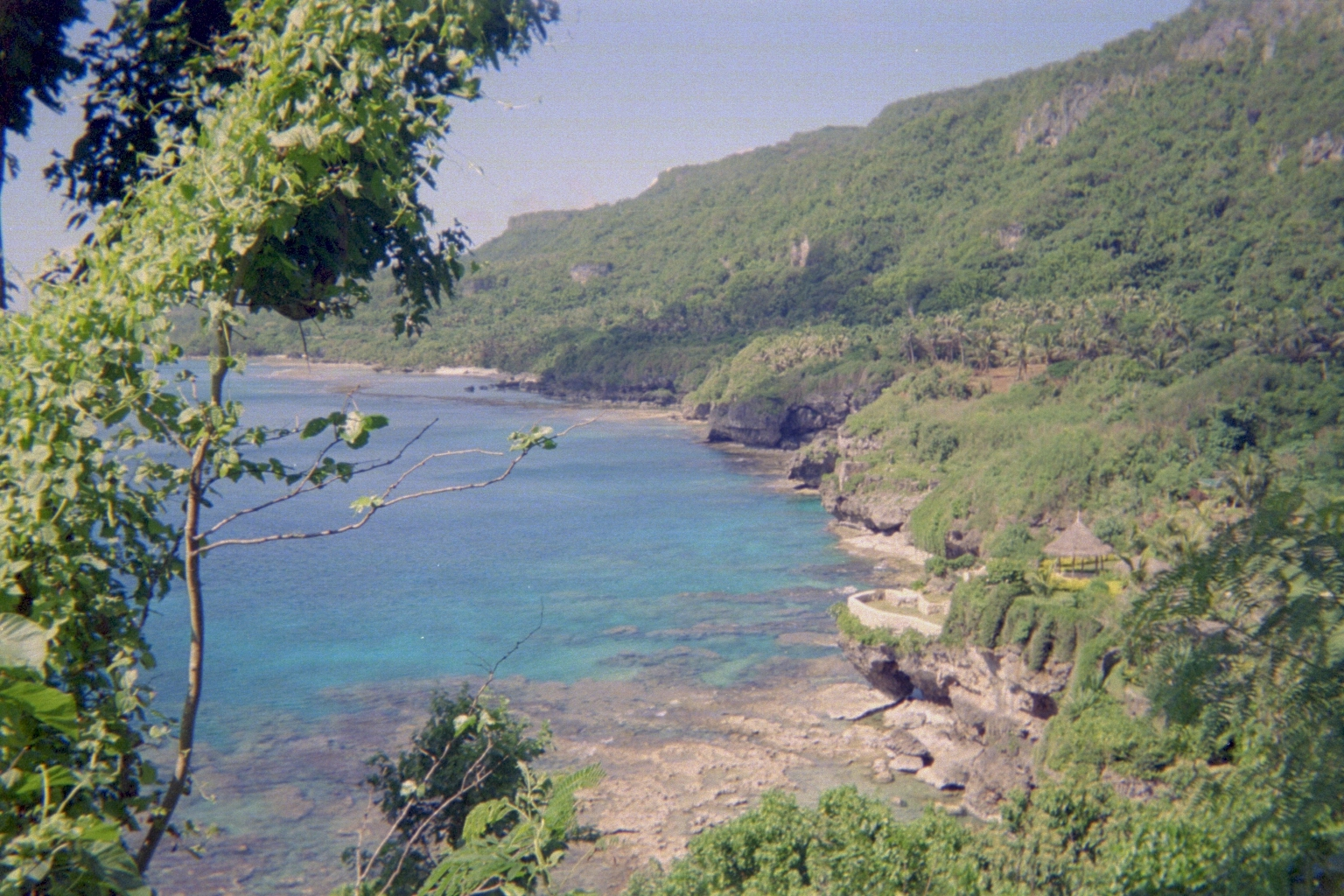
- Rota Island in Northern Mariana Islands

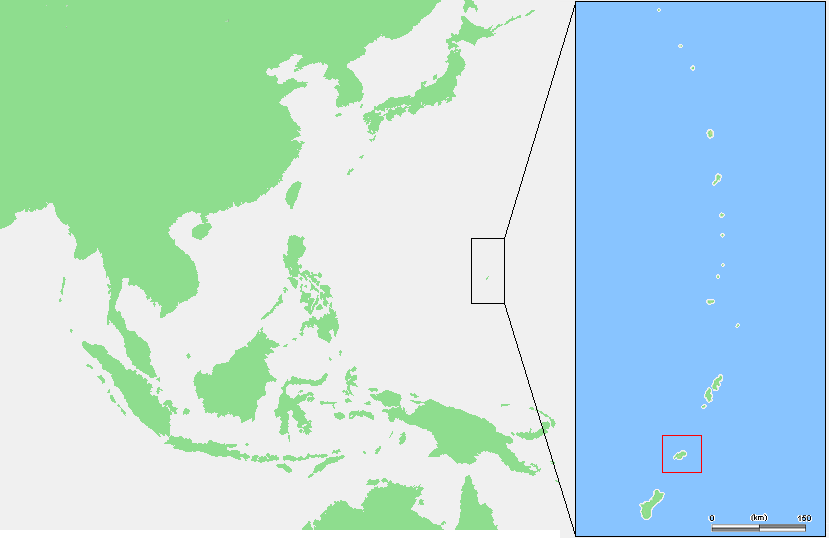
- Map showing location of Rota in the western Pacific Ocean

Geography
- Location: Pacific Ocean
- Coordinates: 14°09′13″N 145°12′11″E
- Archipelago: Marianas
- Area: 85.13 km^{2} (32.87 sq mi)
- Length: 19 km (11.8 mi)
- Width: 8 km (5 mi)
- Highest elevation: 495 m (1624 ft)
- Highest point: Mount Manira

Administration
- United States
- Commonwealth: Northern Mariana Islands

Demographics
- Population: 1,893 (2020)

Rota (Chamorro: Luta), also known as the "Friendly Island", is the southernmost island of the United States Commonwealth of the Northern Mariana Islands (CNMI) and the third southernmost of the Marianas Archipelago (the first being Cocos Island). Early Spanish records called it Zarpana; the name Rota may have come from the Andalusian municipality of Rota. It lies approximately 40 nautical miles (74 km) north-northeast of the separately administered United States territory of Guam. Sinapalo village is the largest and most populated, followed by Songsong village. Rota functions as one of the four municipalities of the CNMI.

== History ==
In 1521, the first European to see Rota was the lookout on Ferdinand Magellan's ship Victoria, Lope Navarro. However, Magellan's armada of three ships did not stop until they reached Guam, so the first European to arrive in Rota (in 1524), was the Spanish navigator Juan Sebastián Elcano, who annexed it together with the rest of the Mariana Islands on behalf of the Spanish Empire.

As with the other islands of the northern Marianas, Rota was sold to the German Empire under the German–Spanish Treaty of 1899. In World War I, the islands were occupied by the Empire of Japan. In 1919, the League of Nations formally recognized Japanese control under the South Seas Mandate. However, development of Rota lagged behind that of neighboring Tinian and Saipan, with only 1000 Japanese residents arriving by the end of December 1935, most of them employed in raising sugar cane and in sugar refining. The refinery was not economical, and it was closed three years later.

The Japanese garrison during World War II consisted of 1,031 Imperial Japanese Army men of the 10th Independent Mixed Brigade, under the command of Major Shigeo Imagawa, and about 600 Imperial Japanese Navy men. During the final stages of the war, Rota was occasionally bombed by aircraft of the U.S. Navy in an attempt to silence its radio transmitter that was providing warning to the Japanese home islands upon the take-off of B-29 Superfortress bomber attacks from Tinian, Saipan, and Guam, but the island was never invaded by American troops. B-29 bombers on Guam would use Rota to dump their bombs if they had mechanical issues and needed to turn back during a raid on Japan. On September 2, 1945, one hour after the surrender of Japan, a detachment of U.S. Marines arrived on Rota to accept the surrender of the Japanese garrison, which numbered 947 Imperial Japanese Army and 1853 Imperial Japanese Navy.

After the end of World War II, Rota became part of the Trust Territory of the Pacific Islands. Since 1978, the island has been a part of the Commonwealth of the Northern Mariana Islands.

The current mayor is Aubry M. Hocog.

In the 21st century, tourism is popular on the island, with a variety of natural, historic, and marine sites. One noted tourist attraction and natural wonder is the "swimming hole", which is small naturally formed pool of sea water by the coast.

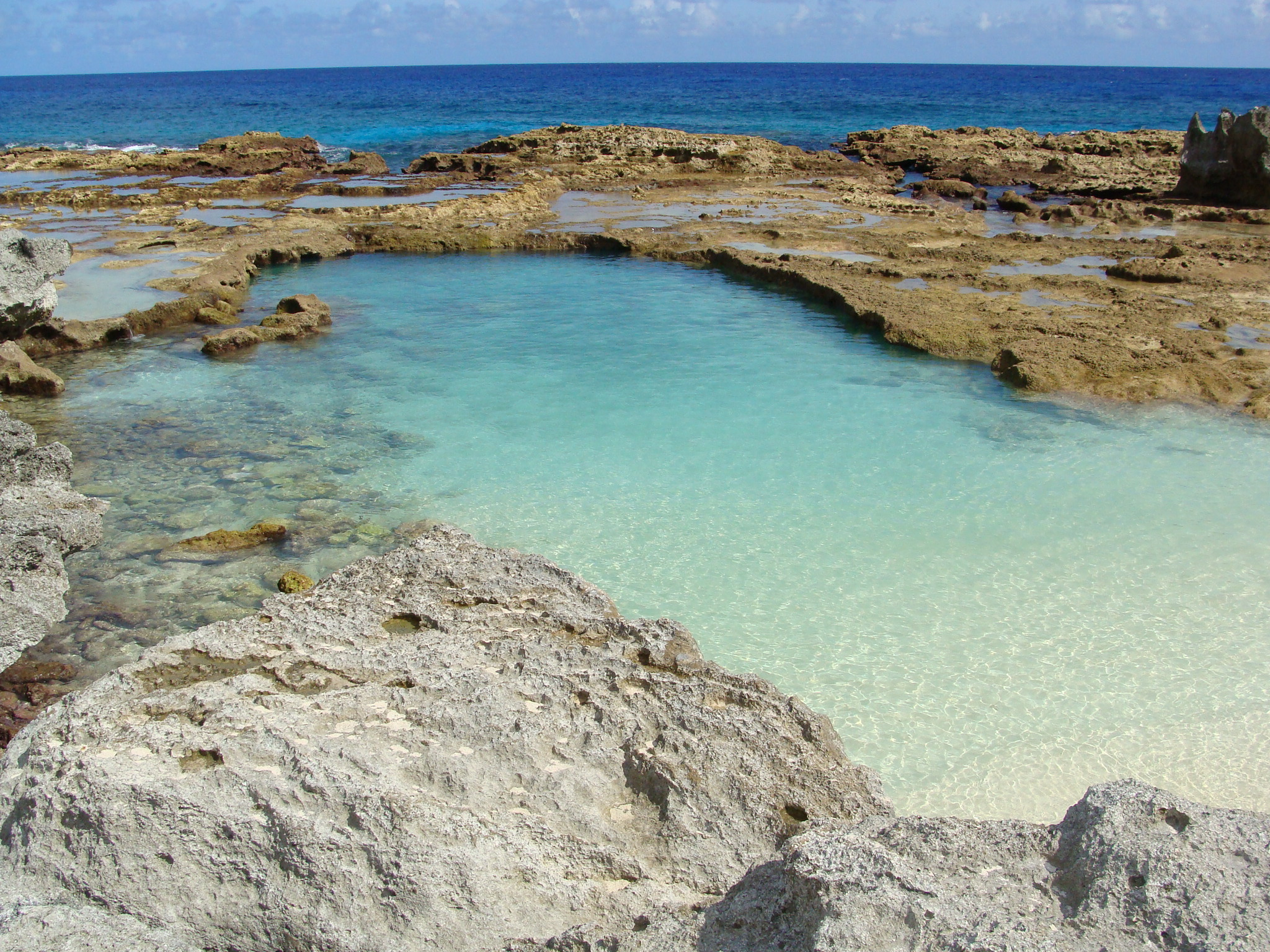
Rota's natural seawater swimming pool, the swimming hole

== Geography ==
Rota is 12.3 miles (19.8 km) long and 4.2 mi (6.8 km) wide. Its coastline is about 38 mi (61 km) long. The highest point on Rota is Mt. Sabana which is 495.56 meters (1,625.9 ft). Rota is 47 nmi (87 km) north of Guam, 63 nmi (117 km) south of Tinian and 73 nmi (135 km) south of Saipan.

=== Ecology ===
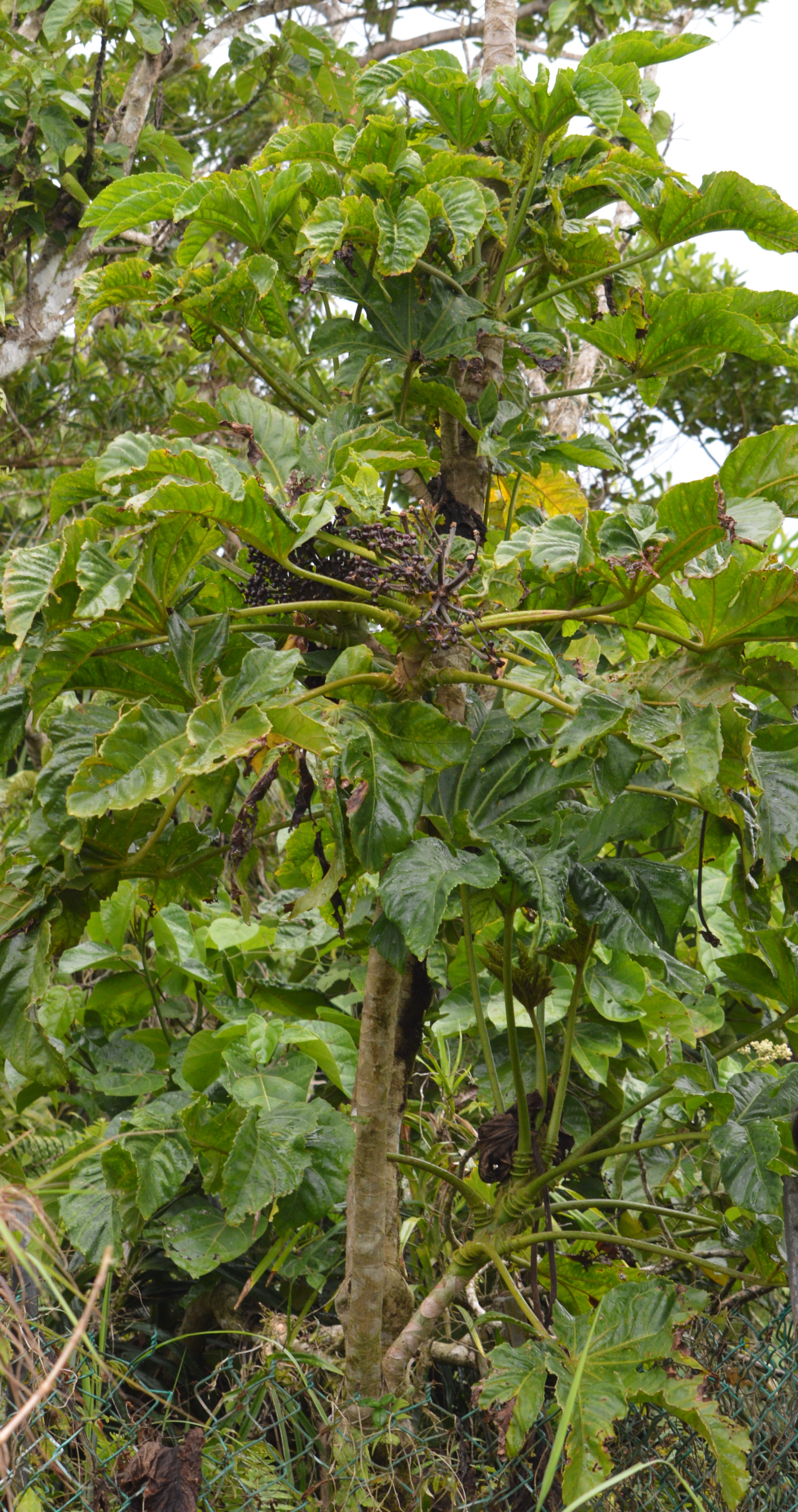
Osmoxylon mariannense, one of five plant species that are endemic only to the island of Rota.

Rota has diverse flora and fauna including the endemic and endangered Rota white-eye, Mariana crow, and Mariana fruit bat. Much of the island, especially where there are remnants of native forest, have been recognised as forming an Important Bird Area (IBA) by BirdLife International. Four wildlife conservations areas have been designated on Rota: Mariana Crow Conservation Area, Sabana Protected Area, I'Chenchon Park Wildlife Conservation Area, and Liyo Conservation Area. There are five plant species or subspecies that are endemic only to the island of Rota, including the critically endangered Osmoxylon mariannense and the endangered Nesogenes rotensis.

=== Climate ===
Climate data for Rota Airport (1991–2020 normals, extremes 1993–present)
Month	Jan	Feb	Mar	Apr	May	Jun	Jul	Aug	Sep	Oct	Nov	Dec	Year
Record high °F (°C)	89 (32)	89 (32)	89 (32)	89 (32)	90 (32)	94 (34)	91 (33)	91 (33)	96 (36)	90 (32)	90 (32)	89 (32)	96 (36)
Mean daily maximum °F (°C)	83.6 (28.7)	83.5 (28.6)	84.3 (29.1)	85.1 (29.5)	86.3 (30.2)	87.1 (30.6)	86.7 (30.4)	85.9 (29.9)	86.1 (30.1)	86.1 (30.1)	85.8 (29.9)	84.8 (29.3)	85.4 (29.7)
Daily mean °F (°C)	78.9 (26.1)	78.6 (25.9)	79.3 (26.3)	80.1 (26.7)	81.2 (27.3)	81.8 (27.7)	81.2 (27.3)	80.5 (26.9)	80.6 (27.0)	80.8 (27.1)	80.8 (27.1)	80.2 (26.8)	80.3 (26.8)
Mean daily minimum °F (°C)	74.2 (23.4)	73.7 (23.2)	74.2 (23.4)	75.1 (23.9)	76.0 (24.4)	76.6 (24.8)	75.7 (24.3)	75.2 (24.0)	75.1 (23.9)	75.5 (24.2)	75.9 (24.4)	75.5 (24.2)	75.2 (24.0)
Record low °F (°C)	63 (17)	61 (16)	64 (18)	69 (21)	66 (19)	65 (18)	57 (14)	64 (18)	64 (18)	63 (17)	69 (21)	67 (19)	57 (14)
Average precipitation inches (mm)	5.66 (144)	4.76 (121)	3.45 (88)	3.65 (93)	3.73 (95)	5.41 (137)	9.86 (250)	14.15 (359)	15.04 (382)	13.88 (353)	7.49 (190)	5.35 (136)	92.43 (2,348)
Average precipitation days (≥ 0.01 in)	19.4	16.8	15.5	17.2	18.4	20.2	25.3	24.4	25.2	25.3	22.8	20.7	251.2
Source: NOAA

== Transportation ==
Rota has an airport, Rota International Airport. From here an airline operates commuter plane flights to nearby islands.

Rota has two harbors, and the western one was completed in 1985.

See also List of numbered highways in the Northern Mariana Islands

== Education ==
=== Post-secondary ===
Northern Marianas College established the Rota Instructional Site to provide post-secondary, continuing, and adult education and training opportunities for the purpose of improving the quality of life for the people of Rota.

Since its inception in August 1986, the Rota Instructional Site has assisted many people who chose to pursue college education locally over the high cost of post-secondary education elsewhere. Many students have obtained a Certificate of Completion, an associate degree, or the Bachelor of Science degree in Elementary Education, have found better paying jobs, and have continued pursuing higher degrees.

The results are positive, and the community has depended on NMC for quality education and training. Presently, Rota offers a variety of programs:

- Adult Basic Education,
- Upward Bound,
- Educational Talent Search,
- CREES (Agriculture and Aquaculture Extension),
- 4H Club, and
- Expanded Food & Nutrition Education (EFNEP),
- Business Development Workshops,
- Continuing Education Courses, and
- Community Services Programs

=== Primary and secondary ===
Commonwealth of the Northern Mariana Islands Public School System operates public schools.

Rota has two public schools:

- Dr. Rita Hocog Inos Junior & Senior High School. In August 2011, Rota's junior and senior high schools were merged due to budget concerns. They are now Dr. Rita Hocog Inos Junior & Senior High School. With this merger, the junior high now consists only of the 7th and 8th grades. The 6th grade was moved to Sinapalo Elementary in Sinapalo Village. RHIJSHS is located on the former junior high school campus in Songsong Village. Rota Jr./Sr. High School was formed in 2006 by the consolidation of Rota High School and Rota Junior High School. The mascot is the Buck.
- Sinapalo Elementary School is located in Sinapalo village.

Rota's elementary school and junior high school (middle school) were formerly located in the same area and shared class buildings at Songsong village. After the new elementary school was built in Sinapalo, the Songsong village school ground was reopened as Rota Junior High. In 2010, the junior high school was renamed for the former Commissioner of Education, Dr. Rita Hocog Inos.

Rota has two private schools:

- Eskuelan San Francisco De Borja (ESFDB): Prep-8th Grade (Located in Songsong Village)
- Grace Christian Academy (GCA): Prep-9th Grade (Located in Sinapalo Village)

=== Public library ===
Antonio C. Atalig Memorial Rota Public Library of the State Library of the Commonwealth of the Northern Mariana Islands is in Songsong, Rota. The current library was built circa 2002 but it did not open until its "soft" opening on February 26, 2012. It was named after Mayor of Rota Antonio C. Atalig. It adopted its current name in 1981.

== Topography ==
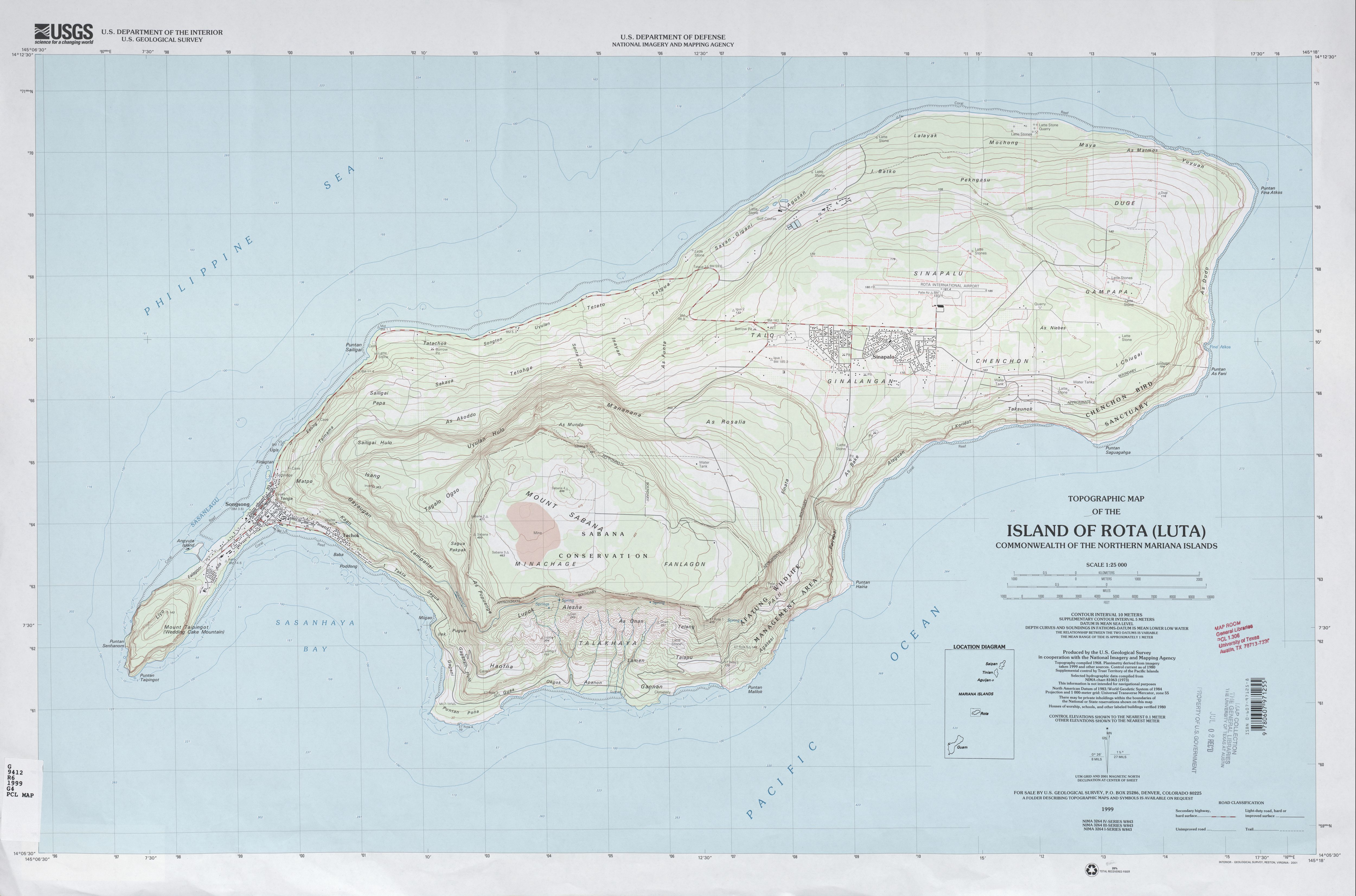
Topographic map of the island of Rota, showing buildings as of 1999.

== Soil types ==
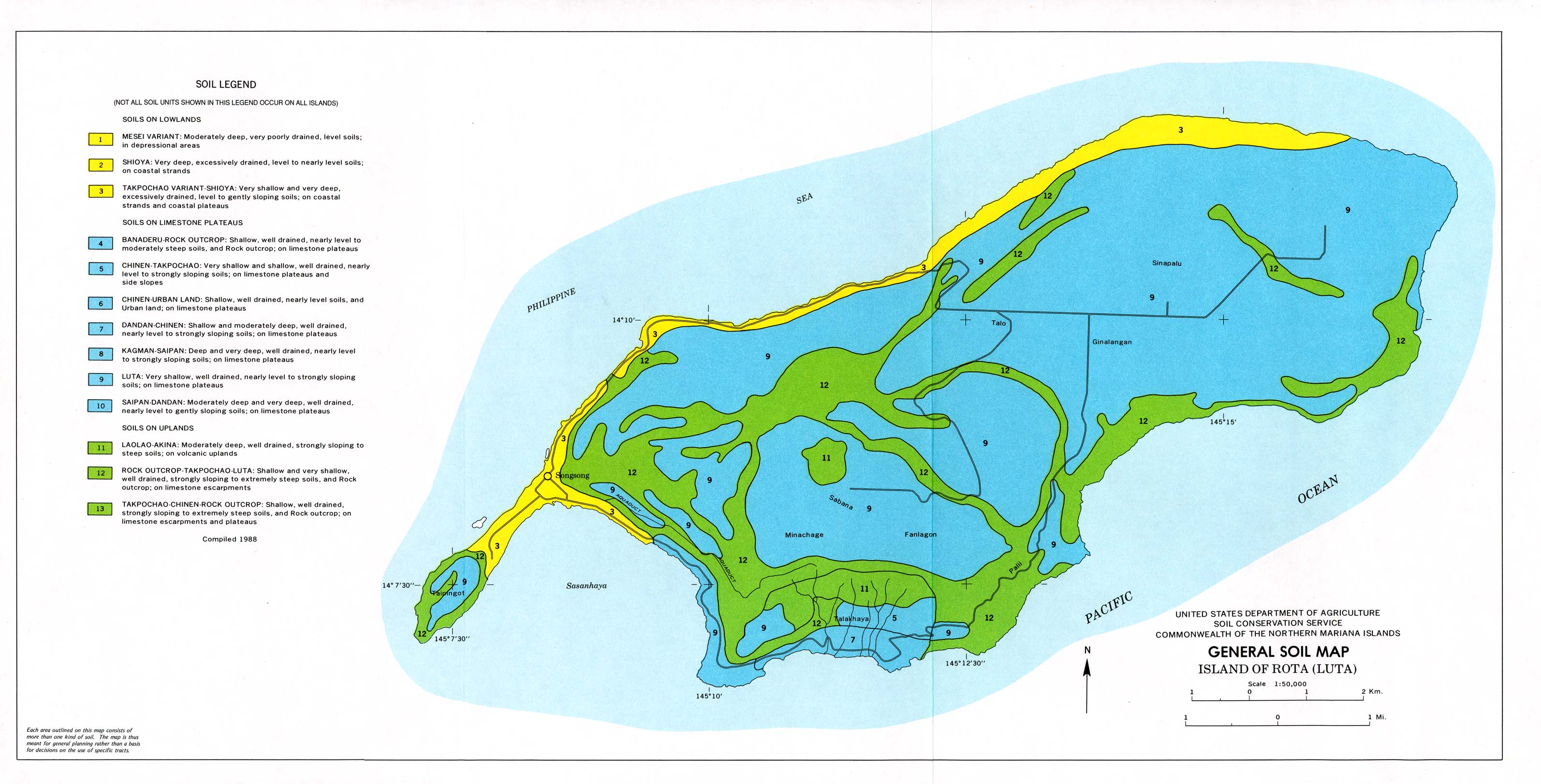
Map of the soil types on the island of Rota

== Gallery ==
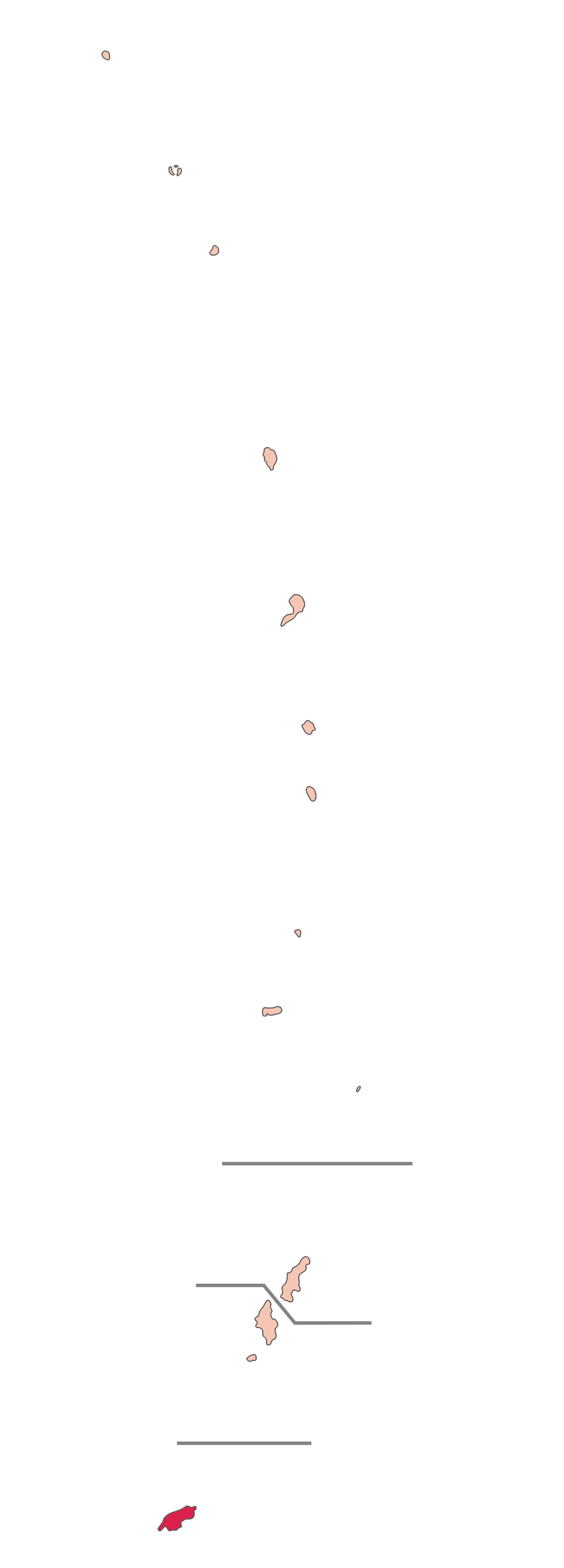
Map of the four municipalities of the Northern Mariana Islands, with Rota highlighted in red at the southernmost end.

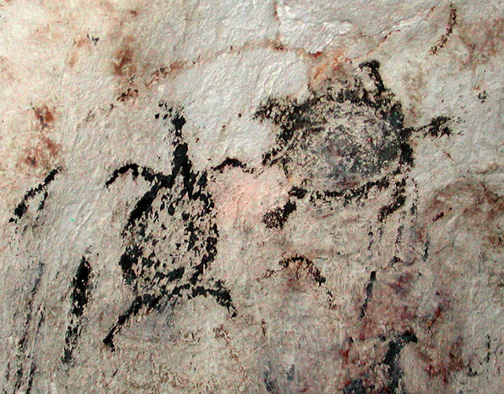
Pictographs at Chugai' Cave, Rota, Northern Mariana Islands.

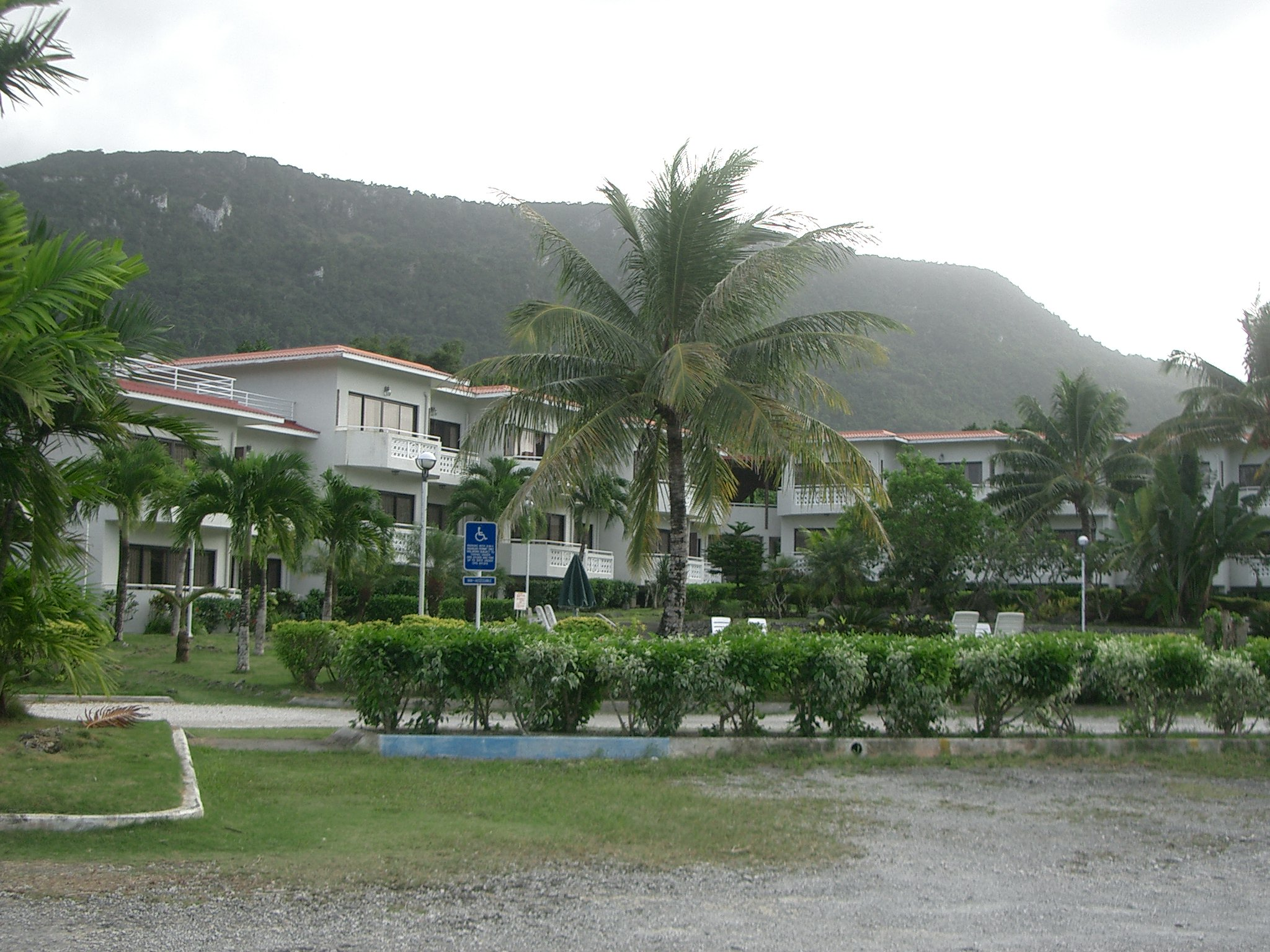
Hotel on Rota

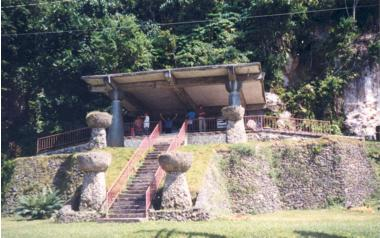
Ancient Chamoru Rota Cave Museum with latte stones.

== See also ==
- Chugai' Pictograph Site
- Rota Latte Stone Quarry
- National Register of Historic Places listings in the Northern Mariana Islands
