= List of Arisaema species =

As of February 2025, Plants of the World Online accepts the following Arisaema species separated by sections from Ohi-toma et al. 2016:

Image	Name	Year	Section	Distribution
	Arisaema abei Seriz.	1980	Pistillata	Japan (Shikoku)
	Arisaema acuminatum Small	1903	Pistillata	Southeastern United States
	Arisaema aequinoctiale Nakai & F.Maek.	1932	Pistillata	Japan (Honshu, Shikoku)
	Arisaema agasthyanum Sivad. & C.S.Kumar	1987	Sinarisaema	India
	Arisaema album N.E.Br.	1880	Attenuata	India (Arunachal Pradesh), Myanmar.
	Arisaema amurense Maxim.	1859	Pistillata	Russian Far East to Korea.
	Arisaema anatinum Brugg.	1818	Arisaema	India (Arunachal Pradesh)
	Arisaema angustatum Franch. & Sav.	1878	Pistillata	Japan (Honshu)
	Arisaema anomalum Hemsley	1887	Anomala	Peninsula Malaysia.
	Arisaema aprile J.Murata	1983	Pistillata	Japan (Honshu)
	Arisaema aridum H. Li	1977	Odorata	China (Sichuan, Yunnan)
	Arisaema arunachalense A.Nangkar, A.P.Das & H.Tag	1817	Sinarisaema	India (Arunachal Pradesh)
	Arisaema asperatum N. E. Brown	1903	Arisaema	China (Gansu, Henan, Hubei, Hunan, Shanxi, Sichuan)
	Arisaema attenuatum E.Barnes & C.E.C.Fisch.	1936	Sinarisaema	India (Kerala)
	Arisaema auriculatum Buchet	1911	Nepenthoidea	China (Hunan, Sichuan, Yunnan)
	Arisaema austroyunnanense H.Li	1977	Attenuata	China (Yunnan,Hainan) to Vietnam
	Arisaema averyanovii V.D.Nguyen & P.C.Boyce	1805	Attenuata	Vietnam
	Arisaema balaense Engl.	1920	Anomala	Vietnam, Thailand
	Arisaema bannaense H.Li	1988	Anomala	China (Yunnan)
	Arisaema barbatum Buchet	1911	Attenuata	China (Yunnan), Peninsula Thailand, Java to Lesser Sunda Islands (Bali)
	Arisaema barnesii C.E.C.Fisch.	1933	Sinarisaema	India, Sri Lanka
	Arisaema bathycoleum Hand.-Mazz.	1925	Odorata	China (Sichuan, Yunnan)
	Arisaema bockii Engler	1900	Pistillata	China(Anhui, Fujian, Guangdong, Guangxi, Guizhou, Henan, Hubei, Hunan, Jiangsu, Jiangxi, Zhejiang)
	Arisaema bogneri P.C.Boyce & H.Li	1999	Franchetiana	China (Yunnan, Xizang)
	Arisaema bonatianum Engler	1920	Arisaema	China (Sichuan, Yunnan)
	Arisaema bottae Schott	1860	Sinarisaema	Yemen
	Arisaema brinchangense Y.W.Low, Scherber. & Gusman	1816	Anomala	Peninsula Malaysia (Cameron Highlands)
	Arisaema brucei H. Li, R. Li & J. Murata	1810	Arisaema	China (Yunnan)
	Arisaema burmaense P.C.Boyce & H.Li	1999	Arisaema	China (Yunnan), Myanmar
	Arisaema calcareum H.Li	1977	Attenuata	China (Yunnan)
	Arisaema candidissimum W. W. Smith	1917	Franchetiana	China (Sichuan, Xizang, Yunnan)
	Arisaema caudatum Engl.	1879	Sinarisaema	India ( Goa, Himachal Pradesh, Karnataka, Maharashtra and Uttar Pradesh, Tamil Nadu)
	Arisaema chauvanminhii Luu, Q.D. Nguyen & N.L. Vu	2014	Attenuata	Vietnam
	Arisaema chenii Z.X. Ma & Yi Jun Huang	1818	Attenuata	China (Guangdong)
	Arisaema chumponense Gagnep.	1941	Anomala	Thailand
	Arisaema ciliatum H. Li	1977	Sinarisaema	China (Sichuan, Yunnan)
	Arisaema clavatum Buchet	1911	Clavata	China(Guizhou, Hubei, Sichuan.)
	Arisaema claviforme Brugg., J.Ponert, Rybková & Vuong	1813	Anomala	Vietnam.
	Arisaema concinnum Schott	1859	Sinarisaema	China (Xizang)
	Arisaema condaoense V.D.Nguyen	1800	Attenuata	Vietnam
	Arisaema consanguineum Schott	1859	Sinarisaema	Assam, China , Laos, Myanmar, Nepal, Qinghai, Taiwan, Thailand, Tibet, Vietnam, West Himalaya
	Arisaema constrictum E.Barnes	1936	Sinarisaema	Sri Lanka
	Arisaema cordatum N.E.Br.	1903	Flagellarisaema	China (Guangxi, Guangdong)
	Arisaema costatum (Wallich) Martius ex Schott & Endliche	1832	Arisaema	China (Xizang), Nepal
	Arisaema cucullatum M.Hotta	1962	Pistillata	Japan (Honshu)
	Arisaema dahaiense H. Li	1977	Arisaema	China (Yunnan), Myanmar
	Arisaema decipiens Schott	1857	Decipientia	China (Guangxi, Guizhou, Hunan, Sichuan, Tibet and Yunnan), India, Myanmar, and Vietnam
	Arisaema dracontium (L.) Schott	1832	Flagellarisaema	Canada(Quebec), United States (Minnesota south through Florida and Texas), Mexico (Nuevo León, Veracruz)
	Arisaema echinatum (Wallich) Schott in Schott & Endlicher	1832	Sinarisaema	China (Xizang, Yunnan), Bhutan, India (Sikkim), Nepal
	Arisaema echinoides H. Li	1800	Sinarisaema	China (Yunnan)
	Arisaema ehimense J.Murata & J.Ohno	1989	Pistillata	Japan (Shikoku).
	Arisaema elephas Buchet	1911	Arisaema	China (Gansu, Guizhou, Sichuan, Xizang, Yunnan), Bhutan, Myanmar
	Arisaema enneaphyllum Hochst. ex A.Rich.	1850	Sinarisaema	Ethiopia, Kenya, Sudan, Uganda, Yemen
	Arisaema erubescens (Wallich) Schott in Schott & Endlicher	1832	Sinarisaema	China (Anhui, Fujian, Gansu, Guangdong, Guangxi, Guizhou, Hebei, Henan, Hubei, Hunan, Jiangxi, Shaanxi, Shandong, Shanxi, Sichuan, Taiwan, Yunnan, Zhejiang), Bhutan, India, Laos, Myanmar, Nepal, Thailand, Vietnam.
	Arisaema exappendiculatum H. Hara	1965	Sinarisaema	China (Xizang), Nepal
	Arisaema fargesii Buchet	1911	Franchetiana	China(Gansu, Hubei, Hunan, Sichuan, Xizang, Yunnan)
	Arisaema filiforme (Reinw.) Blume	1836	Anomala	Borneo, Java, Lesser Sunda Islands, Malaya, Sumatera
	Arisaema fimbriatum Masters	1884	Fimbriata	Thailand, Peninsular Malaysia, and Pulau Lankawi
	Arisaema fischeri Manudev & Nampy	1819	Sinarisaema	India (Kerala)
	Arisaema flavum (Forssk.) Schott	1860	Dochafa	Ethiopia, Somalia, the Arabian Peninsula, Pakistan, Afghanistan, Nepal, Assam, Himalayas, Tibet, Yunnan, and Sichuan
	Arisaema formosanum (Hayata) Hayata	1915	Sinarisaema	Taiwan
	Arisaema franchetianum Engler	1881	Franchetiana	China (Guangxi, Guizhou, Hunan, Sichuan, Yunnan), Myanmar
	Arisaema fraternum Schott	1859	Sinarisaema	India (Assam)
	Arisaema galeatum N.E.Br.	1879	Arisaema	India (Assam, Sikkim), China (Xizang), Myanmar,
	Arisaema garrettii Gagnep.	1941	Anomala	Thailand
	Arisaema ghaticum (Sardesai, S.P.Gaikwad & S.R.Yadav) Punekar & Kumaran	1809	Tortuosa	India( Maharashtra)
	Arisaema grapsospadix Hayata	1915	Anomala	Taiwan
	Arisaema griffithii Schott	1856	Arisaema	China (Xizang), Nepal, India (Darjeeling)
	Arisaema guangxiense G.W.Hu & H.Li	1812	Attenuata	China (Guangxi)
	Arisaema guanwuense S.S. Ying	1823	Sinarisaema	Taiwan
	Arisaema hainanense C. Y. Wu ex H. Li, Y. Shiao & S. L. Tseng	1977	Anomala	China (Hainan.)
	Arisaema handelii Stapf ex Handel-Mazzetti	1936	Arisaema	China (Xizang, Yunnan)
	Arisaema heterocephalum Koidz.	1928	Clavata	Ryukyu Islands
	Arisaema heterophyllum Blume.	1835	Flagellarisaema	China, Inner Mongolia, Japan, and Korea
	Arisaema honbaense Luu, Tich, G.Tran & V.D.Nguyen	1813	Attenuata	Vietnam
	Arisaema hunanense Handel-Mazzetti	1936	Clavata	China (Guangdong, Hubei, Hunan, E Sichuan.)
	Arisaema ilanense J. C. Wang	1996	Clavata	Taiwan
	Arisaema inaense (Seriz.) Seriz. ex K.Sasam. & J.Murata	1808	Pistillata	Central Japan
	Arisaema inclusum (N.E.Br.) N.E.Br. ex B.D.Jacks.	1893	Attenuata	Java, Lesser Sunda Islands, Sumatra
	Arisaema intermedium Blume	1835	Arisaema	China (Xizang, Yunnan), India (Darjeeling, Himachal Pradesh, Uttarakhand, Kashmir), Nepal
	Arisaema ishizuchiense Murata	1956	Pistillata	Japan (Shikoku).
	Arisaema iyoanum Makino	1932	Pistillata	Japan (W. Honshu, Shikoku).
	Arisaema jacquemontii Blume	1835	Tenuipistillata	China (Xizang), Afghanistan, Bangladesh, Bhutan, India (Kashmir), Nepal, Pakistan
	Arisaema japonicum Blume	1836	Pistillata	Japan (Shikoku, Kyushu), Korea
	Arisaema jethompsonii Thiyagaraj & P.Daniel	1999	Tortuosa	India (Tamil Nadu)
	Arisaema jingdongense H. Peng & H. Li	1995	Sinarisaema	China (Yunnan)
	Arisaema kawashimae Seriz.	1980	Pistillata	Japan (Nansei-shoto)
	Arisaema kayahense J. Murata	2020	Sinarisaema	Myanmar (Kayah)
	Arisaema kerrii Craib	1912	Sinarisaema	Thailand.
	Arisaema kishidae Makino ex Nakai	1917	Pistillata	Japan (Honshu)
	Arisaema kiushianum Makino	1918	Flagellarisaema	Japan (Honshu, Kyushu)
	Arisaema kuratae Seriz.	1981	Pistillata	Japan (Honshu)
	Arisaema lackneri Engl.	1898	Attenuata	China (SW. Yunnan), Myanmar.
	Arisaema laminatum Blume	1836	Attenuata	Borneo, Java, Lesser Sunda Islands, Malaya, Philippines, Sumatra
	Arisaema langbiangense Luu, Nguyen-Phi & H.T.Van	1816	Anomala	Vietnam
	Arisaema leschenaultii Blume	1836	Sinarisaema	India, Nepal, Sri Lanka
	Arisaema lichiangense W. W. Smith	1914	Franchetiana	China (Sichuan, Yunnan)
	Arisaema lidaense J. Murata & S. G. Wu	1803	Odorata	China (Yunnan), Vietnam
	Arisaema liemiana Luu, H.T.Van, H.C.Nguyen & V.D.Nguyen	1820	Attentuata	Vietnam
	Arisaema lihengianum J. Murata & S. K. Wu	1803	Anomala	China (Guangxi), Vietnam
	Arisaema limbatum Nakai & F.Maek.	1932	Pistillata	Japan (SW. Honshu, Kyushu, Shikoku).
	Arisaema lingyunense H. Li	1977	Arisaema	China (Guangxi), Myanmar
	Arisaema lobatum Engl.	1881	Pistillata	China
	Arisaema longipedunculatum M.Hotta	1966	Pistillata	Japan
	Arisaema longitubum Z.X.Ma	1818	Odorata	China (Yunnan)
	Arisaema lushuiense G.W.Hu & H.Li	1812	Nepenthoidea	China (Yunnan)
	Arisaema macrospathum Bentham	1840	Flagellarisaema	Mexico
	Arisaema madhuanum Nampy & Manudev	1814	Sinarisaema	India (Kerala, Tamil Nadu)
	Arisaema maekawae J.Murata & S.Kakish.	1808	Pistillata	Japan (W. & Central Honshu).
	Arisaema mairei H. Lév.	1915	Odorata	China (Sichuan, Yunnan)
	Arisaema maximowiczii (Engl.) Nakai	1928	Pistillata	Japan (Kyushu).
	Arisaema maxwellii Hett. & Gusman	1811	Attenuata	Thailand
	Arisaema mayebarae Nakai	1940	Pistillata	Japan (C. & S. Kyushu).
	Arisaema melanostoma Z.X.Ma, Xiao Yun Wang & Wen Yan Du	1819	Flagellarisaema	China (Guangdong)
	Arisaema meleagris Buchet	1911	Nepenthoidea	China (Chongqing, Sichuan, Yunnan)
	Arisaema menglaense Y. H. Ji, H. Li & Z. F. Xu	1804	Anomala	China (Yunnan)
	Arisaema microspadix Engl.	1905	Attenuata	Java to Lesser Sunda Islands (C. Timor).
	Arisaema mildbraedii Engl.	1910	Pistillata	SE Central & E. Tropical Africa.
	Arisaema minamitanii Seriz.	1981	Pistillata	Japan (Kyushu).
	Arisaema minus (Seriz.) J.Murata	1986	Pistillata	Japan (W. Honshu)
	Arisaema monophyllum Nakai	1917	Pistillata	Japan (Honshu)
	Arisaema mooneyanum M.G.Gilbert & Mayo	1986	Sinarisaema	Ethiopia
	Arisaema muratae Gusman & J. T. Yin	1807	Sinarisaema	China (Yunnan)
	Arisaema muricaudatum Sivad.	1985	Tortuosa	India (Kerala)
	Arisaema murrayi (J.Graham) Hook.	1848	Tortuosa	India
	Arisaema nagiense Tom.Kobay., K.Sasam. & J.Murata	1808	Pistillata	Japan (Honshu)
	Arisaema nambae Kitam.	1966	Pistillata	Japan (Honshu)
	Arisaema negishii Makino	1918	Clavata	S. Korea, Japan (Hachijo, Miyake Islands)
	Arisaema nepenthoides (Wallich) Martius ex Schott & Endlicher	1832	Nepenthoidea	China (Xizang, Yunnan), Bhutan, India (Darjeeling, Sikkim), Myanmar, Nepal
	Arisaema nikoense Nakai	1929	Pistillata	Japan (Honshu)
	Arisaema nilamburense Sivad.	1938	Sinarisaema	India (Kerala)
	Arisaema nonghinense Klinrat. & Yannawat	1814	Anomala	Thailand
	Arisaema odoratum J. Murata & S. G. Wu	1994	Odorata	China (Yunnan)
	Arisaema ogatae Koidz.	1925	Pistillata	Japan (Kyushu)
	Arisaema omkoiense Gusman	1801	Anomala	Thailand
	Arisaema ornatum Miq.	1856	Anomala	Sumatra
	Arisaema ovale Nakai	1935	Pistillata	Japan (W. Hokkaido, Honshu, N. Kyushu)
	Arisaema pachystachyum Hett. & Gusman	1803	Attenuata	Thailand
	Arisaema pallidum Engl.	1920	Attenuata	Sumatra
	Arisaema parisifolium J.Murata	1805	Sinarisaema	Vietnam, Laos
	Arisaema parvum N. E. Brown	1893	Arisaema	China (Xizang, Yunnan, Sichuan)
	Arisaema pattaniense Gagnep.	1941	Anomala	Thailand
	Arisaema peerumedense J.Mathew	1817	Sinarisaema	India (Kerala)
	Arisaema peltatum C.E.C.Fisch.	1936	Sinarisaema	India (Kerala).
	Arisaema penicillatum N.E.Br.	1880	Attenuata	China (Guangdong, Guangxi, Hainan), Taiwan.
	Arisaema petelotii K. Krause	1932	Anomala	China (Yunnan), Vietnam
	Arisaema petiolulatum J. D. Hooker	1894	Anomala	China (Yunnan), India, Myanmar
	Arisaema pianmaense H.Li	1992	Arisaema	China (Yunnan), Myanmar.
	Arisaema pierreanum Engl.	1920	Attenuata	Vietnam
	Arisaema pingbianense H. Li	1988	Anomala	China (Yunnan)
	Arisaema polyphyllum (Blanco) Merr.	1905	Sinarisaema	Philippines, Sulawesi.
	Arisaema prazeri Hook. f.	1893	Odorata	China (Yunnan), Myanmar, Thailand
	Arisaema propinquum Schott	1857	Arisaema	China (Xizang), India, Nepal, Pakistan
	Arisaema pseudoangustatum Seriz.	1813	Pistillata	Japan.
	Arisaema psittacus E.Barnes	1940	Sinarisaema	India (Kerala)
	Arisaema pusillum (Peck) Nash	1901	Pistillata	Eastern United States
	Arisaema quinatum (Nutt.) Schott	1856	Pistillata	Southeastern United States
	Arisaema ramulosum Alderw.	1922	Attenuata	Java to Lesser Sunda Islands
	Arisaema ringens (Thunberg) Schott in Schott & Endlicher	1832	Pistillata	China(Jiangsu, Taiwan, Zhejiang), Japan, Korea
	Arisaema rostratum V.D.Nguyen & P.C.Boyce	1805	Anomala	Vietnam
	Arisaema roxburghii Kunth	1841	Attenuata	India (Arunachal Pradesh, Assam), Cambodia, Laos, Malaya, Thailand, Vietnam
	Arisaema rubrirhizomatum H. Li & J. Murata	1810	Anomala	China (Yunnan)
	Arisaema ruwenzoricum N.E.Br.	1901	Sinarisaema	Burundi, Uganda, Zaïre
	Arisaema sachalinense (Miyabe & Kudô) J.Murata	1986	Pistillata	Japan (N. Hokkaido)
	Arisaema saddlepeakense P.S.N.Rao & S.K.Srivast.	1991	Attenuata	Andaman Is.
	Arisaema sarracenioides E.Barnes & C.E.C.Fisch.	1936	Sinarisaema	India (S. Kerala, Tamil Nadu)
	Arisaema saxatile Buchet	1911	Odorata	China (Sichuan, Yunnan)
	Arisaema sazensoo (Blume) Makino	1901	Pistillata	Japan (Kyushu, Yakushima).
	Arisaema schimperianum Schott	1859	Arisaema	Zaire, Ethiopia, Sudan, Uganda
	Arisaema scortechinii Hook.f.	1893	Anomala	Malaysia
	Arisaema seppikoense Kitam.	1949	Pistillata	Japan (Honshu)
	Arisaema serratum (Thunb.) Schott	1832	Pistillata	Korea, Kuril Islands to Japan.
	Arisaema setosum A.S.Rao & D.M.Verma	1971	Anomala	India (Arunachal Pradesh.)
	Arisaema siamicum Gagnep.	1811	Attenuata	Thailand
	Arisaema sikokianum Franch. & Sav.	1878	Pistillata	Japan (S. Honshu, Shikoku)
	Arisaema silvestrii Pampanini	1915	Clavata	China (Anhui, Fujian, Guangdong, Guizhou, Henan, Hubei, Hunan, Jiangsu, Jiangxi, Shanxi, Zhejiang)
	Arisaema sinii K. Krause	1930	Franchetiana	China (Guangxi, Guizhou, Hunan, Sichuan, Yunnan)
	Arisaema sizemoreae Hett. & Gusman	1803	Attenuata	Thailand
	Arisaema smitinandii S. Y. Hu	1968	Anomala	China (Xizang), Thailand
	Arisaema somalense M.G.Gilbert & Mayo	1986	Sinarisaema	Somalia
	Arisaema souliei Buchet	1911	Tenuipistillata	China (Sichuan)
	Arisaema speciosum (Wallich) Martius ex Schott & Endlicher	1832	Arisaema	China (Xizang), Bhutan, India, Nepal
	Arisaema stewardsonii Britton	1901	Pistillata	Eastern Canada, Northeastern United States
	Arisaema subulatum Manudev & Nampy	1819	Sinarisaema	India (Kerala).
	Arisaema sukotaiense Gagnepain	1941	Sinarisaema	China (Yunnan), Thailand
	Arisaema taiwanense J. Murata	1985	Sinarisaema	Taiwan
	Arisaema tashiroi Kitam.	1941	Pistillata	Japan (Kyushu)
	Arisaema tengtsungense H. Li	1977	Arisaema	China (Yunnan), Myanmar
	Arisaema ternatipartitum Makino	1901	Pistillata	Japan (S. Honshu, Shikoku, N. Kyushu).
	Arisaema thunbergii Blume	1835	Flagellarisaema	Japan
	Arisaema tortuosum (Wallich) Schott in Schott & Endlicher	1832	Tortuosa	India (Assam), China (Sichuan, Xizang, Yunnan), Bhutan, Myanmar, Nepal, Pakistan, Sri Lanka
	Arisaema tosaense Makino	1901	Pistillata	Japan (W. Honshu, Shikoku, Kyushu)
	Arisaema translucens C.E.C.Fisch.	1933	Sinarisaema	India (Kerala, Tamil Nadu)
	Arisaema triphyllum (L.) Schott	1832	Pistillata	Central & E. Canada to Central & E. U.S.A.
	Arisaema tuberculatum C.E.C.Fisch.	1935	Sinarisaema	India (Kerala, Tamil Nadu)
	Arisaema ulugurense M.G.Gilbert & Mayo	1985	Sinarisaema	Tanzania
	Arisaema umbrinum Ridl.	1905	Anomala	Borneo
	Arisaema undulatifolium Nakai	1929	Pistillata	Japan (Honshu, Shikoku)
	Arisaema utile J. D. Hooker ex Schott	1860	Arisaema	China (Xizang, Yunnan), Bhutan, India (Kashmir), Myanmar, Nepal, Pakistan
	Arisaema vexillatum H. Hara & H. Ohashi	1973	Arisaema	China (Xizang), Nepal
	Arisaema victoriae V. D. Nguyen	1800	Anomala	China (Guangxi), Vietnam
	Arisaema vietnamense Luu, Q. B. Nguyen, H. C. Nguyen & T. Q. T. Nguyen	1822	Nepenthoidea	Vietnam (Lai Chau)
	Arisaema wangmoense M.T.An, H.H.Zhang & Q.Lin	1811	Sinarisaema	China (Guizhou)
	Arisaema wardii C. Marquand & Airy Shaw	1929	Tenuipistillata	China (Qinghai, Shanxi, Xizang, Yunnan)
	Arisaema wattii J. D. Hooker	1893	Nepenthoidea	China (Xizang, Yunnan), India (Assam, Manipur), Myanmar
	Arisaema wilsonii Engler	1920	Arisaema	China (Gansu, Xizang, Sichuan, Yunnan)
	Arisaema wrayi Hemsl.	1887	Anomala	Peninsula Thailand to Peninsula Malaysia, Borneo (Sabah)
	Arisaema xuanweiense H.Li	1800	Pistillata	China (Yunnan).
	Arisaema yamatense (Nakai) Nakai	1929	Pistillata	Japan (Honshu)
	Arisaema yunnanense Buchet	1911	Odorata	China (Guizhou, Sichuan, Yunnan), Myanmar, Thailand, Vietnam
	Arisaema zhui H. Li	1800	Sinarisaema	China (Yunnan)
