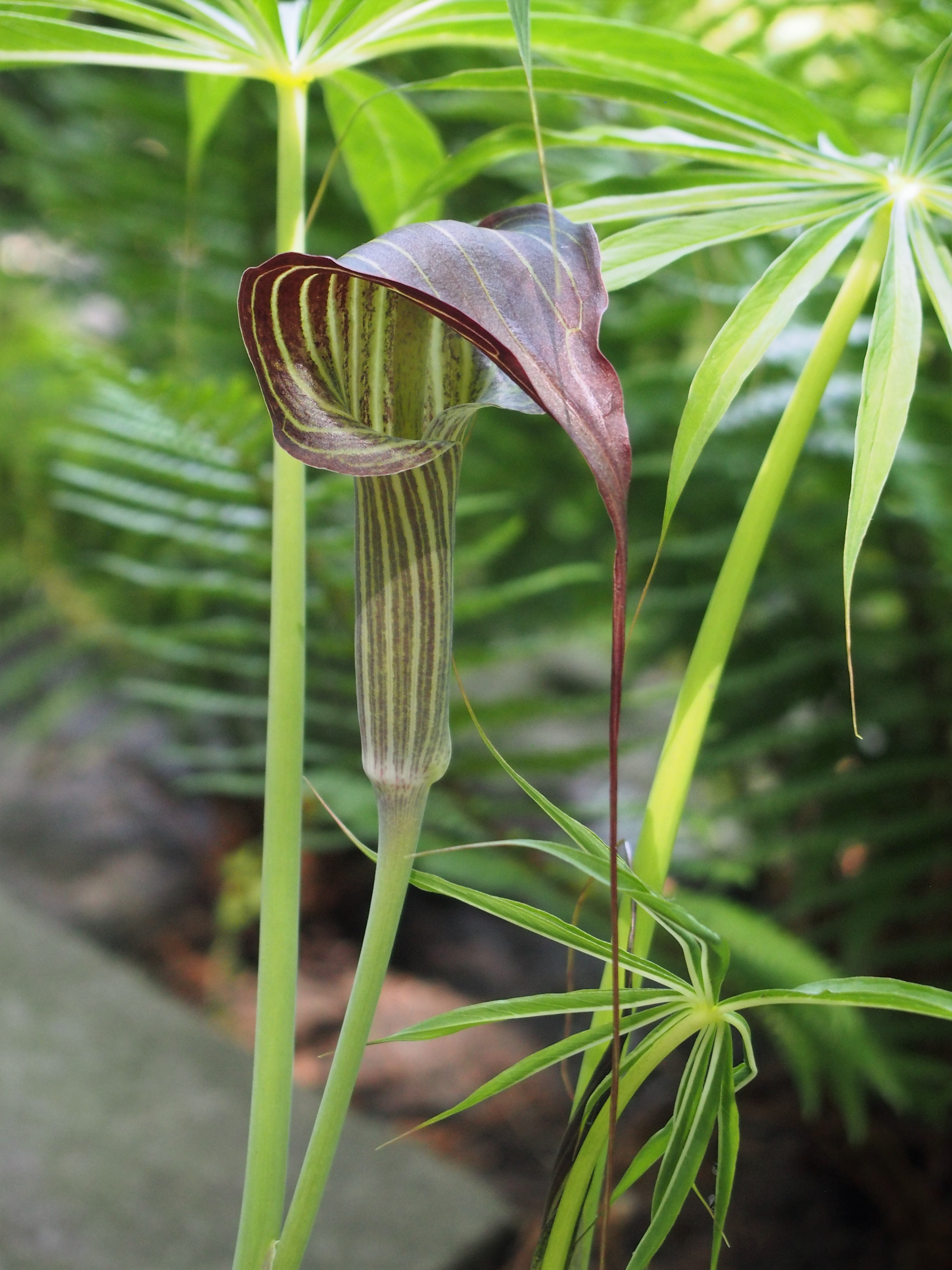
- Arisaema erubescens

Scientific classification
- Kingdom: Plantae
- Clade: Embryophytes
- Clade: Tracheophytes
- Clade: Spermatophytes
- Clade: Angiosperms
- Clade: Monocots
- Order: Alismatales
- Family: Araceae
- Genus: Arisaema
- Section: Arisaema sect. Sinarisaema; Nakai 1950

Type species
- Arisaema formosanum

Species
- See text

Synonyms
- Arisaema subsect. Exappendiculata (H.Hara) Gusman 2006; Arisaema subsect. Exappendiculata (H.Hara) J.Murat 1984; Arisaema sect. Peltatisecta Schott 1860; Arisaema sect. Radiatisecta Schott 1860

= Arisaema sect. Sinarisaema =

Subgenus of flowering plants

Arisaema section Sinarisaema is a section of the genus Arisaema.

== Description ==
Plants in this section have a subglobose tuber with 1–2 radiate, sessile, leaves with 5 –25 leaflets.

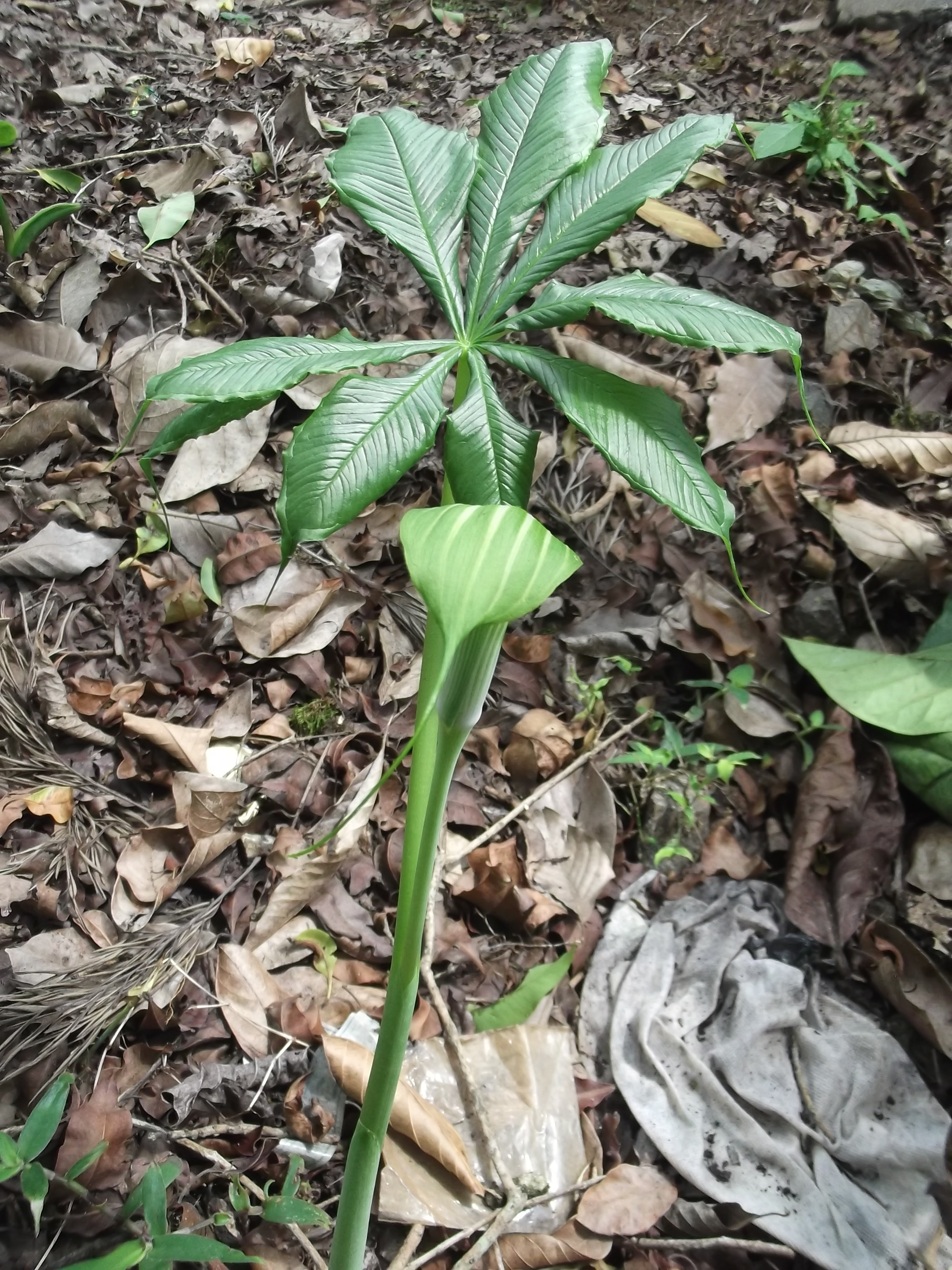
Plant habit of Arisaema leschenaultii

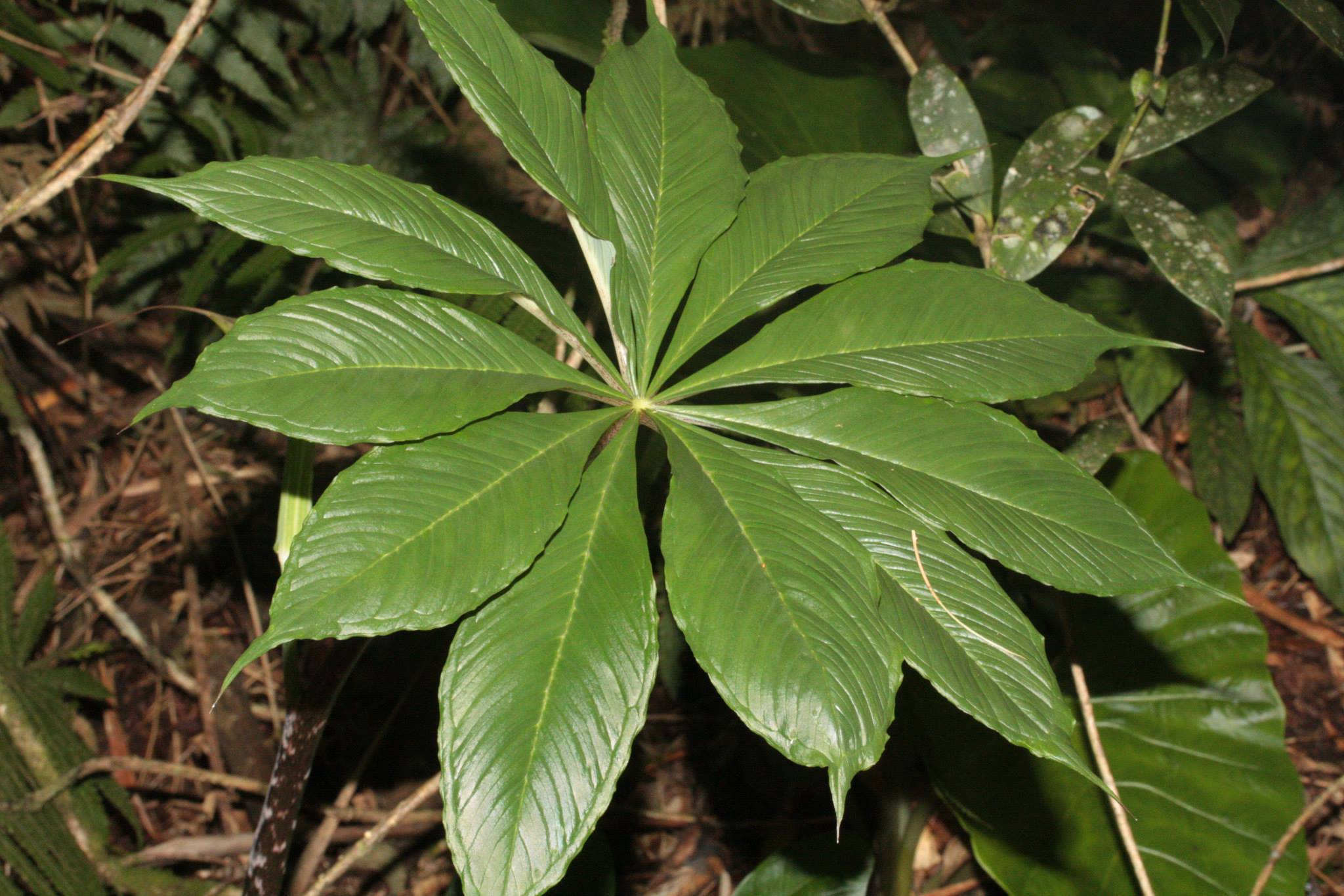
Leaves of Arisaema polyphyllum

== Distribution ==
Plants from this section are found from Yemen to Southeast Asia, with a few species from Africa.

== Species ==
Arisaema section Sinarisaema comprises the following species:

Image	Name	Year	Distribution
	Arisaema agasthyanum Sivad. & C.S.Kumar	1987	India
	Arisaema arunachalense A.Nangkar, A.P.Das & H.Tag	2017	India (Arunachal Pradesh)
	Arisaema attenuatum E.Barnes & C.E.C.Fisch.	1936	India (Kerala)
	Arisaema barnesii C.E.C.Fisch.	1933	India, Sri Lanka
	Arisaema bottae Schott	1860	Yemen
	Arisaema caudatum Engl.	1879	India ( Goa, Himachal Pradesh, Karnataka, Maharashtra and Uttar Pradesh, Tamil Nadu)
	Arisaema ciliatum H. Li	1977	China (Sichuan, Yunnan)
	Arisaema concinnum Schott	1859	China (Xizang)
	Arisaema consanguineum Schott	1859	Assam, China, Laos, Myanmar, Nepal, Qinghai, Taiwan, Thailand, Tibet, Vietnam, West Himalaya
	Arisaema constrictum E.Barnes	1936	Sri Lanka
	Arisaema echinoides H. Li	2000	China (Yunnan)
	Arisaema echinatum (Wallich) Schott in Schott & Endlicher	1832	China (Xizang, Yunnan), Bhutan, India (Sikkim), Nepal
	Arisaema enneaphyllum Hochst. ex A.Rich.	1850	Ethiopia, Kenya, Sudan, Uganda, Yemen
	Arisaema erubescens (Wallich) Schott in Schott & Endlicher	1832	China (Anhui, Fujian, Gansu, Guangdong, Guangxi, Guizhou, Hebei, Henan, Hubei, Hunan, Jiangxi, Shaanxi, Shandong, Shanxi, Sichuan, Taiwan, Yunnan, Zhejiang), Bhutan, India, Laos, Myanmar, Nepal, Thailand, Vietnam.
	Arisaema exappendiculatum H. Hara	1965	China (Xizang), Nepal
	Arisaema formosanum (Hayata) Hayata	1915	Taiwan
	Arisaema fraternum Schott	1859	India (Assam)
	Arisaema fischeri Manudev & Nampy	2019	India (Kerala)
	Arisaema guanwuense S.S. Ying	2023	Taiwan
	Arisaema jingdongense H. Peng & H. Li	1995	China (Yunnan)
	Arisaema kayahense J. Murata	2020	Myanmar (Kayah)
	Arisaema kerrii Craib	1912	Thailand.
	Arisaema leschenaultii Blume	1836	India, Nepal, Sri Lanka
	Arisaema madhuanum Nampy & Manudev	2014	India (Kerala, Tamil Nadu)
	Arisaema mooneyanum M.G.Gilbert & Mayo	1986	Ethiopia
	Arisaema muratae Gusman & J. T. Yin	2007	China (Yunnan)
	Arisaema nilamburense Sivad.	1938	India (Kerala)
	Arisaema parisifolium J.Murata	2005	Vietnam, Laos
	Arisaema peerumedense J.Mathew	2017	India (Kerala)
	Arisaema peltatum C.E.C.Fisch.	1936	India (Kerala).
	Arisaema polyphyllum (Blanco) Merr.	1905	Philippines, Sulawesi.
	Arisaema psittacus E.Barnes	1940	India (Kerala)
	Arisaema ruwenzoricum N.E.Br.	1901	Burundi, Uganda, Zaïre
	Arisaema subulatum Manudev & Nampy	2019	India (Kerala).
	Arisaema sarracenioides E.Barnes & C.E.C.Fisch.	1936	India (S. Kerala, Tamil Nadu)
	Arisaema somalense M.G.Gilbert & Mayo	1986	Somalia
	Arisaema sukotaiense Gagnepain	1941	China (Yunnan), Thailand
	Arisaema taiwanense J. Murata	1985	Taiwan
	Arisaema translucens C.E.C.Fisch.	1933	India (Kerala, Tamil Nadu)
	Arisaema tuberculatum C.E.C.Fisch.	1935	India (Kerala, Tamil Nadu)
	Arisaema ulugurense M.G.Gilbert & Mayo	1985	Tanzania
	Arisaema wangmoense M.T.An, H.H.Zhang & Q.Lin	2011	China (Guizhou)
	Arisaema zhui H. Li	2000	China (Yunnan)
