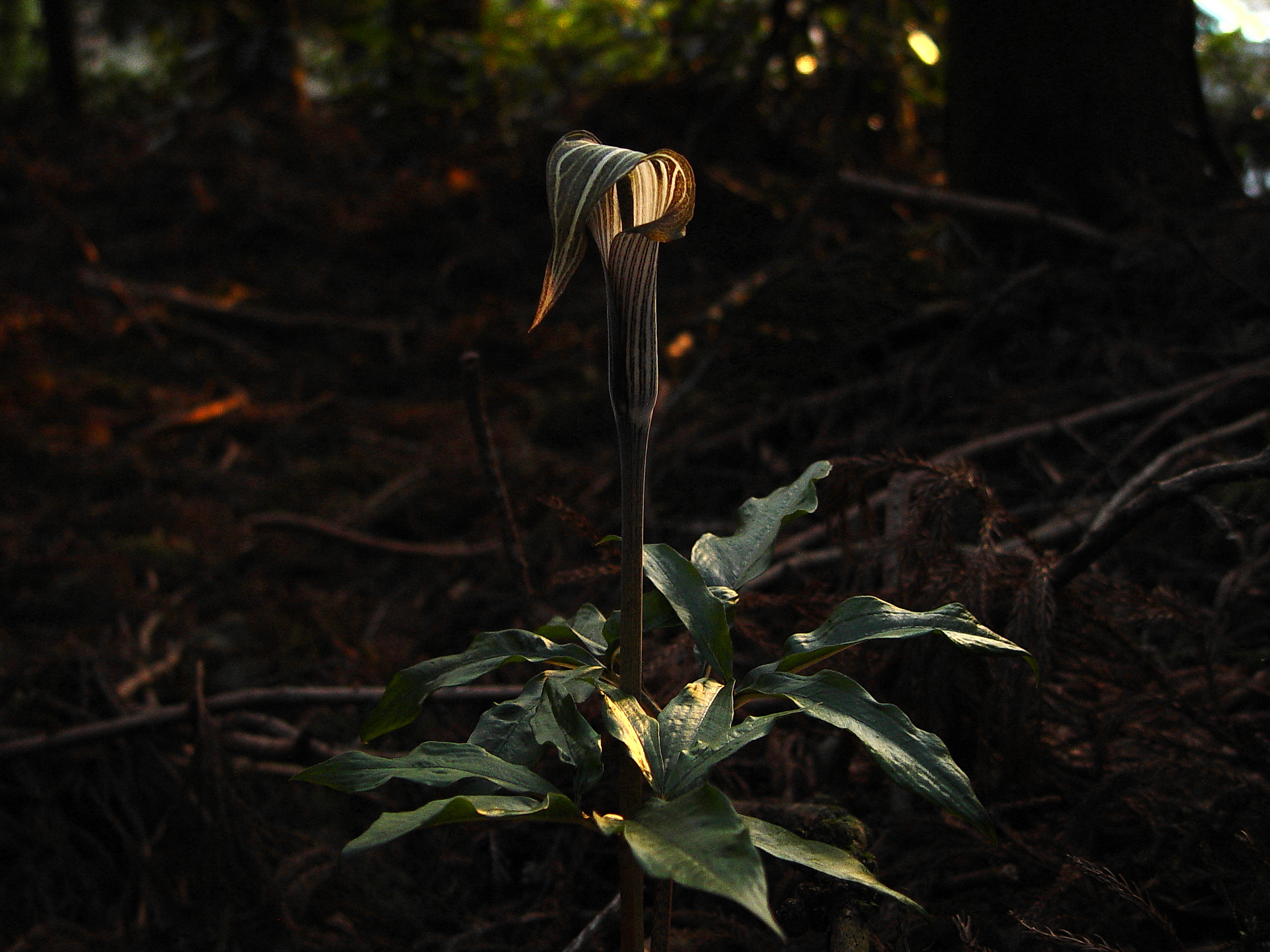
- Arisaema serratum

Scientific classification
- Kingdom: Plantae
- Clade: Tracheophytes
- Clade: Angiosperms
- Clade: Monocots
- Order: Alismatales
- Family: Araceae
- Genus: Arisaema
- Section: Arisaema sect. Pistillata (Engler) Nakai 1929

Type species
- Arisaema serratum

Species
- See text

= Arisaema sect. Pistillata =

Subgenus of flowering plants

Arisaema section Pistillata is a section of the genus Arisaema.

== Description ==
Plants in this section have paradioecious tubers with one to two 3 foliate or pedately multifoliolate leaves.

== Distribution ==
Plants from this section are found in East Asia with one disjunct population in North America.

== Species ==
Arisaema section Pistillata comprises the following species:

Image	Name	Year	Distribution
	Arisaema abei Seriz.	1980	Japan (Shikoku)
	Arisaema acuminatum Small	1903	Southeastern United States
	Arisaema aequinoctiale Nakai & F.Maek.	1932	Japan (Honshu, Shikoku)
	Arisaema amurense Maxim.	1859	Russian Far East to Korea.
	Arisaema angustatum Franch. & Sav.	1878	Japan (Honshu)
	Arisaema aprile J.Murata	1983	Japan (Honshu)
	Arisaema bockii Engler	1900	China(Anhui, Fujian, Guangdong, Guangxi, Guizhou, Henan, Hubei, Hunan, Jiangsu, Jiangxi, Zhejiang)
	Arisaema cucullatum M.Hotta	1962	Japan (Honshu)
	Arisaema ehimense J.Murata & J.Ohno	1989	Japan (Shikoku).
	Arisaema inaense (Seriz.) Seriz. ex K.Sasam. & J.Murata	2008	Central Japan
	Arisaema ishizuchiense Murata	1956	Japan (Shikoku).
	Arisaema iyoanum Makino	1932	Japan (W. Honshu, Shikoku).
	Arisaema japonicum Blume	1836	Japan (Shikoku, Kyushu), Korea
	Arisaema kawashimae Seriz.	1980	Japan (Nansei-shoto)
	Arisaema kishidae Makino ex Nakai	1917	Japan (Honshu)
	Arisaema kuratae Seriz.	1981	Japan (Honshu)
	Arisaema limbatum Nakai & F.Maek.	1932	Japan (SW. Honshu, Kyushu, Shikoku).
	Arisaema lobatum Engl.	1881	China
	Arisaema longipedunculatum M.Hotta	1966	Japan
	Arisaema maekawae J.Murata & S.Kakish.	2008	Japan (W. & Central Honshu).
	Arisaema maximowiczii (Engl.) Nakai	1928	Japan (Kyushu).
	Arisaema mayebarae Nakai	1940	Japan (C. & S. Kyushu).
	Arisaema mildbraedii Engl.	1910	SE Central & E. Tropical Africa.
	Arisaema minamitanii Seriz.	1981	Japan (Kyushu).
	Arisaema minus (Seriz.) J.Murata	1986	Japan (W. Honshu)
	Arisaema monophyllum Nakai	1917	Japan (Honshu)
	Arisaema nagiense Tom.Kobay., K.Sasam. & J.Murata	2008	Japan (Honshu).
	Arisaema nambae Kitam.	1966	Japan (Honshu).
	Arisaema nikoense Nakai	1929	Japan (Honshu).
	Arisaema ogatae Koidz.	1925	Japan (Kyushu)
	Arisaema ovale Nakai	1935	Japan (W. Hokkaido, Honshu, N. Kyushu)
	Arisaema pseudoangustatum Seriz.	2013	Japan.
	Arisaema pusillum (Peck) Nash	1901	Eastern United States
	Arisaema quinatum (Nutt.) Schott	1856	Southeastern United States
	Arisaema ringens (Thunberg) Schott in Schott & Endlicher	1832	China(Jiangsu, Taiwan, Zhejiang), Japan, Korea
	Arisaema sachalinense (Miyabe & Kudô) J.Murata	1986	Japan (N. Hokkaido)
	Arisaema sazensoo (Blume) Makino	1901	Japan (Kyushu, Yakushima).
	Arisaema seppikoense Kitam.	1949	Japan (Honshu)
	Arisaema serratum (Thunb.) Schott	1832	Korea, Kuril Islands to Japan.
	Arisaema sikokianum Franch. & Sav.	1878	Japan (S. Honshu, Shikoku)
	Arisaema stewardsonii Britton	1901	Eastern Canada, Northeastern United States
	Arisaema tashiroi Kitam.	1941	Japan (Kyushu)
	Arisaema ternatipartitum Makino	1901	Japan (S. Honshu, Shikoku, N. Kyushu).
	Arisaema tosaense Makino	1901	Japan (W. Honshu, Shikoku, Kyushu)
	Arisaema triphyllum (L.) Schott	1832	Central & E. Canada to Central & E. U.S.A.
	Arisaema undulatifolium Nakai	1929	Japan (Honshu, Shikoku)
	Arisaema xuanweiense H.Li	2000	China (Yunnan).
	Arisaema yamatense (Nakai) Nakai	1929	Japan (Honshu)
