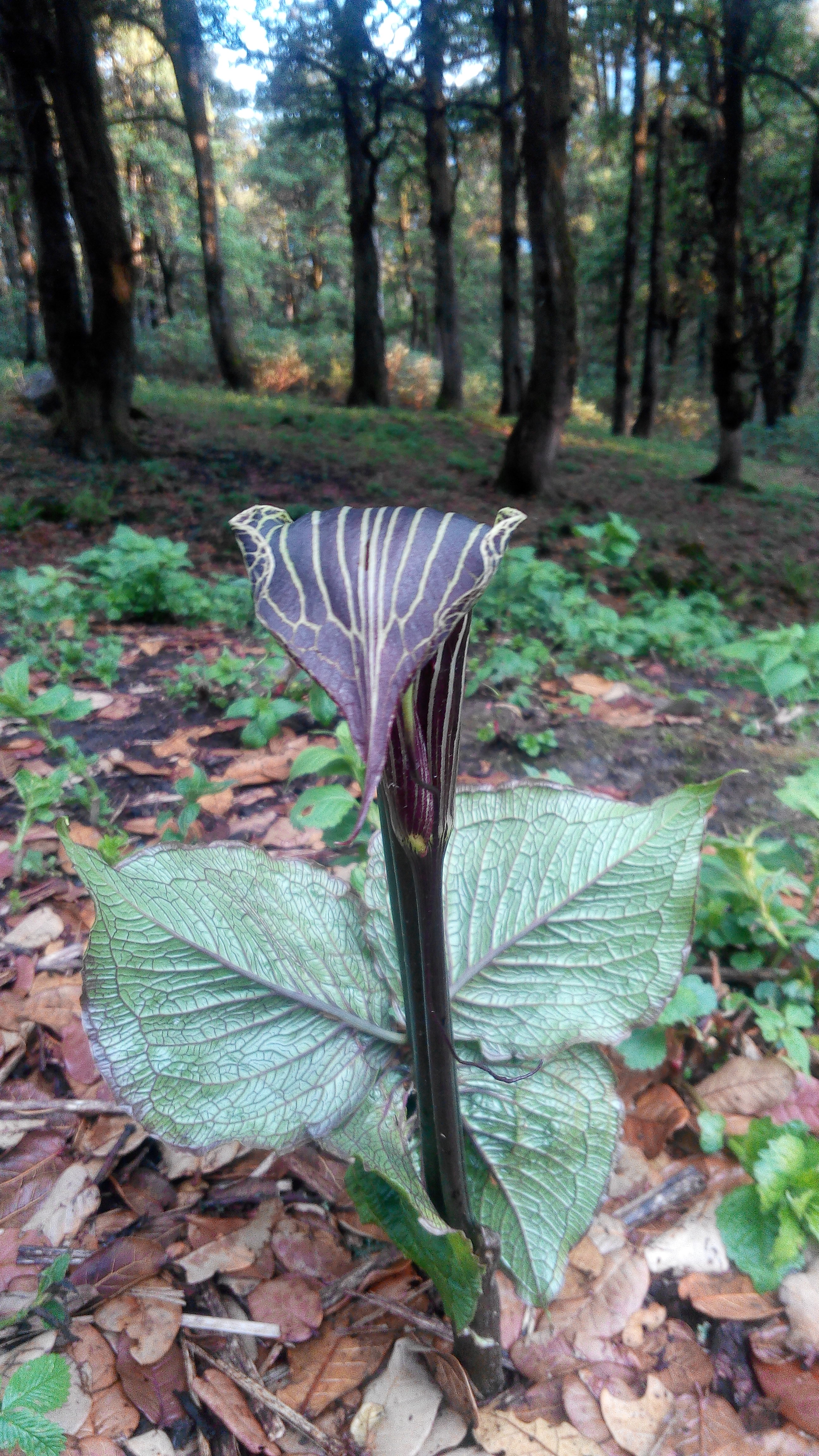
- Arisaema speciosum

Scientific classification
- Kingdom: Plantae
- Clade: Tracheophytes
- Clade: Angiosperms
- Clade: Monocots
- Order: Alismatales
- Family: Araceae
- Genus: Arisaema
- Section: Arisaema sect. Arisaema; Li et al. 2010

Type species
- Arisaema speciosum

Species
- See text

= Arisaema sect. Arisaema =

Subgenus of flowering plants

Arisaema section Arisaema is a section of the genus Arisaema.

== Description ==
Plants in this section are deciduous with a stem tuber with roots around the base. Leaves solitary, rarely two; trifoliate. Fruiting peduncle erect.

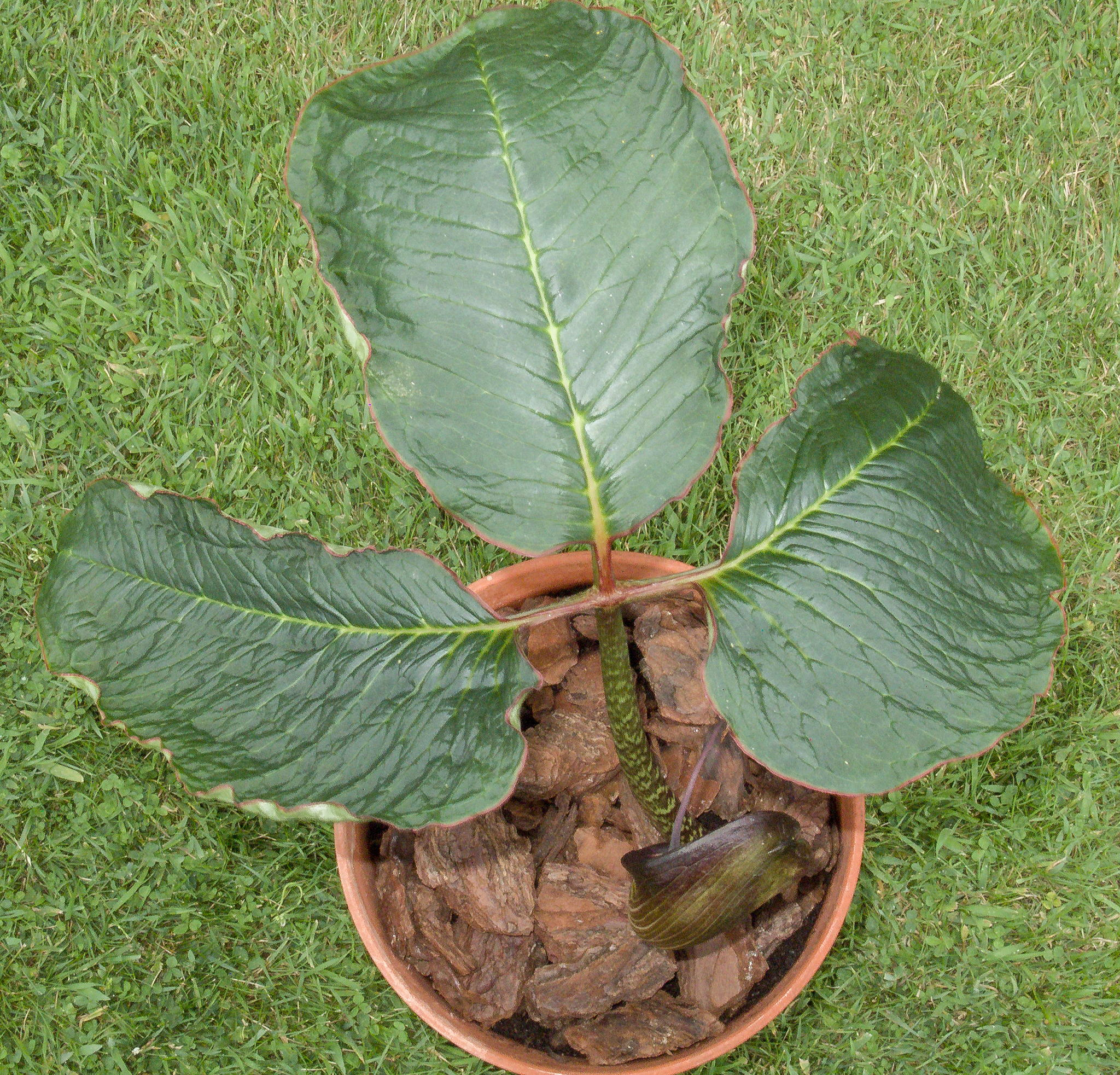
trifoliate leaf from A. speciosum

== Distribution ==
Plants from this section are found in the Himalayas from India, Bhutan and Nepal to Southwestern China and Myanmar.

== Species ==
Arisaema section Arisaema comprises the following species:

| Image | Name | Year | Distribution |
|---|---|---|---|
| | Arisaema anatinum Brugg. | 2018 | India (Arunachal Pradesh) |
| | Arisaema asperatum N. E. Brown | 1903 | China (Gansu, Henan, Hubei, Hunan, Shanxi, Sichuan) |
| | Arisaema bonatianum Engler | 1920 | China (Sichuan, Yunnan) |
| | Arisaema brucei H. Li, R. Li & J. Murata | 2010 | China (Yunnan) |
| | Arisaema burmaense P.C.Boyce & H.Li | 1999 | China (Yunnan), Myanmar |
| | Arisaema costatum (Wallich) Martius ex Schott & Endliche | 1832 | China (Xizang), Nepal |
| | Arisaema dahaiense H. Li | 1977 | China (Yunnan), Myanmar |
| | Arisaema elephas Buchet | 1911 | China (Gansu, Guizhou, Sichuan, Xizang, Yunnan), Bhutan, Myanmar |
| | Arisaema galeatum N.E.Br. | 1879 | India (Assam, Sikkim), China (Xizang), Myanmar, |
| | Arisaema griffithii Schott | 1856 | China (Xizang), Nepal, India (Darjeeling) |
| | Arisaema handelii Stapf ex Handel-Mazzetti | 1936 | China (Xizang, Yunnan) |
| | Arisaema intermedium Blume | 1835 | China (Xizang, Yunnan), India (Darjeeling, Himachal Pradesh, Uttarakhand, Kashmir), Nepal |
| | Arisaema lingyunense H. Li | 1977 | China (Guangxi), Myanmar |
| | Arisaema parvum N. E. Brown | 1893 | China (Xizang, Yunnan, Sichuan) |
| | Arisaema pianmaense H.Li | 1992 | China (Yunnan), Myanmar. |
| | Arisaema propinquum Schott | 1857 | China (Xizang), India, Nepal, Pakistan |
| | Arisaema schimperianum Schott | 1859 | Zaire, Ethiopia, Sudan, Uganda |
| | Arisaema speciosum (Wallich) Martius ex Schott & Endlicher | 1832 | China (Xizang), Bhutan, India, Nepal |
| | Arisaema tengtsungense H. Li | 1977 | China (Yunnan), Myanmar |
| | Arisaema utile J. D. Hooker ex Schott | 1860 | China (Xizang, Yunnan), Bhutan, India (Kashmir), Myanmar, Nepal, Pakistan |
| | Arisaema vexillatum H. Hara & H. Ohashi | 1973 | China (Xizang), Nepal |
| | Arisaema wilsonii Engler | 1920 | China (Gansu, Xizang, Sichuan, Yunnan) |
