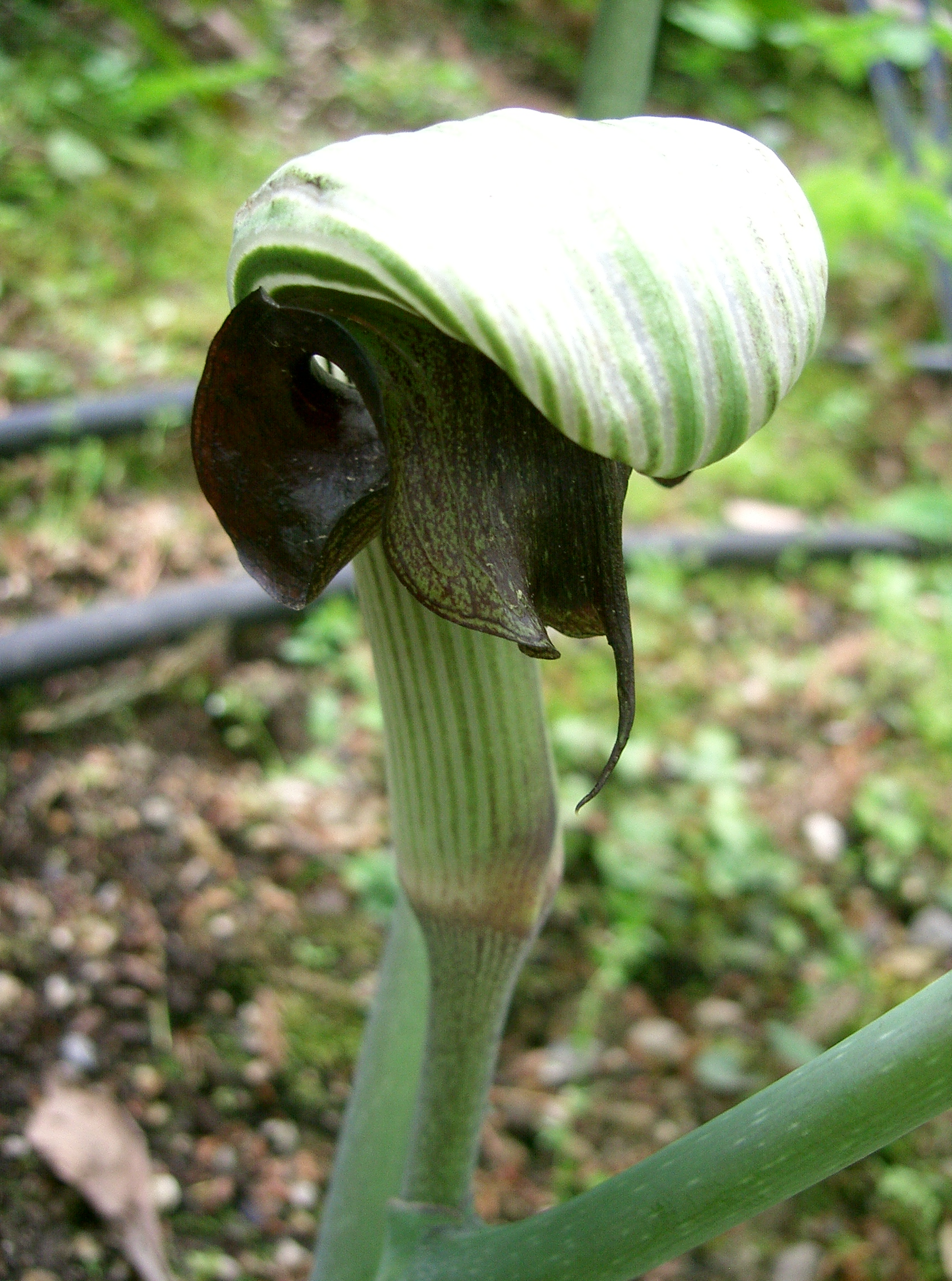
- Flower
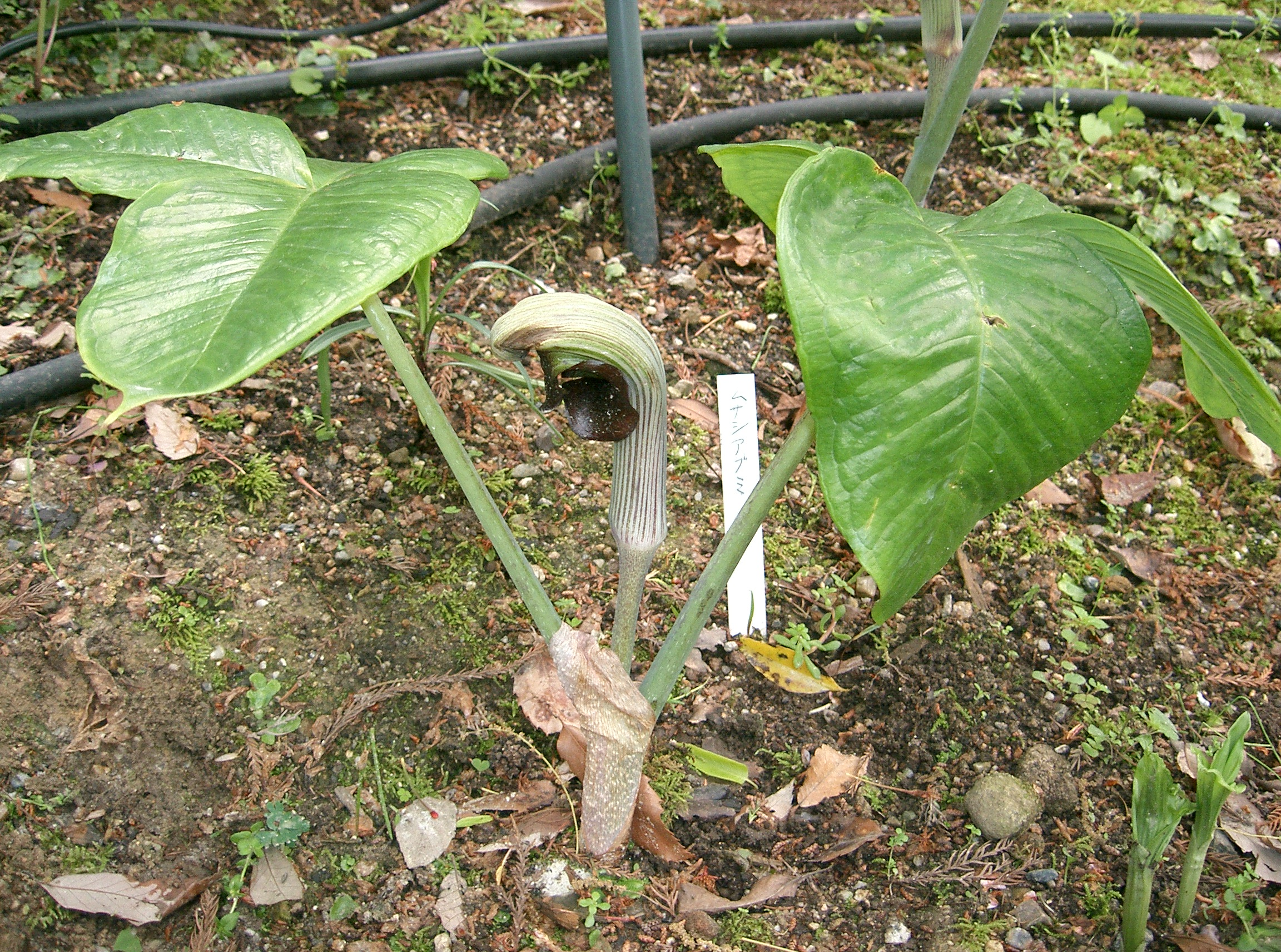
- Habit

Scientific classification
- Kingdom: Plantae
- Clade: Tracheophytes
- Clade: Angiosperms
- Clade: Monocots
- Order: Alismatales
- Family: Araceae
- Genus: Arisaema
- Species: A. ringens

Binomial name
- Arisaema ringens (Thunb.) Schott

Synonyms
- List: Alocasia ringens (Thunb.) Raf.; Arisaema arisanensis Hayata; Arisaema glaucescens (Nakai) Nakai; Arisaema glaucescens var. viridiflorum Nakai; Arisaema praecox de Vriese ex K.Koch; Arisaema ringens var. glaucescens Nakai; Arisaema ringens var. praecox (de Vriese ex K.Koch) Engl.; Arisaema ringens var. sieboldii (de Vriese ex K.Koch) Engl.; Arisaema ringens var. viridiflorum Nakai; Arisaema serotinum Miq. ex Franch. & Sav.; Arisaema sieboldii de Vriese ex K.Koch; Arisaema sierotium Siebold ex Regel; Arisaema taihokense Hosok.; Arum ringens Thunb.; Ringentiarum glaucescens (Nakai) Nakai; Ringentiarum ringens (Thunb.) Nakai; Ringentiarum ringens var. sieboldii (de Vriese ex K.Koch) Nakai

= Arisaema ringens =

Species of plant

Arisaema ringens, the Japanese cobra lily (a name it shares with Arisaema sikokianum), is a species of flowering plant in the family Araceae, native to the Zhoushan Islands of China, Taiwan, South Korea, central Japan, and the Ryukyu Islands. A tuberous geophyte reaching 45 cm (18 in), in the wild they are found at low elevations in forests. A dioecious species, it is pollinated by flies. In the garden it needs moist, humus-rich soil, and is hardy in USDA zones 6 through 9.

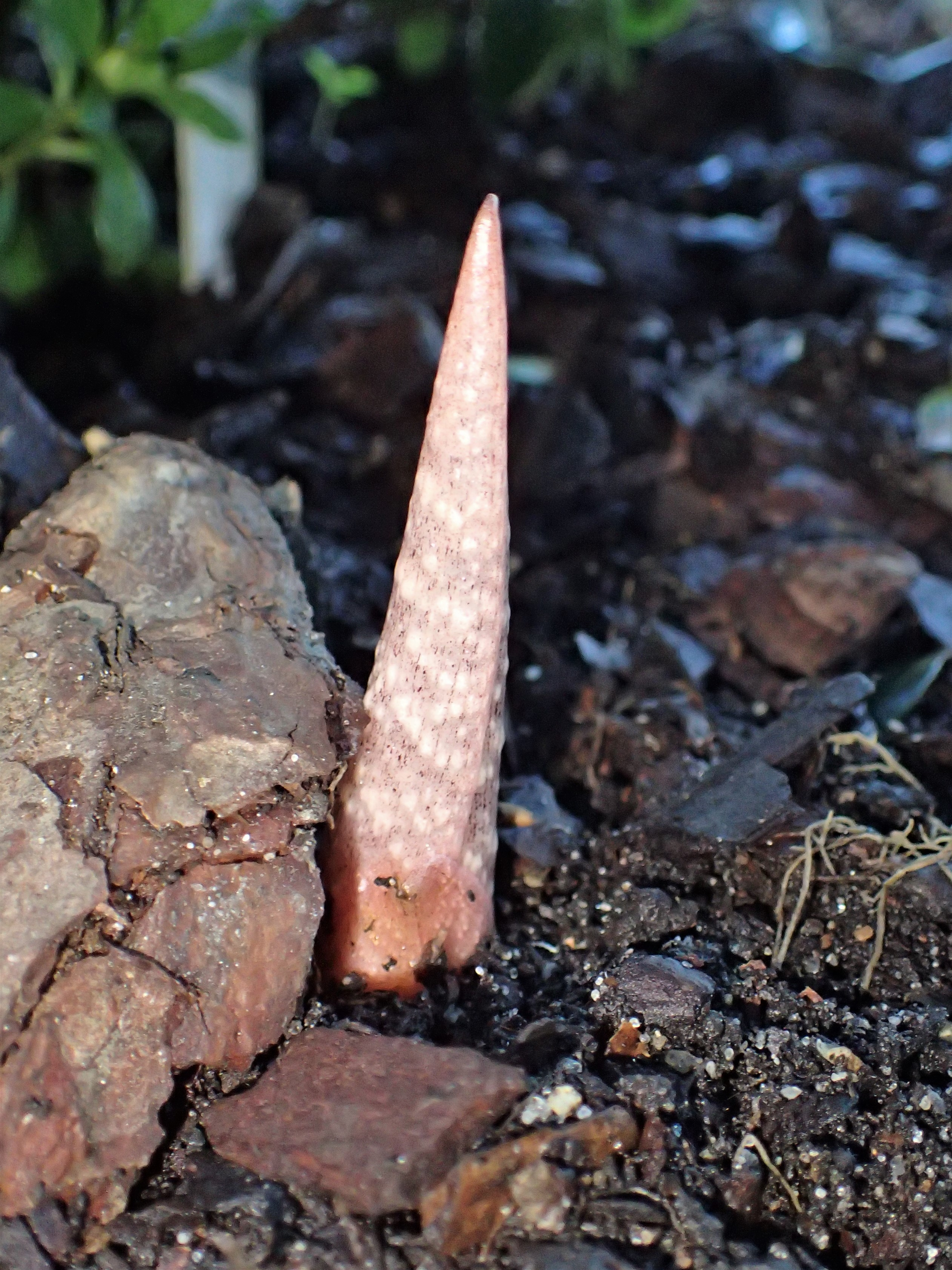
Sprouting

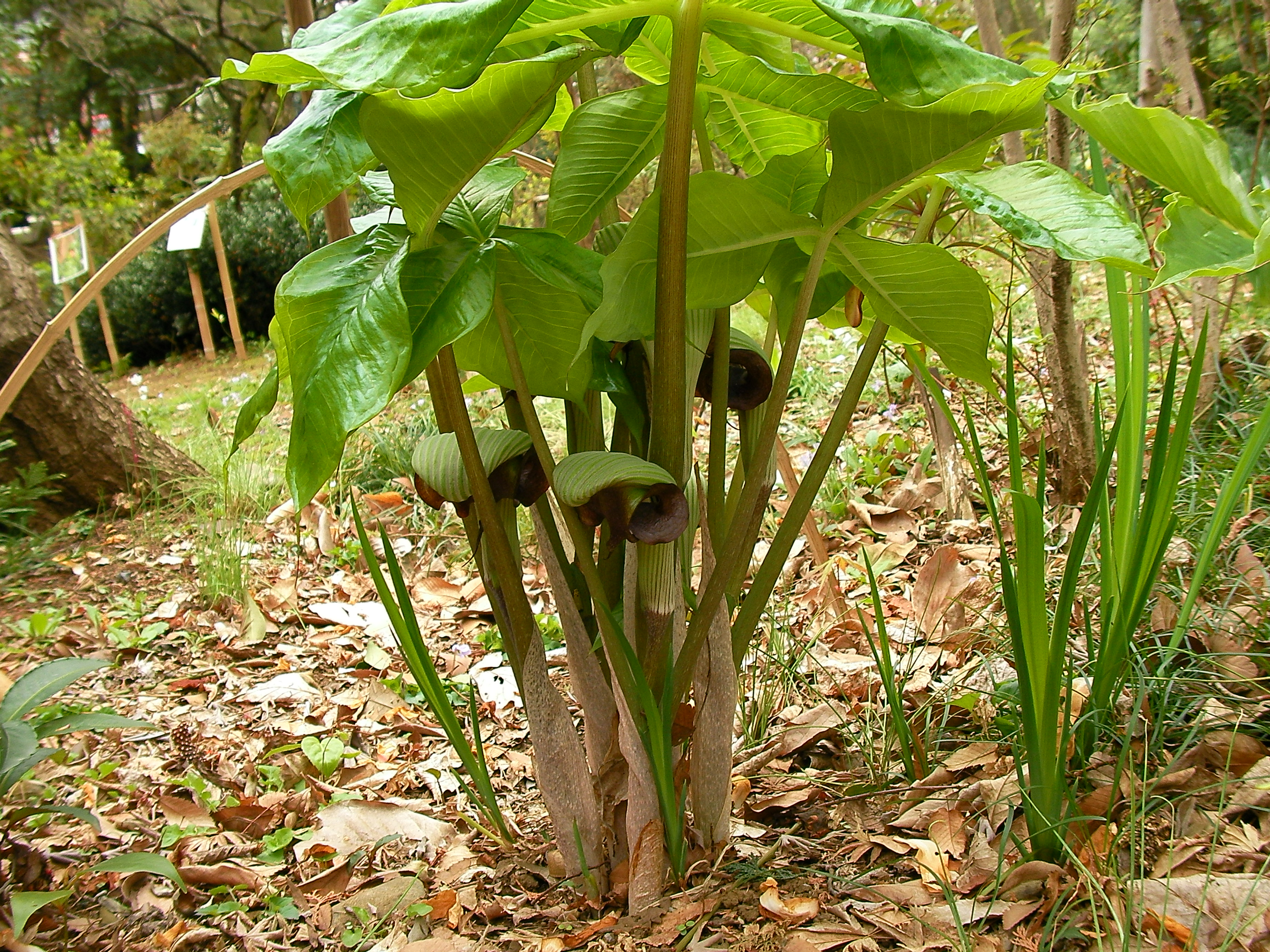
Flowers under canopy

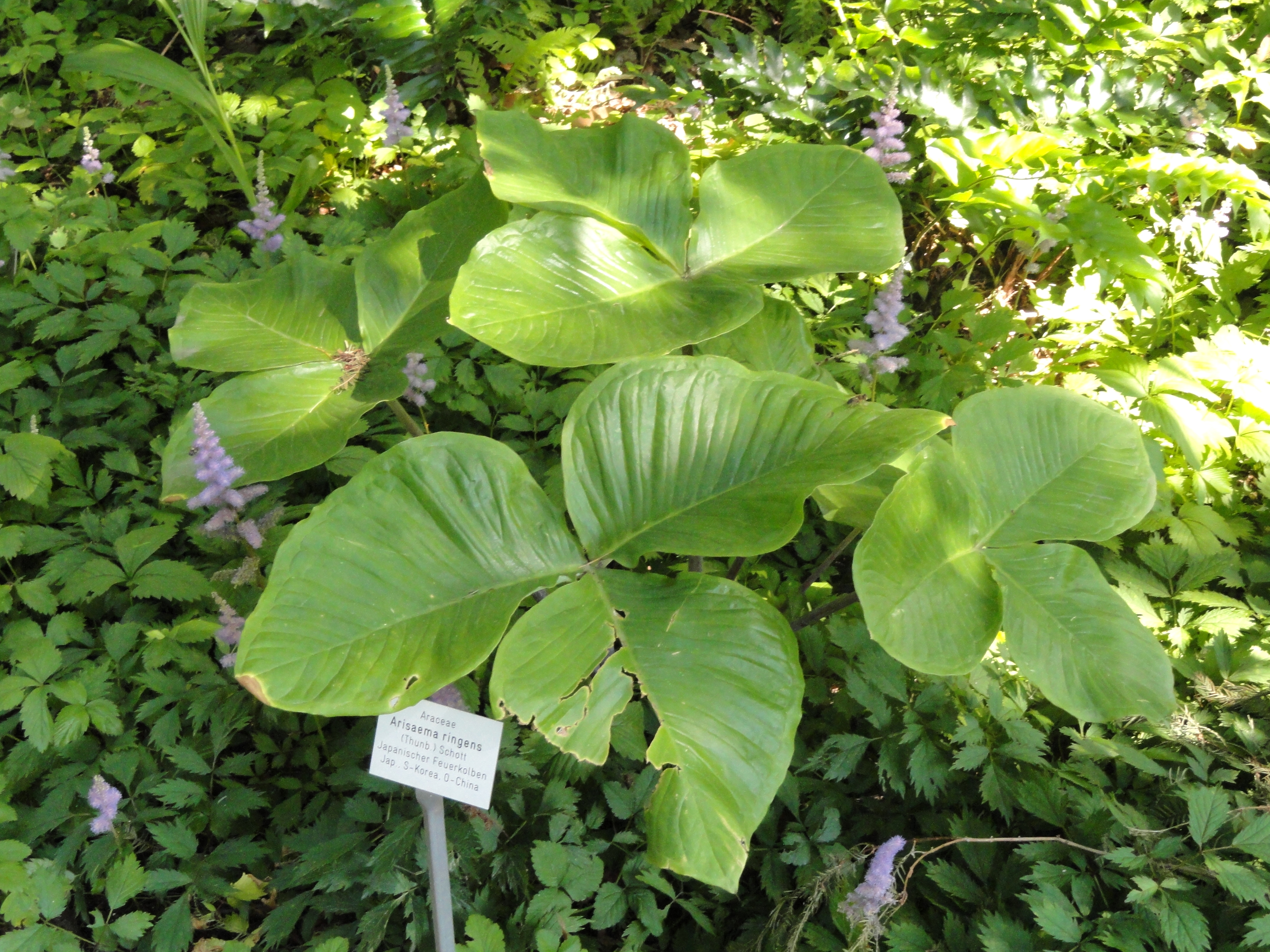
From above

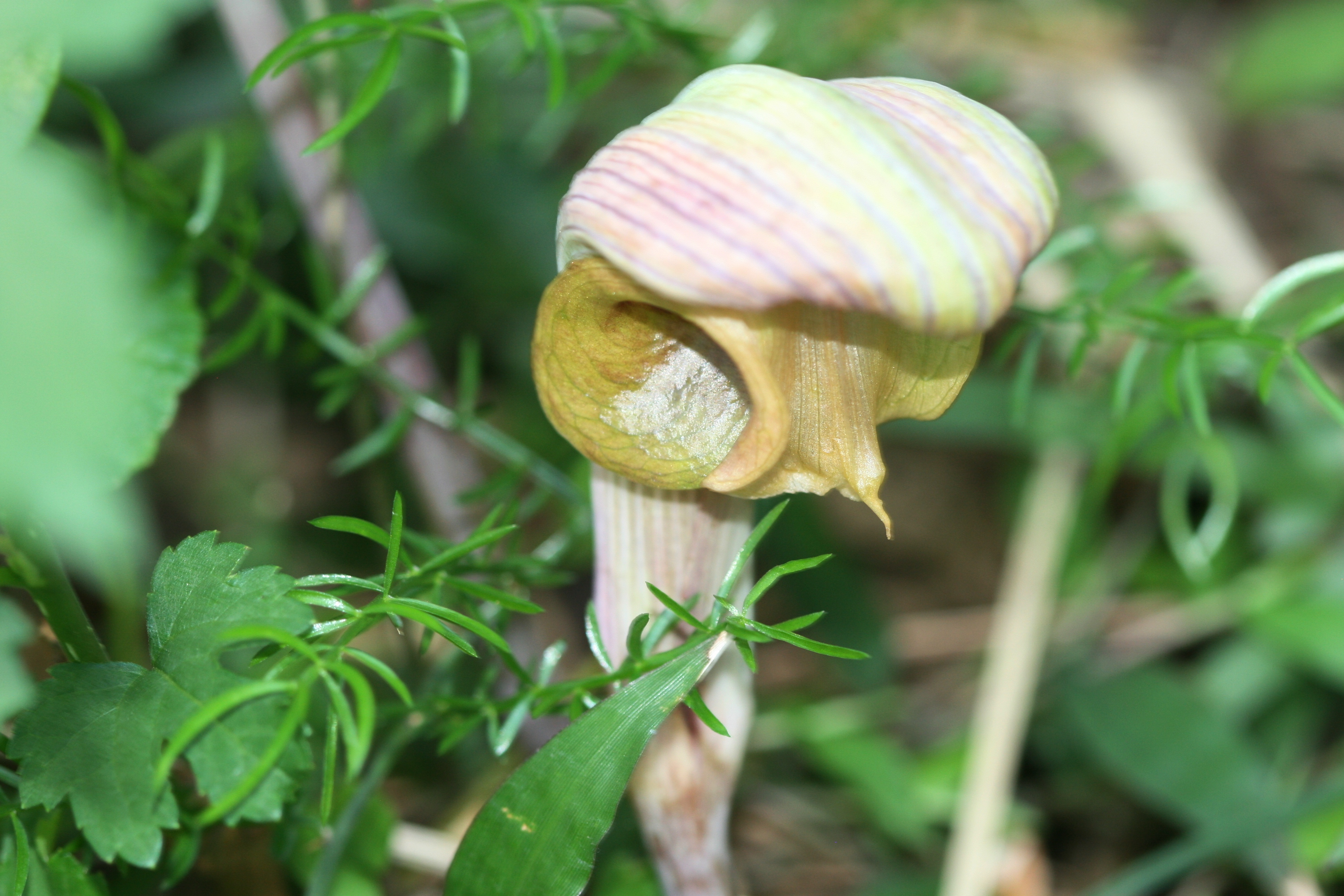
A greener morph

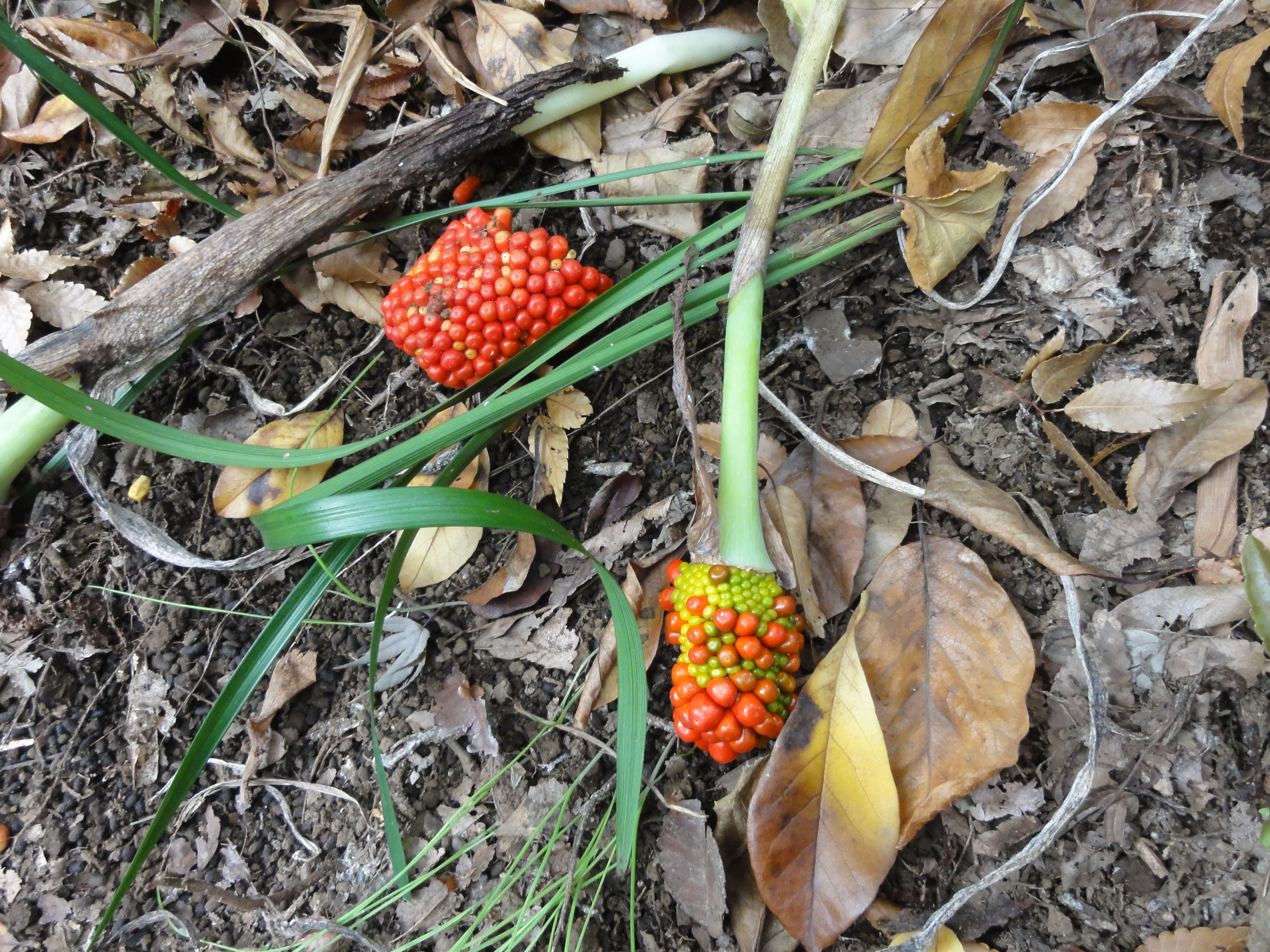
Fruit
