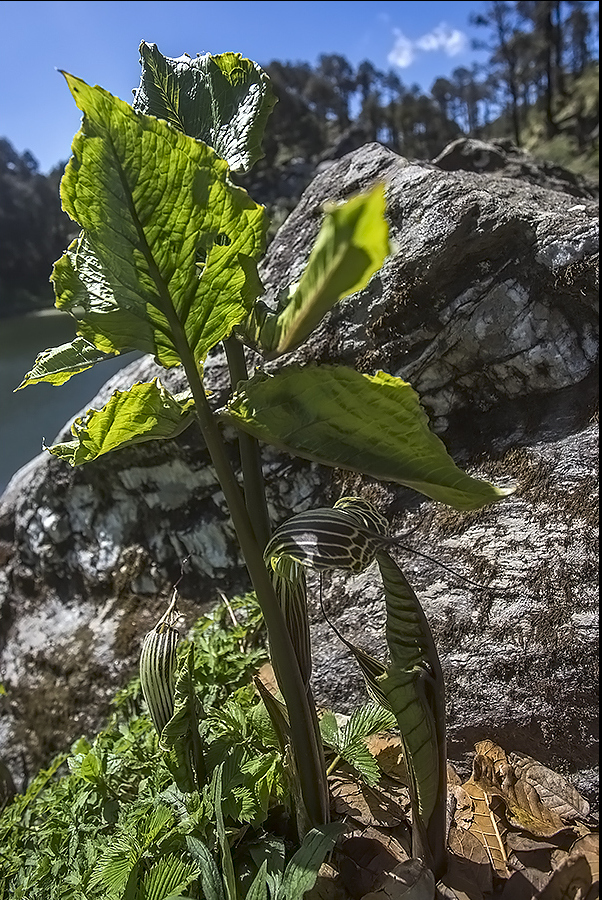
- Wallach's cobra lily near Shoja, Himachal Pradesh

Scientific classification
- Kingdom: Plantae
- Clade: Tracheophytes
- Clade: Angiosperms
- Clade: Monocots
- Order: Alismatales
- Family: Araceae
- Genus: Arisaema
- Species: A. propinquum

Binomial name
- Arisaema propinquum Schott

Synonyms
- Arisaema wallichianum Hook.f.

= Arisaema propinquum =

Wallach's cobra lily

Species of flowering plant

Arisaema propinquum, or Wallach's cobra lily, is a species of flowering plant the family Araceae. Arisaema propinquum occurs in the Himalayas.

== Description ==
Wallach's cobra lily is a species with very good resemblance to a cobra hood. The plants grows up to 30 cm tall, with 1-2 very large, trilobed, yellowish green leaves. The spathe, or the cobra hood, is dark purple oblong-ovate, prominently striped with white or purple, and a nettled pattern in the upper part, and with a narrowed tail like tip, 1–4 cm long. Spadix is thick at the base, with a long thread like appendage 8–20 cm long. Leaf stalk and stem are often brown-spotted. Wallach's cobra lily is found in the Himalayas, from Kashmir to SE Tibet, at altitudes of 2400–3600 m. Flowering: May–June.
