= Arisaema griffithii =

Scientific classification
- Kingdom: Plantae
- Clade: Tracheophytes
- Clade: Angiosperms
- Clade: Monocots
- Order: Alismatales
- Family: Araceae
- Genus: Arisaema
- Species: A. griffithii

Binomial name
- Arisaema griffithii Schott

Synonyms
- Arisaema griffithii var. pradhanii (C.E.C.Fisch.) Pradhan; Arisaema griffithii var. verrucosum (Schott) H.Hara; Arisaema hookeri Schott; Arisaema hookerianum Schott; Arisaema pradhanii C.E.C.Fisch.; Arisaema verrucosum Schott

Species of plant

Arisaema griffithii, the coiled cobra lily or Griffith's cobra lily, is a species of flowering plant in the family Araceae. It is native to Tibet, Nepal, and the eastern Himalayas. A perennial reaching 60 cm (24 in), it has a dramatically patterned green and purple spathe. It is available from commercial suppliers.
