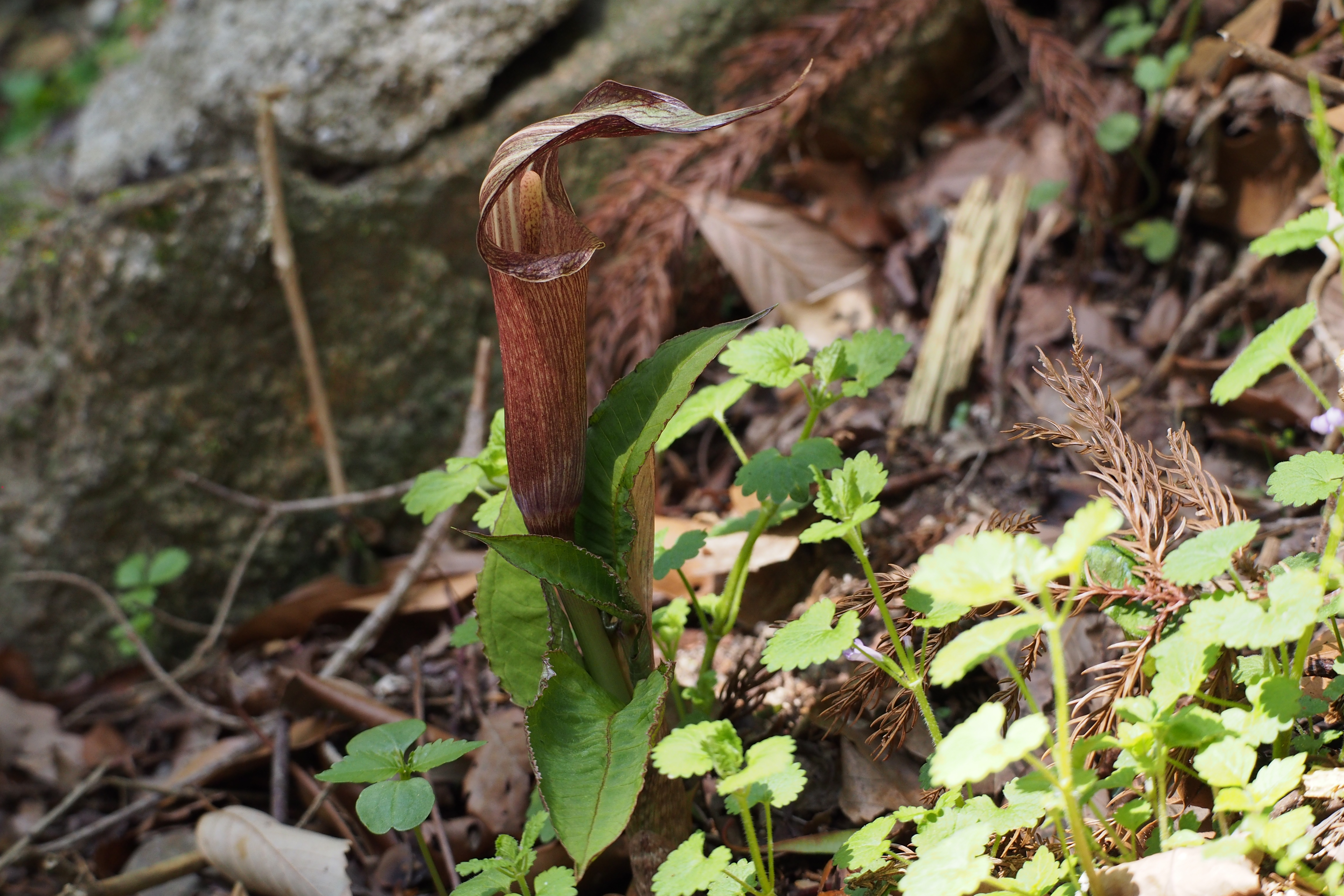

Scientific classification
- Kingdom: Plantae
- Clade: Tracheophytes
- Clade: Angiosperms
- Clade: Monocots
- Order: Alismatales
- Family: Araceae
- Genus: Arisaema
- Species: A. serratum

Binomial name
- Arisaema serratum (Thunb.) Schott

= Arisaema serratum =

Species of flowering plant

Arisaema serratum or Fuji cobra lily is a species of flowering plant in the arum family (Araceae). It is native to Japan, where it is found from the Kansai region north to the island of Hokkaido. Its natural habitat is damp forests.

Arisaema serratum is a perennial. It produces two leaves, with 7-13 leaflets each. The color of the flowering bract is variable, being either purple or green. It blooms from May to June.

It is similar to Arisaema mayebarae, which is restricted to Kyushu (an island where Arisaema serratum is not present). Arisaema serratum can be distinguished by its shorter spathe blade, which declines over the tip of the mouth (as opposed to being held at a horizontal angle).

== Subspecies ==
- Arisaema serratum var. atropurpureum Engl.
- Arisaema serratum var. izuense (Nakai) Gusman & L.Gusman
- Arisaema serratum var. serratum
- Arisaema serratum var. suwoense (Nakai) H.Ohashi & J.Murata

== Toxicity ==
All parts of A. serratum contain needle-like calcium oxalate crystals, saponins, and coniine. Toxicity is especially concentrated in the underground bulb; touching the juice causes inflammation. Ingestion results in intense pain from the mouth to the throat, making it impossible to swallow. Symptoms include diarrhea, vomiting, and respiratory paralysis; severe cases can be fatal.
