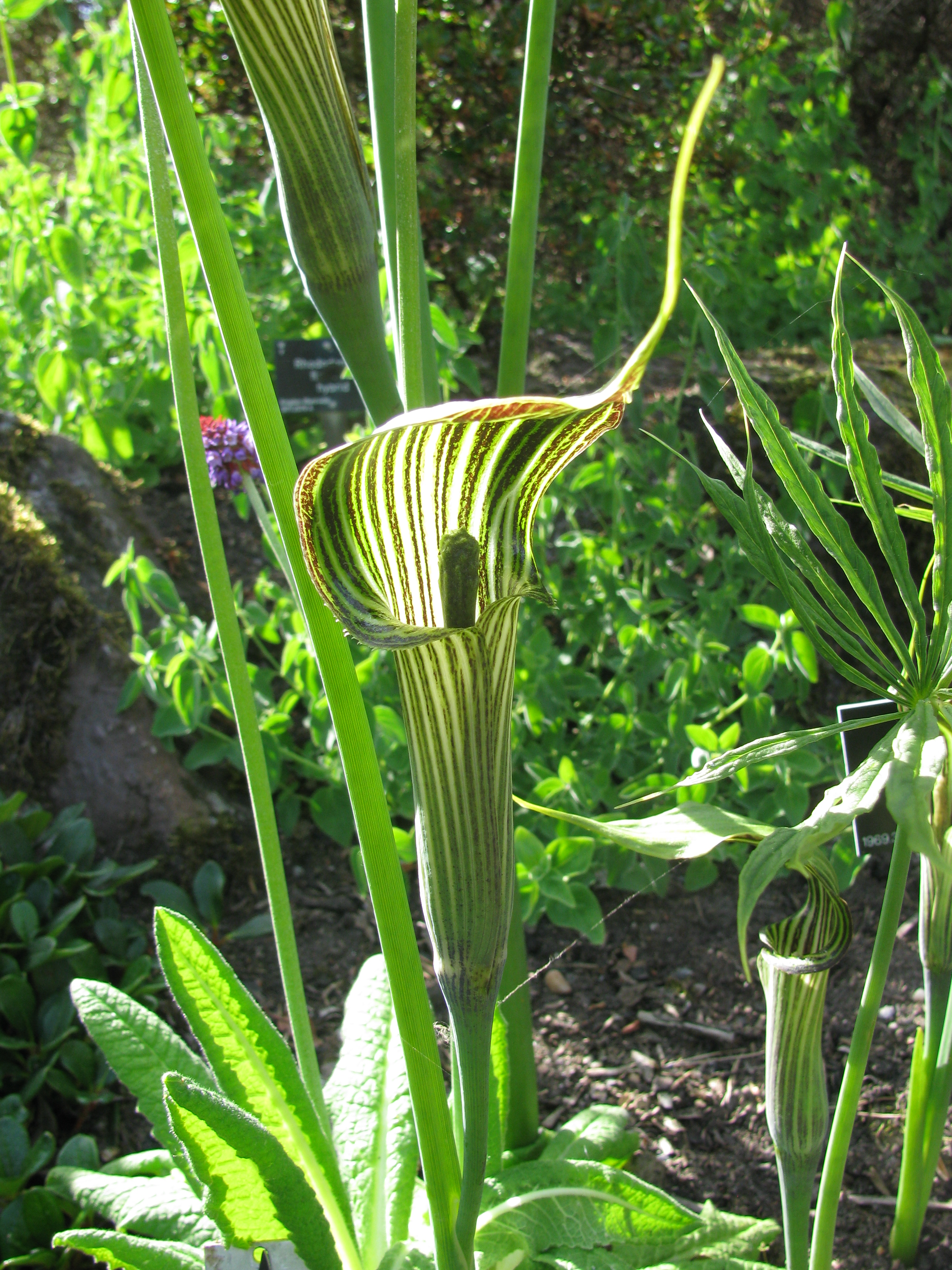

Scientific classification
- Kingdom: Plantae
- Clade: Tracheophytes
- Clade: Angiosperms
- Clade: Monocots
- Order: Alismatales
- Family: Araceae
- Genus: Arisaema
- Species: A. ciliatum

Binomial name
- Arisaema ciliatum H.Li

= Arisaema ciliatum =

Species of plant

Arisaema ciliatum is a plant species in the family Araceae. It is found in Lijang, Yunnan, China at elevations of 2500 meters.
