= Arisaema barnesii =

Scientific classification
- Kingdom: Plantae
- Clade: Tracheophytes
- Clade: Angiosperms
- Clade: Monocots
- Order: Alismatales
- Family: Araceae
- Genus: Arisaema
- Species: A. barnesii

Binomial name
- Arisaema barnesii C.E.C.Fisch.

Species of flowering plant

Arisaema barnesii is a species of flowering plant in the arum family (Araceae).

== Description ==
A medium-sized species of Arisaema characterized by a plain green leaf divided into three to seven leaflets. The spathe is green with broad white stripes and is typically displayed at the level of the leaves. Plants usually attain a height of 30–60 cm.
