= Arisaema attenuatum =

Scientific classification
- Kingdom: Plantae
- Clade: Tracheophytes
- Clade: Angiosperms
- Clade: Monocots
- Order: Alismatales
- Family: Araceae
- Genus: Arisaema
- Species: A. attenuatum

Binomial name
- Arisaema attenuatum E.Barnes & C.E.C.Fisch.

Species of flowering plant

Arisaema attenuatum is a species of flowering plant in the arum family (Araceae).

== Description ==
Plants exceeding 40 cm in height; spathe limb triangular or narrowly lanceolate, green in color with a prominent white patch at the base; spadix appendix tapering gradually into a thread-like tip lacking a knob.
