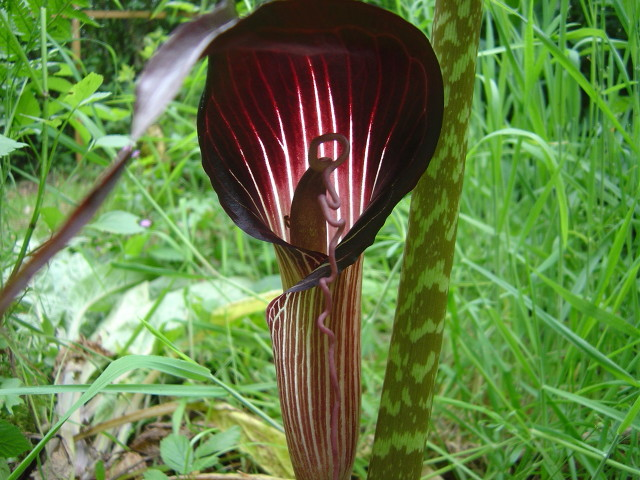
- In cultivation

Scientific classification
- Kingdom: Plantae
- Clade: Embryophytes
- Clade: Tracheophytes
- Clade: Spermatophytes
- Clade: Angiosperms
- Clade: Monocots
- Order: Alismatales
- Family: Araceae
- Genus: Arisaema
- Species: A. speciosum

Binomial name
- Arisaema speciosum (Wall.) Mart.

Synonyms
- Arum speciosum Wall.

= Arisaema speciosum =

Species of plant in the arum family

Arisaema speciosum is a species of flowering plant in the family Araceae, native to Nepal, East Himalaya, Assam, Tibet and south-central China.

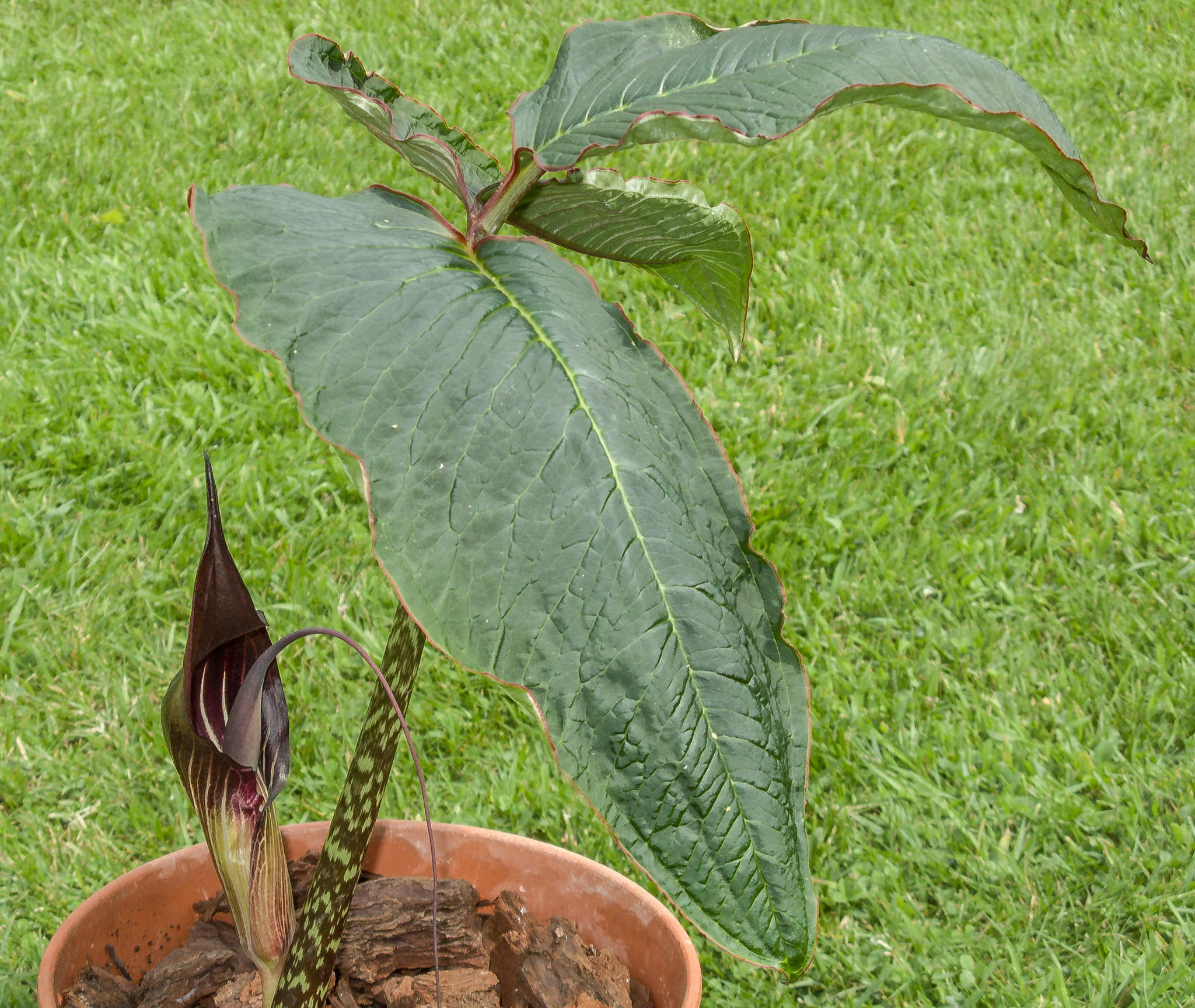
Pot-grown specimen

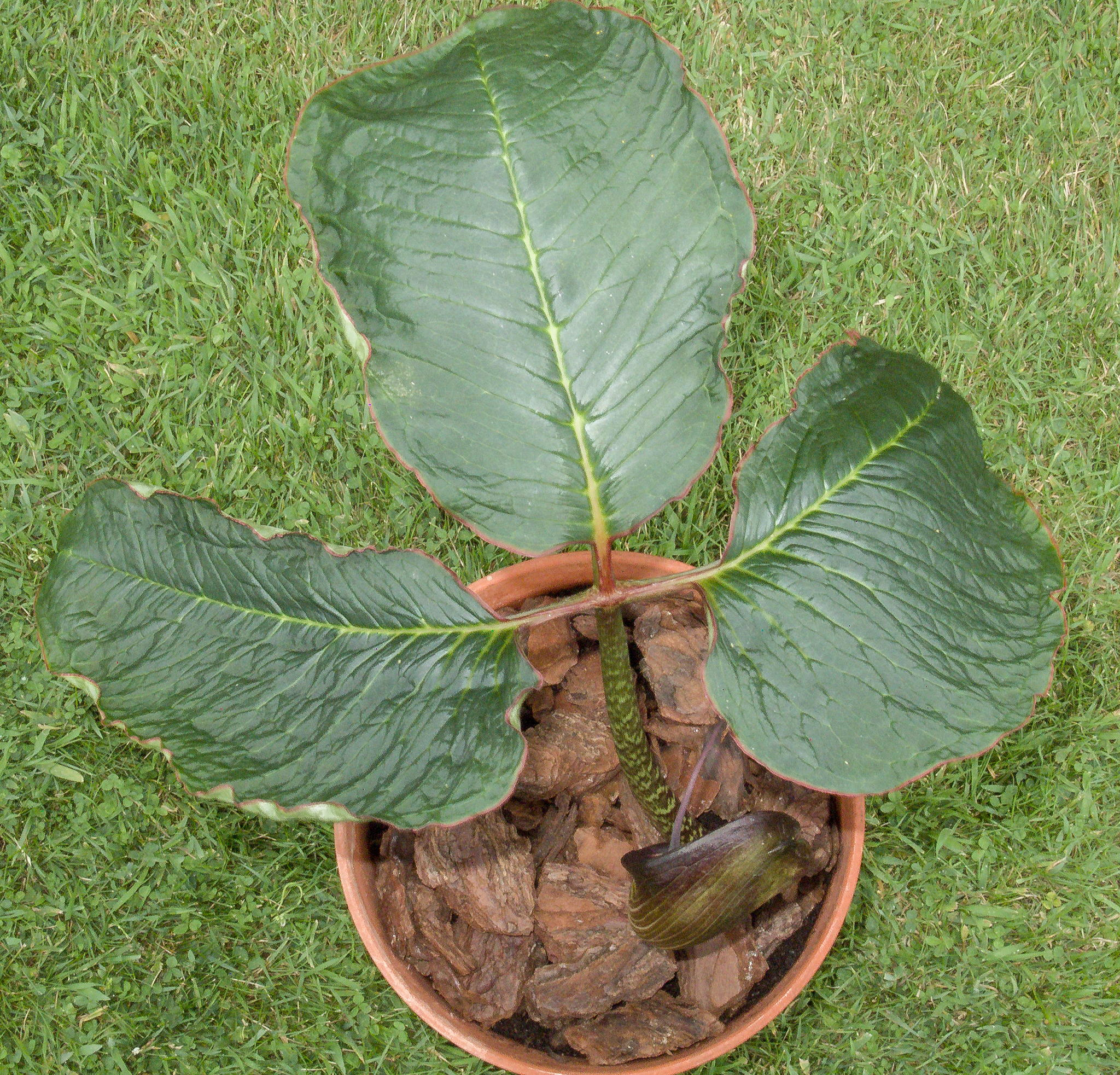
From above

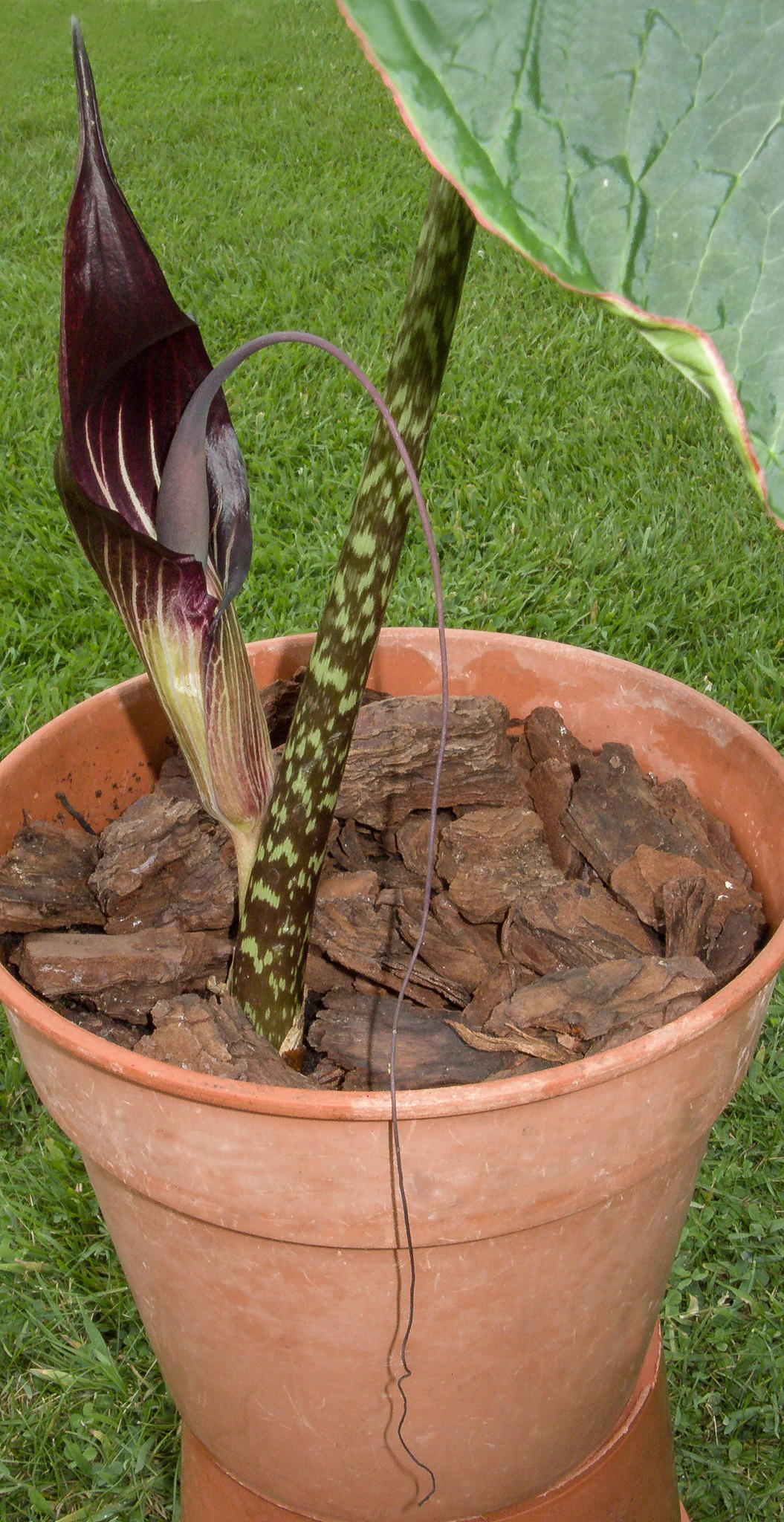
Showing long filament

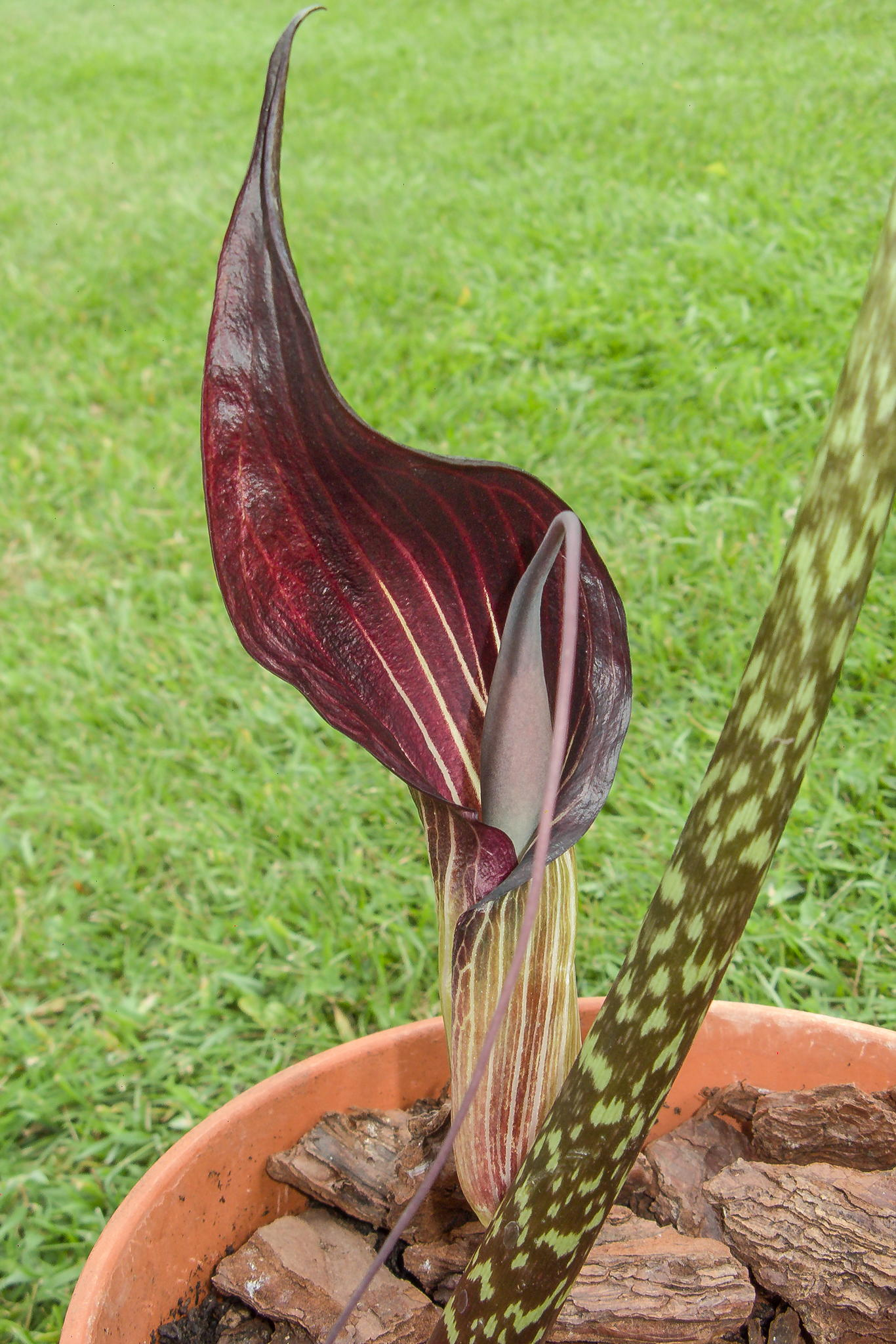
Inflorescence
