= Arisaema translucens =

Scientific classification
- Kingdom: Plantae
- Clade: Tracheophytes
- Clade: Angiosperms
- Clade: Monocots
- Order: Alismatales
- Family: Araceae
- Genus: Arisaema
- Species: A. translucens

Binomial name
- Arisaema translucens C.E.C.Fisch.

Species of flowering plant

Arisaema translucens, the translucent cobra lily, is a species of flowering plant in the family Araceae.

== Description ==
Perennial, dioecious herbs with a pseudostem reaching up to 30 cm in height. The underground stem is a subglobose tuber measuring 2–2.5 × 3–4 cm, whitish to pale yellow in colour, with pale purple roots. There are three cataphylls: the inner one 8.5–10 cm long with an obtuse apex and pale purple hue, and the outer ones 4–5 cm long with obtuse apices. The plant bears a single radiate leaf; the petiole, 20–30 cm long, is pale purple with brown and white mottlings. Leaflets number 9–11, lanceolate to oblong-oblanceolate, with blades 8–15 × 2–3.5 cm, attenuate at the base, acuminate at the apex, margins entire to slightly revolute, glabrous, pale green above, and glossy beneath.

Inflorescence is dioecious, extending to about half the height of the pseudostem. The peduncle, 12–14 × 0.2–0.8 cm, broadens towards the top and is light yellow-pink. The spathe, 7.5–9 cm long including the limb, has a cylindrical tube 3–3.2 × 1.2–1.5 cm, cucullate at the mouth, marked with about 30 longitudinal stripes. The mouth is obcordate to obovate, ending in a caudate apex with a filiform, deflexed tail up to 2.5 cm long.

The male spadix is sessile, about 4.5 cm long, with a fertile region 1.9 × 0.3–0.4 cm, tapering distally, and a sessile appendix about 2.5 × 0.2–0.3 cm, narrowing towards the tip and pale purple in colour. Male flowers are distinctly stipitate, with stipes 1–1.5 mm long; anthers 2–6, measuring 0.5–0.7 × 0.6–0.8 mm, reniform, purple, laxly arranged, and dehiscing through apical slits.

The female spadix is sessile and cylindrical, longer than the spathe tube, with an appendix up to 5 cm long, stipitate, green with light purple streaks, cylindrical at the base and tapering to a white apex. Neuter flowers, about 5 mm long, are located above the fertile zone and point upwards. Fruit not observed.

== Phenology ==
Flowering: April–June.
