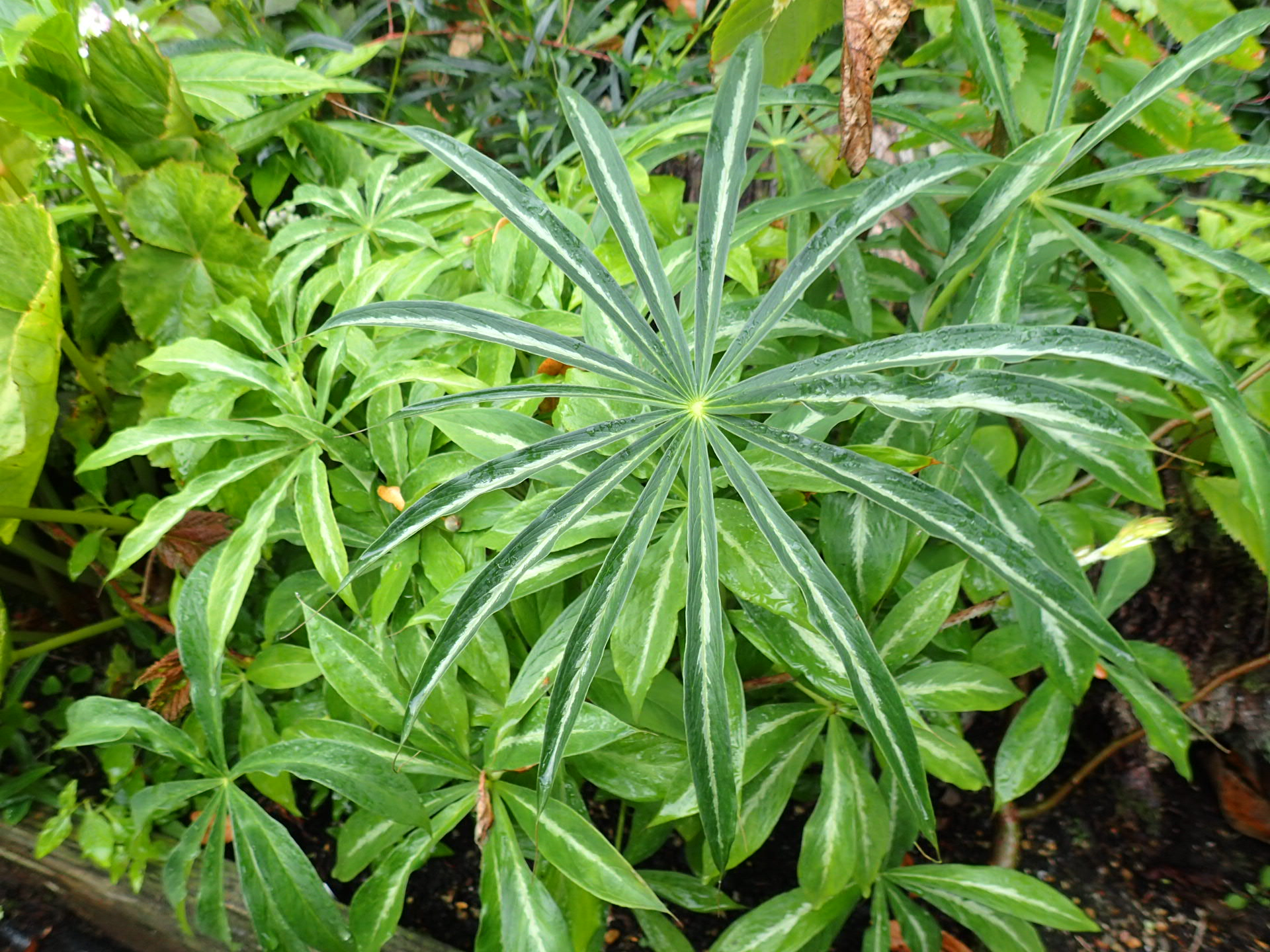

Scientific classification
- Kingdom: Plantae
- Clade: Tracheophytes
- Clade: Angiosperms
- Clade: Monocots
- Order: Alismatales
- Family: Araceae
- Genus: Arisaema
- Species: A. consanguineum

Binomial name
- Arisaema consanguineum Schott

Subspecies
- Arisaema consanguineum subsp. consanguineum; Arisaema consanguineum subsp. kelung-insulare (Hayata) Gusman

Synonyms
- Arisaema chuanxiense Z.Y.Zhu, B.Q.Min & S.J.Zhu 2011

= Arisaema consanguineum =

Species of plant

Arisaema consanguineum, the Himalayan cobra lily, is a species of flowering plant in the arum lily family Araceae. It is a tuberous perennial native to the Himalayas, Indochina, and China. A single stem, 1 m (3.3 ft) tall, bears a deciduous leaf with multiple radial leaflets. The flower is a deep maroon hooded spathe striped green and white. It appears in summer, and is followed by a cluster of bright red berries in autumn.

It is cultivated as an ornamental plant for a permanently damp, partially shaded or fully shaded, sheltered spot, such as a woodland setting. Though hardy to −5 °C (23 °F), the tuber may require protection during winter.

It is reported to cause skin irritation if handled, and gastrointestinal irritation if ingested.

== Distribution ==
It occurs in China, Taiwan, India, Myanmar, Bhutan, Nepal and Thailand.

== Subspecies ==
Two subspecies are accepted.

- Arisaema consanguineum subsp. consanguineum – Himalayas (northern India, Nepal, Bhutan) to China and Indochina
- Arisaema consanguineum subsp. kelung-insulare (Hayata) Gusman – Taiwan
