= Arisaema sarracenioides =

Scientific classification
- Kingdom: Plantae
- Clade: Tracheophytes
- Clade: Angiosperms
- Clade: Monocots
- Order: Alismatales
- Family: Araceae
- Genus: Arisaema
- Species: A. sarracenioides

Binomial name
- Arisaema sarracenioides E.Barnes & C.E.C.Fisch.

Species of flowering plant

Arisaema sarracenioides is a species of flowering plant belonging to the family Araceae.

== Description ==
Deciduous, dioecious, succulent perennial herb, about 70 cm tall. The plant bears a tuberous, depressed-globose corm (2.5–4 cm diameter), yellow to greenish-yellow inside, often producing offsets. Leaf solitary, radiatisect, with 5–7 elliptic-obovate to oblanceolate leaflets on a long, mottled petiole (40–70 cm). Inflorescence arises below the leaf; spathe 18–22 cm long, white with purple stripes, and a cucullate limb ending in a short tail. Spadix with distinct male and female forms; female spadix conical with compact green pistils, male spadix slender with purple anthers. Fruiting spike cylindrical, borne on an erect peduncle with compact berries.

== Distribution ==
Southern Western Ghats.

== Phenology ==
Flowering & fruiting: May–October.
