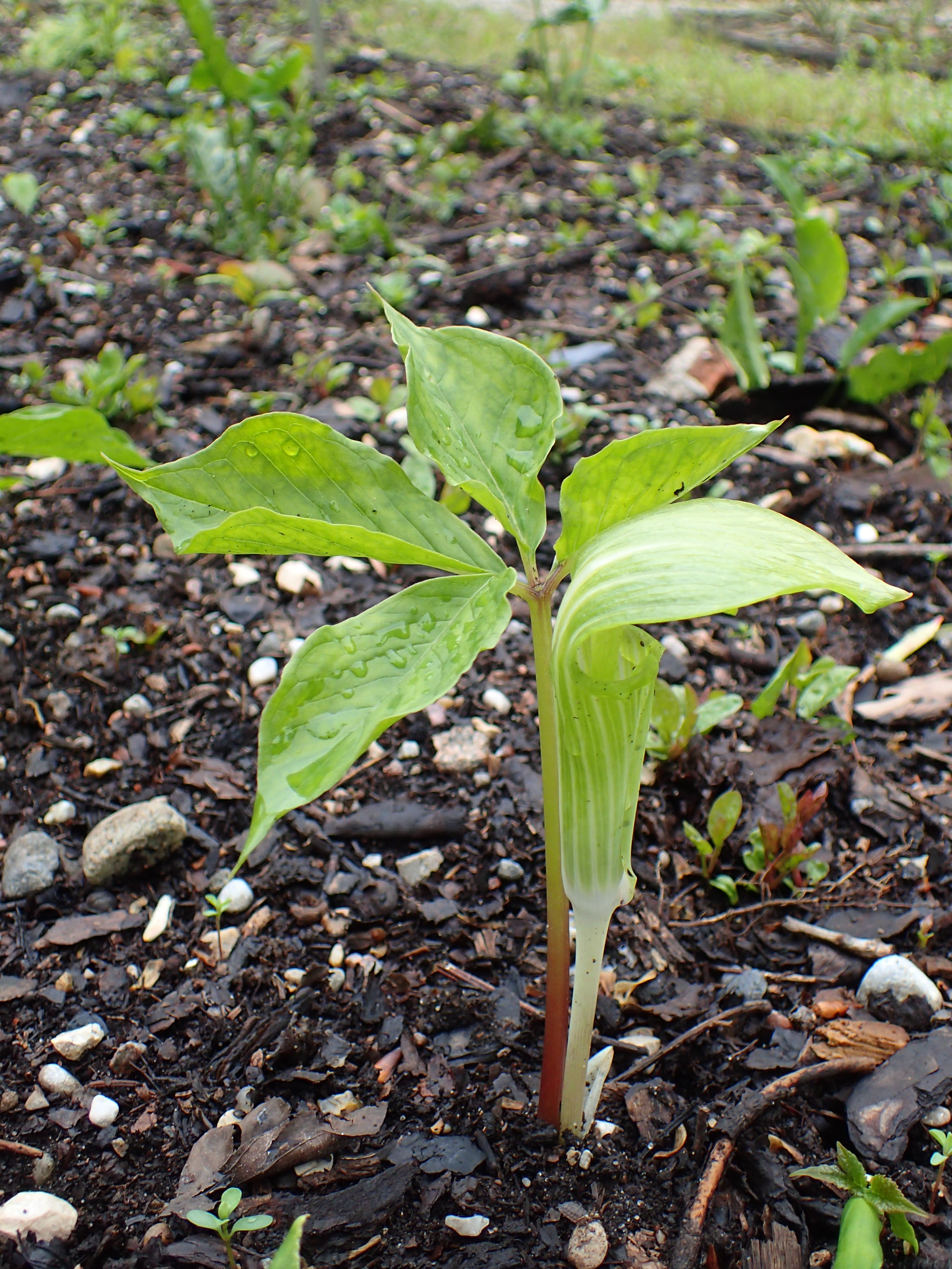
- Habit

Scientific classification
- Kingdom: Plantae
- Clade: Tracheophytes
- Clade: Angiosperms
- Clade: Monocots
- Order: Alismatales
- Family: Araceae
- Genus: Arisaema
- Species: A. amurense

Binomial name
- Arisaema amurense Maxim.

Synonyms
- List: Arisaema amurense var. denticulatum Engl.; Arisaema amurense var. magnidens N.E.Br.; Arisaema amurense var. purpureum Nakai; Arisaema amurense f. purpureum (Nakai) Kitag.; Arisaema amurense subsp. robustum (Engl.) H.Ohashi & J.Murata; Arisaema amurense var. robustum Engl.; Arisaema amurense var. serratum Nakai; Arisaema amurense f. serratum (Nakai) Kitag.; Arisaema amurense var. violaceum Engl.; Arisaema amurense f. violaceum (Engl.) Y.S.Kim & S.C.Ko; Arisaema komarovii Tzvelev; Arisaema robustum (Engl.) Nakai; Arisaema robustum f. atropurpureum T.Koyama; Arisaema robustum var. purpureum Nakai; Arisaema robustum var. sachalinense Miyabe & Kudô; Arisaema robustum f. variegatum Y.N.Lee

= Arisaema amurense =

- Flower

Species of plant

Arisaema amurense, the tian nan xing, is a species of flowering plant in the family Araceae. It is native to the southern Russian Far East, the Korean Peninsula, and eastern China. A highly variable perennial reaching 30 cm (12 in), it is found in a variety of forested habitats, typically by streams, at elevations from 50 to 200 m (160 to 660 ft) above sea level. Its tubers are collected in the wild and used in traditional Chinese medicine.

An individual with an especially marked difference between the height of the flower and of the leaves

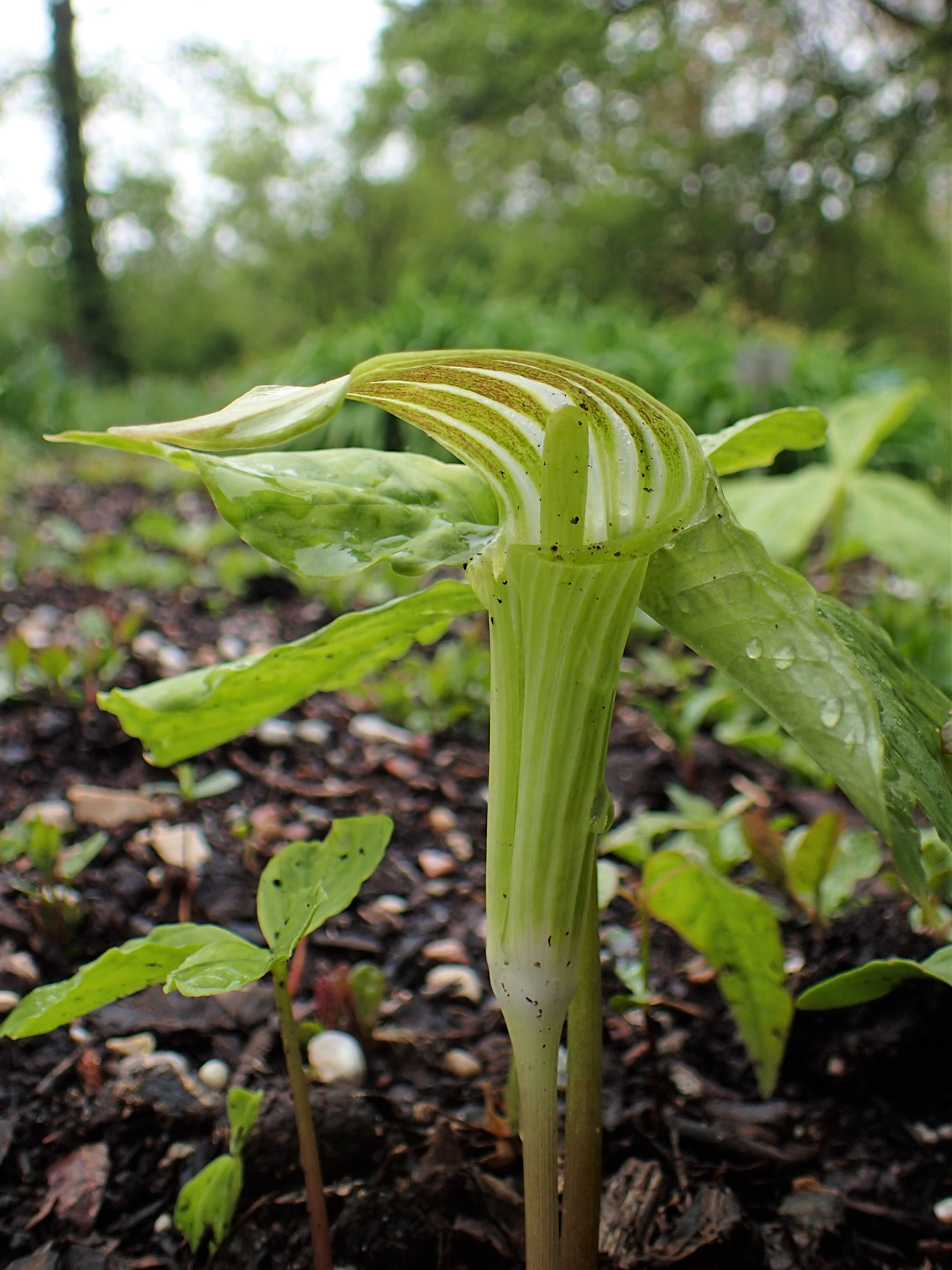
At the University of Warsaw Botanical Garden
