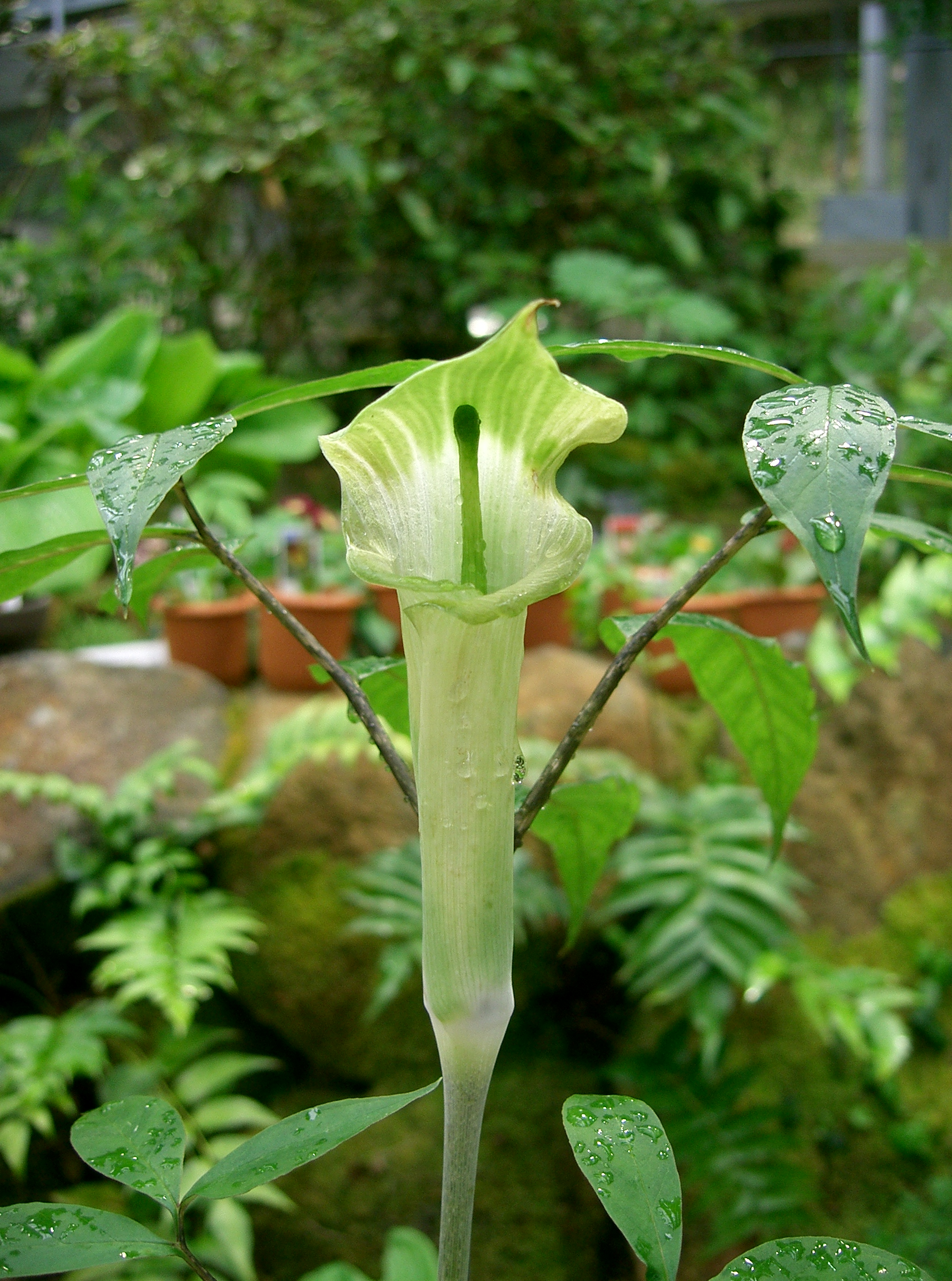

Scientific classification
- Kingdom: Plantae
- Clade: Tracheophytes
- Clade: Angiosperms
- Clade: Monocots
- Order: Alismatales
- Family: Araceae
- Genus: Arisaema
- Species: A. yamatense

Binomial name
- Arisaema yamatense Nakai

= Arisaema yamatense =

Species of flowering plant

Arisaema yamatense is a plant species in the family Araceae. It is found in Japan.
