= Arisaema utile =

Scientific classification
- Kingdom: Plantae
- Clade: Tracheophytes
- Clade: Angiosperms
- Clade: Monocots
- Order: Alismatales
- Family: Araceae
- Genus: Arisaema
- Species: A. utile

Binomial name
- Arisaema utile Hook.f. ex Schott

Species of flowering plant

Arisaema utile is a species of plant in the genus Arisaema. It is broadleaf deciduous and is widespread across the Himalayas.
