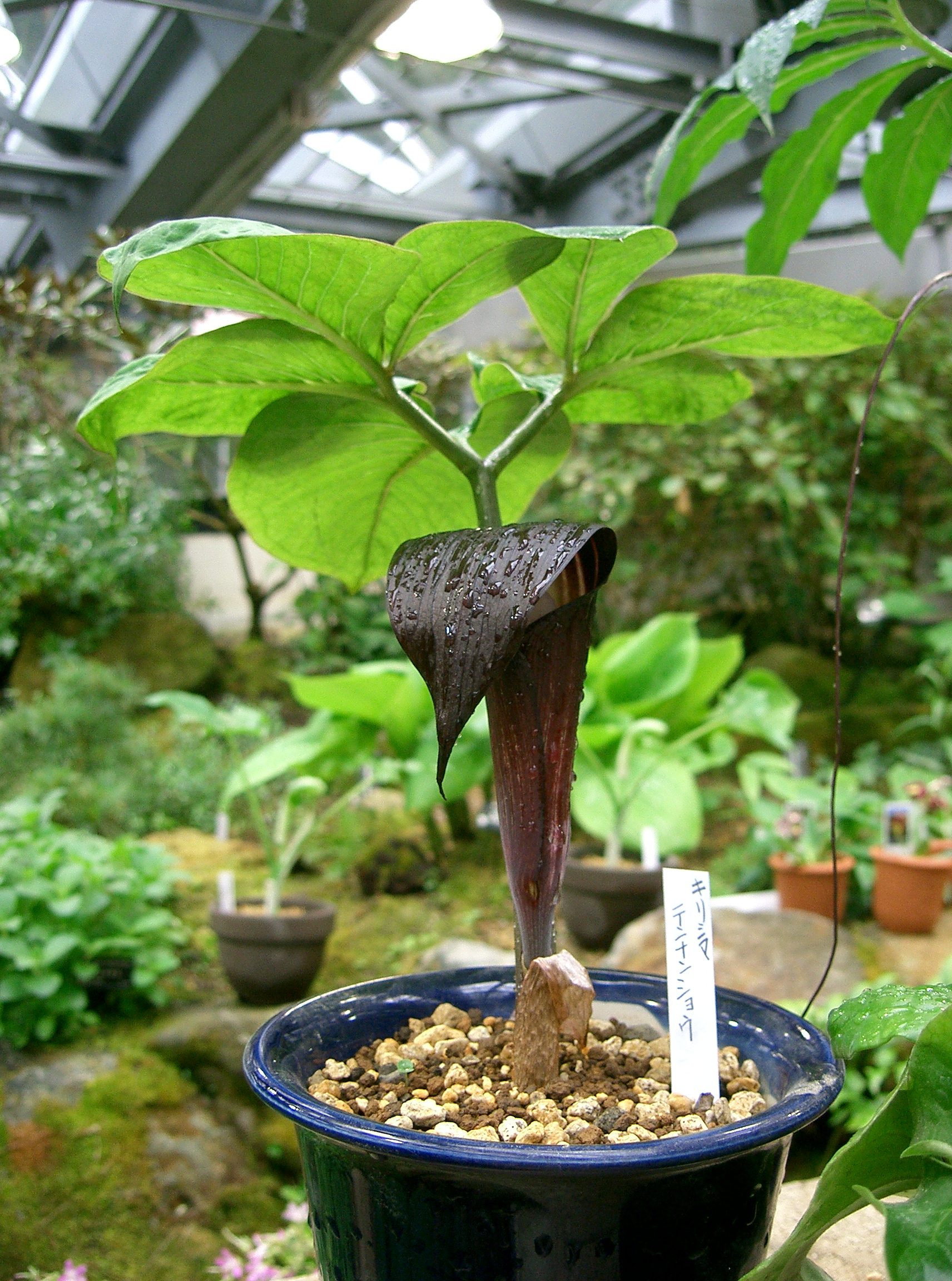

Scientific classification
- Kingdom: Plantae
- Clade: Tracheophytes
- Clade: Angiosperms
- Clade: Monocots
- Order: Alismatales
- Family: Araceae
- Genus: Arisaema
- Species: A. sazensoo

Binomial name
- Arisaema sazensoo Makino

= Arisaema sazensoo =

Species of flowering plant

Arisaema sazensoo is a plant species in the family Araceae. It is found in Japan.
