= Arisaema psittacus =

Scientific classification
- Kingdom: Plantae
- Clade: Tracheophytes
- Clade: Angiosperms
- Clade: Monocots
- Order: Alismatales
- Family: Araceae
- Genus: Arisaema
- Species: A. psittacus

Binomial name
- Arisaema psittacus E.Barnes

Species of flowering plant

Arisaema psittacus is a species of flowering plant belonging to the family Araceae.

== Description ==
Perennial, succulent, cormous herb with corms 2–6 cm in diameter and 0.7–3 cm thick, oblate or hemispherical, white within. Cataphylls three, the innermost up to 64 cm long, membranous, light green with greyish-brown mottling. Leaf solitary, petiole 50–120 cm long, green or mottled, basal part sheathing the peduncle; leaflets 7–13, radiate, elliptic-lanceolate to obovate, dark green above, glossy beneath. Peduncle 30–60 cm long, green with grey or purple streaks. Spathe 16–36 cm long, with a tubular basal portion (6–13 cm), hooded middle (6–14 cm), and tapering tail (4–9 cm), greenish with white stripes and a purplish tinge. Spadix 7–15 cm long; male portion 2–3.5 cm with scattered purplish anthers; female portion 2–5 cm with numerous pistillate flowers; appendix cylindrical, greenish-yellow, ending in a creamy-white warty head.

== Distribution ==
South India.
