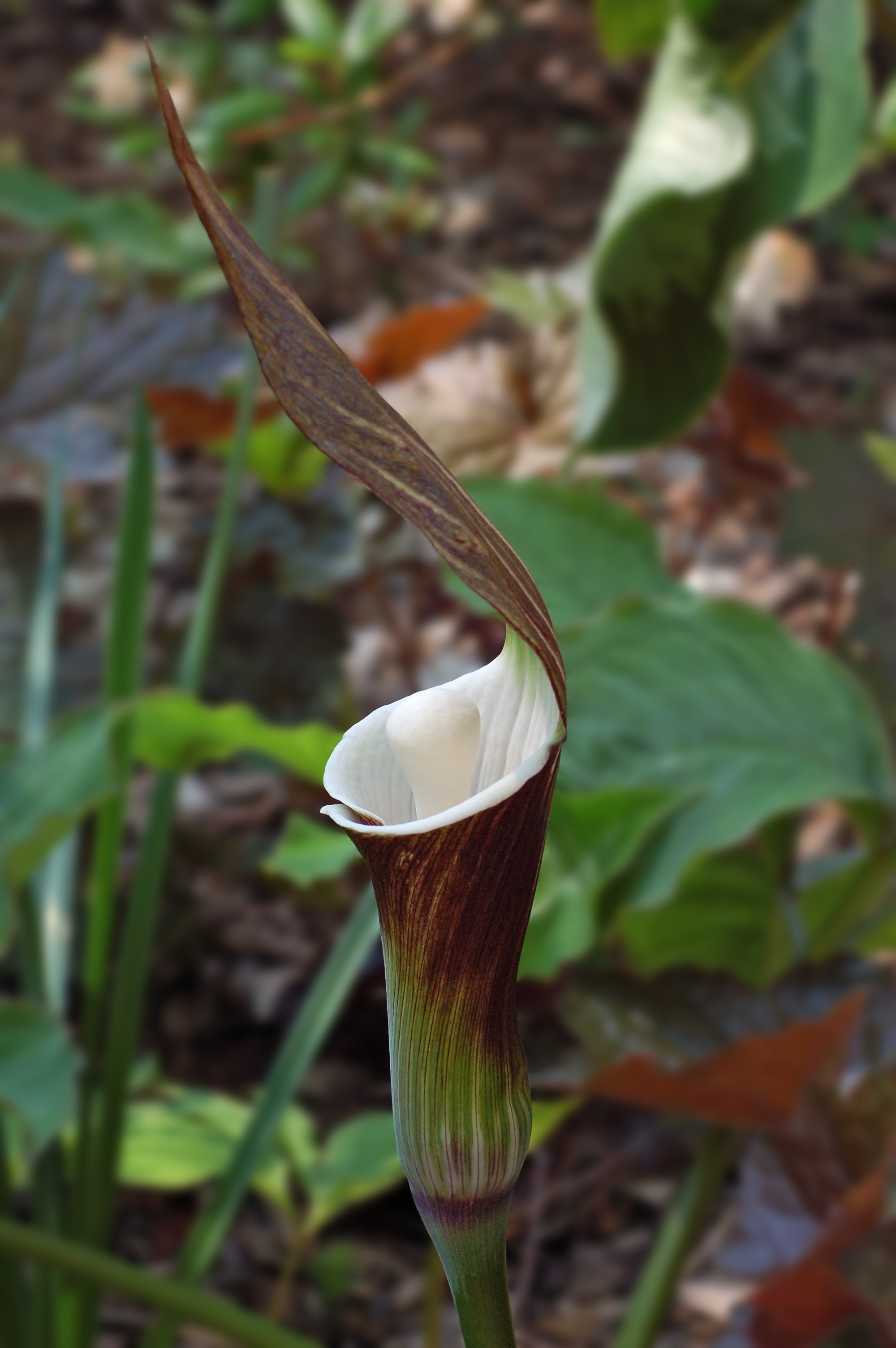

Scientific classification
- Kingdom: Plantae
- Clade: Tracheophytes
- Clade: Angiosperms
- Clade: Monocots
- Order: Alismatales
- Family: Araceae
- Genus: Arisaema
- Species: A. sikokianum

Binomial name
- Arisaema sikokianum Fr. et Sav.

Synonyms
- Arum sazensoo Bürger ex Blume; Arisaema magnificum Nakai

= Arisaema sikokianum =

Species of flowering plant

Arisaema sikokianum, the Japanese Jack-in-the-pulpit, is a herbaceous perennial plant. An unusual woodland plant noted for its unmistakable smoky-purple base, snow-white cup and large hood with purple, green and white stripes. Found only in moist, shaded areas on the Island of Shikoku in Japan, it is closely related to Arisaema triphyllum, which is common to the eastern United States. In home gardens, it is a springtime planting and is often placed with shade-loving hostas and bleeding hearts.

The plant is known to have existed and been admired in eighteenth century Japan. It may also cause contact irritation but is of little toxicologic importance.
