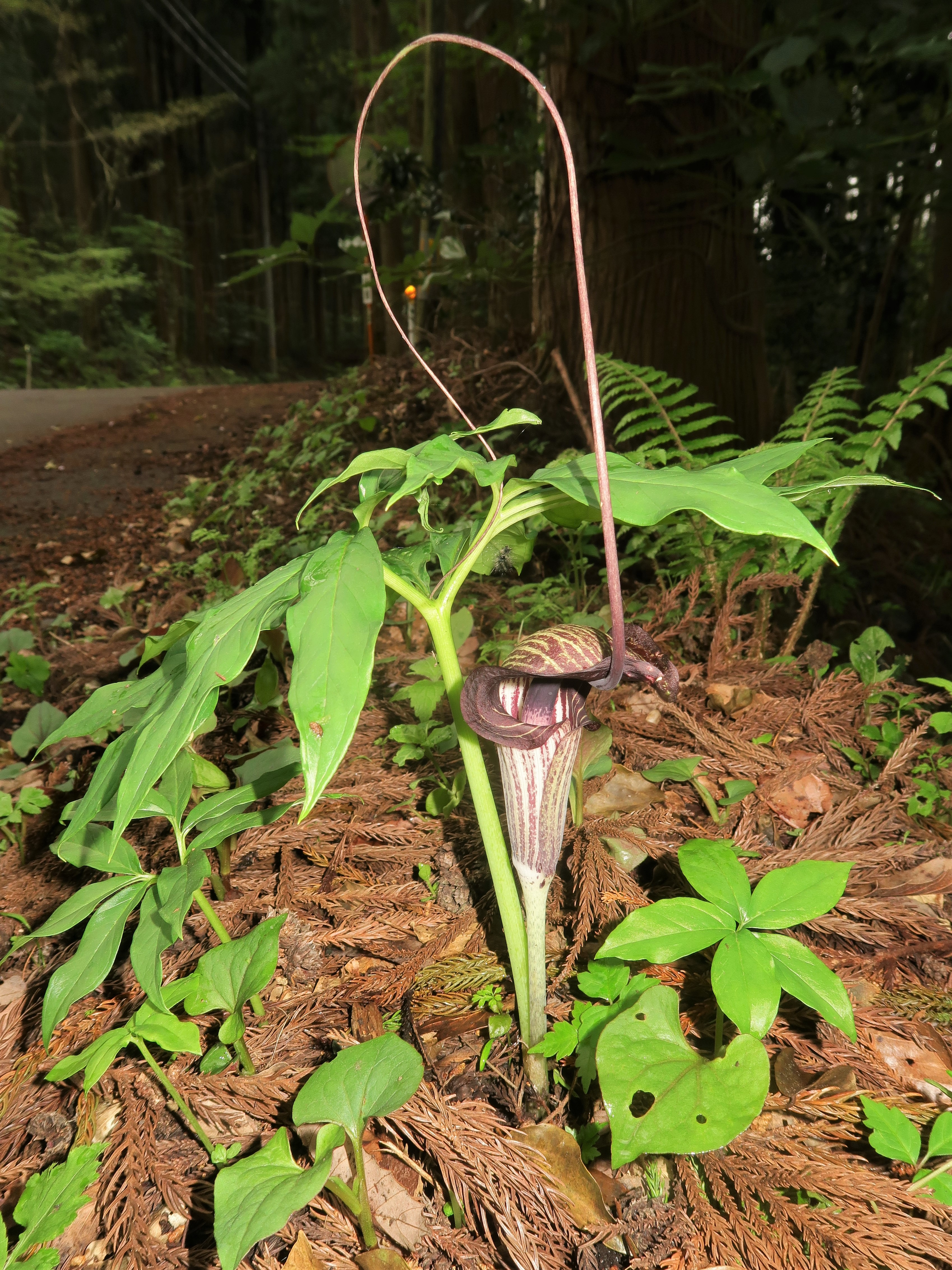
- Arisaema thunbergii subsp. urashima

Scientific classification
- Kingdom: Plantae
- Clade: Tracheophytes
- Clade: Angiosperms
- Clade: Monocots
- Order: Alismatales
- Family: Araceae
- Genus: Arisaema
- Section: Arisaema sect. Flagellarisaema (Nakai) H.Hara 1971

Type species
- Arisaema thunbergii

Species
- See text

Synonyms
- Arisaema subsect. Flagellarisaema (Nakai) J.Murata, 1984

= Arisaema sect. Flagellarisaema =

Subgenus of flowering plants

Arisaema section Flagellarisaema is a section of the genus Arisaema.

== Description ==
Plants in this section have subterranean stem with up to three or more pedate leaves. Flowers have a long spadix.

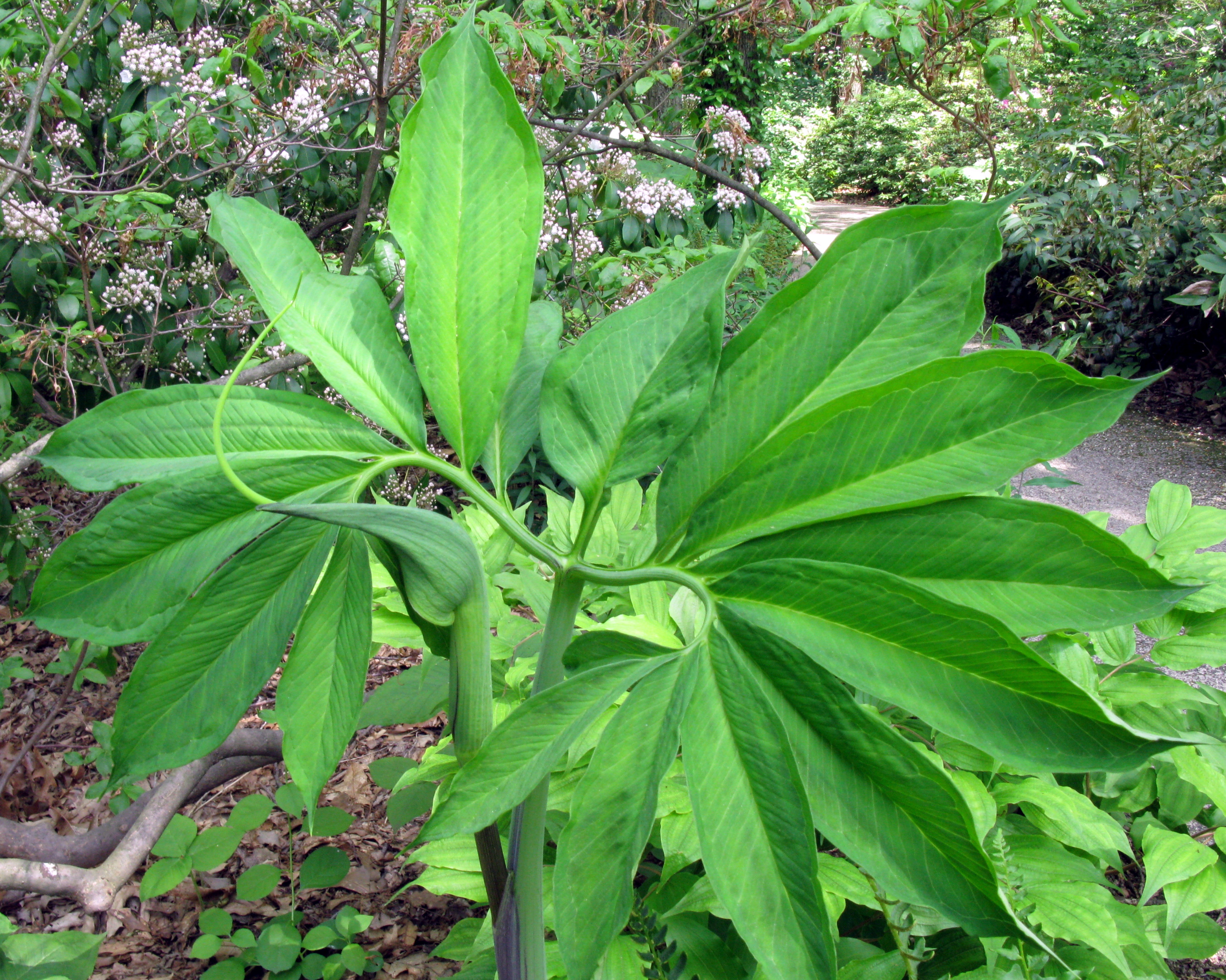
Pedated leaves of A. dracontium

== Distribution ==
Plants from this section are disjunctively distributed in eastern Asia from China through Japan and Korea, and eastern North America from Canada through Mexico.

== Species ==
Arisaema section Flagellarisaema comprises the following species:

Image	Name	Year	Distribution
	Arisaema cordatum N.E.Br.	1903	China (Guangxi, Guangdong)
	Arisaema dracontium (L.) Schott	1832	Canada(Quebec), United States (Minnesota south through Florida and Texas), Mexico (Nuevo León, Veracruz)
	Arisaema heterophyllum Blume.	1835	China, Inner Mongolia, Japan, and Korea
	Arisaema kiushianum Makino	1918	Japan (Honshu, Kyushu)
	Arisaema macrospathum Bentham	1840	Mexico
	Arisaema melanostoma Z.X.Ma, Xiao Yun Wang & Wen Yan Du	2019	China (Guangdong)
	Arisaema thunbergii Blume	1835	Japan
