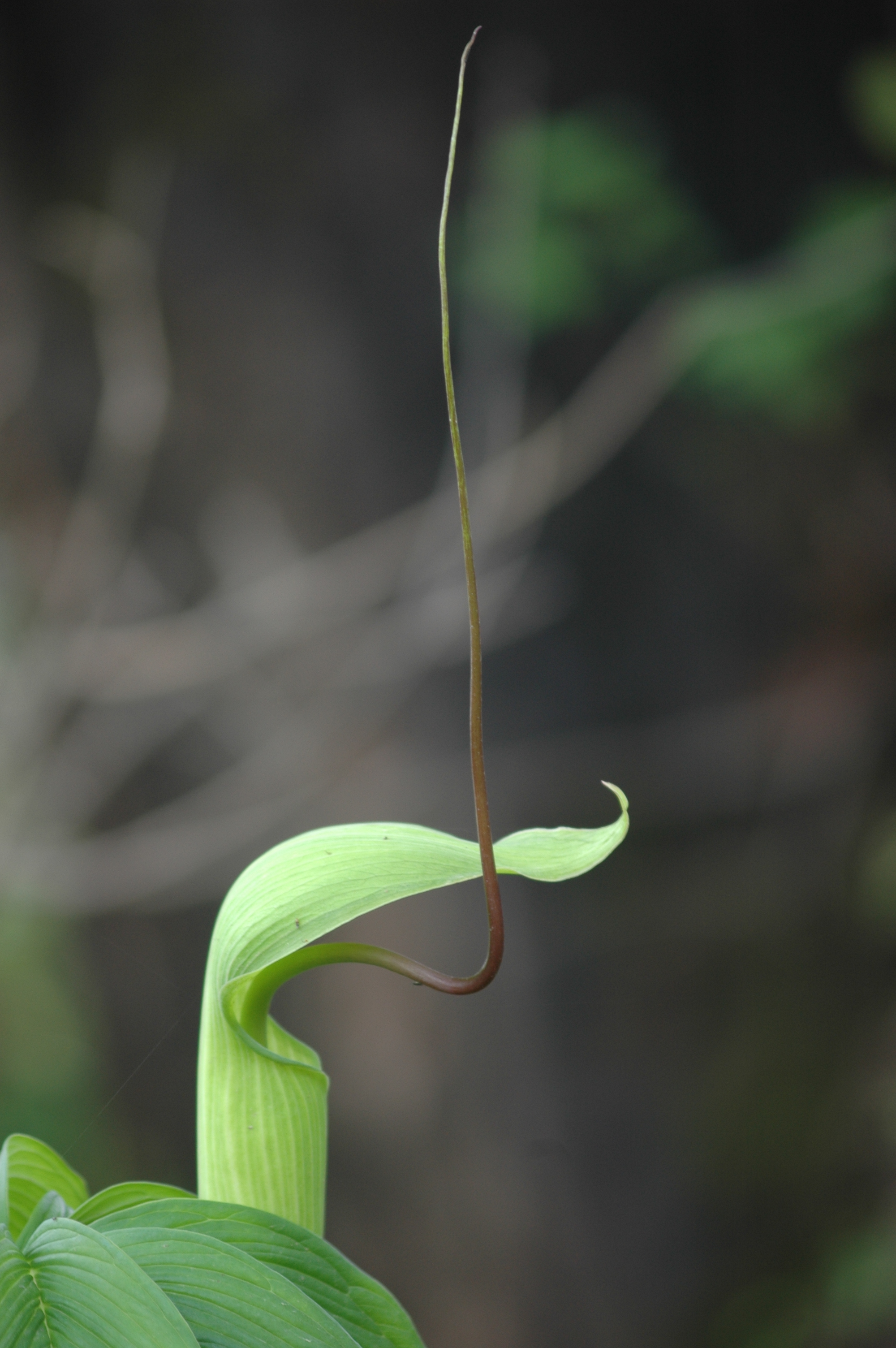
- Arisaema tortuosum

Scientific classification
- Kingdom: Plantae
- Clade: Tracheophytes
- Clade: Angiosperms
- Clade: Monocots
- Order: Alismatales
- Family: Araceae
- Genus: Arisaema
- Section: Arisaema sect. Tortuosa (Engler) H. Hara 1971

Type species
- Arisaema tortuosum

Species
- See text

= Arisaema sect. Tortuosa =

Subgenus of flowering plants

Arisaema section Tortuosa is a section of the genus Arisaema.

== Description ==
Plants in this section have underground tubers and 3-7 foliolate leaves.

== Distribution ==
Plants from this section are found from China, Nepal, Bhutan, Myanmar to India and Sri Lanka, and North America.

== Species ==
Arisaema section Tortuosa comprises the following species:

Image	Name	Year	Distribution
	Arisaema ghaticum (Sardesai, S.P.Gaikwad & S.R.Yadav) Punekar & Kumaran	2009	India( Maharashtra)
	Arisaema jethompsonii Thiyagaraj & P.Daniel	1999	India (Tamil Nadu)
	Arisaema macrospathum Benth.	1840	Mexico
	Arisaema muricaudatum Sivad.	1985	India (Kerala)
	Arisaema murrayi (J.Graham) Hook.	1848	India
	Arisaema tortuosum (Wallich) Schott in Schott & Endlicher	1832	India (Assam), China (Sichuan, Xizang, Yunnan), Bhutan, Myanmar, Nepal, Pakistan, Sri Lanka
