= Urashima =

Urashima may refer to:

- Urashima Tarō, a hero from a Japanese fairy tale
- Arisaema thunbergii subsp. urashima, a plant widespread in Japan
