= Arisaema sect. Franchetiana =

- Arisaema fargesii

Scientific classification
- Kingdom: Plantae
- Clade: Tracheophytes
- Clade: Angiosperms
- Clade: Monocots
- Order: Alismatales
- Family: Araceae
- Genus: Arisaema
- Section: Arisaema sect. Franchetiana (Engl.) H. Hara 1971

Type species
- Arisaema franchetianum

Species
- See text

Subgenus of flowering plants

Arisaema section Franchetiana is a section of the genus Arisaema.

== Description ==
Plants in this section have purple globose tubers with one to two 3-foliolate leaves.

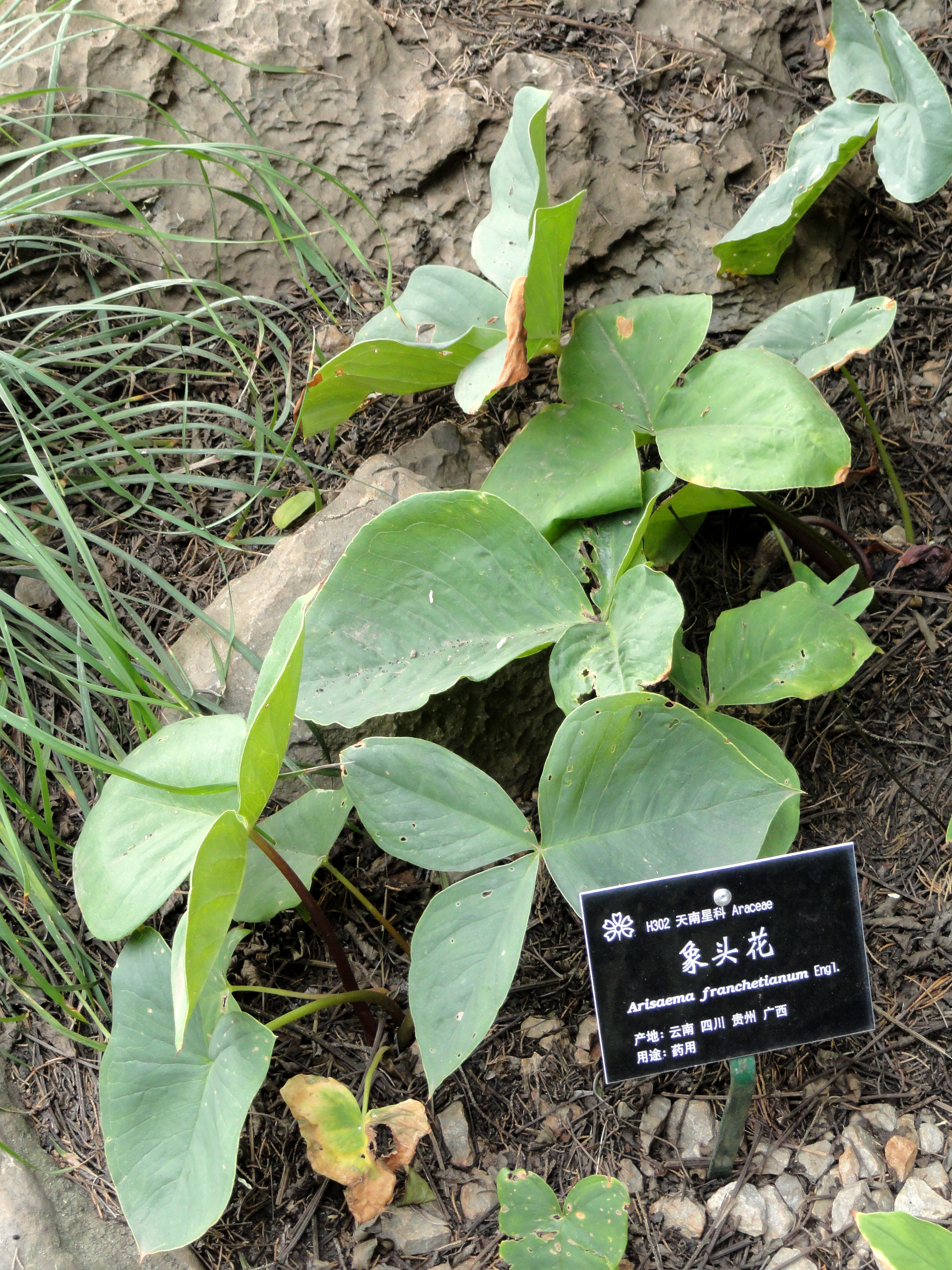
3-foliolate leaves of A.franchetianum

== Distribution ==
Plants from this section are found in China and Myanmar.

== Species ==
Arisaema section Franchetiana comprises the following species:

Image	Name	Year	Distribution
	Arisaema bogneri P.C.Boyce & H.Li	1999	China (Xizang, Yunnan)
	Arisaema candidissimum W. W. Smith	1917	China (Sichuan, Xizang, Yunnan)
	Arisaema fargesii Buchet	1911	China(Gansu, Hubei, Hunan, Sichuan, Xizang, Yunnan)
	Arisaema franchetianum Engler	1881	China (Guangxi, Guizhou, Hunan, Sichuan, Yunnan), Myanmar
	Arisaema lichiangense W. W. Smith	1914	China (Sichuan, Yunnan)
	Arisaema sinii K. Krause	1930	China (Guangxi, Guizhou, Hunan, Sichuan, Yunnan)
