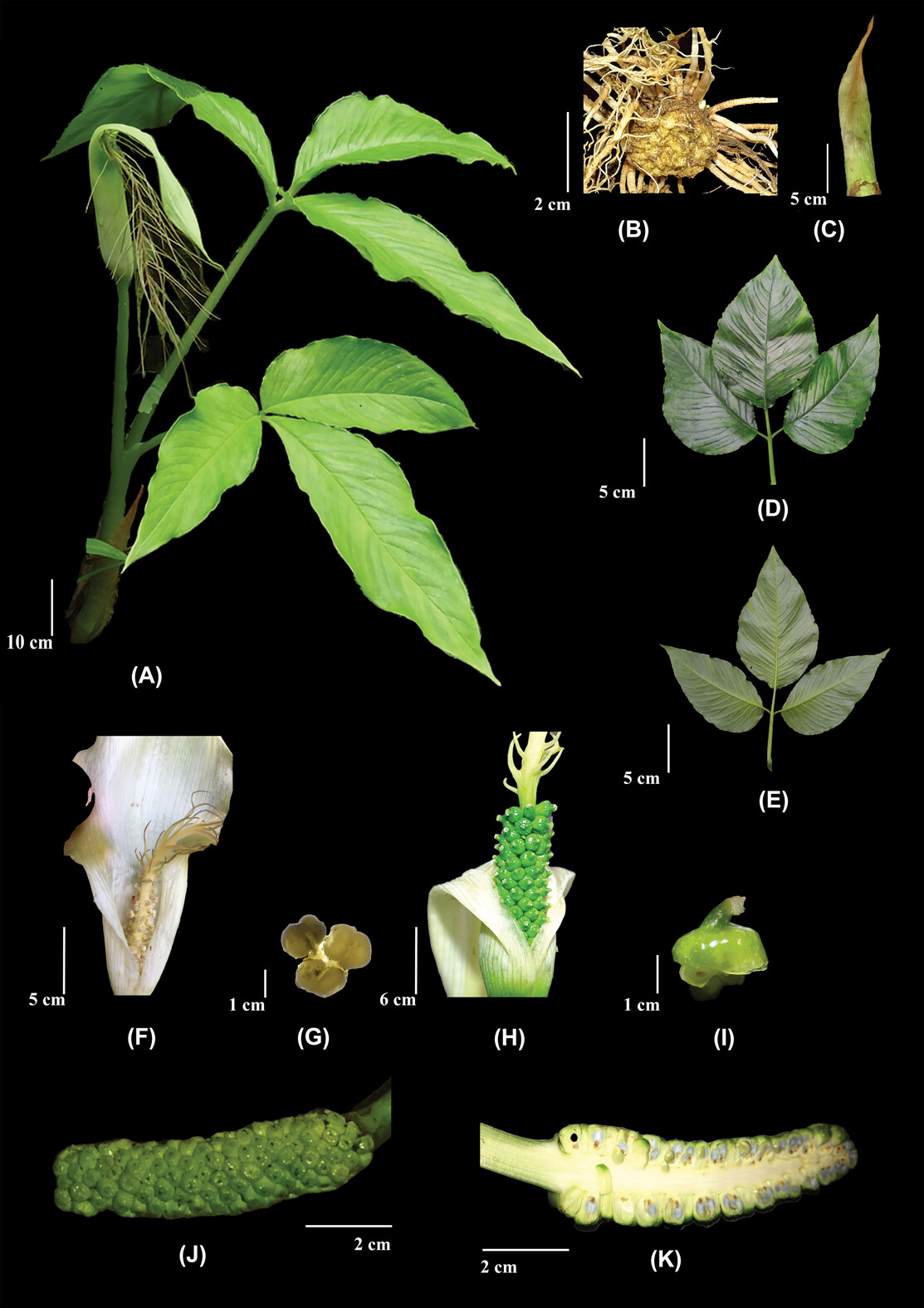

Scientific classification
- Kingdom: Plantae
- Clade: Embryophytes
- Clade: Tracheophytes
- Clade: Angiosperms
- Clade: Monocots
- Order: Alismatales
- Family: Araceae
- Genus: Arisaema
- Species: A. siahaense

Binomial name
- Arisaema siahaense R.Sengupta & S.S.Dash

= Arisaema siahaense =

Species of flowering plant

Arisaema siahaense is a species of flowering plant in the family Araceae. It is endemic to northeastern India and was discovered in the state of Mizoram. The species was formally identified and named in 2026 based on distinctive morphological characteristics.

== Description ==
Arisaema siahaense belongs to the genus Arisaema, commonly known as cobra lilies or jack-in-the-pulpit plants. It is characterized by its unique spathe coloration and tuber structure, which distinguish it from closely related species in the region. The plant typically grows in subtropical forest habitats at moderate elevations.

The species epithet siahaense refers to the Siaha district of southern Mizoram, where the type specimen was collected.
