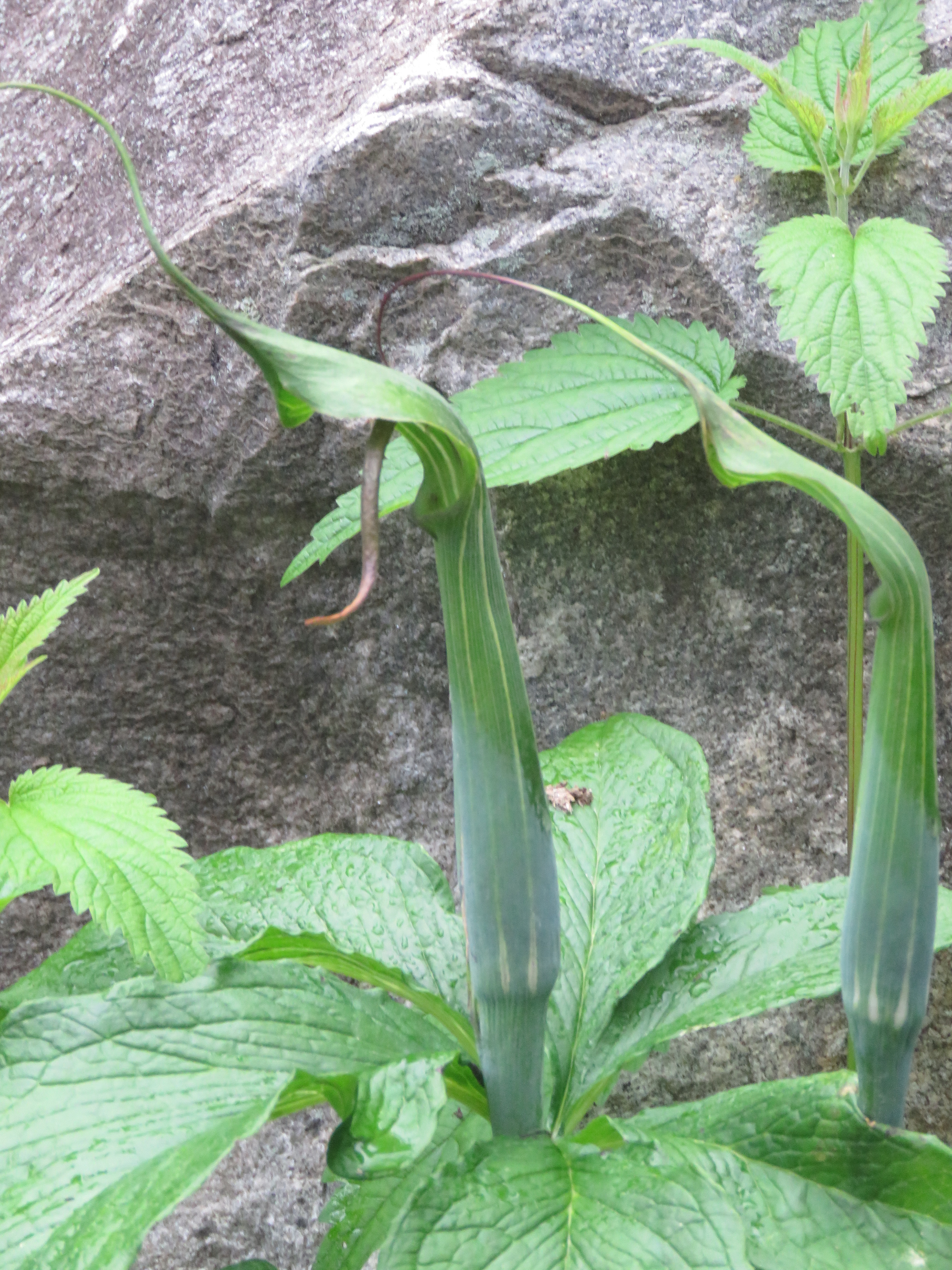
- Arisaema jacquemontii

Scientific classification
- Kingdom: Plantae
- Clade: Tracheophytes
- Clade: Angiosperms
- Clade: Monocots
- Order: Alismatales
- Family: Araceae
- Genus: Arisaema
- Section: Arisaema sect. Tenuipistillata; Engl. 1920

Type species
- Arisaema jacquemontii

Species
- See text

= Arisaema sect. Tenuipistillata =

Subgenus of flowering plants

Arisaema section Tenuipistillata is a section of the genus Arisaema.

== Description ==
Plants in this section are deciduous with subglobose tubers, with 1–2 pedate or palmate leaves.

== Distribution ==
Plants from this section are found from China through the Himalayas to Afghanistan, Pakistan, and Bangladesh.

== Species ==
Arisaema section Tenuipistillata comprises the following species:

Image	Name	Year	Distribution
	Arisaema jacquemontii Blume	1835	China (Xizang), Afghanistan, Bangladesh, Bhutan, India (Kashmir), Nepal, Pakistan
	Arisaema souliei Buchet	1911	China (Sichuan)
	Arisaema wardii C. Marquand & Airy Shaw	1929	China (Qinghai, Shanxi, Xizang, Yunnan)
