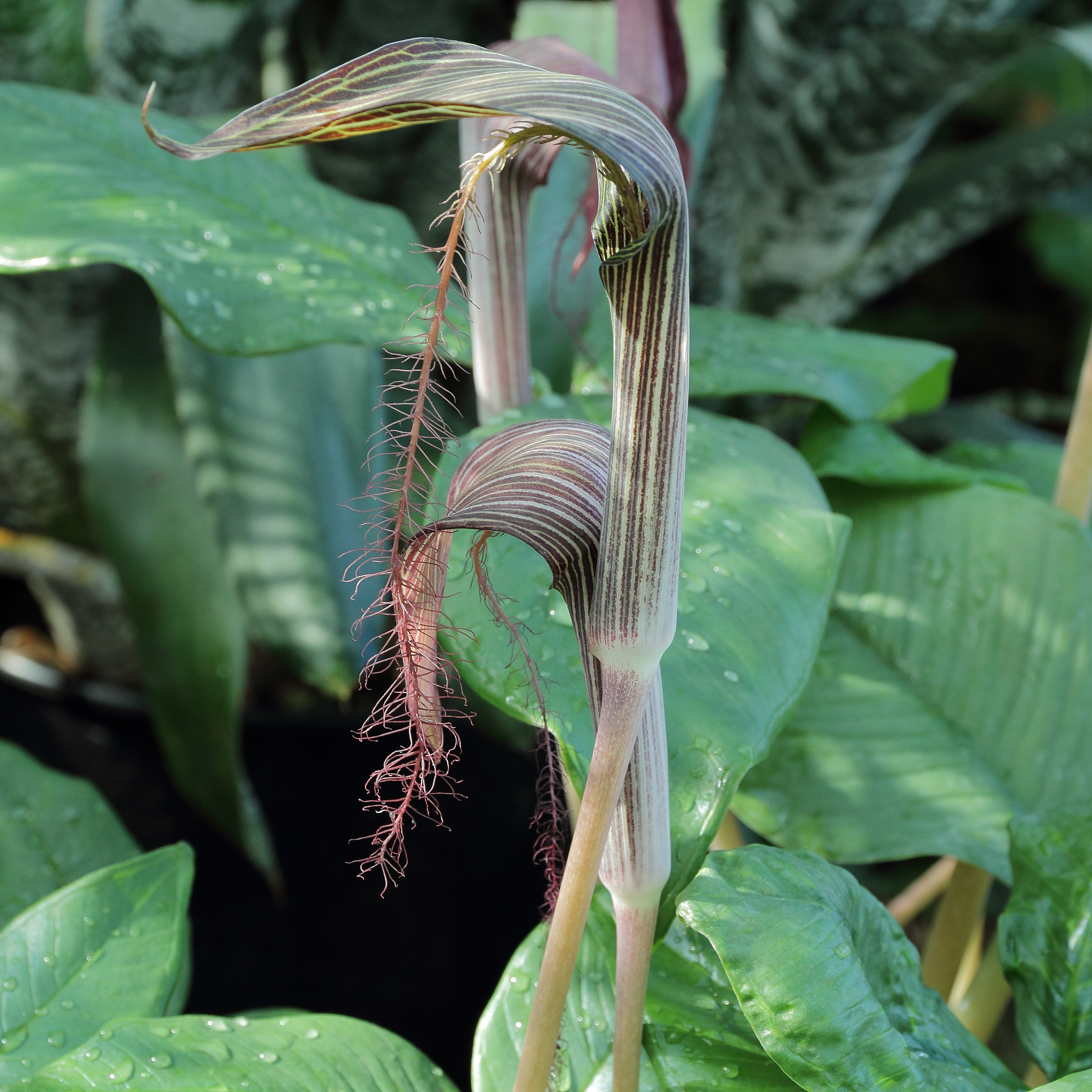

Scientific classification
- Kingdom: Plantae
- Clade: Tracheophytes
- Clade: Angiosperms
- Clade: Monocots
- Order: Alismatales
- Family: Araceae
- Genus: Arisaema
- Species: A. fimbriatum

Binomial name
- Arisaema fimbriatum Mast.

= Arisaema fimbriatum =

Species of plant

Arisaema fimbriatum is a species of flowering plant in the family Araceae. It is native to Thailand, Peninsular Malaysia, and Pulau Lankawi

== Taxonomy ==
A. fimbriatum is the type species for Arisaema section Fimbriata (Engl.) H.Li a section with subglobose tubers and trifoliate leaves, bisexual spadix and a long spadix appendage that extends from the spathe. Plants in this section are from subtropical Asia. This section was first described in 1979, comprising six species. It was later synonymised under section Attenuata by Murata in 2011. In 2016 Ohi-Toma et al. resurrected the section as monotypic with A. fimbriatum following a phylogenetic analysis of the genus.
