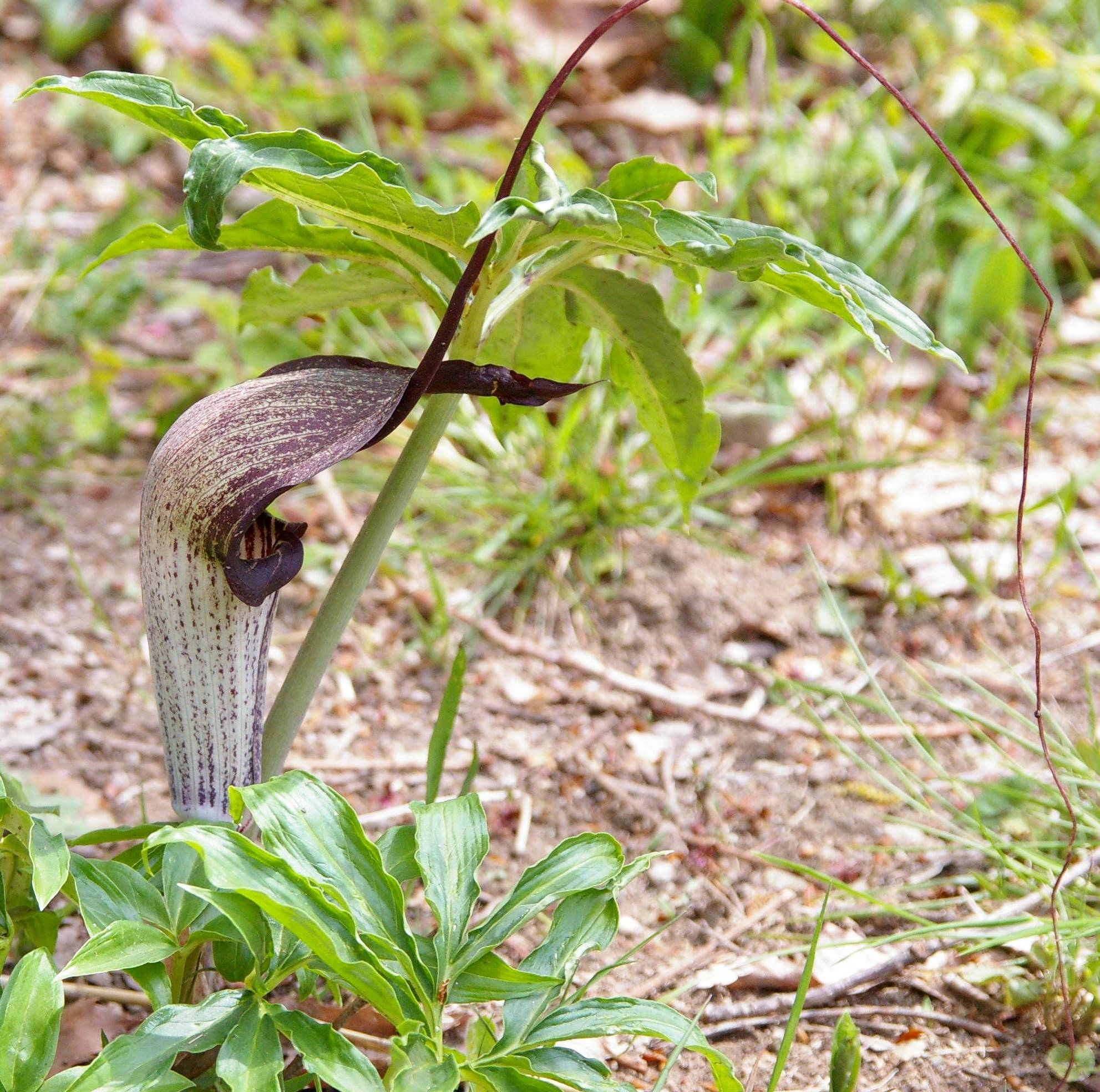

Scientific classification
- Kingdom: Plantae
- Clade: Tracheophytes
- Clade: Angiosperms
- Clade: Monocots
- Order: Alismatales
- Family: Araceae
- Genus: Arisaema
- Species: A. thunbergii
- Subspecies: A. t. subsp. urashima

Trinomial name
- Arisaema thunbergii subsp. urashima (H. Hara) H. Ohashi & J. Murata

= Arisaema thunbergii subsp. urashima =

Subspecies of flowering plant

Arisaema thunbergii subsp. urashima is a herbaceous perennial plant. It is widespread through the woodlands of Japan, especially near the coast. The plant has a very curious inflorescence, and is popular in horticulture. As with all arisaemas, the inflorescence consists of a spathe tube enclosing a spadix appendix. In the case of A. thunbergi subsp. urashima, the spadix appendix is elongated into a free hanging thread of 45 to 60 cm. The underground tuber often produces offsets, which can be removed and grown on. The foliage dies down by summer, leaving the fruiting spike to ripen in autumn. The red berries contain high amounts of oxalic acid, and can cause painful irritation to the skin. All parts of the plant should be considered poisonous.
