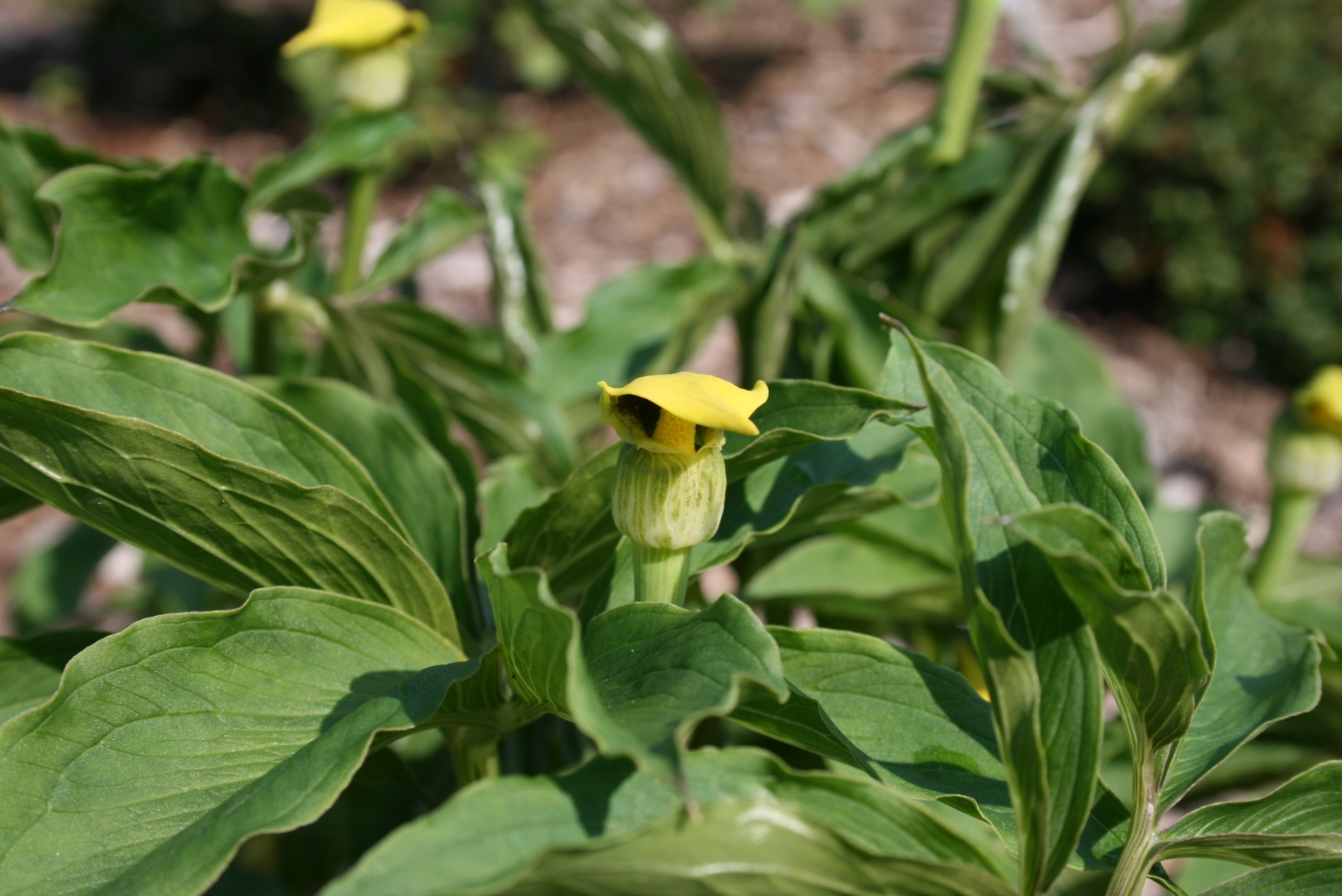

Scientific classification
- Kingdom: Plantae
- Clade: Tracheophytes
- Clade: Angiosperms
- Clade: Monocots
- Order: Alismatales
- Family: Araceae
- Genus: Arisaema
- Species: A. flavum

Binomial name
- Arisaema flavum (Forssk.) Schott

Synonyms
- Arum flavum Forssk.; Dochafa flava (Forssk.) Schott; Arisaema abbreviatum Schott; Arisaema pertusum Riedl; Arisaema flavum subsp. abbreviatum (Schott) J.Murata; Arisaema flavum var. tibeticum (J.Murata) Gusman & L.Gusman; Arisaema daochengense P.C.Kao

= Arisaema flavum =

Species of flowering plant

Arisaema flavum is a species of flowering plant widespread across north-eastern Africa and southern Asia. It is native to Ethiopia, Somalia, the Arabian Peninsula, Pakistan, Afghanistan, Nepal, Assam, Himalayas, Tibet, Yunnan, and Sichuan. The species epithet flavum is Latin for yellow and indicates its flower colour.

== Description ==
The plant is 0.4 metres (1 ft 4 in) with its tuber being subglobose and 1.5–2.5 centimetres (0.59–0.98 in) wide. Its petiole is either green or purplish in colour, is unmarked, and is 11–35 centimetres (4.3–13.8 in) long. The species' spathe is only 2.5–6 centimetres (0.98–2.36 in) while the spate tube is yellowish green, is ovoid, and is 1–1.5 centimetres (0.39–0.59 in) long by 1–1.4 centimetres (0.39–0.55 in) wide. The throat is dark purple and have oblong-ovate limb, which is also either yellow or green coloured. The limb is also accumulate, inside of which its dark purple in colour and is slightly incurved. The size of a limb is 1.5–4.5 centimetres (0.59–1.77 in) by 0.8–2 centimetres (0.31–0.79 in). It is bisexual and have an 1–2 centimetres (0.39–0.79 in) long spadix. Female basal part have ovaries and is greenish in colour. The male basal part is slightly different; it is lightly yellow coloured and is 3–7 centimetres (1.2–2.8 in) long by 2–3 millimetres (0.079–0.118 in) thick. The species' appendix is very short and is yellowish-green in colour. Flowers have 2 anthers which are 2-loculed. The flowers blooming from June to July which are being pollinated by flies. It berries are obovate the 3 seeds of which are pale yellow in colour and are 2–2.5 millimetres (0.079–0.098 in) long.

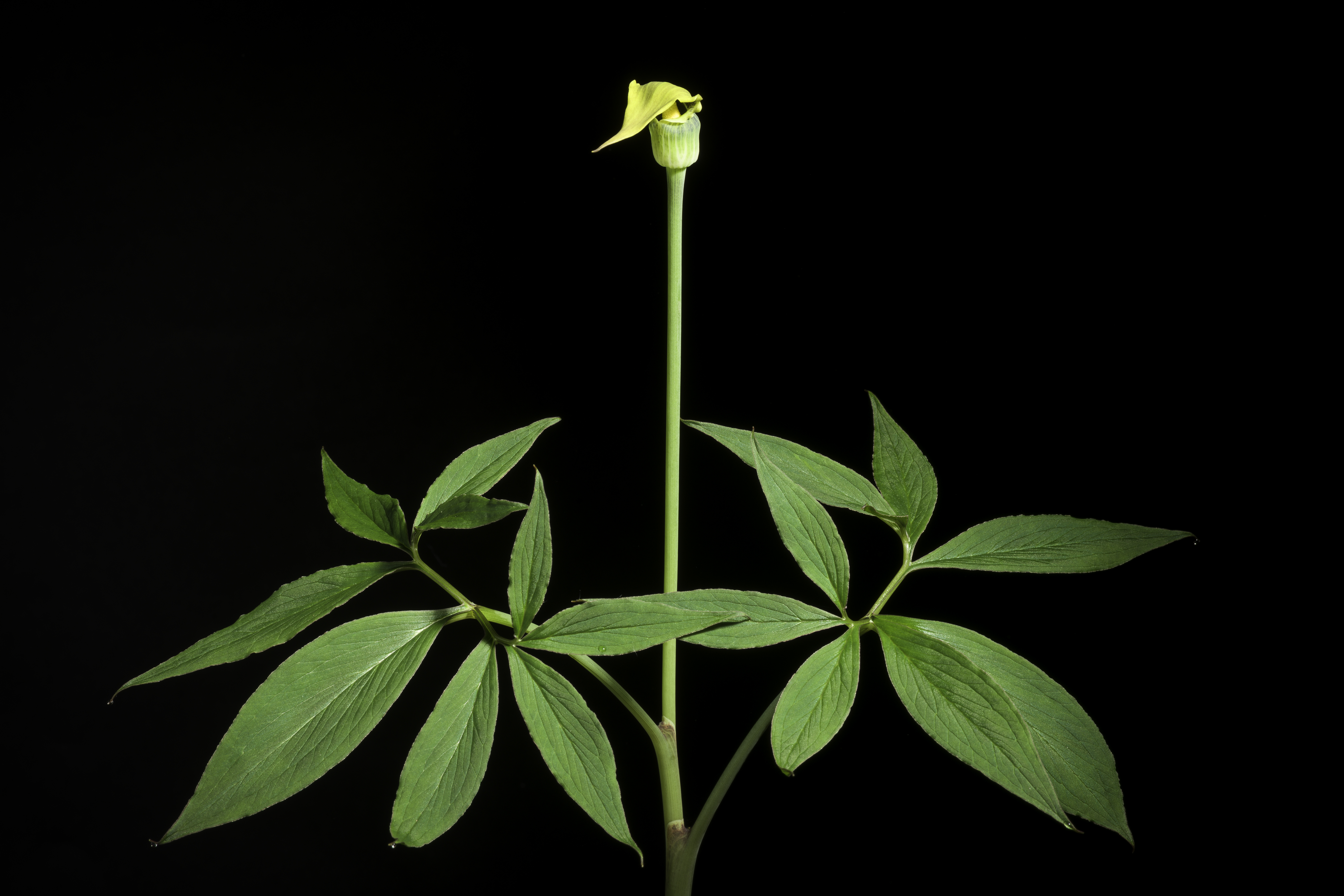
Plant

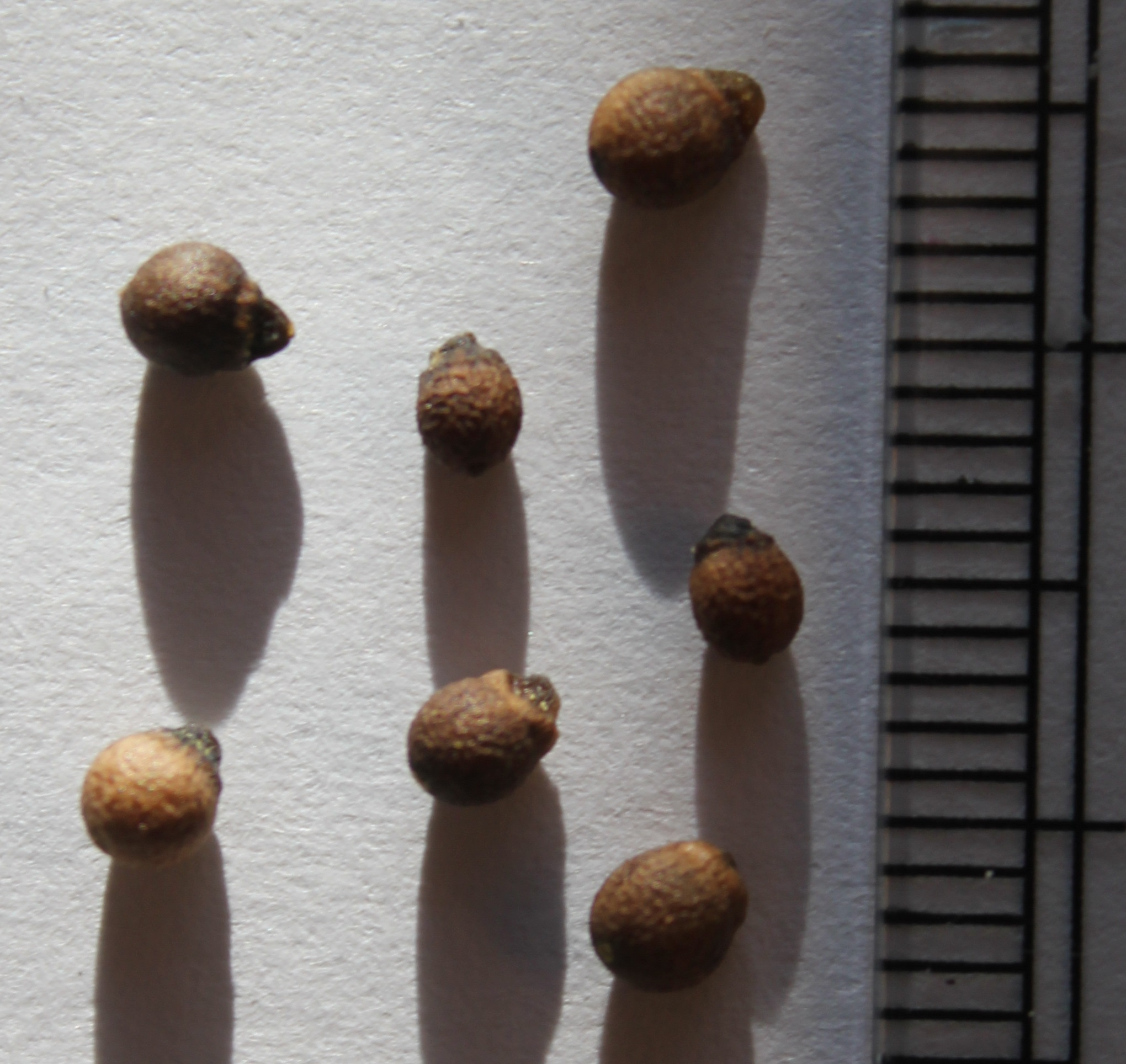
seeds

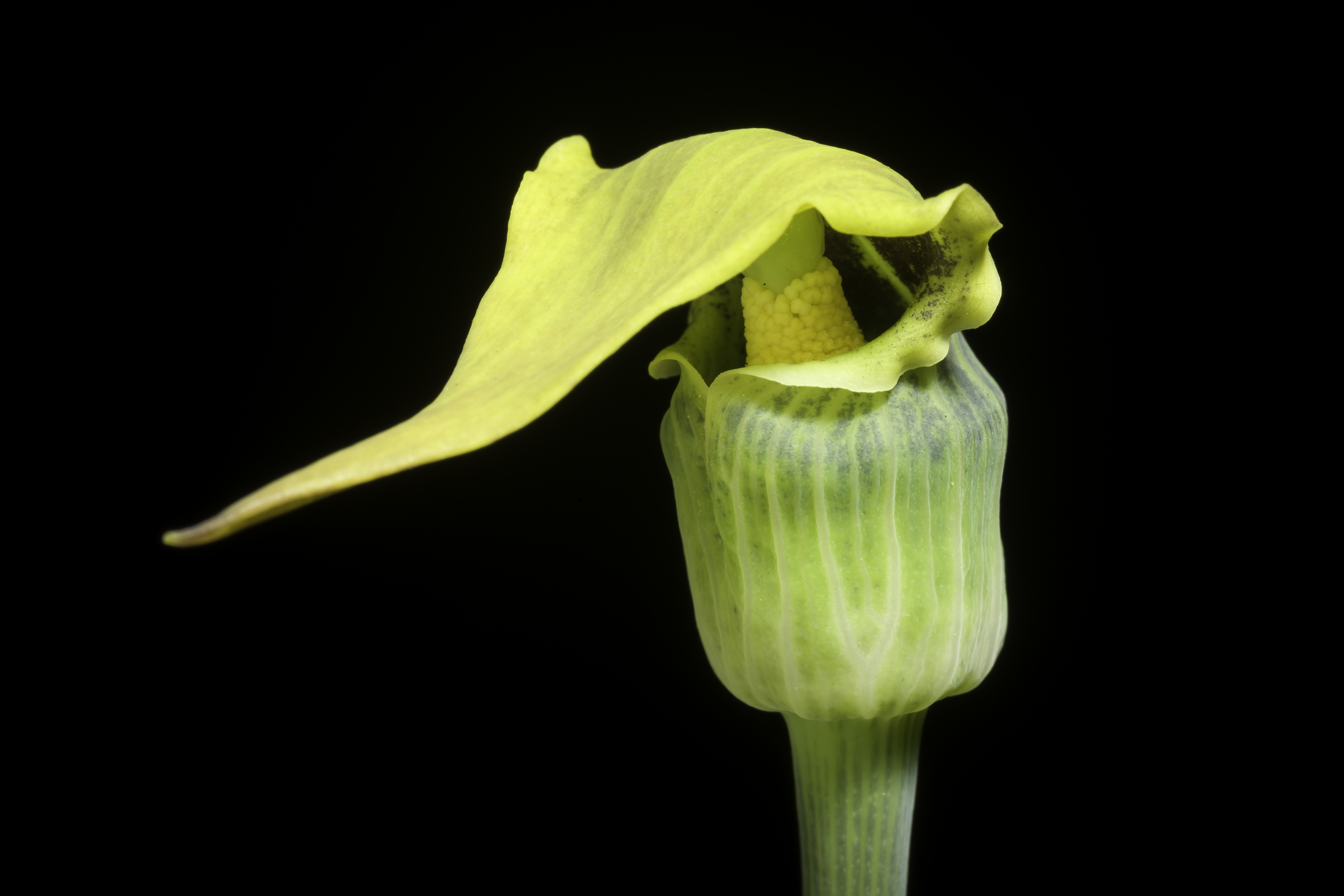
Flower

== Taxonomy ==
Arisaema flavum is a monotypic member of Arisaema sect. Dochafa (Schott) H. Hara 1971. The section is distinguished by subglobose tubers, 1-2 leaves with a pedate leaf blade, a small spathe, and nodding inflorescence.

== Uses ==
It is a famine food, eaten during periods of crop failure or famine in the Konso special woreda, where it is endemic. It is preferred to other species of Arisaema due to its relatively acceptable taste, can be prepared within a short time, and is less perishable. But all varieties must be crushed and dried prior to further preparation. The dried parts are then ground to powder, which is mixed with water and cooked like maize for approximately 30 minutes.
