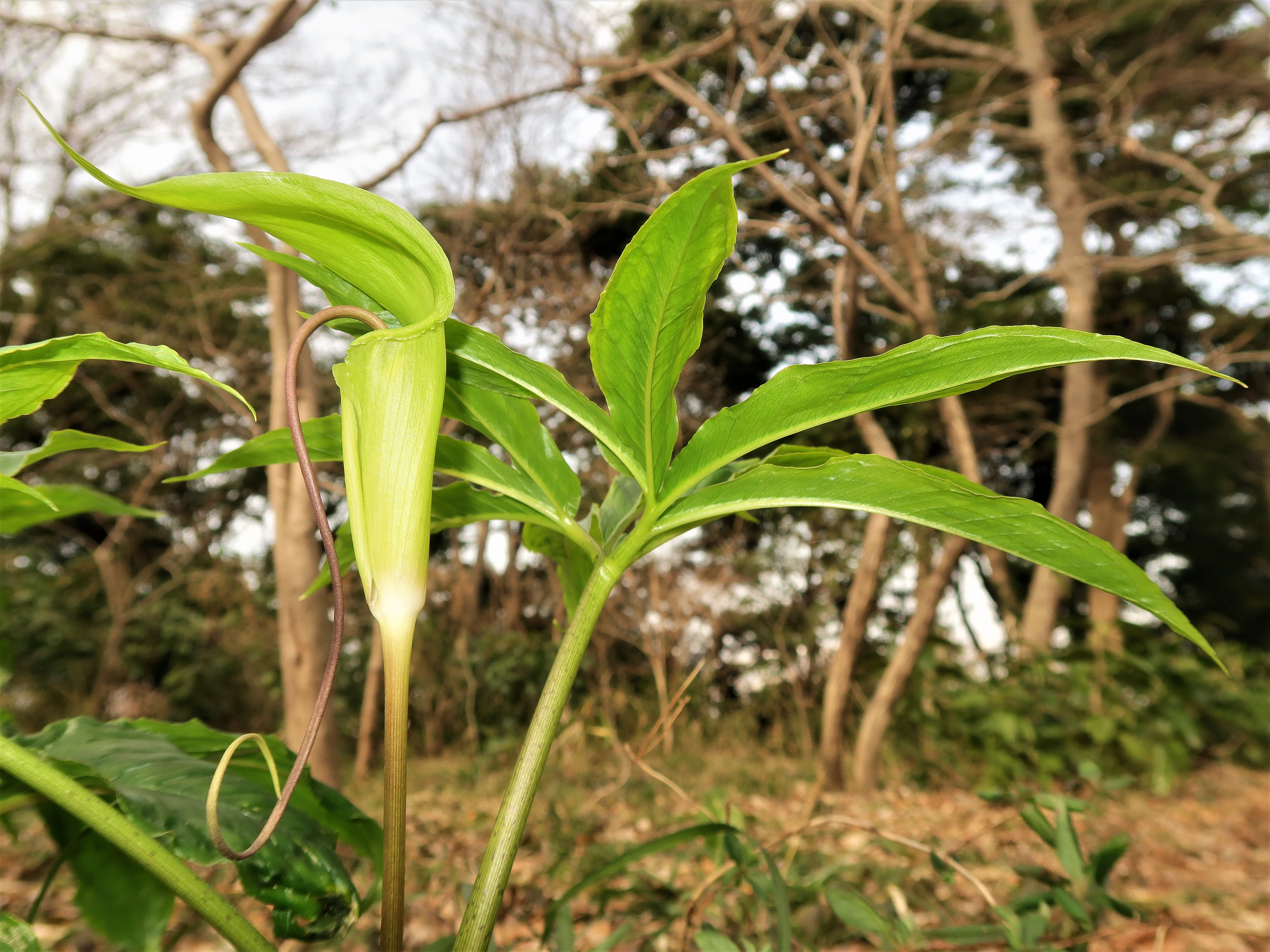
- Arisaema negishii

Scientific classification
- Kingdom: Plantae
- Clade: Tracheophytes
- Clade: Angiosperms
- Clade: Monocots
- Order: Alismatales
- Family: Araceae
- Genus: Arisaema
- Section: Arisaema sect. Clavata (Engler) H. Hara 1971

Type species
- Arisaema clavatum

Species
- See text

= Arisaema sect. Clavata =

Subgenus of flowering plants

Arisaema section Clavata is a section of the genus Arisaema.

== Description ==
Plants in this section have tuberous underground stems with white interior and pedate leaves. Plant has auxiliary buds with accessory buds and sterile flowers on spadix appendages.

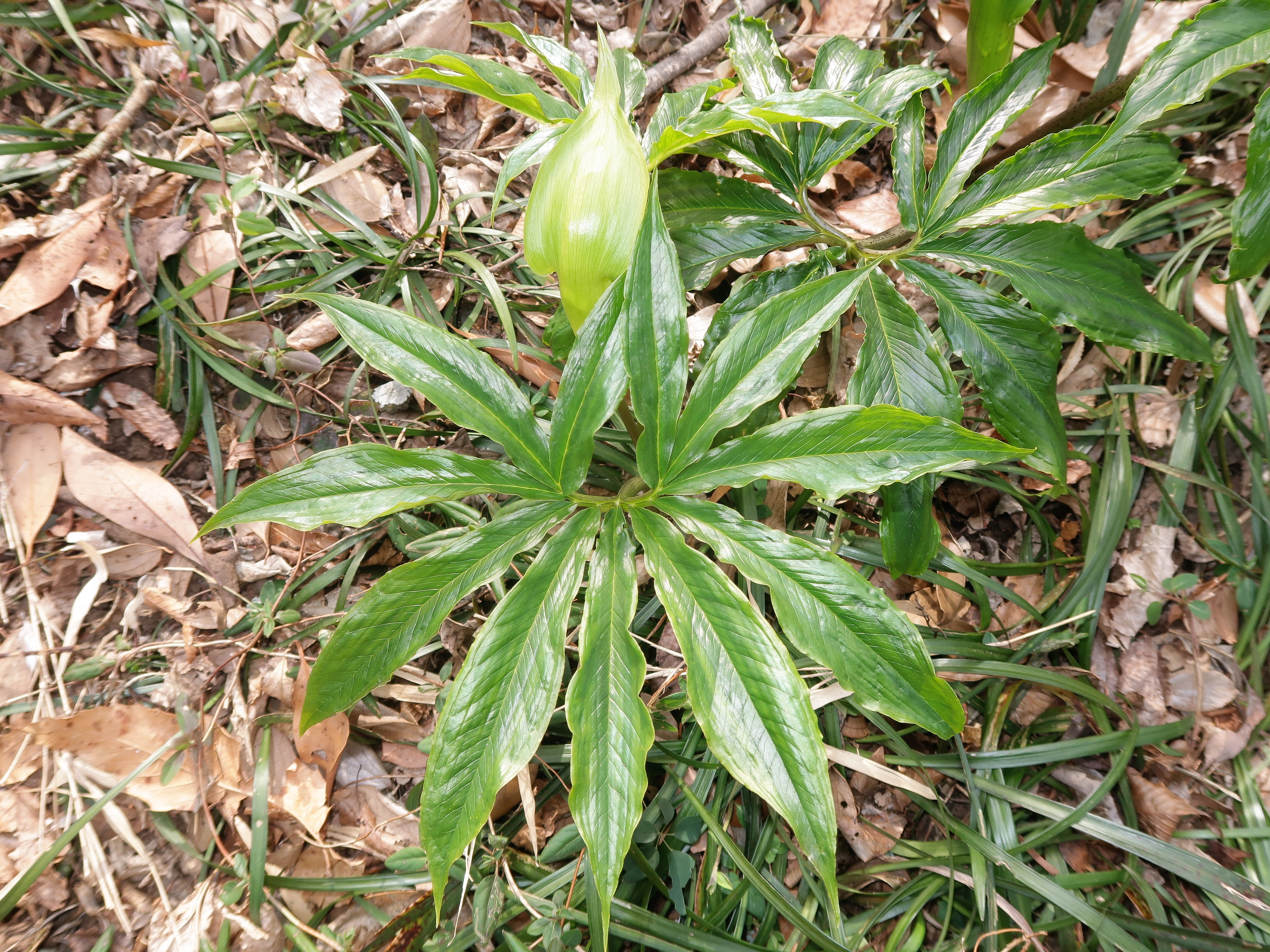
Pedate leaves of A. negishii

== Distribution ==
Plants from this section are found from central China to japan.

== Species ==
Arisaema section Clavata comprises the following species:

Image	Name	Year	Distribution
	Arisaema clavatum Buchet	1911	China(Guizhou, Hubei, Sichuan.)
	Arisaema hunanense Handel-Mazzetti	1936	China (Guangdong, Hubei, Hunan, E Sichuan.)
	Arisaema heterocephalum Koidz.	1928	Ryukyu Islands
	Arisaema ilanense J. C. Wang	1996	Taiwan
	Arisaema negishii Makino	1918	S. Korea, Japan (Hachijo, Miyake Islands)
	Arisaema silvestrii Pampanini	1915	China (Anhui, Fujian, Guangdong, Guizhou, Henan, Hubei, Hunan, Jiangsu, Jiangxi, Shanxi, Zhejiang)
