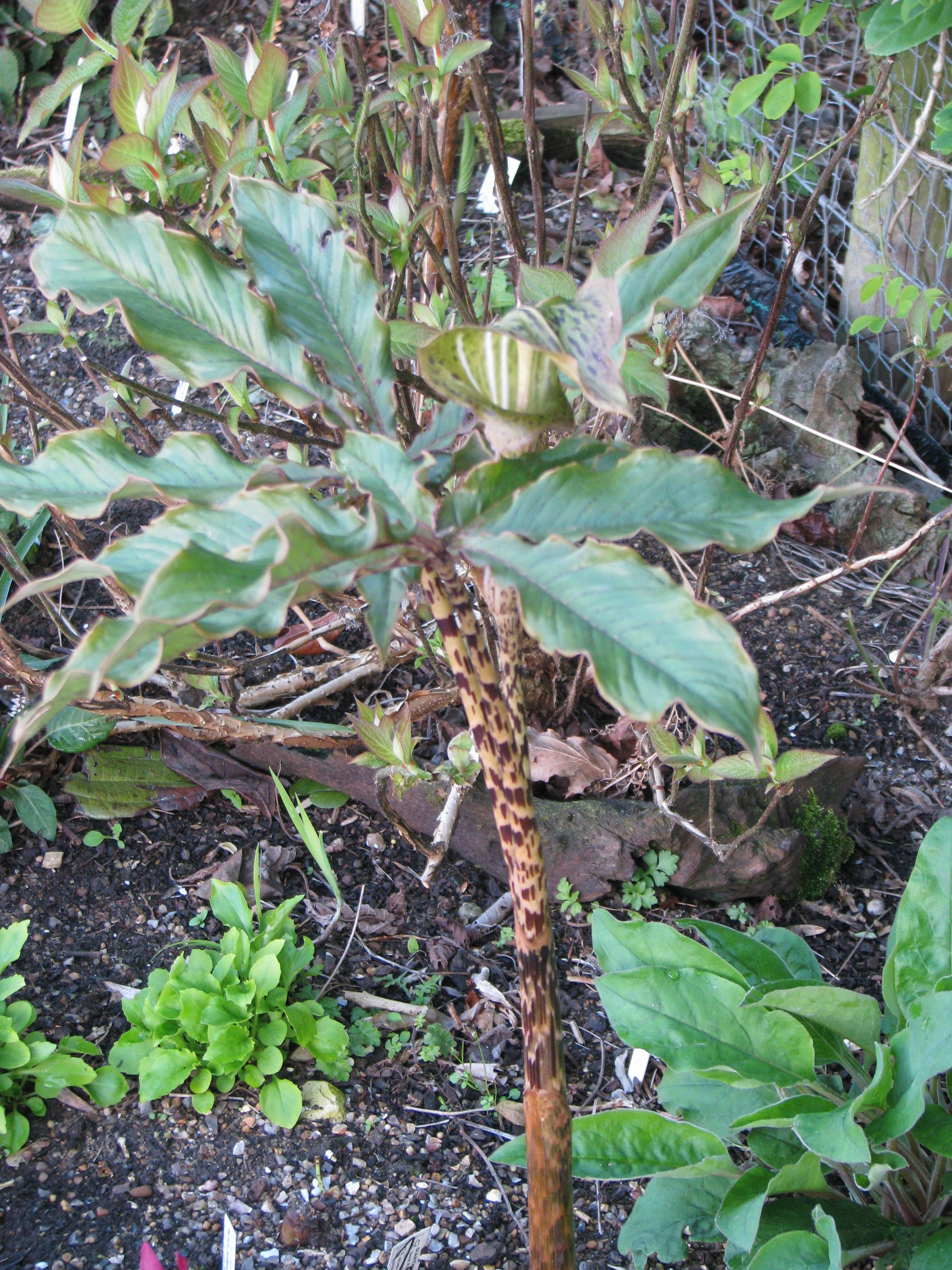
- Arisaema nepenthoides

Scientific classification
- Kingdom: Plantae
- Clade: Tracheophytes
- Clade: Angiosperms
- Clade: Monocots
- Order: Alismatales
- Family: Araceae
- Genus: Arisaema
- Section: Arisaema sect. Nepenthoidea (Engl.) H. Hara 1971

Type species
- Arisaema nepenthoides

Species
- See text

= Arisaema sect. Nepenthoidea =

Subgenus of flowering plants

Arisaema section Nepenthoidea is a section of the genus Arisaema.

== Description ==
Plants in this section have tuberous underground stems, trifoliolate or pedate leaves. Brownish, olive-green spathe that opens earlier than leaves.

== Distribution ==
Plants from this section are found from Southwest China, India, Nepal, Bhutan, and Myanmar.

== Species ==
Arisaema section Nepenthoidea comprises the following species:

Image	Name	Year	Distribution
	Arisaema auriculatum Buchet	1911	China (Hunan, Sichuan, Yunnan)
	Arisaema meleagris Buchet	1911	China (Chongqing, Sichuan, Yunnan)
	Arisaema lushuiense G.W.Hu & H.Li	2012	China (Yunnan)
	Arisaema nepenthoides (Wallich) Martius ex Schott & Endlicher	1832	China (Xizang, Yunnan), Bhutan, India (Darjeeling, Sikkim), Myanmar, Nepal
	Arisaema vietnamense Luu, Q. B. Nguyen, H. C. Nguyen & T. Q. T. Nguyen	2022	Vietnam (Lai Chau)
	Arisaema wattii J. D. Hooker	1893	China (Xizang, Yunnan), India (Assam, Manipur), Myanmar
