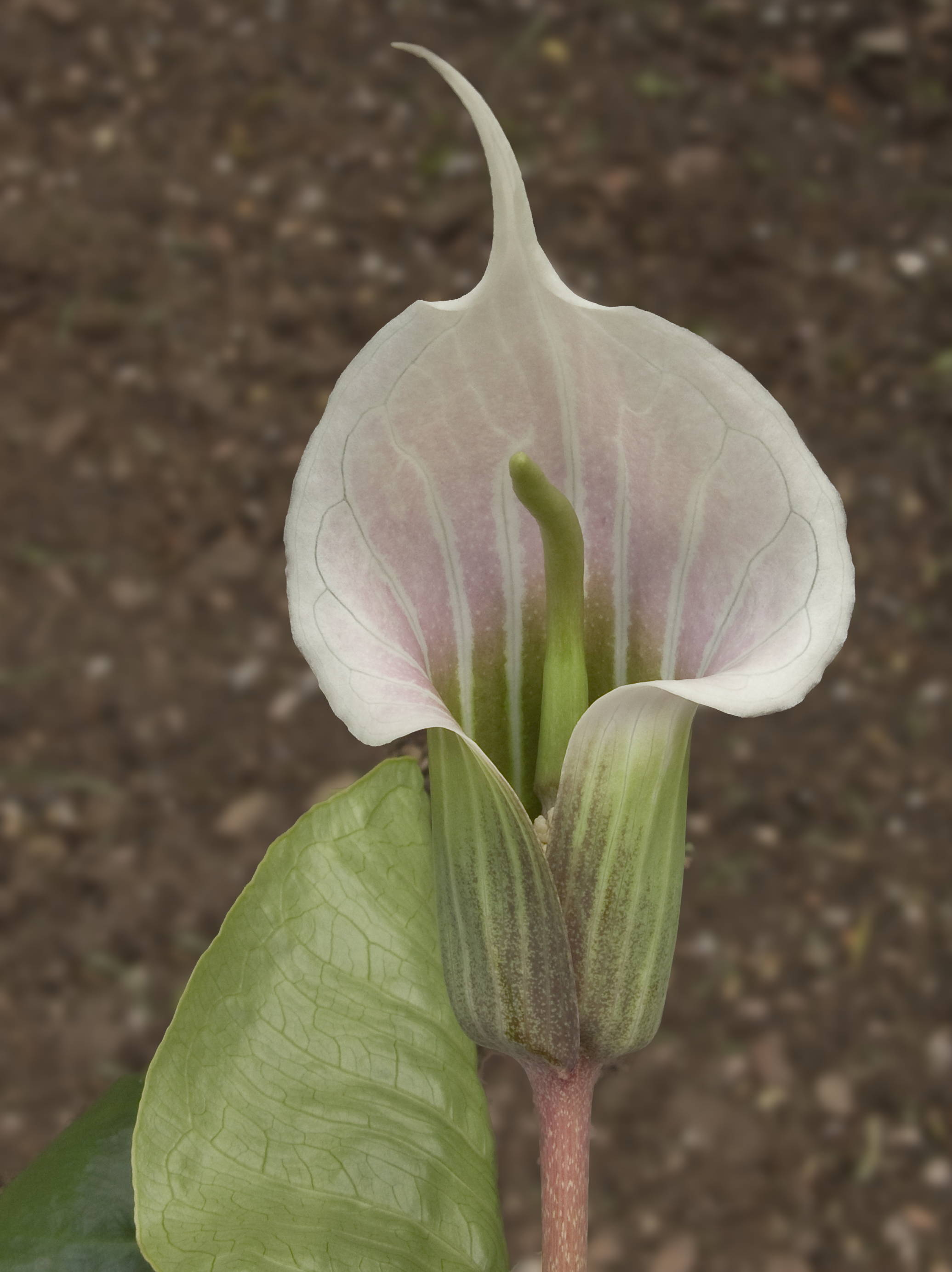

Scientific classification
- Kingdom: Plantae
- Clade: Tracheophytes
- Clade: Angiosperms
- Clade: Monocots
- Order: Alismatales
- Family: Araceae
- Genus: Arisaema
- Species: A. candidissimum

Binomial name
- Arisaema candidissimum W.W.Sm.

= Arisaema candidissimum =

Species of flowering plant

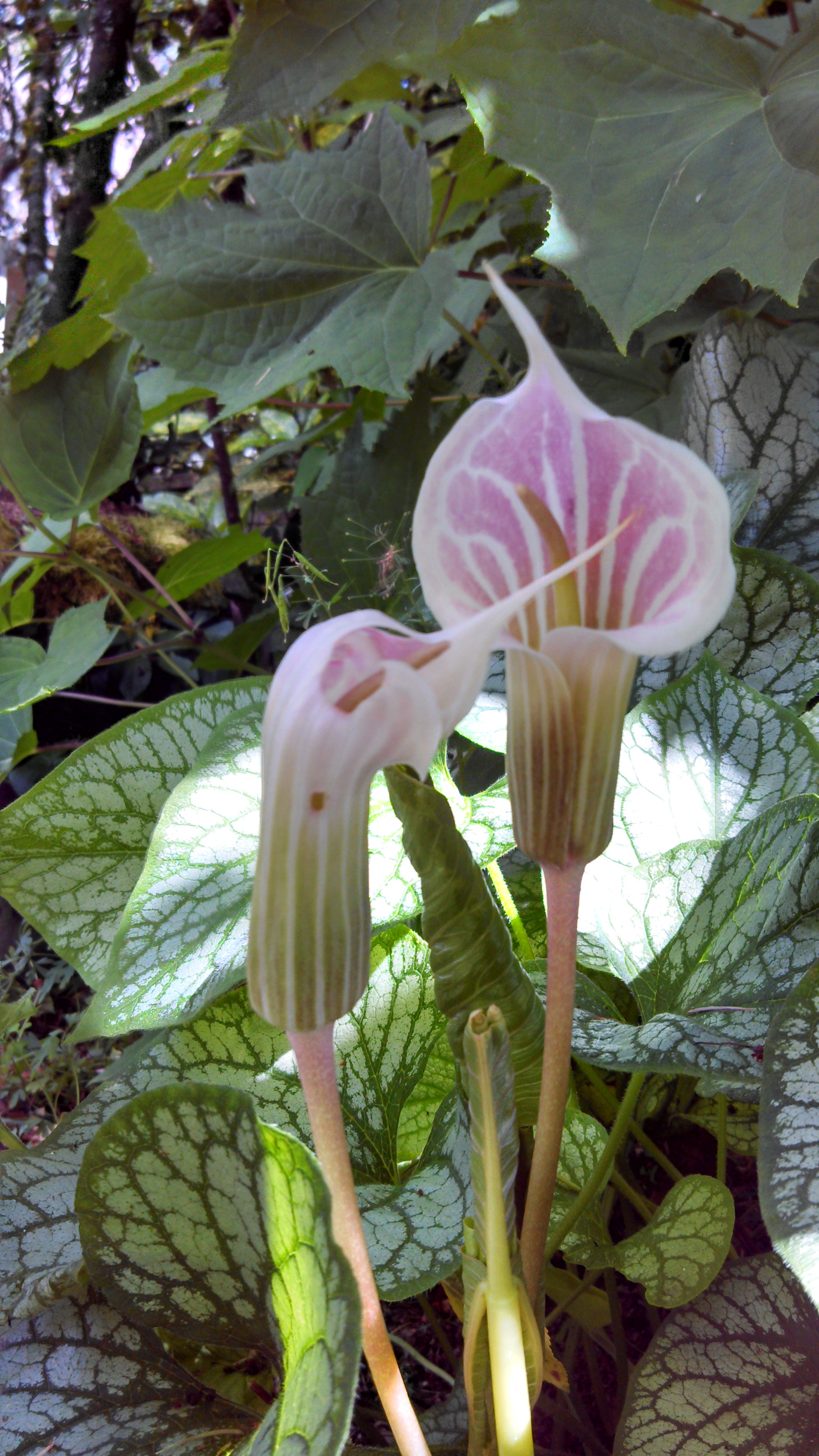

Arisaema candidissimum is a species of flowering plant in the arum family (Araceae), originating in western China (Tibet, Sichuan, Yunnan). Various English names have been given to the species, including Chinese cobra lily and Chinese jack-in-the-pulpit. The Chinese name is 白苞南星 (bai bao nan xing).

== Description ==
It is usually described as growing from tubers, although the AGS Encyclopaedia of Alpines says that most Arisaema species grow from corms "often described wrongly as tubers". It does not appear above the ground until late spring or early summer (typically June in the British Isles). The inflorescence is produced before the leaves open fully and is of the usual aroid shape. The small flowers are at the base of a thin spadix which is surrounded by a hood-like spathe. The spathe is 8–10 cm (3–4 in) long, on a stem about 15 cm (6 in) tall. It varies in colour, typically being white, often pinkish or greenish white or cream, with stripes which are green on the outside and pink on the inside. The leaves are about 30 cm (12 in) long with three lobes, each up to 20 cm (8 in) long.

Arisaema candidissimum grows in oak forests and shrubby valleys, at altitudes of 2,200–3,300 m (7,200–10,800 ft).

The specific epithet candidissimum means "shining white".

== Cultivation ==
Brian Mathew considers it by far the best species of Arisaema for British gardens and recommends growing it in a warm, sunny place, although it should not be too dry in summer. A list produced for the International Aroid Society says it is hardy to −20 °F (−30 °C), USDA Zone 4b. Two clones were originally introduced into cultivation by Forrest, one pale pink, the other pure white. Forms introduced later by Chinese suppliers include plants with darker, reddish-pink stripes.

This plant has gained the Royal Horticultural Society's Award of Garden Merit.
