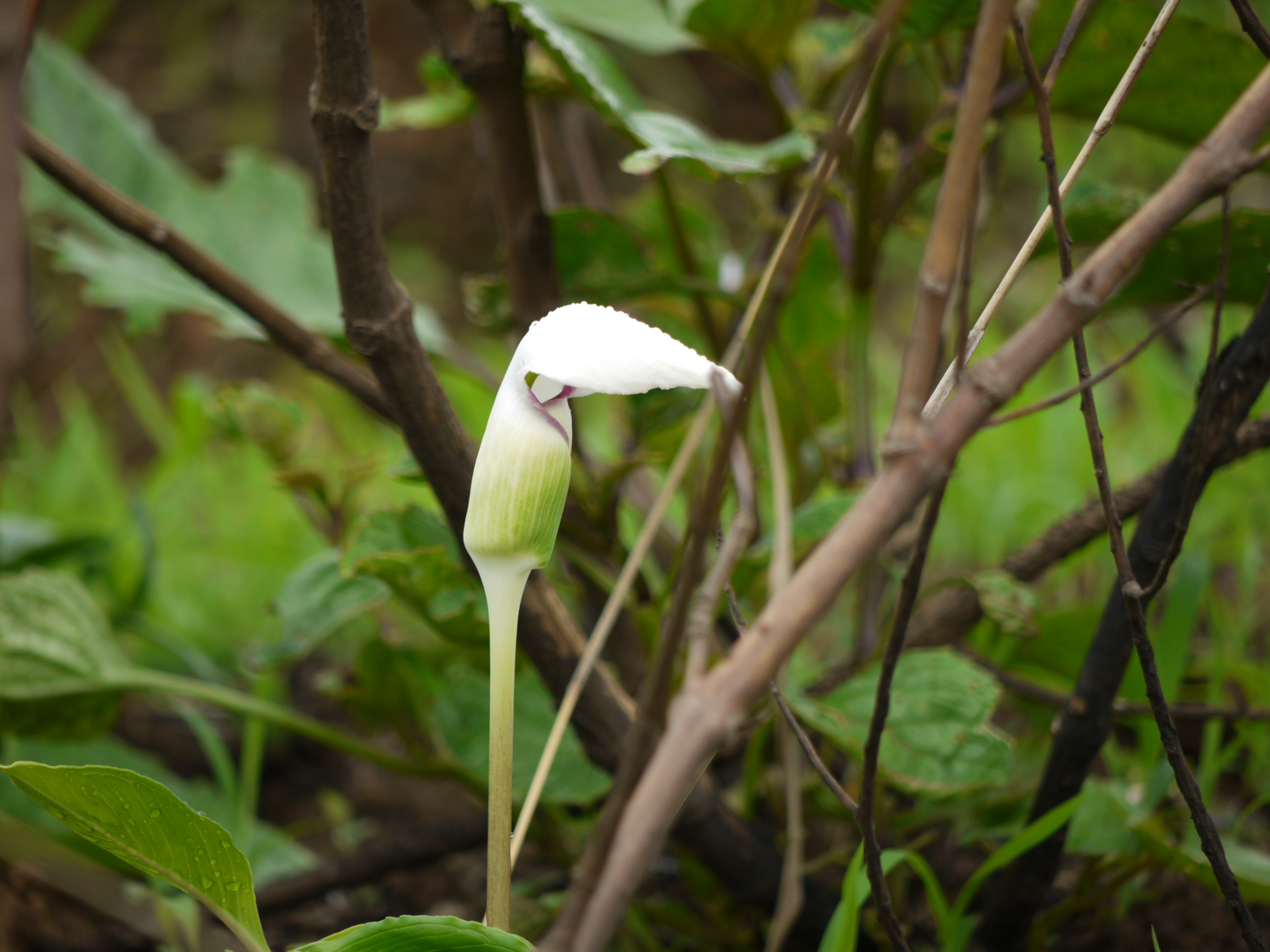

Scientific classification
- Kingdom: Plantae
- Clade: Tracheophytes
- Clade: Angiosperms
- Clade: Monocots
- Order: Alismatales
- Family: Araceae
- Genus: Arisaema
- Species: A. murrayi

Binomial name
- Arisaema murrayi (J.Graham) Hook.

= Arisaema murrayi =

Species of flowering plant

Arisaema murrayi, commonly called Murray's cobra lily or snake lily, is a species of flowering plant. It got its name due to its flower which often resembles with cobra snake's hood.

== Distribution ==
In the Indian subcontinent, Murray's Cobra Lily is primarily distributed across the Himalayan regions and the Western Ghats. It typically grows as understory vegetation in hilly forests and on gentle open slopes among shrubs, being especially abundant in Mahabaleshwar. The species occurs at altitudes ranging from 600 to 1200 meters above sea level.
