= Arisaema sect. Odorata =

- Arisaema saxatile

Scientific classification
- Kingdom: Plantae
- Clade: Tracheophytes
- Clade: Angiosperms
- Clade: Monocots
- Order: Alismatales
- Family: Araceae
- Genus: Arisaema
- Section: Arisaema sect. Odorata; Murata et al. 2013

Type species
- Arisaema odoratum

Species
- See text

Subgenus of flowering plants

Arisaema section Odorata is a section of the genus Arisaema. This section was described in 2013 in "A nomenclatural review on the infrageneric classification of Arisaema (Araceae)" in the Journal of Japanese Botany.

== Description ==
Plants in this section are winter dormant with leaves that are trifoliolate or pedate to radiate. The flower spadix is female or monoecious.

== Distribution ==
Plants from this section are distributed in China, Vietnam, Myanmar, and Thailand.

== Species ==
Arisaema section Odorata comprises the following species:

Image	Name	Year	Distribution
	Arisaema aridum H. Li	1977	China (Sichuan, Yunnan)
	Arisaema bathycoleum Hand.-Mazz.	1925	China (Sichuan, Yunnan)
	Arisaema lidaense J. Murata & S. G. Wu	2003	China (Yunnan), Vietnam
	Arisaema longitubum Z.X.Ma	2018	China (Yunnan)
	Arisaema mairei H. Lév.	1915	China (Sichuan, Yunnan)
	Arisaema odoratum J. Murata & S. G. Wu	1994	China (Yunnan)
	Arisaema prazeri Hook. f.	1893	China (Yunnan), Myanmar, Thailand
	Arisaema saxatile Buchet	1911	China (Sichuan, Yunnan)
	Arisaema yunnanense Buchet	1911	China (Guizhou, Sichuan, Yunnan), Myanmar, Thailand, Vietnam
