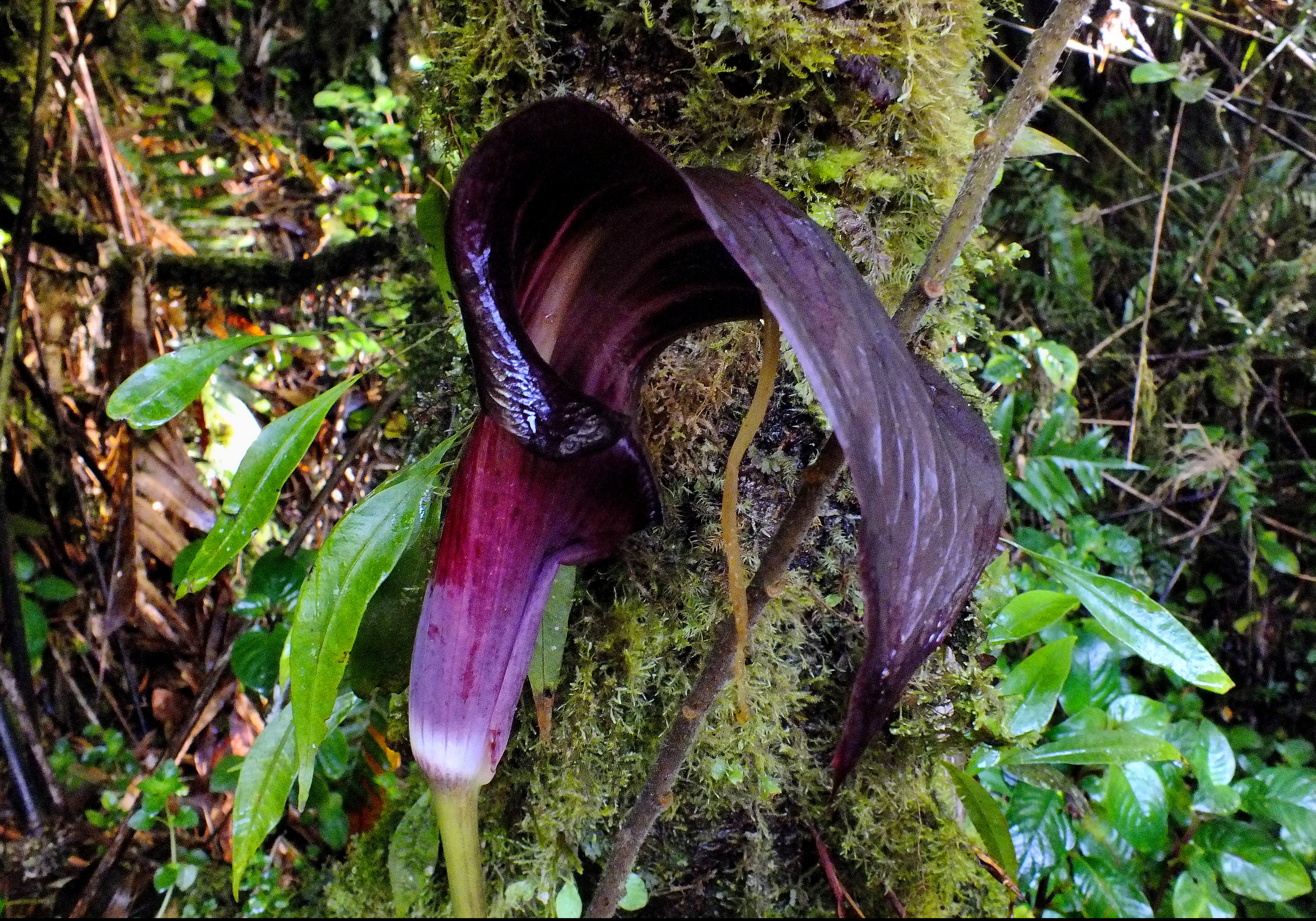
- Arisaema filiforme

Scientific classification
- Kingdom: Plantae
- Clade: Embryophytes
- Clade: Tracheophytes
- Clade: Angiosperms
- Clade: Monocots
- Order: Alismatales
- Family: Araceae
- Genus: Arisaema
- Section: Arisaema sect. Anomala; Gusman & L. Gusman 2003

Type species
- Arisaema anomalum

Species
- See text

= Arisaema sect. Anomala =

Subgenus of flowering plants

Arisaema section Anomala is a section of the genus Arisaema.

== Description ==
Plants in this section are evergreen and subtropical to tropical with rhizomes with a reddish purple interior. Leaves are trifoliate, Spadix bisexual or rarely unisexual when mature.

== Distribution ==
Plants from this section are found from China and India to Southeast Asia.

== Species ==
Arisaema section Anomala comprises the following species:

Image	Name	Year	Distribution
	Arisaema anomalum Hemsley	1887	Peninsular Malaysia.
	Arisaema balaense Engl.	1920	Vietnam, Thailand
	Arisaema bannaense H.Li	1988	China (Yunnan)
	Arisaema brinchangense Y.W.Low, Scherber. & Gusman	2016	Peninsular Malaysia (Cameron Highlands)
	Arisaema claviforme Brugg., J.Ponert, Rybková & Vuong	2013	Vietnam.
	Arisaema chumponense Gagnep.	1941	Thailand
	Arisaema filiforme (Reinw.) Blume	1836	Borneo, Java, Lesser Sunda Islands, Malaya, Sumatera
	Arisaema garrettii Gagnep.	1941	Thailand
	Arisaema grapsospadix Hayata	1915	Taiwan
	Arisaema hainanense C. Y. Wu ex H. Li, Y. Shiao & S. L. Tseng	1977	China (Hainan.)
	Arisaema langbiangense Luu, Nguyen-Phi & H.T.Van	2016	Vietnam
	Arisaema lihengianum J. Murata & S. K. Wu	2003	China (Guangxi), Vietnam
	Arisaema menglaense Y. H. Ji, H. Li & Z. F. Xu	2004	China (Yunnan)
	Arisaema nonghinense Klinrat. & Yannawat	2014	Thailand
	Arisaema omkoiense Gusman	2001	Thailand
	Arisaema ornatum Miq.	1856	Sumatra
	Arisaema pattaniense Gagnep.	1941	Thailand
	Arisaema petelotii K. Krause	1932	China (Yunnan), Vietnam
	Arisaema petiolulatum J. D. Hooker	1894	China (Yunnan), India, Myanmar
	Arisaema pingbianense H. Li	1988	China (Yunnan)
	Arisaema rostratum V.D.Nguyen & P.C.Boyce	2005	Vietnam
	Arisaema rubrirhizomatum H. Li & J. Murata	2010	China (Yunnan)
	Arisaema scortechinii Hook.f.	1893	Malaysia
	Arisaema setosum A.S.Rao & D.M.Verma	1971	India (Arunachal Pradesh.)
	Arisaema smitinandii S. Y. Hu	1968	China (Xizang), Thailand
	Arisaema umbrinum Ridl.	1905	Borneo
	Arisaema victoriae V. D. Nguyen	2000	China (Guangxi), Vietnam
	Arisaema wrayi Hemsl.	1887	Peninsular Thailand to Peninsular Malaysia, Borneo (Sabah)

== See also ==
- List of Arisaema species
