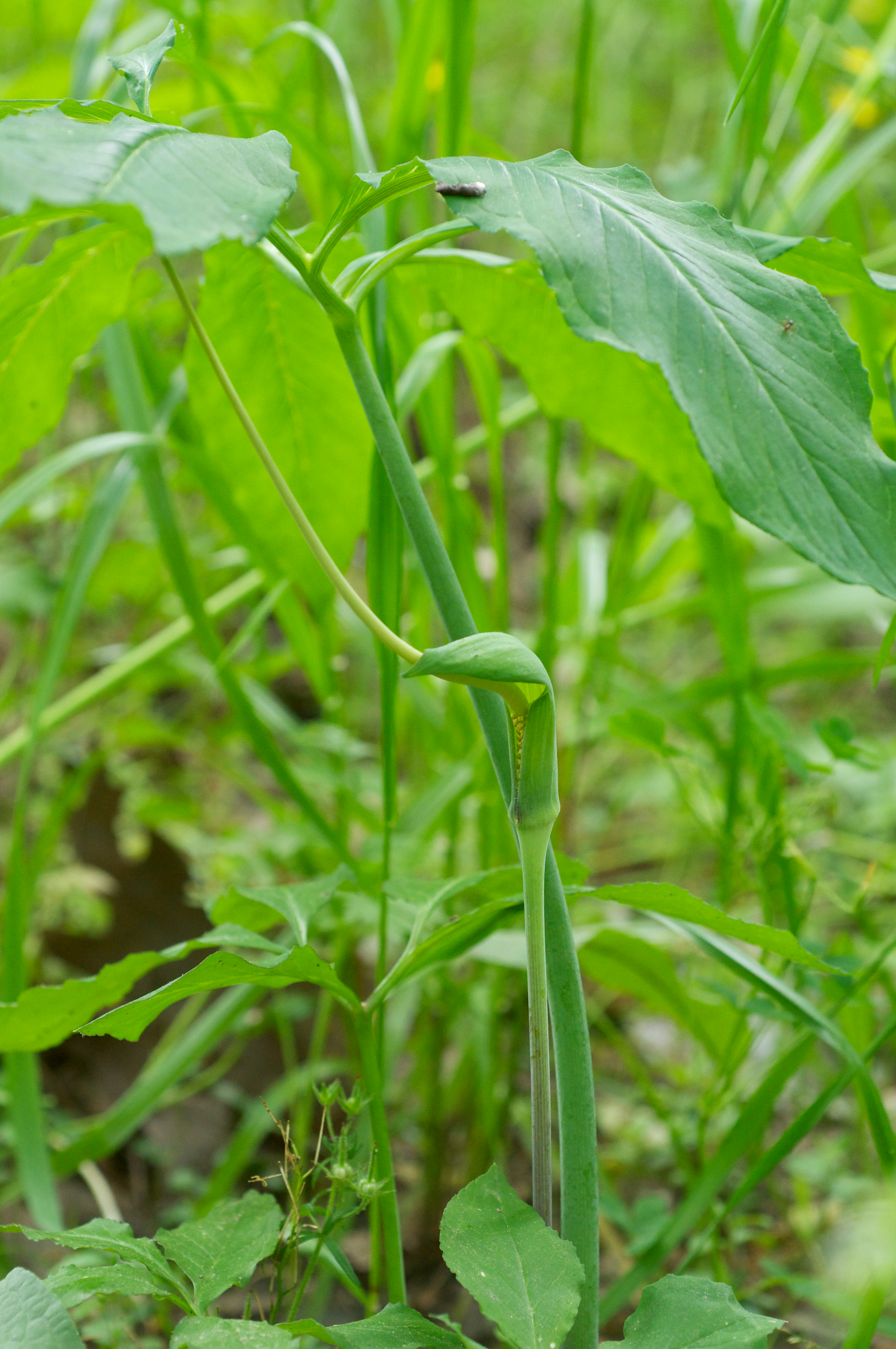

Conservation status
- Secure (NatureServe)

Scientific classification
- Kingdom: Plantae
- Clade: Embryophytes
- Clade: Tracheophytes
- Clade: Angiosperms
- Clade: Monocots
- Order: Alismatales
- Family: Araceae
- Genus: Arisaema
- Species: A. dracontium

Binomial name
- Arisaema dracontium (L.) Schott

= Arisaema dracontium =

Species of flowering plant

Arisaema dracontium, the dragon-root, dragon arum, or green dragon, is a herbaceous perennial plant in the genus Arisaema and the family Araceae. It is native to North America from Quebec through Minnesota south through Florida and Texas, where it is found growing in damp woods. It has also been reported from northeastern Mexico (Nuevo León + Veracruz) It is listed as a vulnerable species in Canada and Minnesota.

The species epithet, dracontium, is Latin for "little dragon".

Harriet Martineau, in recounting her travels in America in the 1830s, reported observing a young woman "rubbing her teeth with dragon-root."

== Classification ==
Within the genus Arisaema, A. dracontium is classified in the section Tortuosa and is most closely related to the Mexican A. macrospathum. In fact, A. macrospathum has sometimes been considered a subspecies of A. dracontium. The rest of the section contains species from east Asia and India. A. dracontium is not a close relative to the other American Arisaema species, A. triphyllum (jack-in-the-pulpit), which is in a different section of Arisaema. Like A. triphyllum, the tuberous taproot can cause a burning sensation if eaten raw.

== Morphology ==
Plants grow 20–50 centimetres (7.9–19.7 in) tall when in bloom and after flowering reach 100 centimetres (39 in), and each grows from a corm. Normally, a plant produces one leaf with a long petiole, its leaf is composed of 7 to 13 leaflets, with its central leaflet being the largest one and with leaflets becoming smaller as they are produced distally, the leaflets are held out horizontally over the plant. During flowering in spring, a single slender, green spathe 3–6 centimetres (1.2–2.4 in) long is produced; it covers a tapering, long thin spadix. The tail-like spadix grows out around the top of its spathe. After flowering, up to 150 berries are produced in a club-shaped column. In late summer, the green berries turn orange-red, each berry produces 1 to 3 seeds.

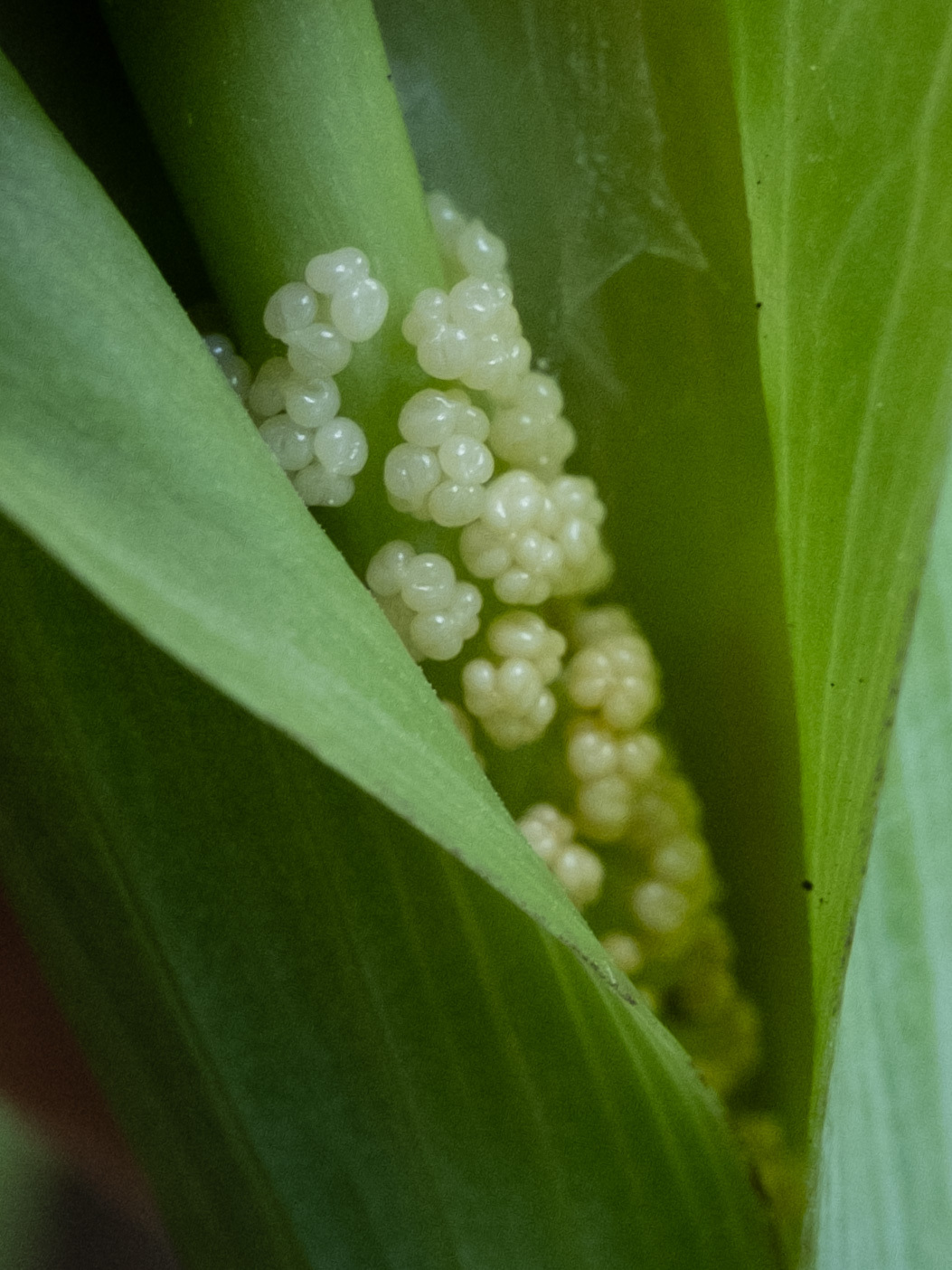
A spadix enclosed in a spathe, or bract on an Arisaema dracontium plant.
