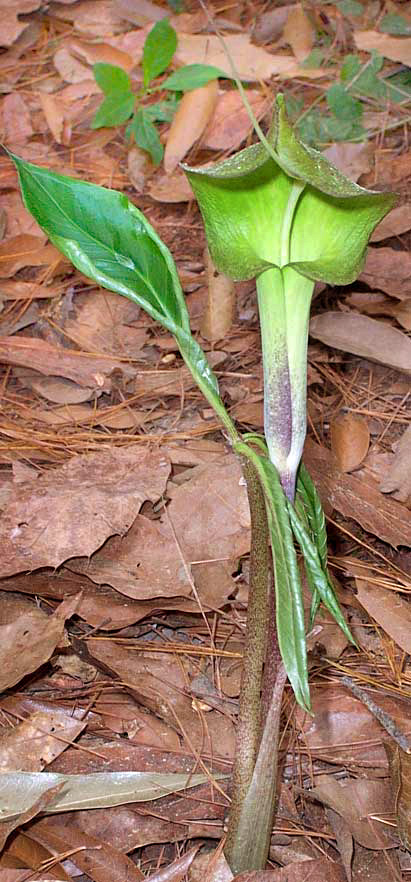

Scientific classification
- Kingdom: Plantae
- Clade: Tracheophytes
- Clade: Angiosperms
- Clade: Monocots
- Order: Alismatales
- Family: Araceae
- Genus: Arisaema
- Species: A. macrospathum

Binomial name
- Arisaema macrospathum Benth.

Synonyms
- Arisaema dracontium var. macrospathum (Benth) Huttl. ex D.BWard; Amorphophallus granatensis Engl.

= Arisaema macrospathum =

Species of plant

Arisaema macrospathum, with no commonly used English common names other than those applied to all members of the genus -- cobra lily in Asia and Jack-in-the-pulpit in the Americas—is a herbaceous and perennial plant. The species is endemic just to Mexico. With monocotyledonous features, it is a member of the family Araceae.

== Description ==
The outstanding feature distinguishing Arisaema macrospathum from other attractive wildflowers—but which is typical for all species of the Araceae—is that its small flowers are born on a special kind of finger-shaped inflorescence called a spadix. The spadix usually is accompanied by a modified leaf, the spathe. Beyond these basic field marks, Arisaema macrospathum exhibits these noteworthy attributes:

- Growing up to 1 m (3 ft 3 in) tall, its rolled leaf base forms a false stem, which arises from a potato-shaped underground tuber bearing buds. The false stem is accompanied by a few reduced, small leaves called cataphylls, the longest developing up to 25 cm (9.8 in) long; these bear longitudinal, purple lines.
- The single leaf's petiole, the false stem, is up to 60 cm (24 in) long, with purple blotches. The blade is divided into 5-11 divisions generally elliptic in shape and up to 23 cm (9.1 in) long, and radiating from one point atop the petiole. When the leaf emerges, the central leaflet stands erect. Leaflet margins are finely toothed.
- The spathe consists of a blade with the lower half forming a slender tube surrounding the flower-bearing spadix, while the top half spreads out presenting a kind of hood behind the spadix's slender top, the appendage, emerging from the tube. Mostly it's green but with purplish tinting.
- The spadix is topped with a very slender, curvy appendage emerging from the spathe's tube, which gradually decreases in thickness toward its apex, reaching up to 15 cm (6 in) long. The spadix's fertile part remains hidden in the spathe's tube.
- Flowers are very small, with no perianth. Plants either bear only male flowers, or only female flowers. Occupying up to 3 cm (1.2 in) of the spadix's bottom part, the male flowers with yellow, pollen-producing anthers are scattered over the spadix's surface, while female flowers, each with a green, cylindrical ovary, are densely clustered.
- Berry-type fruits, orange when mature and up to 10 mm (3/8 in) long, and appear densely clustered when the spathe wilts away. The cluster itself can be up to 5 cm (2.0 in) long and 3 cm (1 1/8 in) across. There up to 4 cream-colored seeds per fruit, usually two or three, up to 4.5 mm (1/8 in) long.

=== Sex changing ===
A study of a population of Arisaema macrospathum in a cloud forest in El Cielo Biosphere Reserve in the northeastern Mexican state of Tamaulipas found that only plants with either all male flowers, or else all female flowers, were observed; a mixture of male and female flowers on the same spadix wasn't seen. All-female plants were significantly larger than plants with male flowers.

This observation can be seen in the light of numerous studies which have found that within individual Arisaema species smaller plants produce only male flowers, while larger plants produce produce both male and female flowers on one spadix, or else only female flowers. Experimentally, removing a plant's leaf area, or changing its soil nutrient levels can change whether male and/or female flowers are produced. It's presumed that Arisaema macrospathum also can change sex as growing conditions alter.

== Distribution ==
Arisaema macrospathum occurs naturally only in Mexico. Within Mexico, it's found in mountains in the west from the states of Nayarit and Colima south to Oaxaca, and in mountains of the east from southern Tamaulipas south to Puebla.

== Habitat ==
In central Mexico, Arisaema macrospathum occurs in mountainous mesophytic forests, oak forests and forests of pine, tropical forests with deciduous leaves and dry scrubland, at elevations of 600 m (2,000 ft) to 2,300 m (7,500 ft). It has a preference for canyons and shady places. In the Eastern Sierra Madre mountains of southern Tamaulipas state, it grows in cloud forest.

== Conservation status ==
In Mexico's Veracruz state Arisaema macrospathum occurs in only nine known locations, where the habitat is severely fragmented and suffers a continuing decline due to ongoing deforestation. In Veracruz it is assessed as endangered.

== Human uses ==
=== In gardening ===
Arisaema macrospathum only rarely turns up in gardens. As a garden candidate, the species distinguishes itself by its unusually high-growing leaves and the extraordinarily long spadix sticking out of the spathe tube.

=== As food ===
Arisaema macrospathum has been reported as having "edible roots" eaten by ancient Mexicans, in this case the Aztecs. The tubers surely had to be cooked because it's assumed that the tubers of Arisaema macrospathum, like the very similar and closely related green dragon, Arisaema dracontium, of North America, contains calcium oxalate, which is poisonous in an uncooked state.

== Taxonomy ==
For a long time the taxonomy of the very closely related North American species Arisaema macrospathum and Arisaema dracontium has been confused. However, these two species occur in separate, non-overlapping distribution areas, have different ecological preferences and elevational ranges, plus there are other differences, so now the general consensus is that these two species are distinct.

Arisaema macrospathum is assigned to the mostly Asian section Tortuosa of the genus Arisaema.

Arisaema macrospathum is one of many species scientifically collected for the first time by the German botanist Karl Theodor Hartweg, in Mexico from 1836 to 1839 and again in 1845–46. Hartweg made his collections available to the English botanist George Bentham, who formally published the species. In Bentham's formal description, he remarks that the type specimen grew in a shady forest at Morelia, which is in the Mexican state of Michoacán.

=== Phylogeny ===
Phylogenetic analysis using DNA isolation and amplification, and sequence alignment, suggests that Arisaema macrospathum, along with the closely related A. dracontium, diverged from Asian relatives approximately 31–49 million years ago. It's to be noted that Arisaema macrospathum and A. dracontium are quite similar to the Asian A. heterophyllum. Ancestors of the American species are thought to have migrated across Beringia from Asia.

=== Etymology ===
The genus name Arisaema is based on the Greek aris, which was a plant name used by Pliny, and haima, meaning "blood." Thus: "plant having to do with blood," which describes the red-spotted leaves of some Arisaema species.

The species name macrospathum clearly derives from the Greek makro-, a combining form of makrós, meaning "long, tall, high, large." The -spathum is a New Latin construction based on the Latin spatha, leading to the word "spathe", and originally meaning "broadsword." Therefore, "big spathe, shaped like a broadsword," which is close enough to describing the large spathe of Arisaema macrospathum.
