= Arisaema decipiens =

Scientific classification
- Kingdom: Plantae
- Clade: Tracheophytes
- Clade: Angiosperms
- Clade: Monocots
- Order: Alismatales
- Family: Araceae
- Genus: Arisaema
- Species: A. decipiens

Binomial name
- Arisaema decipiens Schott 1857

Synonyms
- Arisaema guixiense S. Y. Liu; Arisaema rhizomatum C. E. C. Fischer; Arisaema rhizomatum var. nudum C. E. C. Fischer; Arisaema rhizomatum var. viride C. E. C. Fischer

Species of plant

Arisaema decipiens is a species of plant native to China (Guangxi, Guizhou, Hunan, Sichuan, Tibet and Yunnan) as well as India, Myanmar, and Vietnam. It grows in evergreen forest at elevations of 600–1,600 m (2,000–5,200 ft).

== Taxonomy ==
This plant is in monotypic in its own section Arisaema sect. Decipientia (Engler) H. Li in C. Y. Wu & H. Li 1979 distinguished by having branching underground cylindric rhizomes and around two pedate leaves.
