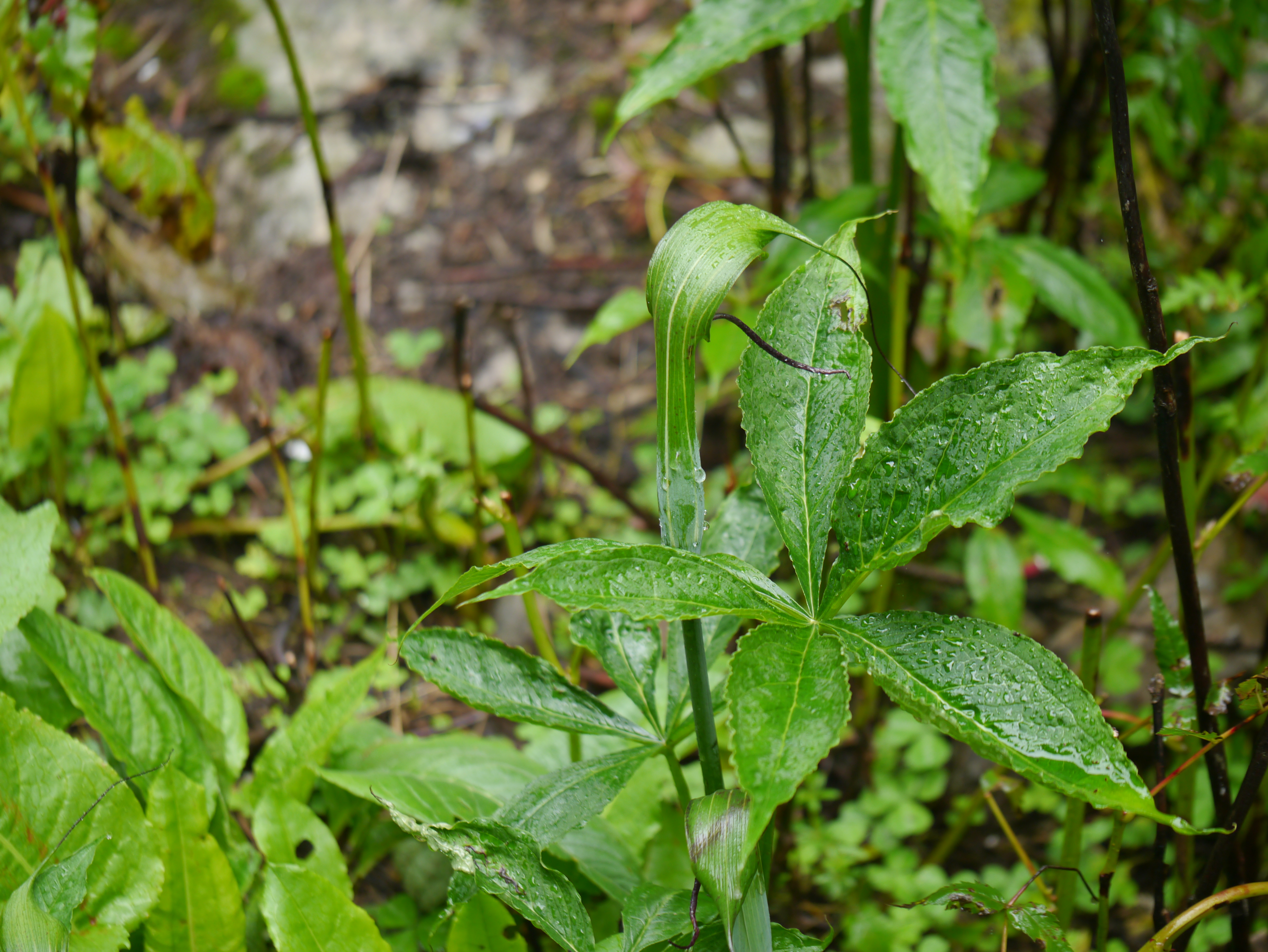

Scientific classification
- Kingdom: Plantae
- Clade: Tracheophytes
- Clade: Angiosperms
- Clade: Monocots
- Order: Alismatales
- Family: Araceae
- Genus: Arisaema
- Species: A. jacquemontii

Binomial name
- Arisaema jacquemontii Blume

Synonyms
- Arisaema cornutum Arisaema exile

= Arisaema jacquemontii =

Species of plant

Arisaema jacquemontii is a species of flowering plant from the family Araceae that can be found growing on rocky slopes and in the forests on the elevation of 2,400–4,000 metres (7,900–13,100 ft) in 'Afghanistan, East Asia and Himalayas. The species name refers to French botanist Victor Jacquemont.

== Description ==
The species is 0.6 metres (2 ft 0 in) tall and 0.3 metres (1 ft 0 in) wide. The flowers bloom from June to July which are dioecious and bisexual. They are being pollinated by various flies.
