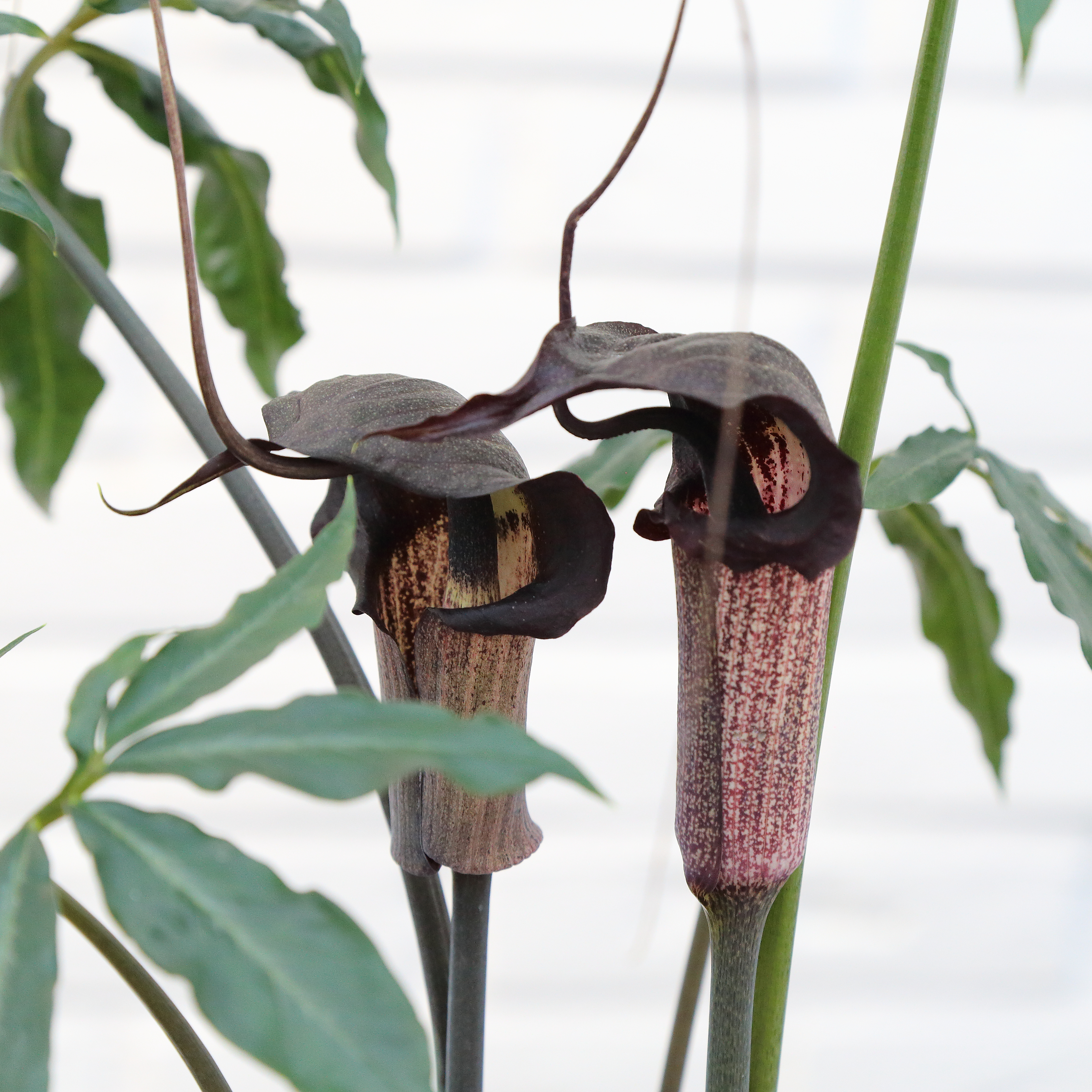
- Arisaema thunbergii subsp. urashima

Scientific classification
- Kingdom: Plantae
- Clade: Tracheophytes
- Clade: Angiosperms
- Clade: Monocots
- Order: Alismatales
- Family: Araceae
- Genus: Arisaema
- Species: A. thunbergii

Binomial name
- Arisaema thunbergii Blume (1836)

Subspecies
- Arisaema thunbergii subsp. autumnale J.C.Wang, J.Murata & H.Ohashi; Arisaema thunbergii subsp. thunbergii; Arisaema thunbergii subsp. urashima (H.Hara) H.Ohashi & J.Murata

Synonyms
- Flagellarisaema thunbergii (Blume) Nakai (1950)

= Arisaema thunbergii =

Species of plant

Arisaema thunbergii, commonly known as Asian jack-in-the-pulpit, is a plant species in the family Araceae. It is native to Japan, southern Korea, and Taiwan. In Japan it grows at elevations of 20–100 meters. The plant is poisonous as all parts contain calcium oxalate.

== Subspecies ==
Three subspecies are accepted.

- Arisaema thunbergii subsp. autumnale J.C.Wang, J.Murata & H.Ohashi – northern and eastern Taiwan
- Arisaema thunbergii subsp. thunbergii – southern Korea and Japan (western Honshu, Kyushu, and Shikoku)
- Arisaema thunbergii subsp. urashima (H.Hara) H.Ohashi & J.Murata – southern Korea and Japan (southern Hokkaido, Honshu, northern Kyushu, and eastern Shikoku)
