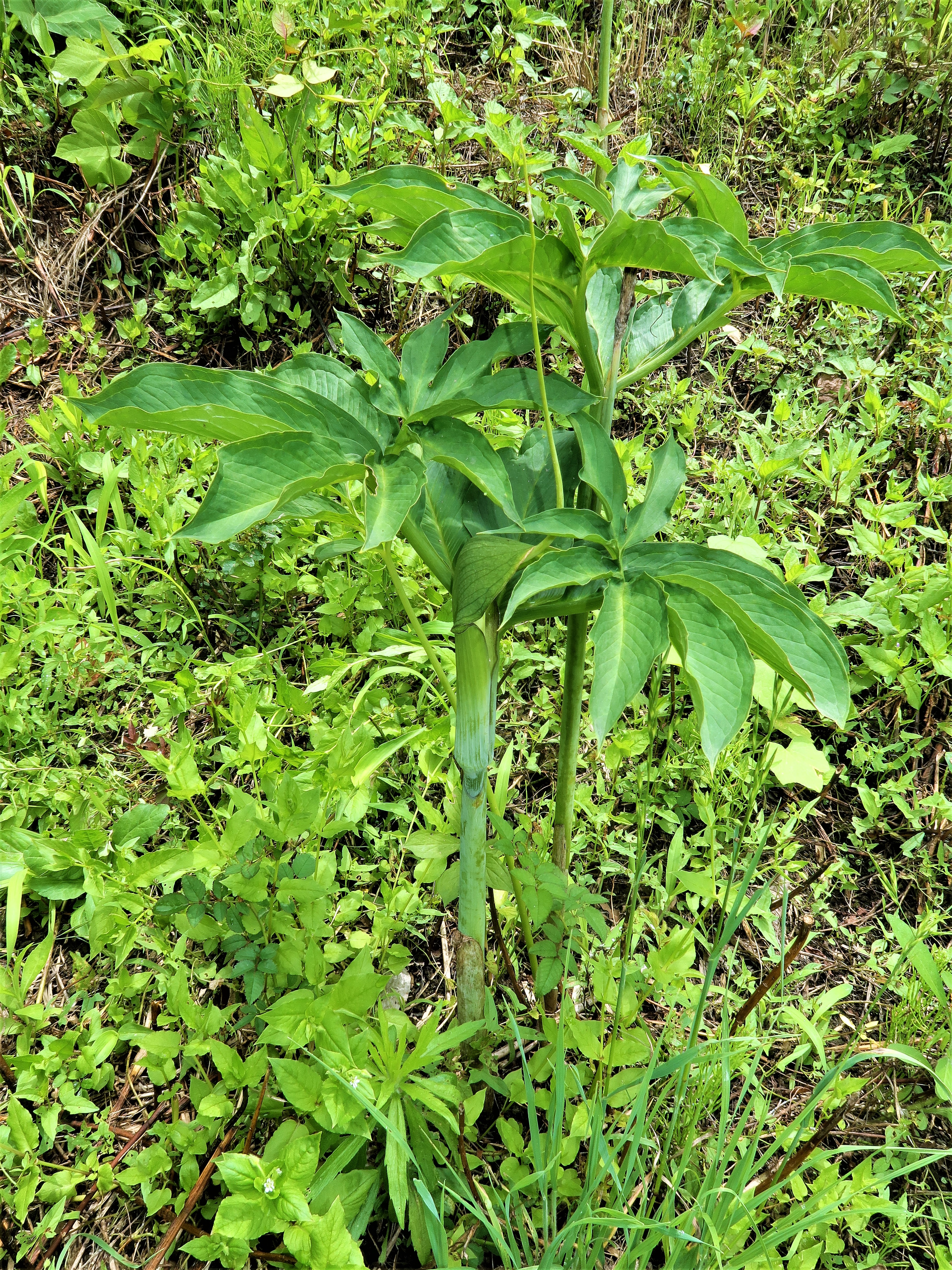

Scientific classification
- Kingdom: Plantae
- Clade: Embryophytes
- Clade: Tracheophytes
- Clade: Spermatophytes
- Clade: Angiosperms
- Clade: Monocots
- Order: Alismatales
- Family: Araceae
- Genus: Arisaema
- Species: A. heterophyllum

Binomial name
- Arisaema heterophyllum Blume.

= Arisaema heterophyllum =

Perennial, rhizomatous herb native to East Asia

Arisaema heterophyllum, the dancing crane cobra lily, belongs to the monocotyledonous flowering family Araceae. It is a perennial, rhizomatous herb native to East Asia. It has a spadix inflorescence and can be recognized by its green spathe and comparatively smaller central leaflet.

The rhizome is often used in Chinese traditional medicine as a treatment for coughs, epilepsy, and tetanus. It is prepared using ginger and potassium aluminum sulphate for purifying purposes.

== Description ==
The roots are tubular, depressed globose shaped, and around 2–6 cm in diameter. The usually solitary leaves are around 30–60 cm long, with glaucous petioles and sheathing adjacent to the pseudostem. They are sedately divided, adaxially dull green and abaxially pale green, and contain 4 or 5 cataphylls and multiple leaflets, ranging from 11 to 21 in number. The central leaflet is 3–15 cm long and 0.7-5.8 cm wide; the outermost leaflets are smaller. The distance between leaflets is around 0.5–5 cm. The leaves have a variety of shapes, such as oblanceolate, oblong, linear-oblong, base cuneate, and apex cuneate.

The peduncle of the flower is around 50–80 cm long, and is usually longer than the petiole. The flower also has a spathe tube that is cylindrical, 3.2–8 cm long, 1–2.5 cm wide, outside glaucous, inside whitish green, and its throat is slightly recurved. The spadix of the flower is either bisexual or monoecious and male. In the female part of the bisexual spadix it has a punctate stigma, a distinct style, and a globose ovary that contains 3 to 4 ovules; the male part contains sterile flowers. The anthers of the male spadix has thecae dehiscing by the apical slits. The pale white sigmoid appendix is 20 cm long, ascending, and gradually tapers from the sessile base to sharp apex. The flowering period usually starts in April or May, and continues from July to September. The fruits are cylindrical yellowish red or red berries that usually have 1 seed.

== Distribution and habitat ==
Arisaema heterophyllum is native to East Asia, including China, Inner Mongolia, Japan, and Korea. In China, it is grown across different provinces except for the Northwest region and Tibet. In Japan, it is grown in Honshu and Kyushu.

The species tends to grow in evergreen and deciduous riparian forests, shrublands, wetlands (inland) or grassland where shade is available and moisture is retained. It is closely associated with flood plains and prefers humus-rich and well-draining soil. The tuber is intolerant to low temperatures. In Japan, it is considered a threatened species due to the loss of riparian forest along the major rivers of Kanto Plain.

== Genetics ==
The plant contains Arisaema heterophyllum agglutinin (AHA), a substance that can cause blood particles to coagulate and aggregate. It was revealed that AHA had negative effects towards the feeding behaviour of the Indian Grain Aphid (Sitobion miscanthi), causing the aphids' lifespan to reduce significantly. Resistance towards Indian Grain Aphids in wheats was observed to have improved after intruding AHA to the plants.

== Traditional use of Arisaema ==
Many species within the genus Arisaema have medicinal uses in Chinese medicine.
