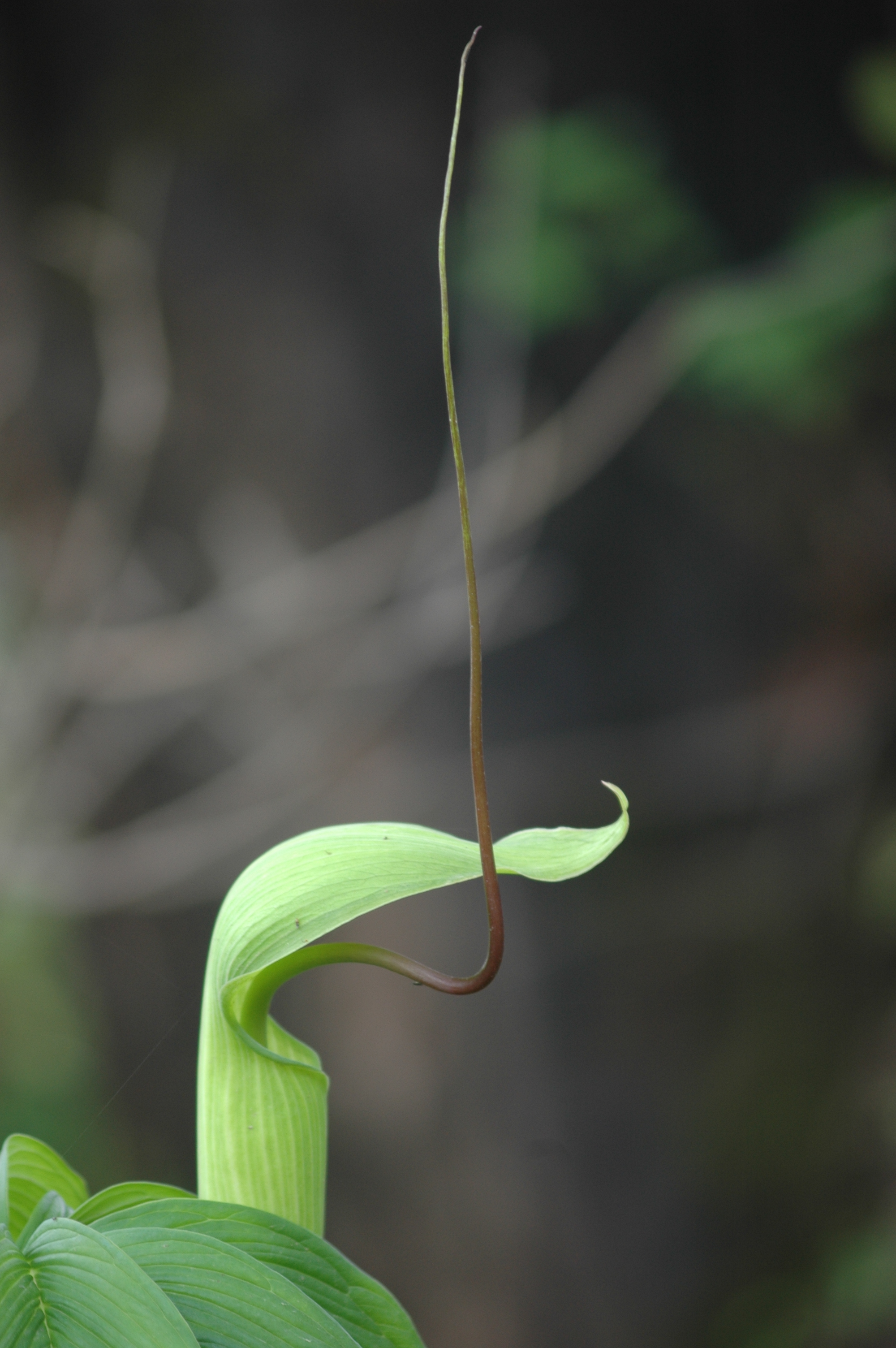
- Arisaema tortuosum near Purandar fort, Western Ghats, Maharashtra, India

Scientific classification
- Kingdom: Plantae
- Clade: Embryophytes
- Clade: Tracheophytes
- Clade: Spermatophytes
- Clade: Angiosperms
- Clade: Monocots
- Order: Alismatales
- Family: Araceae
- Genus: Arisaema
- Species: A. tortuosum

Binomial name
- Arisaema tortuosum (Wall.) Schott

= Arisaema tortuosum =

Species of plant

Arisaema tortuosum, the whipcord cobra lily, is a plant species in the family Araceae. It has a distinctive purple or green whip-like spadix which arises from the mouth of its "jack-in-the-pulpit" flower and may be up to 30 cm long. Flowers may be male or bisexual. The clustered fruits are green at first, ripening to red. The plant grows in large clumps and can be up to 2 metres in height.

It occurs in rhododendron forest, scrub, and alpine meadows in the Himalayas, western China, southern India and Myanmar.

The species is readily propagated from seed or offsets.
