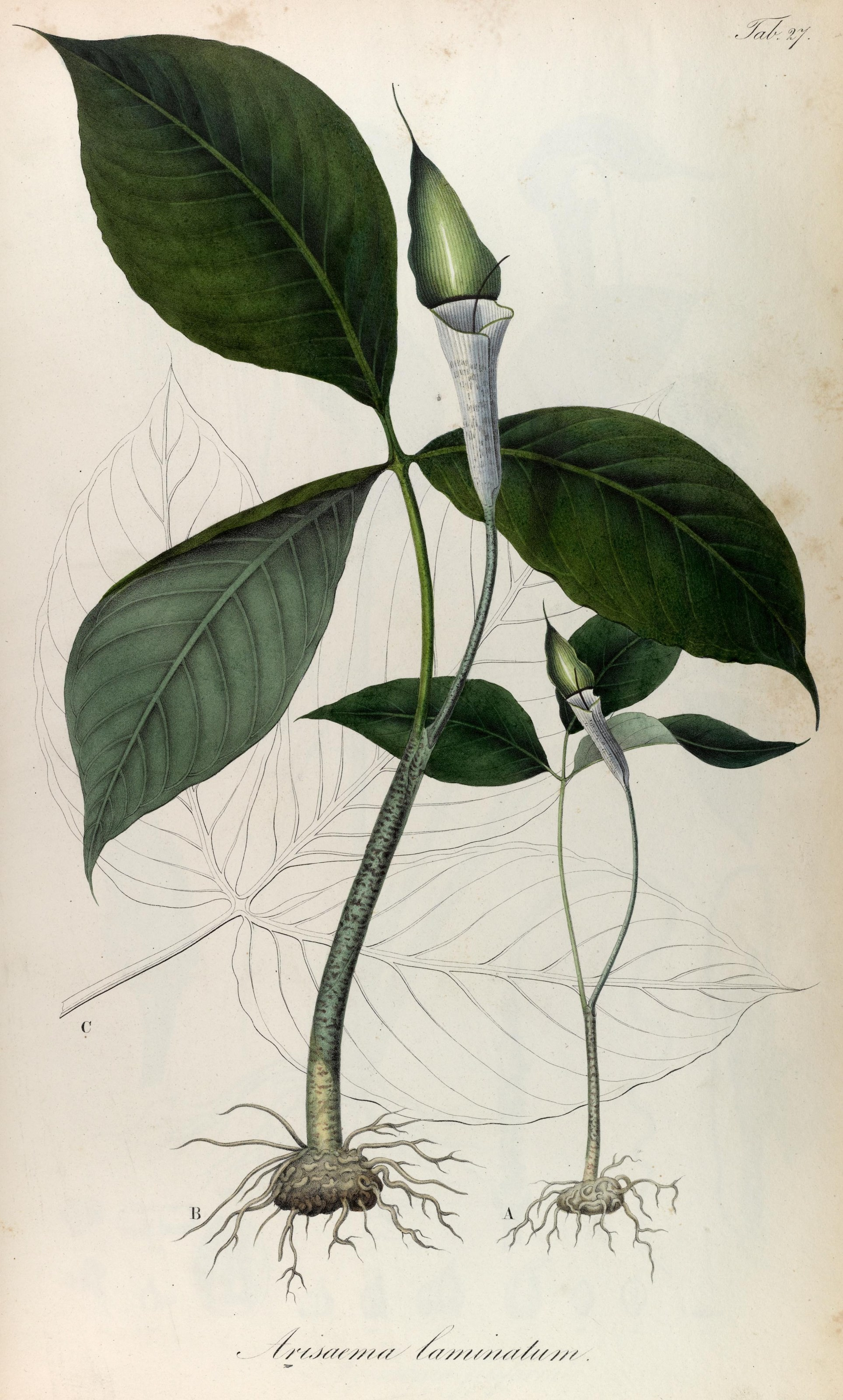
- Arisaema laminatum Illustration

Scientific classification
- Kingdom: Plantae
- Clade: Embryophytes
- Clade: Tracheophytes
- Clade: Spermatophytes
- Clade: Angiosperms
- Clade: Monocots
- Order: Alismatales
- Family: Araceae
- Genus: Arisaema
- Section: Arisaema sect. Attenuata (Engler) H. Li 2017

Type species
- Arisaema laminatum

Species
- See text

= Arisaema sect. Attenuata =

Subgenus of flowering plants

Arisaema section Attenuata is a section of the genus Arisaema found in tropical and subtropical habitats.

== Description ==
Plants in this section have trifoliate leaves, solitary axillary buds without accessory buds and a sessile spadix appendage that frequently bears sterile flowers.

== Distribution ==
Plants from this section are found from China to Southeast Asia.

== Species ==
Arisaema section Attenuata comprises the following species:

Image	Name	Year	Distribution
	Arisaema album N.E.Br.	1880	India (Arunachal Pradesh), Myanmar.
	Arisaema austroyunnanense H.Li	1977	China (Yunnan, Hainan) to Vietnam
	Arisaema averyanovii V.D.Nguyen & P.C.Boyce	2005	Vietnam
	Arisaema barbatum Buchet	1911	China (Yunnan), Peninsula Thailand, Java to Lesser Sunda Islands (Bali)
	Arisaema calcareum H.Li	1977	China (Yunnan)
	Arisaema chauvanminhii Luu, Q.D. Nguyen & N.L. Vu	2014	Vietnam
	Arisaema chenii Z.X. Ma & Yi Jun Huang	2018	China (Guangdong)
	Arisaema condaoense V.D.Nguyen	2000	Vietnam
	Arisaema guangxiense G.W.Hu & H.Li	2012	China (Guangxi)
	Arisaema honbaense Luu, Tich, G.Tran & V.D.Nguyen	2013	Vietnam
	Arisaema inclusum (N.E.Br.) N.E.Br. ex B.D.Jacks.	1893	Java, Lesser Sunda Islands, Sumatra
	Arisaema lackneri Engl.	1898	China (SW. Yunnan), Myanmar.
	Arisaema laminatum Blume	1836	Borneo, Java, Lesser Sunda Islands, Malaya, Philippines, Sumatra
	Arisaema liemiana Luu, H.T.Van, H.C.Nguyen & V.D.Nguyen	2020	Vietnam
	Arisaema maxwellii Hett. & Gusman	2011	Thailand
	Arisaema microspadix Engl.	1905	Java to Lesser Sunda Islands (C. Timor).
	Arisaema pachystachyum Hett. & Gusman	2003	Thailand
	Arisaema pallidum Engl.	1920	Sumatra
	Arisaema penicillatum N.E.Br.	1880	China (Guangdong, Guangxi, Hainan), Taiwan.
	Arisaema pierreanum Engl.	1920	Vietnam
	Arisaema ramulosum Alderw.	1922	Java to Lesser Sunda Islands
	Arisaema roxburghii Kunth	1841	India (Arunachal Pradesh, Assam), Cambodia, Laos, Malaya, Thailand, Vietnam
	Arisaema saddlepeakense P.S.N.Rao & S.K.Srivast.	1991	Andaman Is.
	Arisaema siamicum Gagnep.	2011	Thailand
	Arisaema sizemoreae Hett. & Gusman	2003	Thailand
