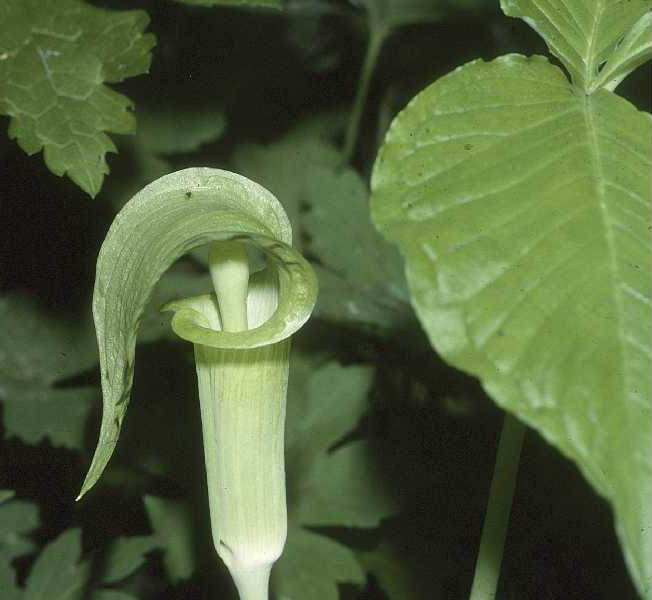
- Arisaema triphyllum

Scientific classification
- Kingdom: Plantae
- Clade: Embryophytes
- Clade: Tracheophytes
- Clade: Angiosperms
- Clade: Monocots
- Order: Alismatales
- Family: Araceae
- Subfamily: Aroideae
- Tribe: Arisaemateae
- Genus: Arisaema; Mart.

Diversity
- About 212 species
- Range of the genus Arisaema.

Synonyms
- Alocasia Neck. ex Raf.; Dochafa Schott; Muricauda Small; Flagellarisaema Nakai; Heteroarisaema Nakai; Pleuriarum Nakai; Ringentiarum Nakai

= Arisaema =

Genus of plants

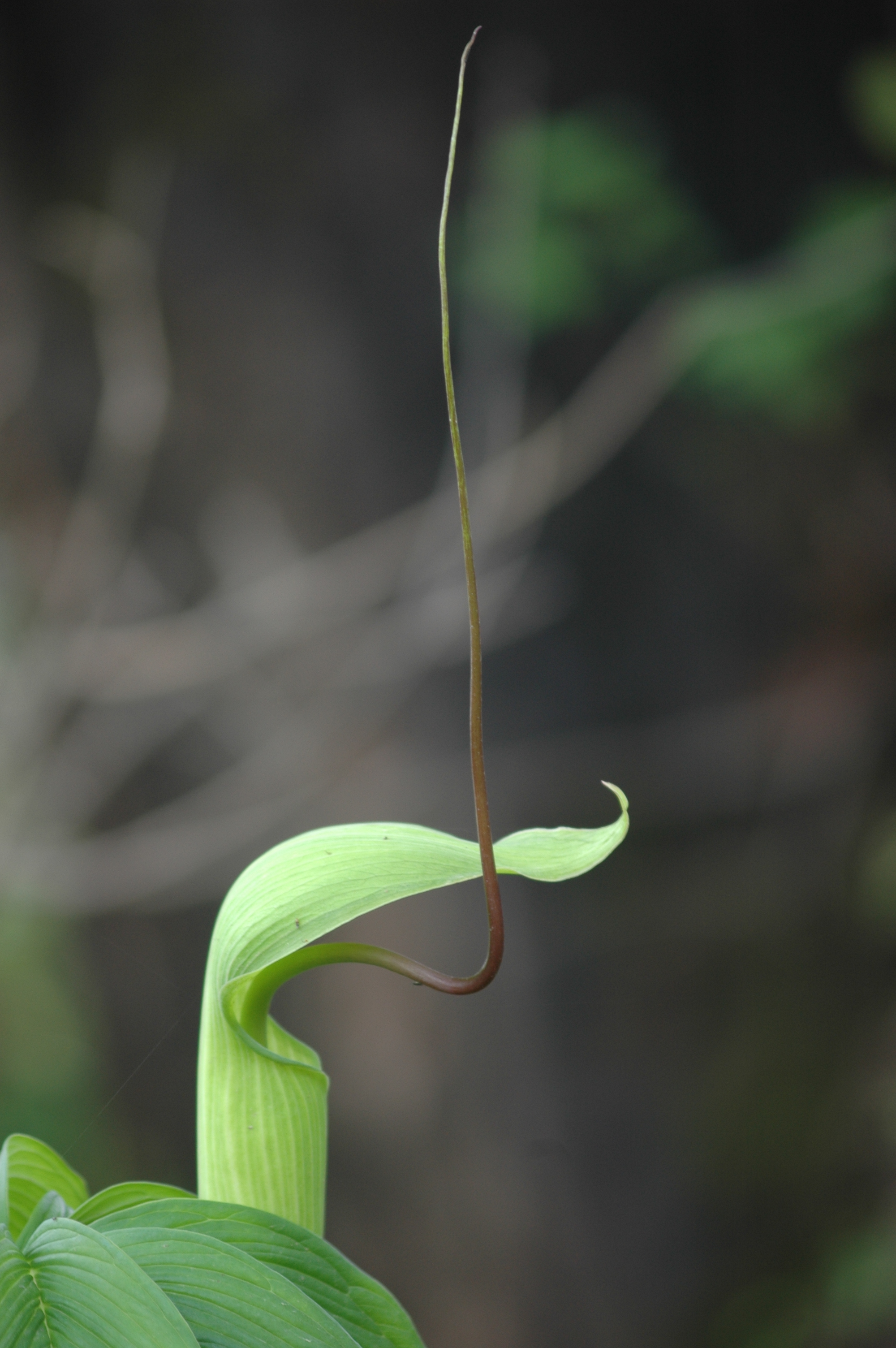
Arisaema tortuosum

Arisaema is a large and diverse genus of the flowering plant family Araceae. The largest concentration of species is in China and Japan, with other species native to other parts of southern Asia as well as eastern and central Africa, Mexico and eastern North America. Asiatic species are often called cobra lilies, while western species are often called jack-in-the-pulpit; both names refer to the distinctive appearance of the flower, which consists of an erect central spadix rising from a spathe.

== Classification and relationships ==
The closest relatives of Arisaema appear to be Pinellia and Typhonium (although the latter as defined in 2004 seems to be paraphyletic, having given rise to Arisaema and other genera). One unusual trait shared by all Arisaema species, and not those of other genera, is sequential hermaphroditism. Arisaema plants are typically male when small, and female or hermaphroditic when large, with a single plant capable of changing sex based on nutrition and genetics, and perhaps changing sex several times during its long life (20 years or more).

=== Sections ===
A phylogenetic study in 2016 by Ohi-toma et al. recognized 15 sections in the genus.

Image	Section	Type species
	A. sect. Anomala Gusman & L. Gusman 2003	Arisaema anomalum
	A. sect. Arisaema Li et al. 2010	Arisaema speciosum
	A. sect. Attenuata (Engler) H. Li 2017	Arisaema laminatum
	A. sect. Clavata (Engler) H. Hara 1971	Arisaema clavatum
	A. sect. Decipienta (Engler) H. Li in C. Y. Wu & H. Li 1979	Arisaema decipiens
	A. sect. Dochafa (Schott) H. Hara 1971	Arisaema flavum
	A. sect. Fimbriata (Engl.) H.Li 1979	Arisaema fimbriatum
	A. sect. Flagellarisaema (Nakai) H.Hara 1971	Arisaema thunbergii
	A. sect. Franchetiana (Engl.) H. Hara 1971	Arisaema franchetianum
	A. sect. Nepenthoidea (Engl.) H. Hara 1971	Arisaema nepenthoides
	A. sect. Odorata Murata et al. 2013	Arisaema odoratum
	A. sect. Pistillata (Engler) Nakai 1929	Arisaema serratum
	A. sect. Sinarisaema Nakai 1950	Arisaema formosanum
	A. sect. Tenuipistillata Engl. 1920	Arisaema jacquemontii
	A. sect. Tortuosa (Engler) H. Hara 1971	Arisaema tortuosum

== Species ==
See: List of Arisaema species

Plants of the World Online accepts around 212 accepted species As of February 2025.

== Bibliography ==
- Gusman, Guy; Gusman, Liliane (2006). The genus Arisaema: A monograph for botanists and nature lovers (2nd ed.). Ruggell: A.R.G. Gantner Verlag KG. pp. 1–474. ISBN 0881928399.
- Wyatt, Robert; Stoneburner, Ann (2022). "A review of Arisaema (Araceae) in North America" (PDF). Aroideana. 45 (2): 553–583. ISSN 2310-0745.
