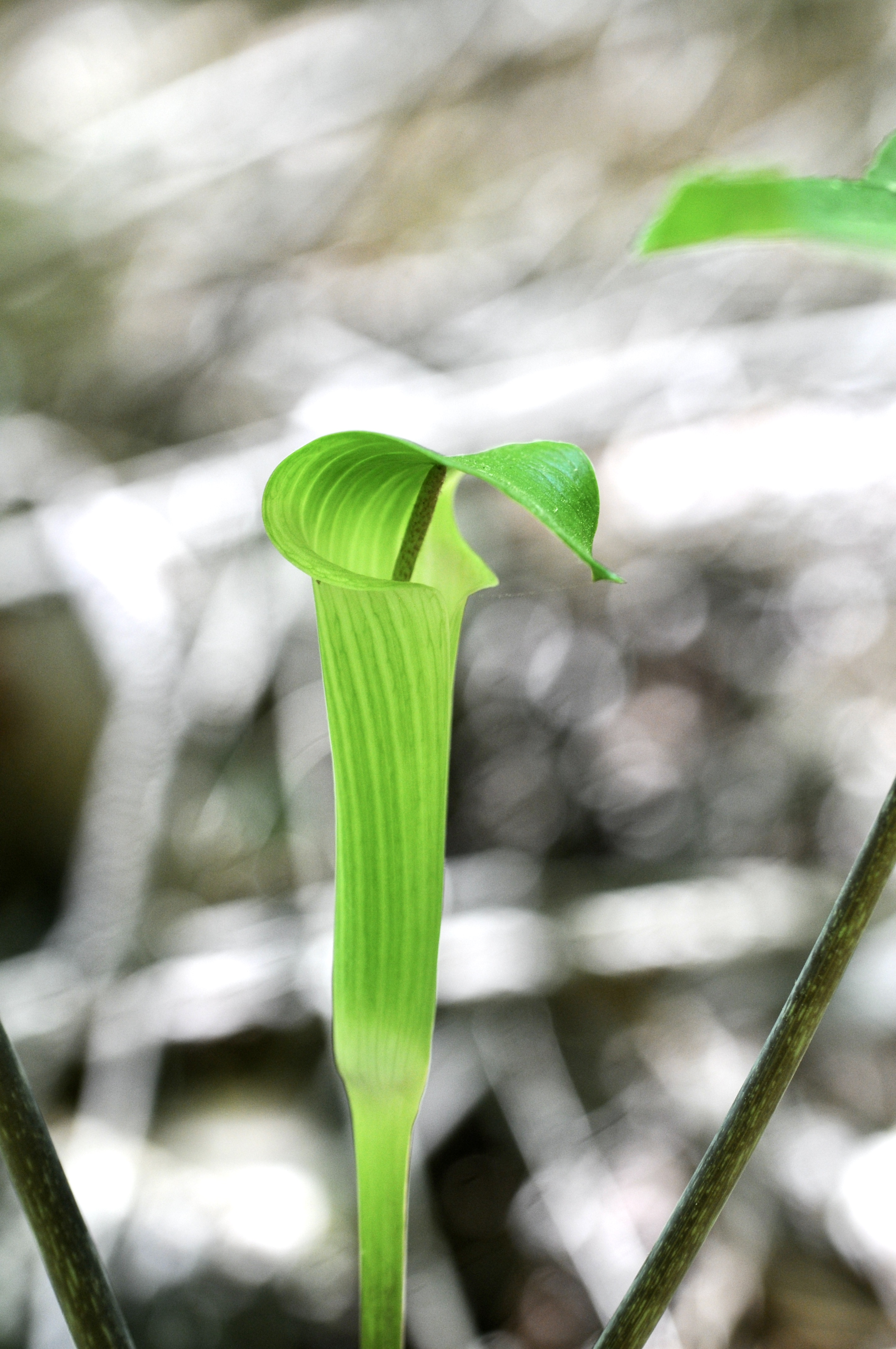

Scientific classification
- Kingdom: Plantae
- Clade: Tracheophytes
- Clade: Angiosperms
- Clade: Monocots
- Order: Alismatales
- Family: Araceae
- Genus: Arisaema
- Species: A. quinatum

Binomial name
- Arisaema quinatum (Nutt.) Schott

Synonyms
- Arisaema quinatum: Arisaema polymorphum (Buckley) Chapm.; Arum polymorphum Buckley; Arum quinatum Nutt.; Arisaema triphyllum subsp. quinatum (Nutt.) Huttl.

= Arisaema quinatum =

Species of flowering plant

Arisaema quinatum is a species of flowering plant in the arum family Araceae. It is a member of the Arisaema triphyllum complex, a group of closely related taxa in eastern North America. The specific name quinatum means "divided into five lobes", a reference to its characteristic leaves. It is commonly known as the southern Jack-in-the-pulpit (or southern Jack) but some refer to it as Preacher John.

== Description ==
Arisaema quinatum is a herbaceous, perennial, flowering plant growing from a corm. Like other members of the Arisaema triphyllum complex, it has three leaflets per leaf, but typically the lateral leaflets are two-parted or lobed, giving the appearance of five leaflets per leaf. The spathe hood is elliptic to orbicular, with an abruptly apiculate tip. Its spadix appendix is thin, cylindrical, and curved outward whereas the appendix of other members of the complex is thicker, sometimes club-shaped, and straight. The shape of the spathe hood and the curved spadix appendix make this taxon easily recognizable, usually even as a herbarium specimen.

== Taxonomy ==
Arisaema quinatum was first described as Arum quinatum by the English botanist Thomas Nuttall in 1818. Its type specimen was collected in Georgia by "Dr. Baldwyn", apparently a reference to American physician and botanist William Baldwin. The Austrian botanist Heinrich Wilhelm Schott placed Arum quinatum Nutt. in genus Arisaema in 1856. The name Arisaema quinatum (Nutt.) Schott is widely used today but Nuttall's contribution is sometimes overlooked.

Arum polymorphum was described by Samuel Botsford Buckley in 1843. Its type specimen was collected on the banks of the French Broad River in eastern Tennessee. Alvan Wentworth Chapman placed the taxon in genus Arisaema in 1860. In his description, Buckley suggested that the specimen might be Arum quinatum Nutt., but in 1981, Huttleston argued that Arisaema polymorphum (Buckley) Chapm. was of hybrid origin, with parents Arisaema quinatum and Arisaema pusillum. Today, most authorities consider Arisaema polymorphum to be a synonym for Arisaema quinatum.

Arisaema quinatum is a member of the Arisaema triphyllum complex, a group of closely related taxa that also includes Arisaema acuminatum, Arisaema pusillum, Arisaema stewardsonii, and Arisaema triphyllum. As of March 2023, some authorities consider Arisaema quinatum to be a synonym for Arisaema triphyllum or A. triphyllum subsp. quinatum. However, most authorities accept Arisaema quinatum and the other species-level members of the complex.

== Distribution and habitat ==
Arisaema quinatum is narrowly endemic to the southeastern United States, ranging from North Carolina to east Texas. It is known (but rare) as far north as West Virginia. A disjunct population occurs in the central portion of the Florida Panhandle, in Walton, Liberty, Leon, and Jefferson counties, where the species is commonly known as Prester John.

== Conservation ==
The global conservation status of Arisaema quinatum is unknown. It is uncommon (S3) in North Carolina, and rare in Florida.

== Bibliography ==
- Fernald, M. L. (July 1940). "Some spermatophytes of eastern North America, part 1". Rhodora. 42 (499): 239–276.
- Huttleston, Donald G. (1949). "The three subspecies of Arisaema triphyllum". Bulletin of the Torrey Botanical Club. 76 (6): 407–413. doi:10.2307/2482333. JSTOR 2482333.
- Huttleston, Donald G. (1981). "The four subspecies of Arisaema triphyllum". Bulletin of the Torrey Botanical Club. 108 (4): 479–481. doi:10.2307/2484449. JSTOR 2484449.
- Treiber, Miklos (1980). Biosystematics of the Arisaema triphyllum complex (PhD). Chapel Hill: University of North Carolina.
- Weakley, Alan S.; Southeastern Flora Team (2022). "Flora of the southeastern United States". University of North Carolina Herbarium, North Carolina Botanical Garden.
