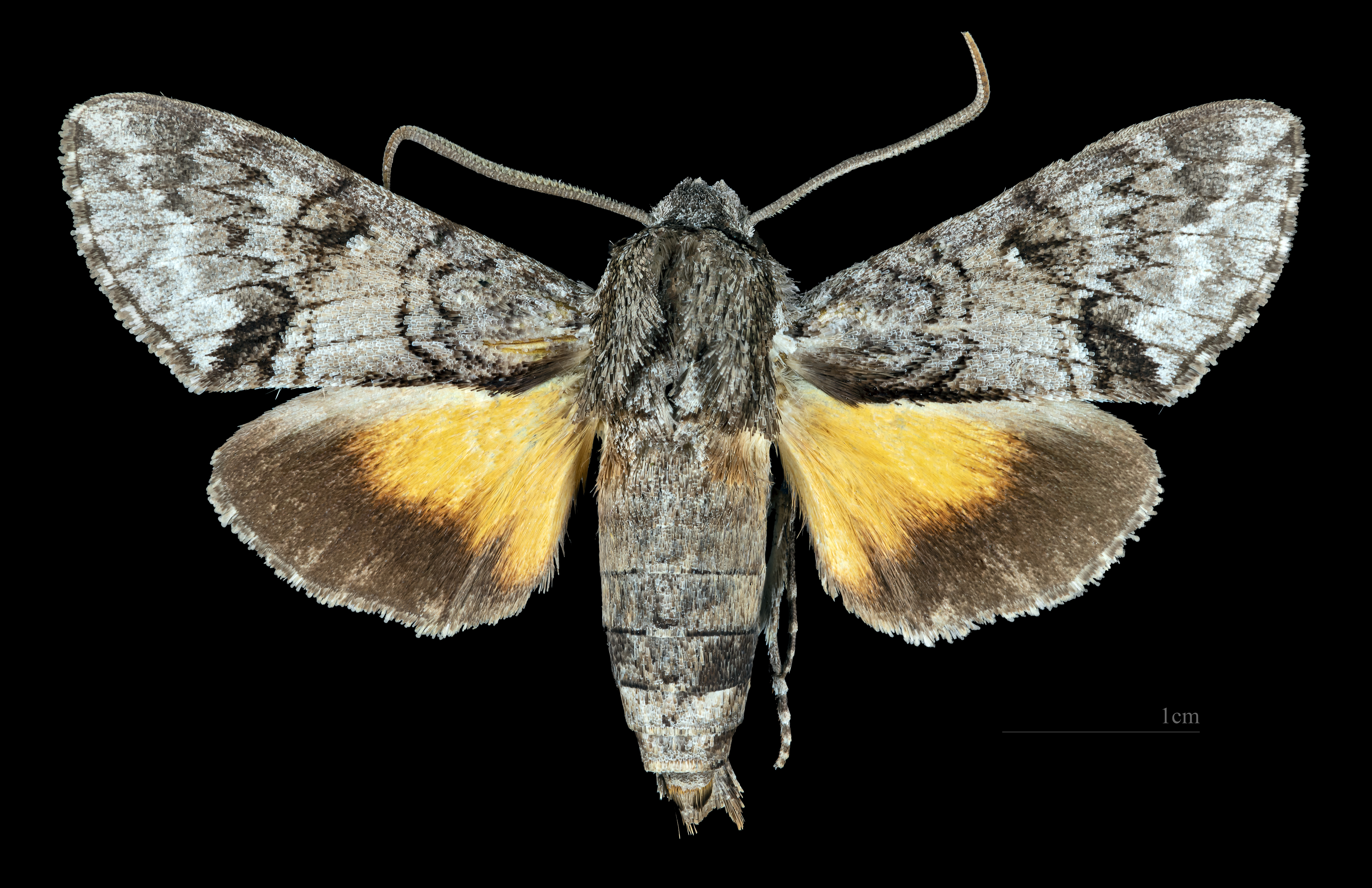
- Male dorsal
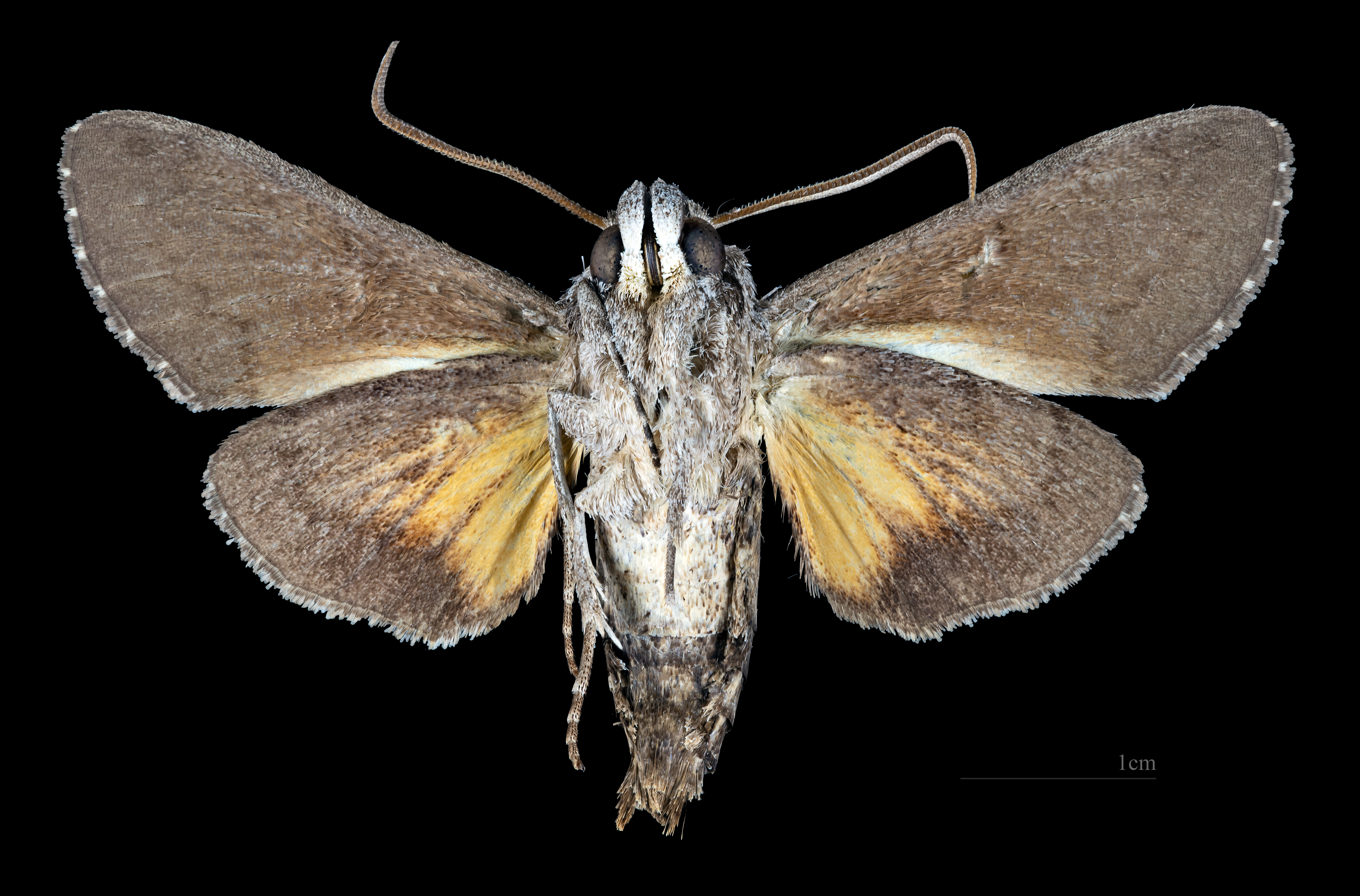
- Male ventral

Scientific classification
- Domain: Eukaryota
- Kingdom: Animalia
- Phylum: Arthropoda
- Class: Insecta
- Order: Lepidoptera
- Family: Sphingidae
- Genus: Cautethia
- Species: C. grotei

Binomial name
- Cautethia grotei H. Edwards, 1882

= Cautethia grotei =

Grote's sphinx

Species of moth

Cautethia grotei, or Grote's sphinx, is a moth of the family Sphingidae. It was described by Henry Edwards in 1882.

== Distribution ==
It resides in the US state of Florida and the islands of the Caribbean.

== Description ==
The wingspan is 28–40 mm.

== Biology ==
There are multiple generations per year in Florida. Adults nectar at various flowers, including Asystasia gangetica and Dracaena fragrans.

== Host plants ==
Larvae have been recorded feeding on various Rubiaceae species, including milkberry (Chiococca alba), black torch (Erithalis fruticosa) and common snowberry (Symphoricarpos albus).

== Subspecies ==
- Cautethia grotei grotei (Florida, Cuba, the Bahamas, Cayman Islands and possibly Hispaniola and Jamaica. Strays have been found up to Tennessee, Illinois, Pennsylvania, New York and even New Hampshire)
- Cautethia grotei apira Jordan, 1940 (Cayman Islands)
- Cautethia grotei hilaris Jordan, 1940 (Cayman Islands)
