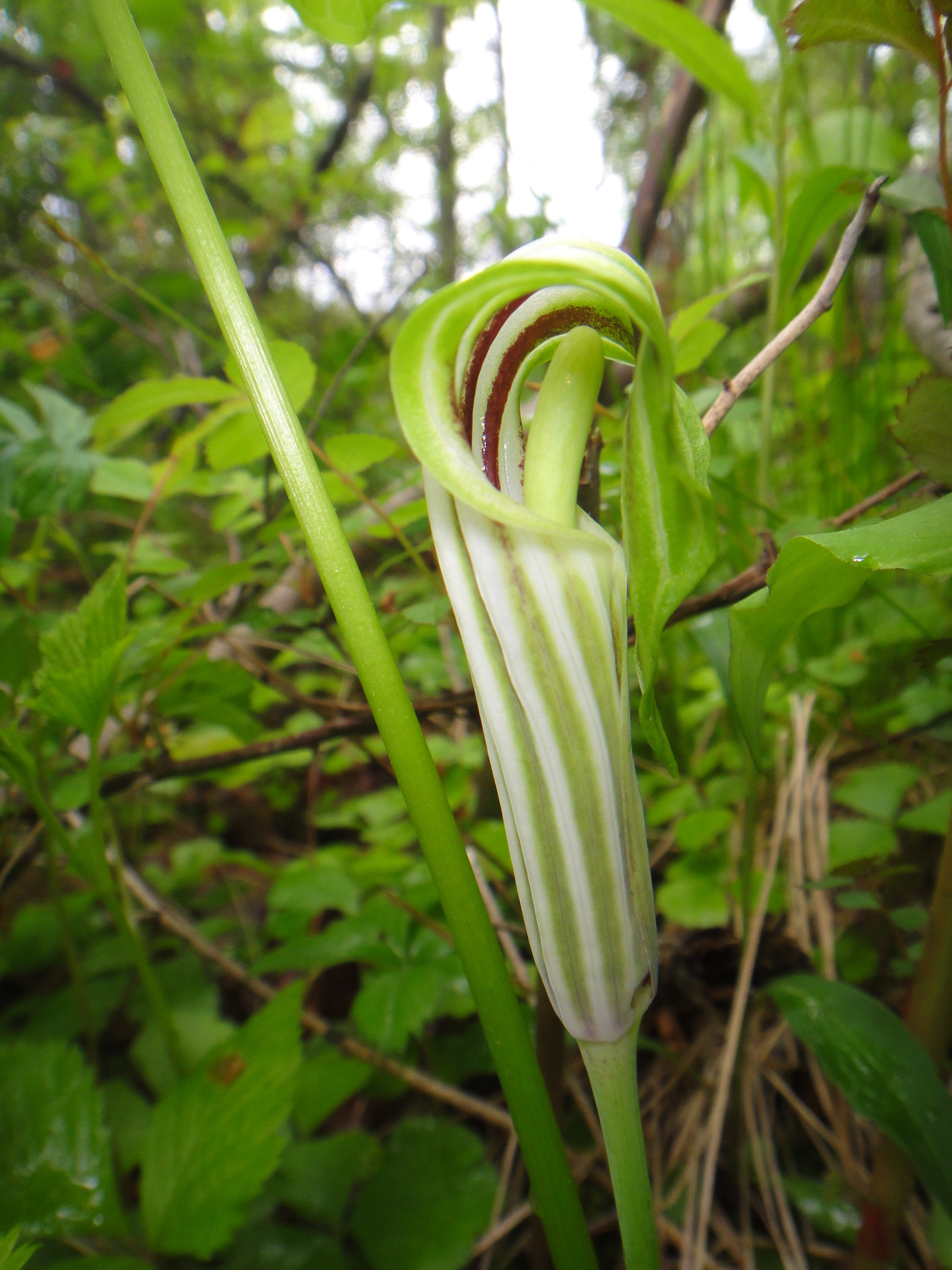

Scientific classification
- Kingdom: Plantae
- Clade: Tracheophytes
- Clade: Angiosperms
- Clade: Monocots
- Order: Alismatales
- Family: Araceae
- Genus: Arisaema
- Species: A. stewardsonii

Binomial name
- Arisaema stewardsonii Britton

Synonyms
- A. stewardsonii: Arisaema triphyllum f. stewardsonii (Britton) Engl.; Arisaema triphyllum var. stewardsonii (Britton) Stevens; Arisaema triphyllum subsp. stewardsonii (Britton) Huttl.

= Arisaema stewardsonii =

Species of flowering plant

Arisaema stewardsonii is a species of flowering plant in the arum family Araceae. It is a member of the Arisaema triphyllum complex, a group of closely related taxa in eastern North America. The specific name stewardsonii honors American botanist Stewardson Brown (1867–1921). It is commonly known as the bog Jack-in-the-pulpit (or bog Jack). It is sometimes referred to as the swamp Jack-in-the-pulpit, not to be confused with Arisaema pusillum, which is also known by that name.

== Description ==
Arisaema stewardsonii is a herbaceous, perennial, flowering plant growing from a corm. Like other members of the Arisaema triphyllum complex, it has three leaflets per leaf. Its spathe tube is strongly fluted (ridged), the only member of the complex with this distinctive character.

== Taxonomy ==
Arisaema stewardsonii was first described and named by Nathaniel Lord Britton in 1901. Earlier that year, its type specimen was collected in Tannersville, Pennsylvania by Stewardson Brown, Eugene Pintard Bicknell, and Britton. The author referred to the type as Stewardson Brown's Indian turnip.

Arisaema stewardsonii is a member of the Arisaema triphyllum complex, a group of closely related taxa that also includes Arisaema acuminatum, Arisaema pusillum, Arisaema quinatum, and Arisaema triphyllum. As of March 2023, some authorities consider Arisaema stewardsonii to be a synonym for Arisaema triphyllum or A. triphyllum subsp. stewardsonii. However, most authorities accept Arisaema stewardsonii and the other species-level members of the complex.

== Distribution and habitat ==
Arisaema stewardsonii was originally found in eastern Pennsylvania growing in wet woods among Sphagnum mosses, hence the name bog Jack-in-the-pulpit. It occurs primarily in the northeastern United States and the Maritime provinces of eastern Canada, ranging southward to the mountains in eastern Tennessee and western North Carolina, and westward to Ohio. Being the most northern taxon of the Arisaema triphyllum complex, it is sometimes called the northern Jack-in-the-pulpit.

== Conservation ==
The global conservation status of Arisaema stewardsonii is unknown. Based on the conservation status of Arisaema triphyllum subsp. stewardsonii, it may be inferred that Arisaema stewardsonii is globally secure (G5). It is uncommon (or worse) in North Carolina (S3), Ohio (S3), District of Columbia (S1S3), and New Jersey (S2).

== Bibliography ==
- Huttleston, Donald G. (1949). "The three subspecies of Arisaema triphyllum". Bulletin of the Torrey Botanical Club. 76 (6): 407–413. doi:10.2307/2482333. JSTOR 2482333.
- Huttleston, Donald G. (1981). "The four subspecies of Arisaema triphyllum". Bulletin of the Torrey Botanical Club. 108 (4): 479–481. doi:10.2307/2484449. JSTOR 2484449.
- Treiber, Miklos (1980). Biosystematics of the Arisaema triphyllum complex (PhD). Chapel Hill: University of North Carolina.
- Weakley, Alan S.; Southeastern Flora Team (2022). "Flora of the southeastern United States". University of North Carolina Herbarium, North Carolina Botanical Garden.
