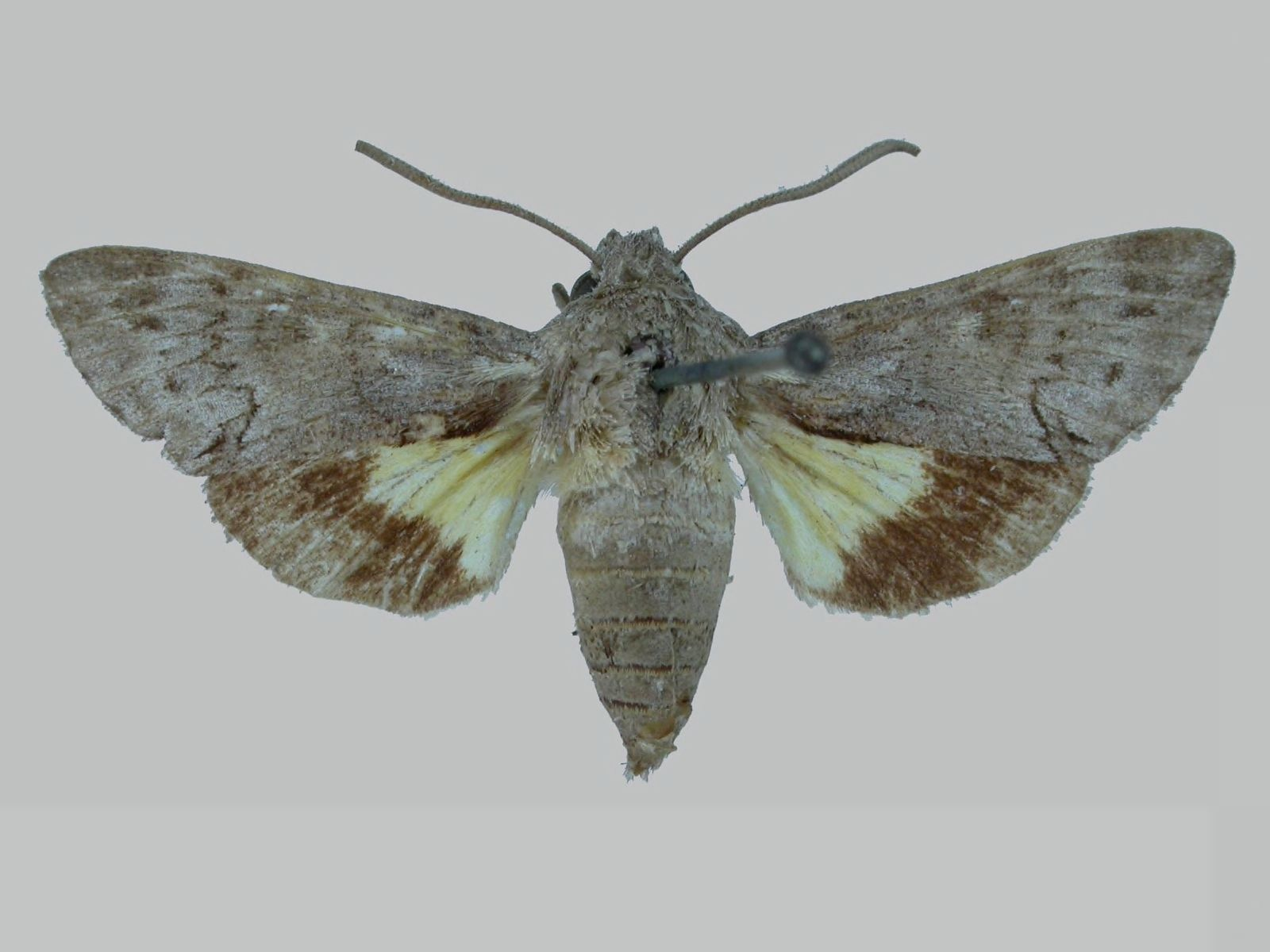
- Male

Scientific classification
- Domain: Eukaryota
- Kingdom: Animalia
- Phylum: Arthropoda
- Class: Insecta
- Order: Lepidoptera
- Family: Sphingidae
- Genus: Cautethia
- Species: C. noctuiformis

Binomial name
- Cautethia noctuiformis (Walker, 1856)

Synonyms
- Braesia hipparsus Grote & Robinson, 1868; Braessia triphoenoides Boisduval, 1875; Oenosanda noctuiformis Walker, 1856

= Cautethia noctuiformis =

Species of moth

Cautethia noctuiformis is a species of moth in the family Sphingidae, which is known from the Caribbean. It was described by Francis Walker in 1856.

The wingspan is 28–40 mm. Adults nectar at flowers.

The larvae feed on Chiococca alba in Puerto Rico and Exostema species in Cuba.

== Subspecies ==
- Cautethia noctuiformis noctuiformis (Barbuda, Antigua, Cuba, Hispaniola, Puerto-Rico, St. Thomas, St. Martin, St. Bartholomew and the Lesser Antilles)
- Cautethia noctuiformis bredini Cary, 1970 (Antigua, Barbuda and the British Virgin Islands)
- Cautethia noctuiformis choveti Haxaire, 2002 (Guadeloupe)
