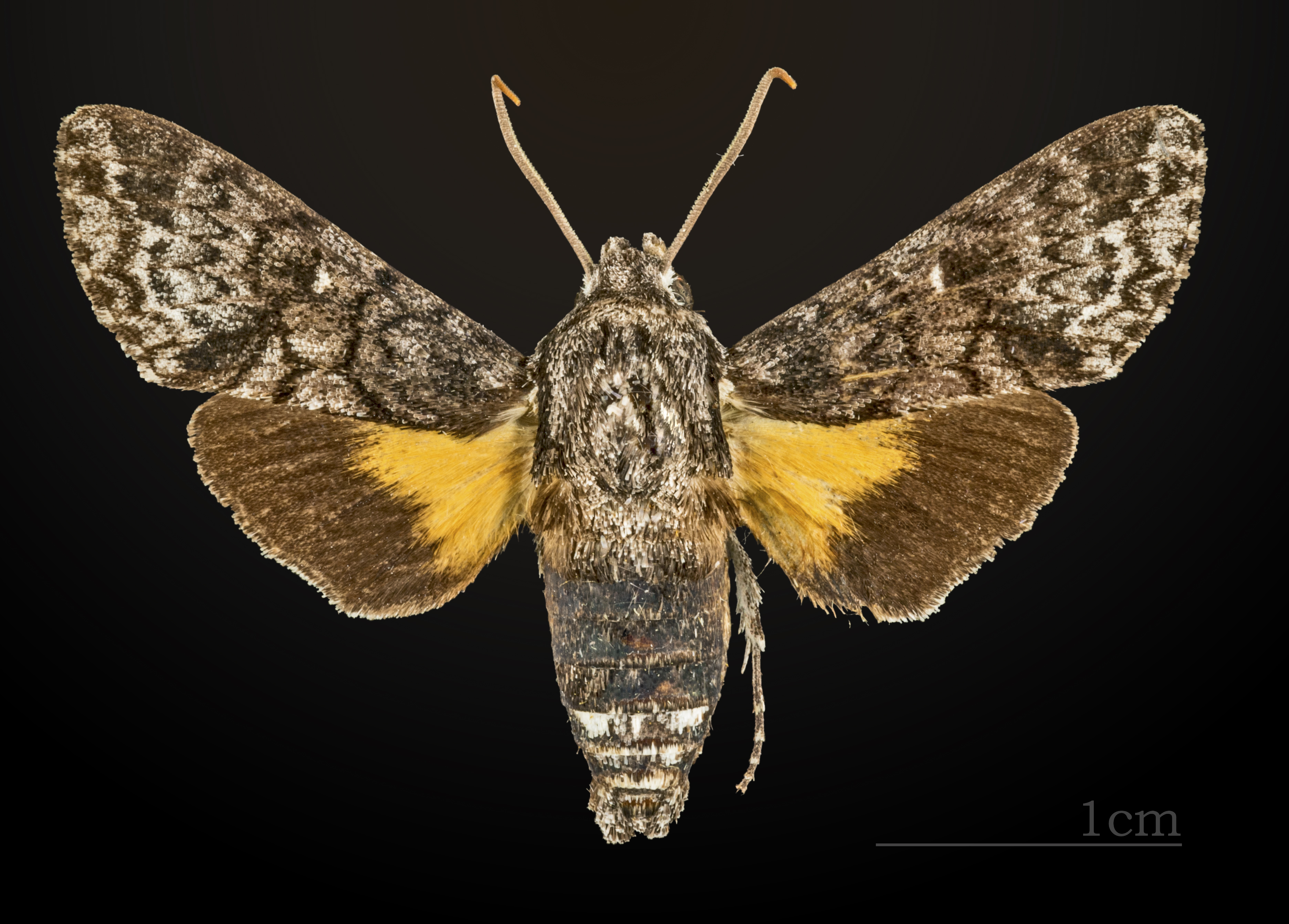
- Dorsal view
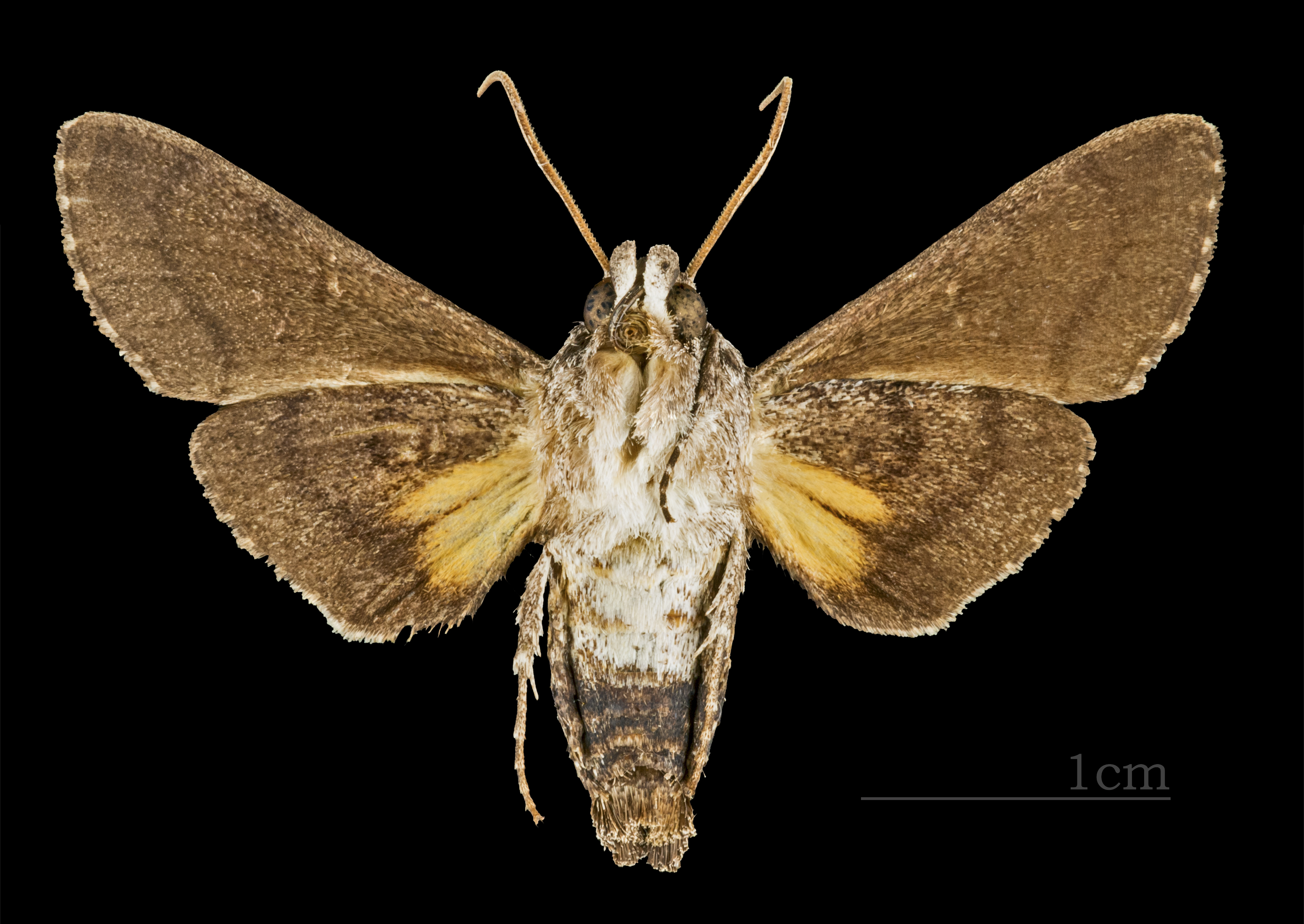
- Ventral view

Scientific classification
- Domain: Eukaryota
- Kingdom: Animalia
- Phylum: Arthropoda
- Class: Insecta
- Order: Lepidoptera
- Family: Sphingidae
- Genus: Cautethia
- Species: C. yucatana

Binomial name
- Cautethia yucatana Clark, 1919

= Cautethia yucatana =

Species of moth

Cautethia yucatana is a species of moth in the family Sphingidae, which is known from California and Mexico south to Central America. It was described by Benjamin Preston Clark in 1919.

Female moths in this species have a wingspan of 16 millimetres. It is very similar to Cautethia spuria but smaller, and the forewings are shorter and more rounded. The forewing upperside ground color is smoky gray. The tornus has a dark bar, narrowing and continuing obscurely to the midpoint of the costal margin. The basal area of the hindwing upperside is pale yellow. There is a black marginal band extending almost to the discal cell.
