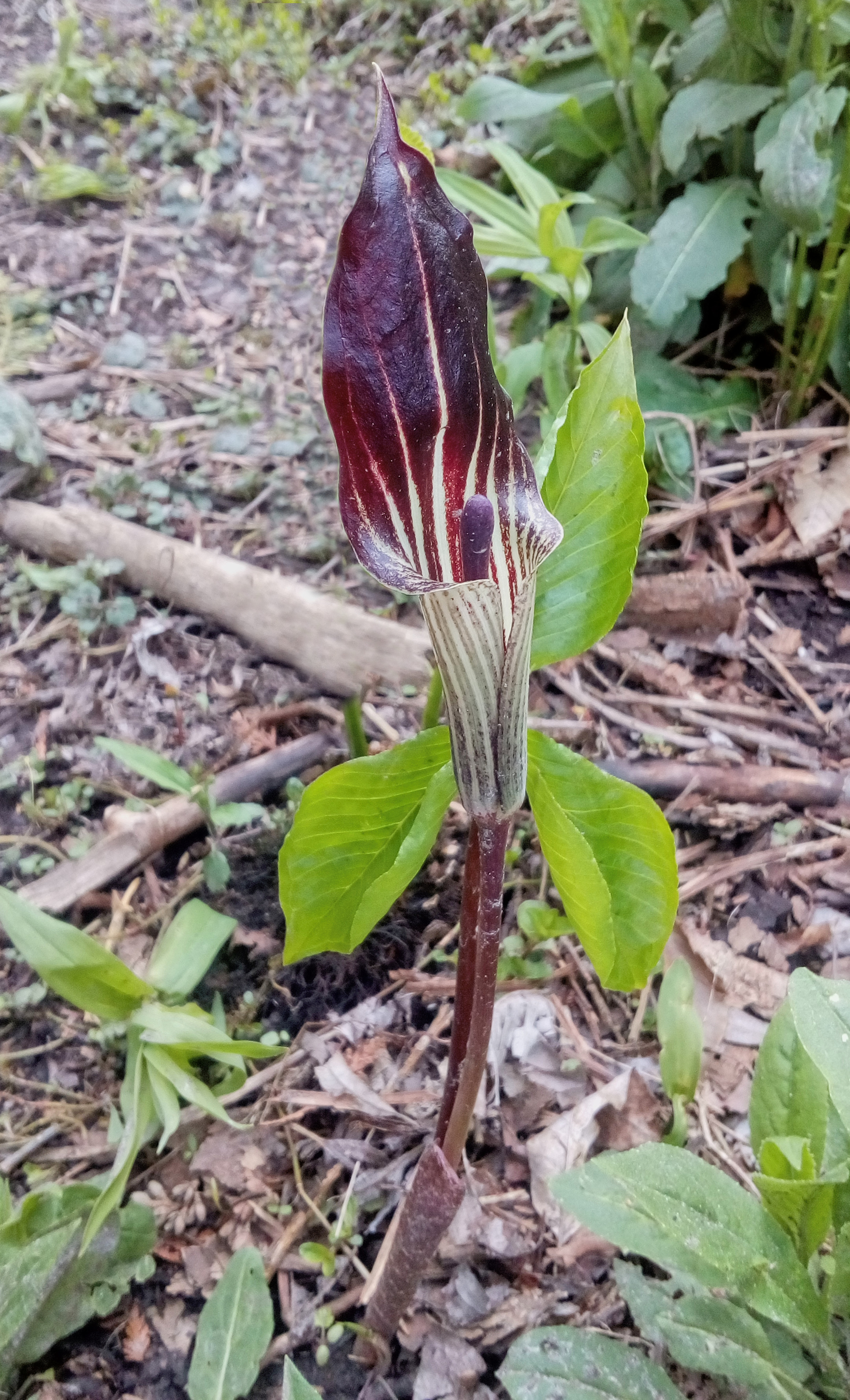

Scientific classification
- Kingdom: Plantae
- Clade: Tracheophytes
- Clade: Angiosperms
- Clade: Monocots
- Order: Alismatales
- Family: Araceae
- Genus: Arisaema
- Species: A. triphyllum

Binomial name
- Arisaema triphyllum (L.) Schott

Synonyms
- A. triphyllum s.s.: Alocasia atrorubens (Aiton) Raf.; Alocasia lobata Raf.; Alocasia triphylla (L.) Raf.; Arisaema atrorubens (Aiton) Blume; Arisaema atrorubens f. pallascens (Sims) Raymond; Arisaema atrorubens var. viride Engl.; Arisaema atrorubens f. viride (Engl.) Fernald; Arisaema atrorubens f. zebrinum (Sims) Fernald; Arisaema atrorubens var. zebrinum (Sims) Raymond; Arisaema brasilianum Blume; Arisaema deflexum Nieuwl. & K.Just; Arisaema hastatum Blume; Arisaema quinatum var. obtusoquinatum Alph.Wood; Arisaema triphyllum lusus bispadiceum Engl.; Arisaema triphyllum lusus bispathaceum Engl.; Arisaema triphyllum var. montanum Fernald; Arisaema triphyllum lusus trispadiceum Engl.; Arisaema triphyllum var. typicum Engl.; Arisaema triphyllum var. viride (Engl.) Engl.; Arisaema triphyllum f. viride (Engl.) Farw.; Arisaema triphyllum f. zebrinum (Sims) F.Seym.; Arisaema zebrinum G.Nicholson; Arum atrorubens Aiton; Arum triphyllum L.; Arum triphyllum var. atropurpureum Michx.; Arum triphyllum var. atrorubens (Aiton) Dewey ex Alph.Wood; Arum triphyllum var. pallescens Sims; Arum triphyllum var. virens Michx.; Arum triphyllum var. viride Sims; Arum triphyllum var. zebrinum Sims; Arum vittatum Salisb.

= Arisaema triphyllum =

Species of flowering plant

Arisaema triphyllum, the Jack-in-the-pulpit, is a species of flowering plant in the arum family Araceae. It is a member of the Arisaema triphyllum complex, a group of four or five closely related taxa in eastern North America. The specific name triphyllum means "three-leaved", a characteristic feature of the species, which is also referred to as Indian turnip, bog onion, and brown dragon.

Used without qualification, the name Arisaema triphyllum is ambiguous. For clarity, the qualified name Arisaema triphyllum sensu stricto (abbreviated s.s.) refers to the species while Arisaema triphyllum sensu lato refers to the species complex. The latter includes the species (Arisaema triphyllum) among its members.

Arisaema triphyllum sensu lato is wide-ranging across eastern North America, from Nova Scotia to Manitoba in eastern Canada, and from Texas to Florida in the southern United States. It is common throughout most of its range.

== Description ==
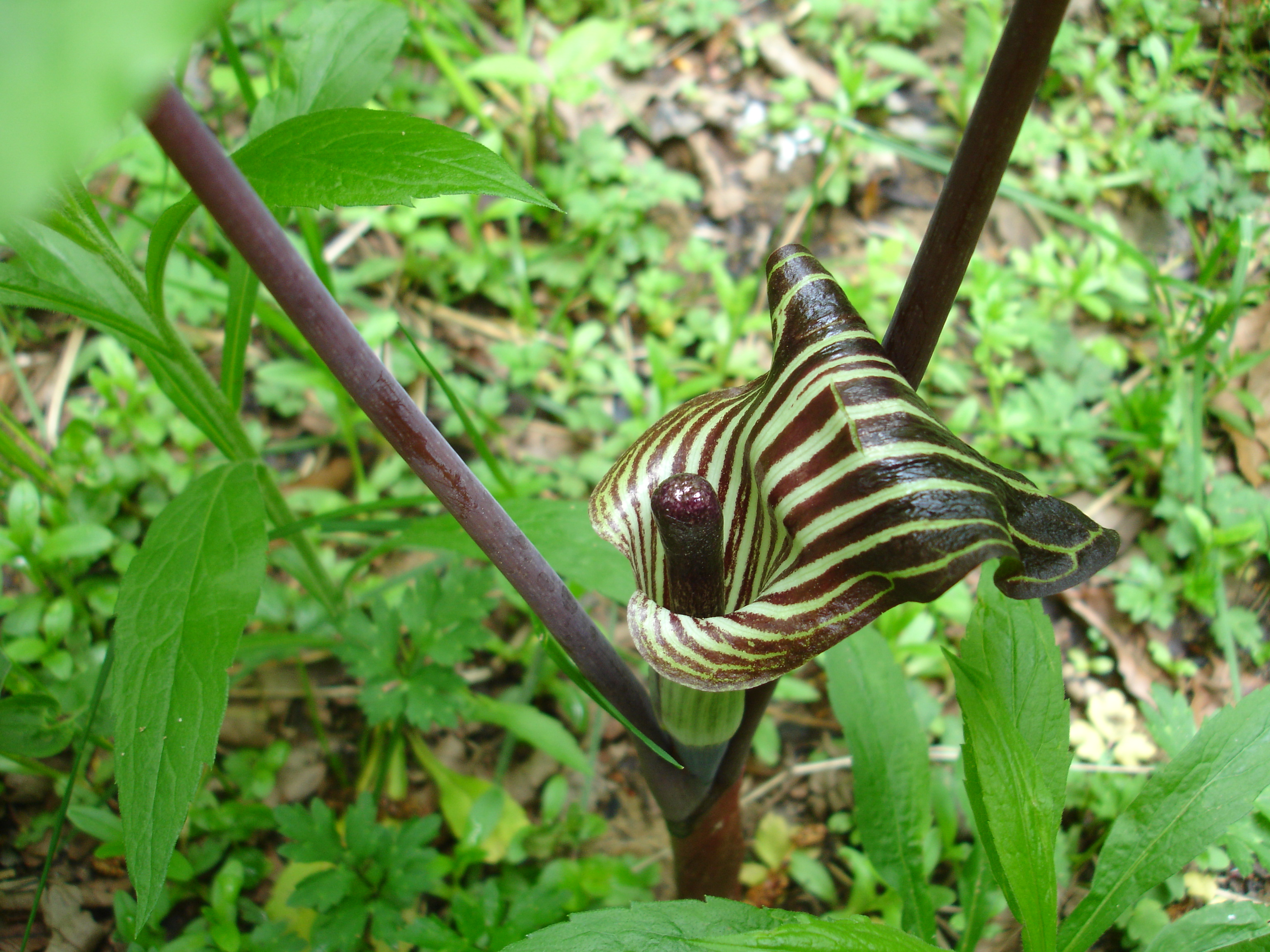
Plant in the Allegheny National Forest, Pennsylvania, USA

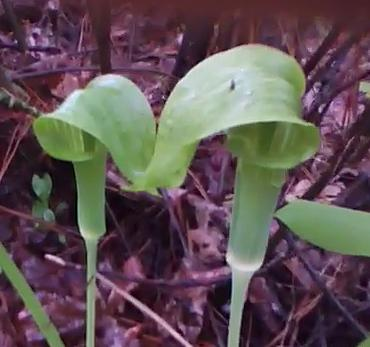

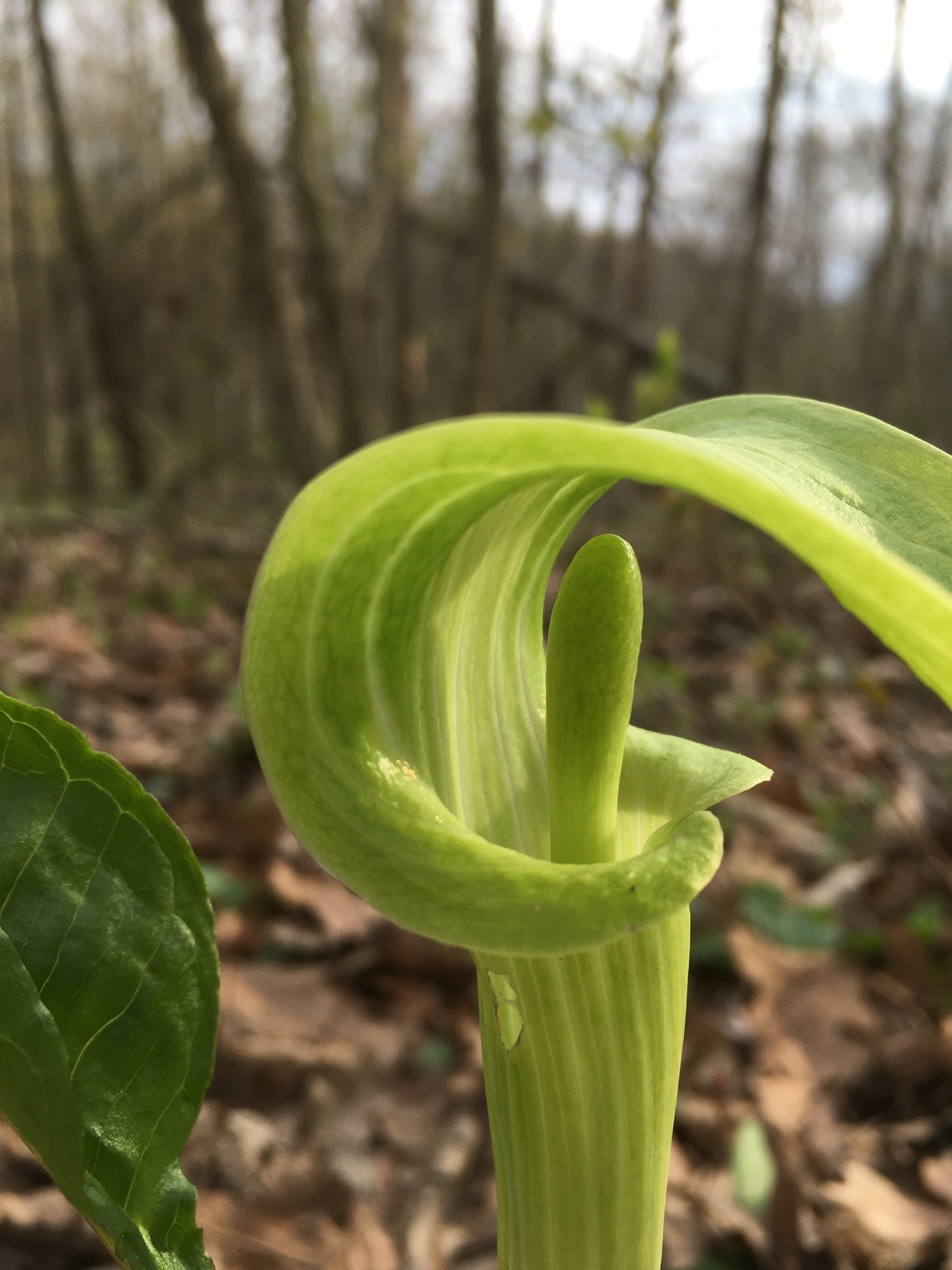
Closer view of flower, showing detail of spathe

The Arisaema triphyllum complex includes four closely related species: Arisaema pusillum, Arisaema stewardsonii, Arisaema quinatum, and Arisaema triphyllum sensu stricto. A fifth species (Arisaema acuminatum) is sometimes included but its validity is controversial.

Arisaema triphyllum sensu lato is a herbaceous, perennial, flowering plant growing from a corm. It typically grows up to two feet (61 cm) tall, but populations in Georgia and Florida are known to reach almost twice that height. It has 1 or 2 leaves, each with three leaflets (triphyllum). Occasionally the lateral leaflets will be two-parted or lobed, giving the appearance of five leaflets per leaf. One species (A. quinatum) typically has five pseudo-leaflets per leaf.

The small, inconspicuous flowers of Jack-in-the-pulpit are borne on a fleshy, spike-like inflorescence called a spadix ("Jack"), which is enclosed (or nearly enclosed) by a large, sometimes colorful bract called a spathe ("pulpit"). The flowers are clustered around the base of the spadix inside the spathe. A sterile spadix appendix protrudes from the mouth of the spathe tube. The appendix is covered by the leafy tip of the spathe, referred to as the spathe hood (or spathe lamina). The lip along the mouth of the spathe tube, used as a landing platform for winged insects, is called the spathe flange.

The inflorescence can be male (with male flowers only), bisexual (with both male and female flowers), or female (with female flowers only). Arisaema is quite unusual in that individuals change sex in a pattern determined by their size. In a small plant, most if not all of the flowers are male. As the plant matures and grows larger, the spadix produces female flowers as well as male flowers. The transition from male to female continues until eventually the plant produces female flowers only. This is an example of dichogamy, a rare phenomenon in flowering plants. Due to this sex-change lifecycle, this species is sometimes called colloquially as Jack or Jill in the pulpit or Jill-in-the-pulpit.

The unripe fruits are smooth, shiny green berries (each 1 cm wide) clustered around the thickened spadix. Fruits ripen in the late summer and early fall, turning a conspicuous bright red color. Each berry typically produces 1–5 seeds, which are white to light tan, rounded, often with flattened edges and a short sharp point at the top. If the seeds are freed from the berry, they will germinate the next spring, producing seedlings each with a single rounded leaf. A seedling needs three or more years of growth before it becomes mature enough to flower.

Arisaema pusillum, Arisaema stewardsonii, and Arisaema quinatum are diploid with 28 chromosomes. Arisaema triphyllum s.s. is predominantly tetraploid with 56 chromosomes but plants otherwise indistinguishable from typical A. triphyllum occasionally have 28 chromosomes. Two such plants were found in Cayuga County, New York in the 1940s. The evolutionary origin of the tetraploid is unknown.

=== Identification ===
The following table of characteristics serves to separate the members of the Arisaema triphyllum complex:

	Arisaema triphyllum s.s.	Arisaema pusillum	Arisaema stewardsonii	Arisaema quinatum
Leaflets, abaxial	Glaucous	Light green, glossy	Light green, glossy	Glaucous
Leaflets, lateral	Very gibbous or lobed	Slightly or moderately gibbous (lobed)	Slightly gibbous	Two-parted or lobed or very gibbous
Spathe tube	Smooth to slightly fluted	Smooth to slightly fluted	**Strongly fluted**	Smooth
Spathe hood shape	Broad lanceolate to ovate, tip acute or acuminate	Lanceolate to ovate, tip acuminate	Ovate, tip acute	Oval to orbicular, tip abruptly apiculate
Spathe hood color, adaxial	Green with purple stripes or wholly green	Wholly purple or wholly green, rarely purple with fine green stripes	Green with purple stripes in the throat	Green
Spathe flange	Flat or slightly revolute, 4.5–7 mm wide	Revolute, 1–3 mm wide	Revolute, 1–3 mm wide	2–5 mm broad, flaring
Spadix appendix	Clavate (shaped like a club), straight, 4–10 mm in diameter	Cylindric (shaped like a cylinder), straight, 2–5 mm in diameter	Cylindric, straight, 2–5 mm in diameter	Cylindric, **curved outward**, 1–2 mm in diameter
Somatic chromosome number	56 (28)	28	28	28
Habitat	Mesic (moist) deciduous woodlands	Hydric (wet) deciduous woodlands, swamps, wetlands	Hydric deciduous woodlands, bogs, swamps, wetlands	Mesic deciduous woodlands
Range	Wide-ranging across eastern North America	Primarily southeastern U.S.	Primarily northeastern U.S. and southeastern Canada	Endemic to southeastern U.S.

In the body of the table above, important diagnostic characters are emphasized in bold. To identify an individual to species, ask the following questions (in order):

1. Is it Arisaema stewardsonii? (Does it have a strongly fluted spathe tube?) If not, continue.
2. Is it Arisaema quinatum? (Does it have a curved spadix appendix?) If not, continue.
3. Is it Arisaema pusillum? (Check for multiple matching characters.) Otherwise it is Arisaema triphyllum s.s.

Although the taxa are morphologically distinct, identification may be difficult, especially from herbarium specimens where the required characters are often lost in pressing and drying.

Non-flowering plants are sometimes confused with those of Pinellia, a genus of plants native to East Asia but introduced to a handful of states in the eastern U.S., including the District of Columbia, Maryland, New York, Pennsylvania, and West Virginia.

== Taxonomy ==
Arisaema triphyllum sensu stricto was first described as Arum triphyllum by the Swedish botanist Carl Linnaeus in the first edition of Species Plantarum in 1753. Linnaeus expanded the description of the taxon in the second edition published in 1763. The Austrian botanist Heinrich Wilhelm Schott placed Arum triphyllum L. in the genus Arisaema in 1832. The name Arisaema triphyllum (L.) Schott is widely used today despite a taxonomic disruption that prevailed during the second half of the twentieth century.

By 1903, four additional species of Arisaema in eastern North America had been described: Arisaema acuminatum Small, Arisaema pusillum (Peck) Nash, Arisaema quinatum (Nutt.) Schott, and Arisaema stewardsonii Britton. In 1940, Merritt Lyndon Fernald posed the question "What is Arisaema triphyllum?", arguing that the type described by Linnaeus was in fact Arisaema pusillum, a claim that destabilized the existing nomenclature. In response, a proposal to conserve the name and type of Arum triphyllum L. was briefly considered, but in 1993 the Committee for Spermatophyta recommended against the proposal, which effectively established the name Arisaema triphyllum (L.) Schott as the official name of the entity. However, the committee's action left botanists with an inherently unstable nomenclature.

Dismissing Fernald's claim as inconclusive, Donald Grunert Huttleston introduced three subspecies of Arisaema triphyllum in 1949, and a fourth subspecies in 1981. He discussed but rejected a fifth taxon believed to be of hybrid origin. Together with their basionyms and other synonyms, these five taxa are sometimes referred to as the Arisaema triphyllum complex:

Species	Subspecies	Varieties
Arisaema acuminatum Small		Arisaema triphyllum var. acuminatum (Small) Engl.
Arisaema pusillum (Peck) Nash	Arisaema triphyllum subsp. pusillum (Peck) Huttl.	Arisaema triphyllum var. pusillum Peck
Arisaema quinatum (Nutt.) Schott; Basionym: Arum quinatum Nutt.	Arisaema triphyllum subsp. quinatum (Nutt.) Huttl.	
Arisaema stewardsonii Britton	Arisaema triphyllum subsp. stewardsonii (Britton) Huttl.	Arisaema triphyllum var. stewardsonii (Britton) Stevens
Arisaema triphyllum (L.) Schott; Basionym: Arum triphyllum L.	Arisaema triphyllum subsp. triphyllum	Arisaema triphyllum var. triphyllum

As of March 2023, all five taxa are recognized. Some authorities accept subspecies, while a few accept varieties. Plants of the World Online and others accept multiple species in lieu of subspecies or varieties. Still others, including the influential Flora of North America, lump all of the taxa into a single species concept.

Within the genus Arisaema, A. triphyllum is classified in the section Pedatisecta and is most closely related to Asian species such as A. amurense. It is not a close relative to the other American Arisaema species (A. dracontium and A. macrospathum), which are in a different section of Arisaema.

== Distribution and habitat ==
Arisaema triphyllum sensu lato is wide-ranging across eastern North America, from Nova Scotia in the northeast to Florida in the southeast, stretching westward across the Mississippi River valley into the Great Plains, from Texas in the southwest to Manitoba in the northwest. It is common throughout most of its range, occurring in most counties in over 30 states in the eastern U.S.

Less is known about the distribution of Arisaema triphyllum sensu stricto. Based on records of Arisaema triphyllum subsp. triphyllum, it may be inferred that the former is likewise wide-ranging, with known occurrences across 6 provinces and 37 states plus the District of Columbia. In the southeastern United States, it is common as far south as the Florida panhandle.

A. triphyllum occurs in mesic, shaded forests.

== Ecology ==
Arisaema triphyllum sensu lato flowers from April to June. Arisaema triphyllum sensu stricto is the first to flower in the spring. In regions where the species are sympatric, Arisaema stewardsonii and Arisaema pusillum begin to flower 1–2 and 2–3 weeks later, respectively. Since an individual flowering period can last 1–3 weeks or more, it is not unusual to find all three species in flower at the same time. In the southeastern United States, Arisaema quinatum is reported to flower later than either A. pusillum or A. triphyllum s.s.

Arisaema triphyllum sensu lato is pollinated by fungus gnats, which it attracts by smell and are trapped by the flower. They manage to escape from a hole at the bottom of the male's pulpit, but cannot do so when they fall inside a female pulpit, which do not have exit holes. Thus the Jill-in-the-pulpit is a rare femme fatale in the plant world: luring the gnats in with scent, but ultimately killing the pollinators in a death trap.

Other insects are known to visit the flowers as well, such as gall gnats and beetles. The plant is not self-pollinating since the male flowers on a specific plant have already matured and died before the female flowers of that same plant are mature. So the female flowers need to be pollinated by the male flowers of a different plant. This inhibits inbreeding and contributes to the health of the species.

Arisaema pusillum, Arisaema stewardsonii, and Arisaema triphyllum sensu stricto are reproductively isolated in the wild, with some degree of ecological separation. However, a population intermediate between Arisaema stewardsonii and Arisaema triphyllum s.s. is known to occur near Clyde, New York. Individuals from this population have glaucous leaves (like A. triphyllum) and strongly fluted spathes (like A. stewardsonii), growing in dry sandy soil (like neither species). Chromosome counts were performed on six of these plants. Four were found to be diploid with 28 chromosomes (like A. stewardsonii) while two were triploid with 42 chromosomes (intermediate).

== Conservation ==
The conservation status of Arisaema triphyllum sensu lato is globally secure (G5). Based on the conservation status of Arisaema triphyllum subsp. triphyllum, it may be inferred that Arisaema triphyllum sensu stricto is globally secure as well. Arisaema triphyllum is imperiled at best (S1S2) in Manitoba.

== Toxicity ==
The oxalic acid in jack-in-the-pulpit is poisonous if ingested. The plant contains calcium oxalate crystals as raphides in all parts, and because of this, consumption of the raw plant material results in a powerful burning sensation. It can cause irritation of the mouth and digestive system and (on rare occasions) intense swelling of the mouth and throat, potentially being severe enough to affect breathing. Arisaemas are in the same plant family as the anthuriums, aglaonemas, alocasias, colocasias, dieffenbachias, monsteras and philodendrons (among numerous others)— all known as "dumb-canes"—and carry the shared side-effect of an inflamed upper respiratory/digestive system upon ingestion.

== Uses ==
If the plant is cooked it can be eaten as a root vegetable. The calcium oxalate crystals produce a peppery flavor. If the plant is sliced then dried it can be eaten like potato chips or ground into a flour.

A preparation of the root was reported to have been used by Native Americans as a treatment for sore eyes. Preparations were also made to treat rheumatism, bronchitis, and snakebites, as well as to induce sterility.

One account from the Meskwaki people states that they would chop the herb's corm and mix it with meat and leave the meat out for their enemies to find. The taste of the oxalate would not be detectable because of the flavored meat, but consuming the meat reportedly caused their enemies pain and death. They have also reportedly used it to determine the fate of the sick by dropping a seed in a cup of stirred water; If the seed went around four times clockwise, the patient would recover, if it went around less than four times they would not.

It is hardy to USDA plant hardiness zone 3.

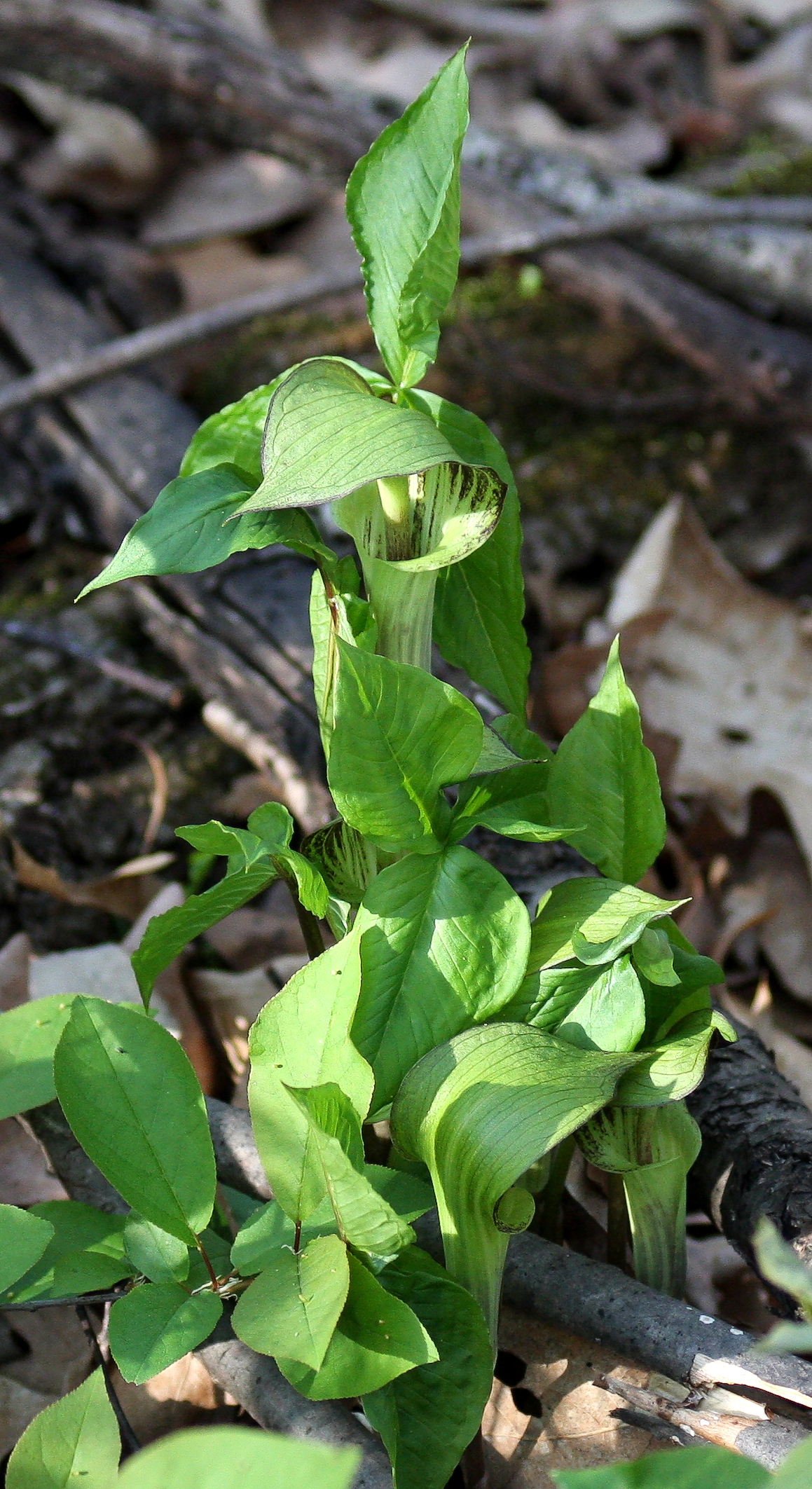
Plants in early spring before the leaves have fully unfolded

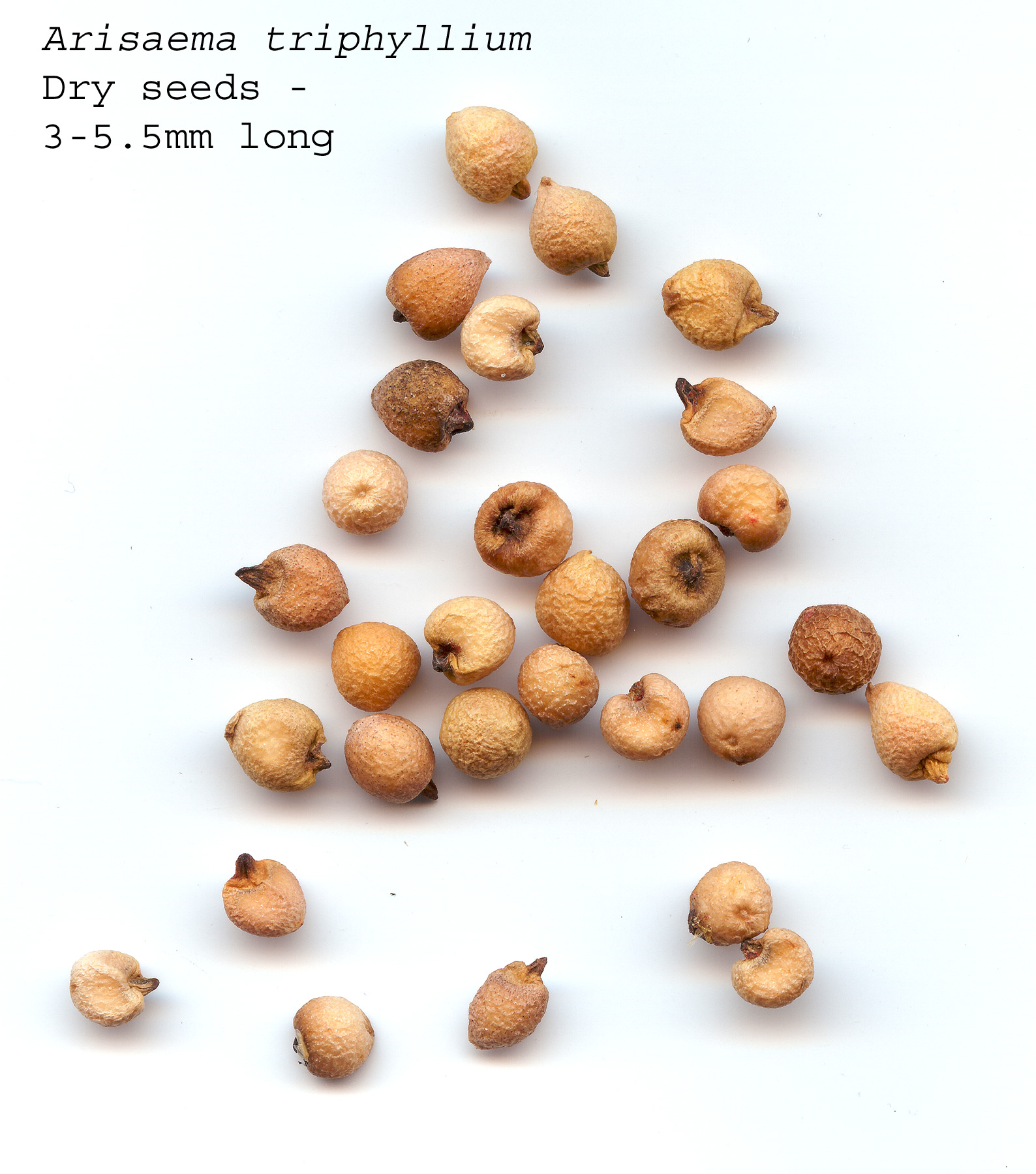
Seeds

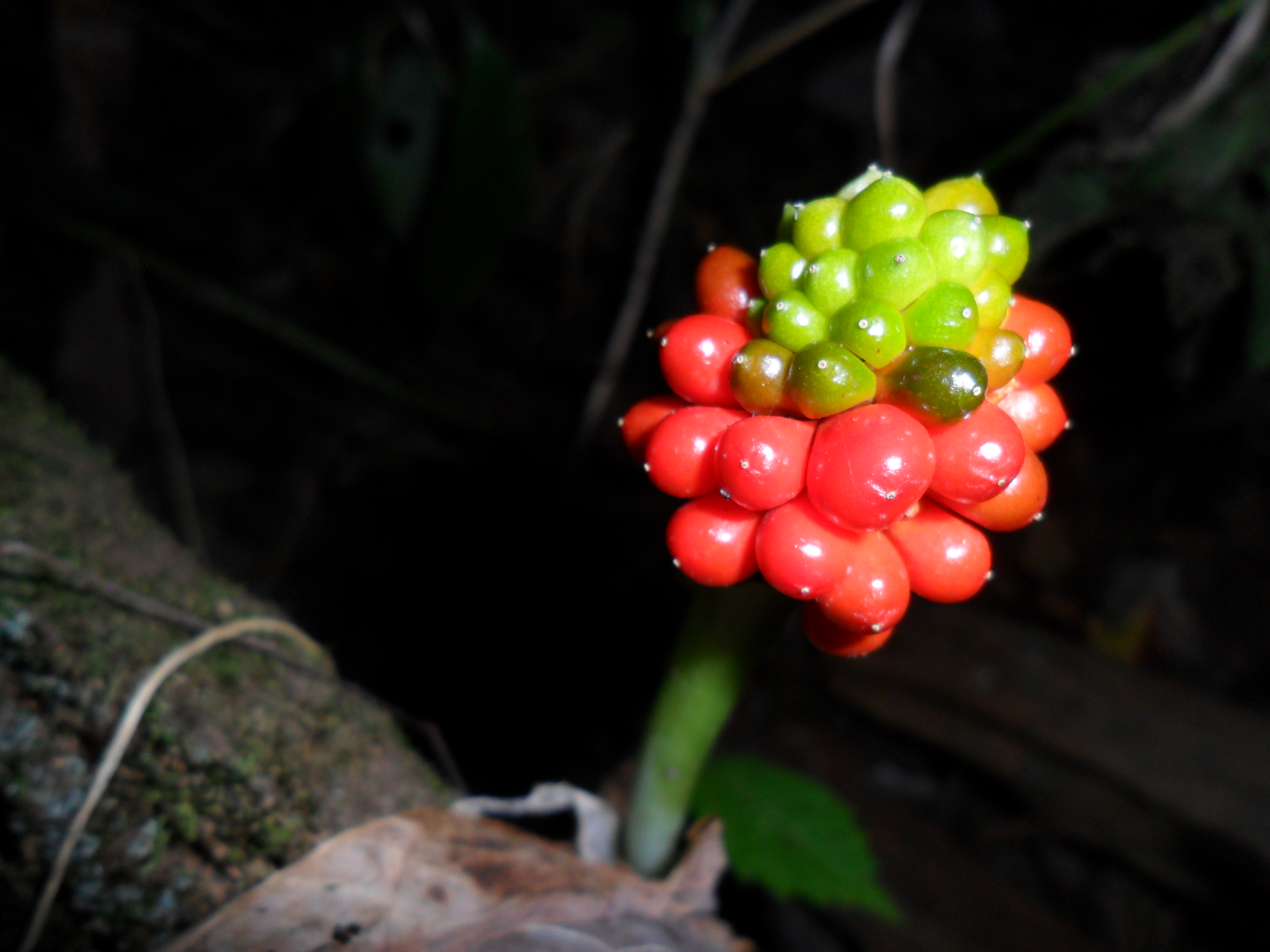
Berries

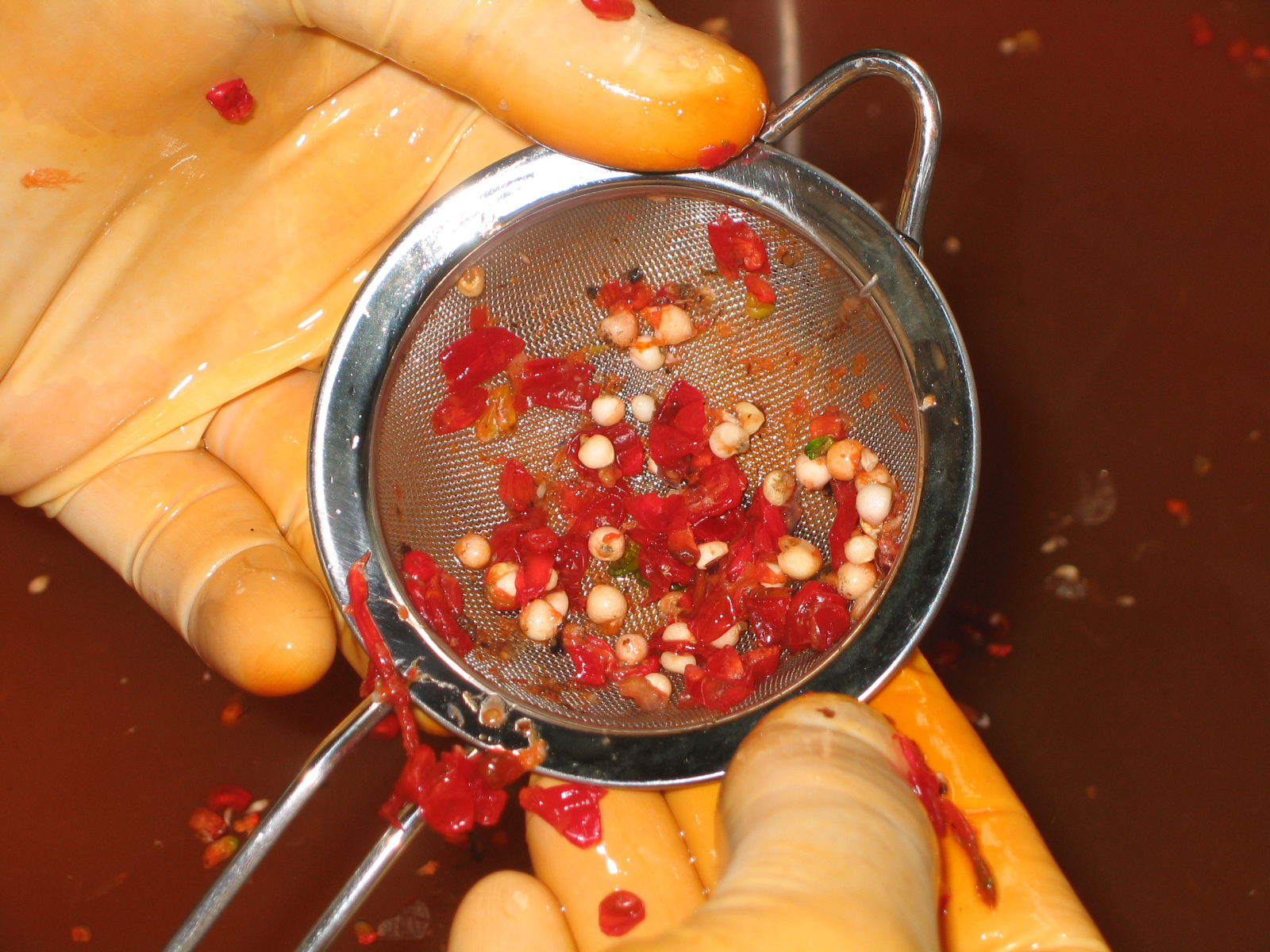
Gloved hands cleaning seeds from pulp

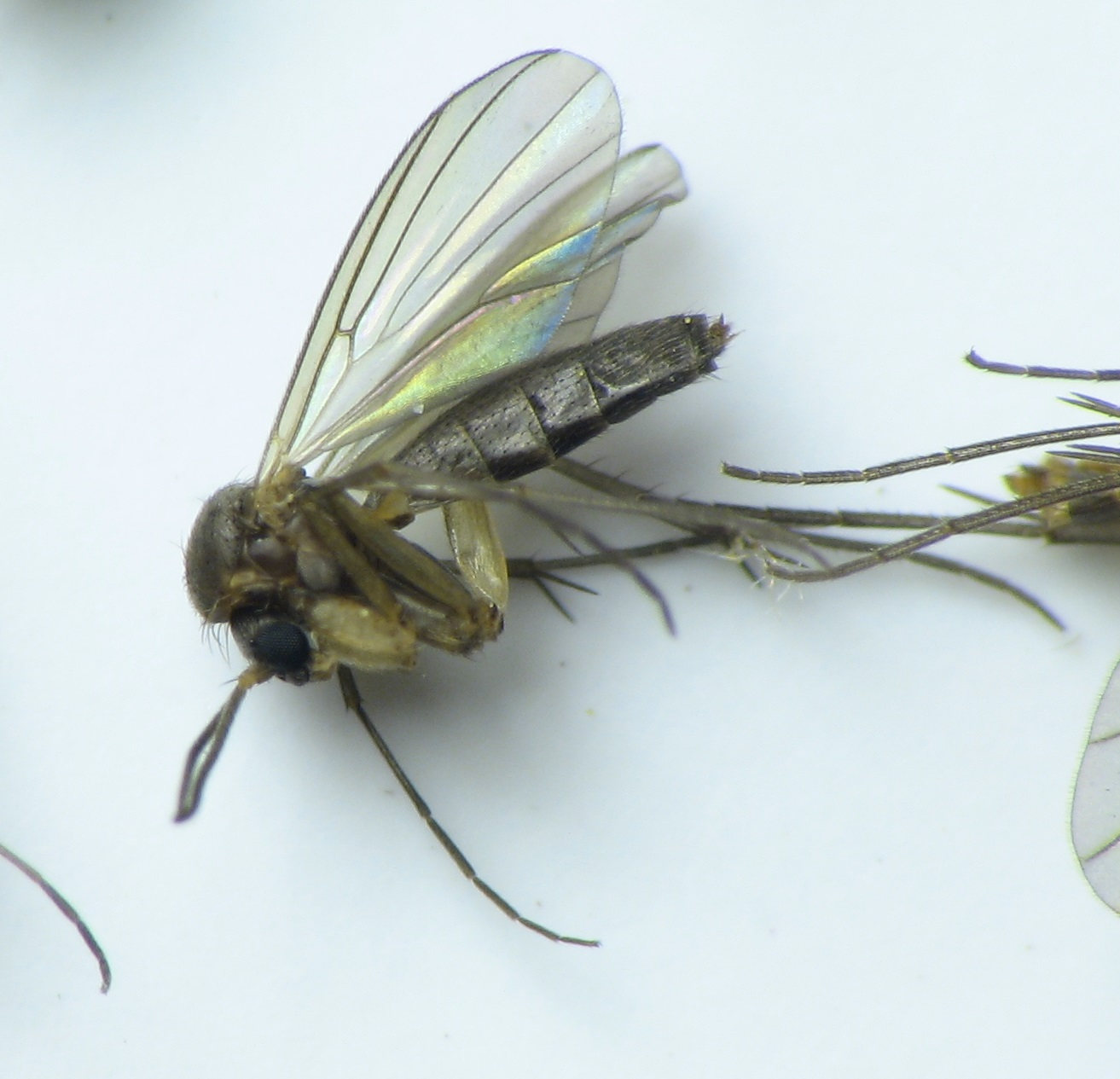
Mycetophilid gnat Phronia found dead inside female inflorescence

== Bibliography ==
- Fernald, M. L. (July 1940). "Some spermatophytes of eastern North America, part 1". Rhodora. 42 (499): 239–276.
- Huttleston, Donald G. (1949). "The three subspecies of Arisaema triphyllum". Bulletin of the Torrey Botanical Club. 76 (6): 407–413. doi:10.2307/2482333. JSTOR 2482333.
- Huttleston, Donald G. (1981). "The four subspecies of Arisaema triphyllum". Bulletin of the Torrey Botanical Club. 108 (4): 479–481. doi:10.2307/2484449. JSTOR 2484449.
- Treiber, Miklos (1980). Biosystematics of the Arisaema triphyllum complex (PhD). Chapel Hill: University of North Carolina.
- Weakley, Alan S.; Southeastern Flora Team (2022). "Flora of the southeastern United States". University of North Carolina Herbarium, North Carolina Botanical Garden.
