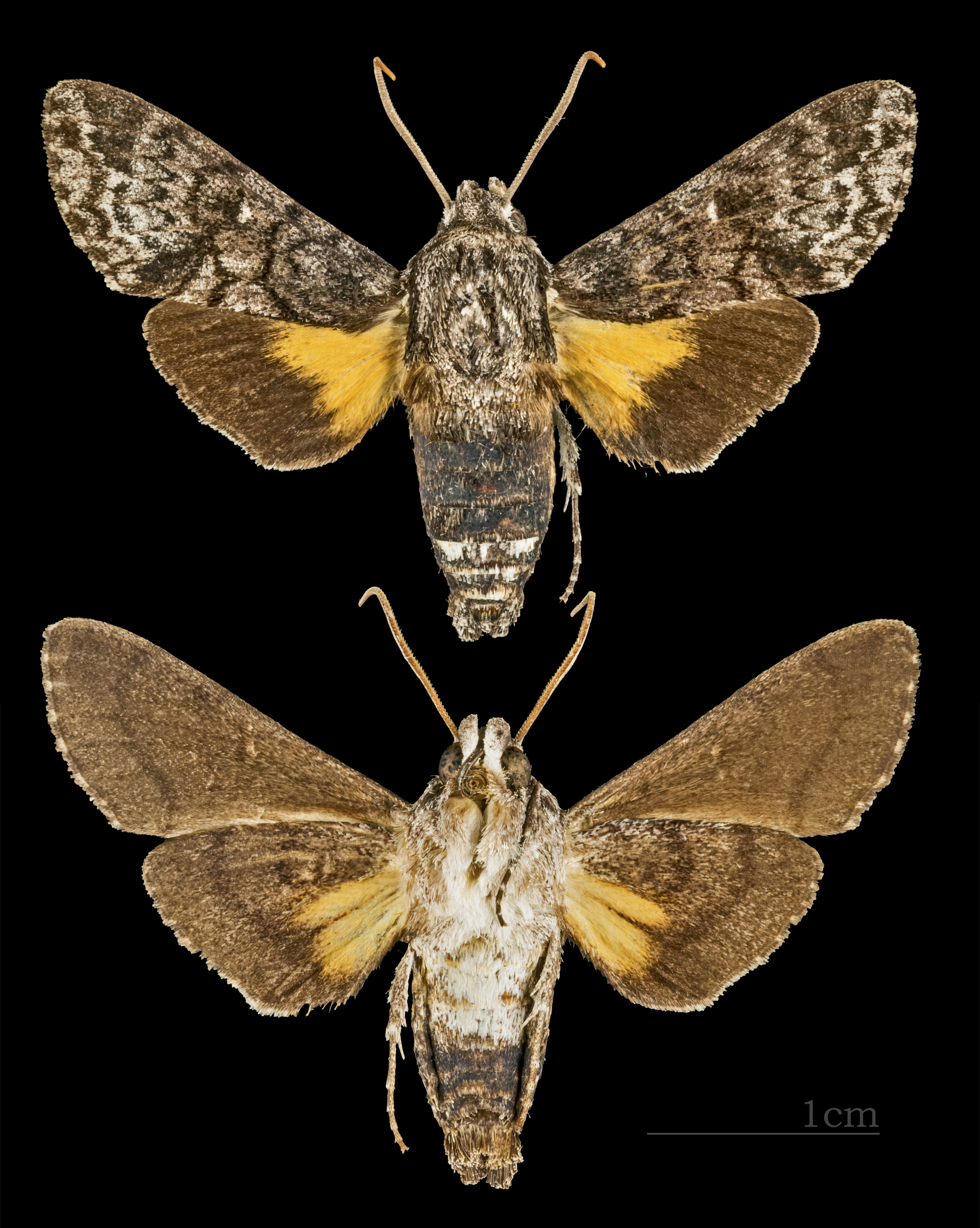
- Cautethia yucatana

Scientific classification
- Domain: Eukaryota
- Kingdom: Animalia
- Phylum: Arthropoda
- Class: Insecta
- Order: Lepidoptera
- Family: Sphingidae
- Subfamily: Macroglossinae
- Tribe: Dilophonotini
- Subtribe: Dilophonotina
- Genus: Cautethia; Grote, 1867

Species
- See text

Synonyms
- Braesia Grote & Robinson, 1868; Oenosanda Walker, 1856

= Cautethia =

Genus of moths

Cautethia is a genus of moths in the family Sphingidae first described by Augustus Radcliffe Grote in 1867.

== Species ==
- Cautethia carsusi Haxaire & Schmit, 2001
- Cautethia exuma McCabe, 1984
- Cautethia grotei H. Edwards, 1882
- Cautethia noctuiformis (Walker, 1856)
- Cautethia simitia Schaus, 1932
- Cautethia spuria (Boisduval, 1875)
- Cautethia yucatana Clark, 1919

== Gallery ==
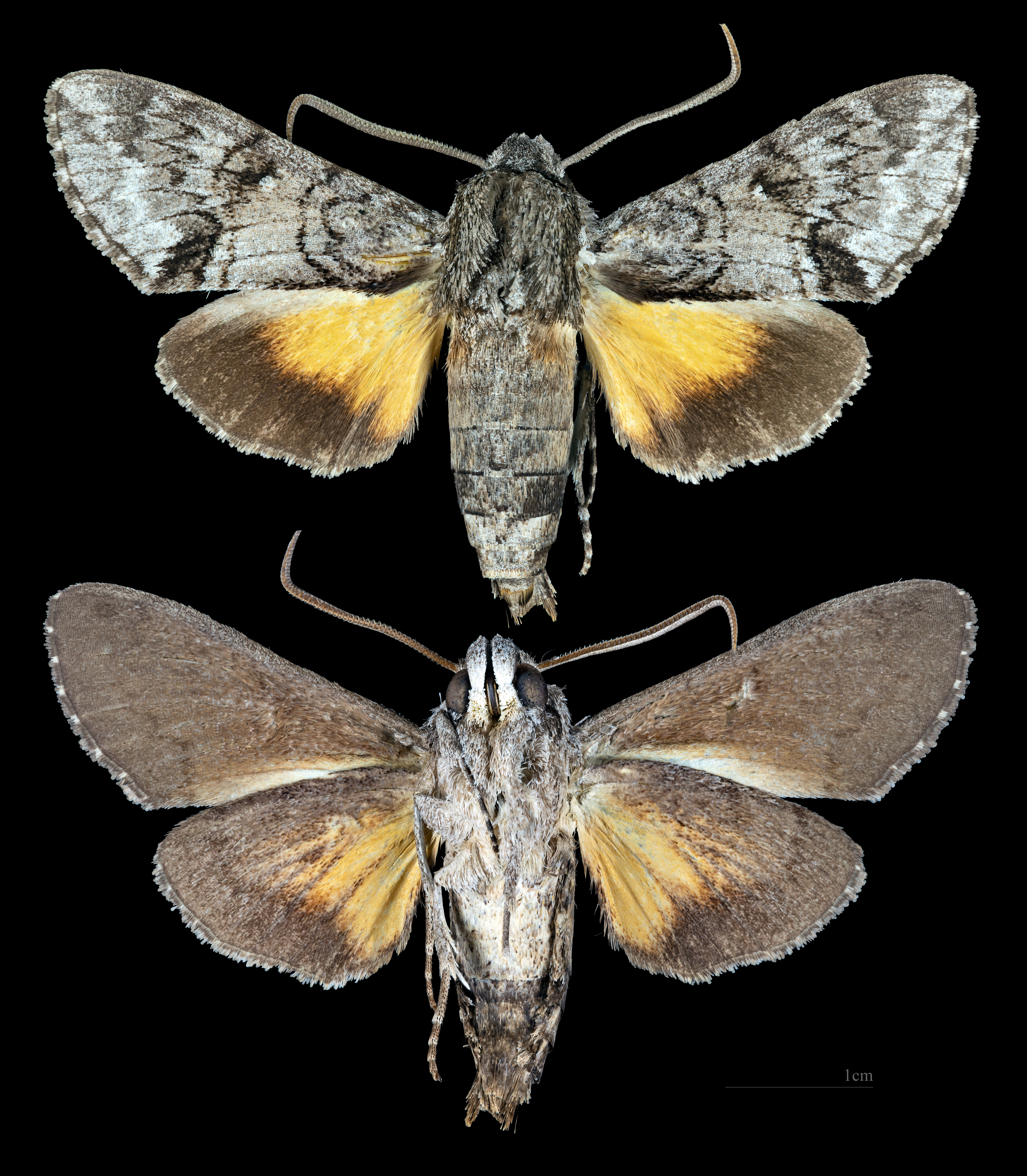
Cautethia grotei

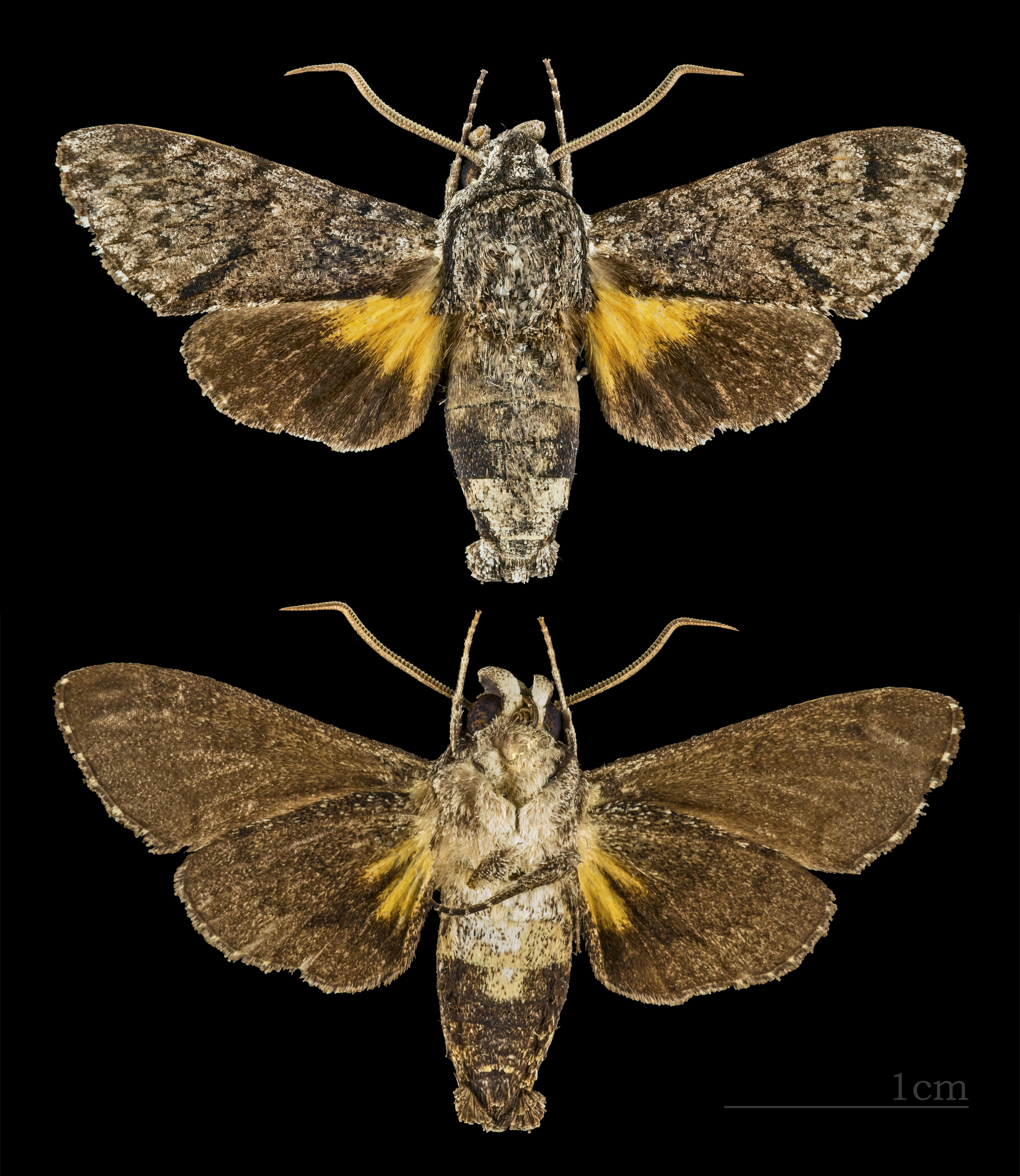
Cautethia spuria

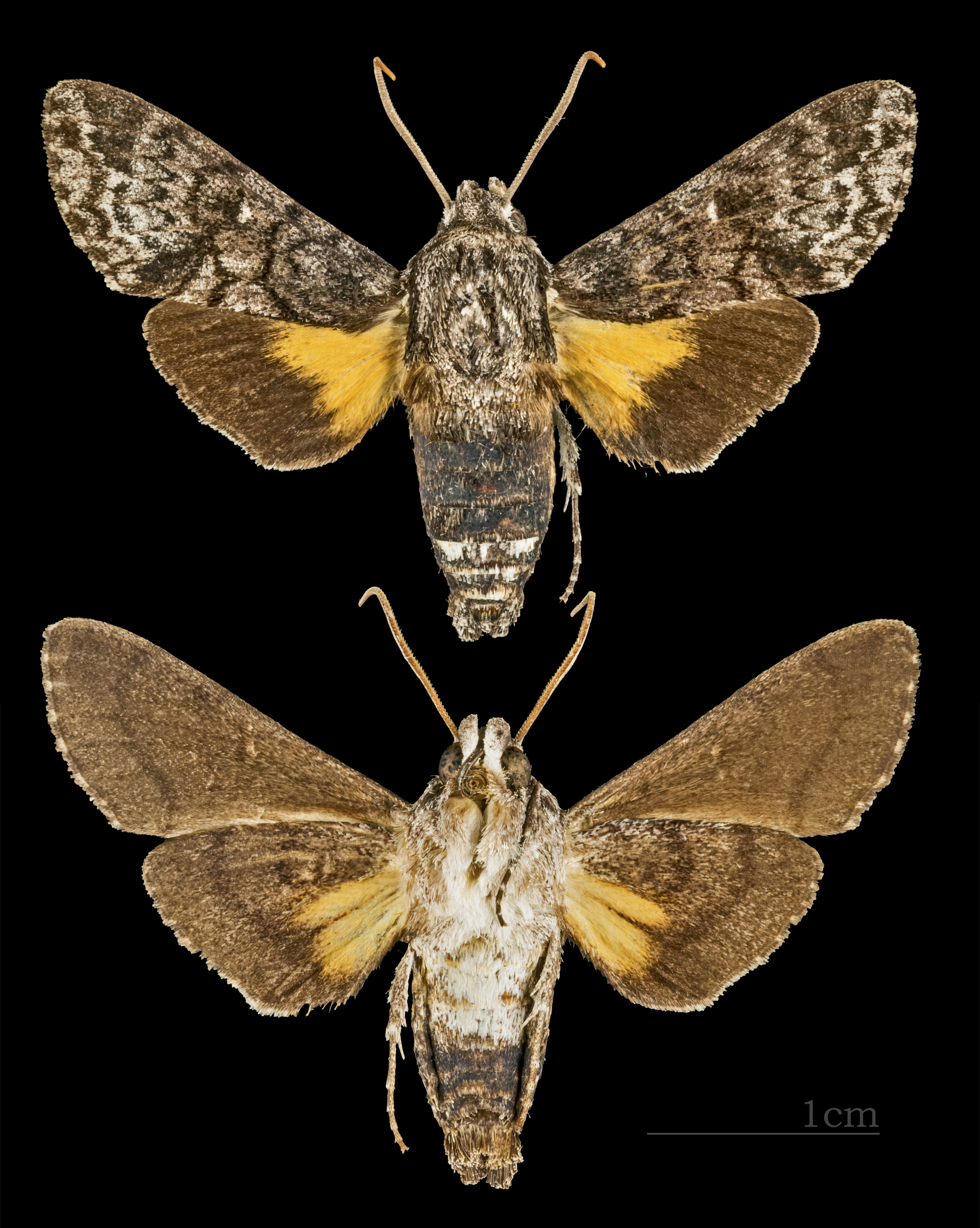
Cautethia yucatana
