= Chiococca motleyana =

Scientific classification
- Kingdom: Plantae
- Clade: Tracheophytes
- Clade: Angiosperms
- Clade: Eudicots
- Clade: Asterids
- Order: Gentianales
- Family: Rubiaceae
- Subfamily: Cinchonoideae
- Tribe: Chiococceae
- Genus: Chiococca
- Species: C. motleyana

Binomial name
- Chiococca motleyana Borhidi (2011)

Synonyms
- Asemnantha pubescens Hook.f. (1873)

Former genus of plants

Chiococca motleyana is a species of flowering plant in the family Rubiaceae. It is a shrub native to the humid tropics of southeastern Mexico, Guatemala, and Belize.
