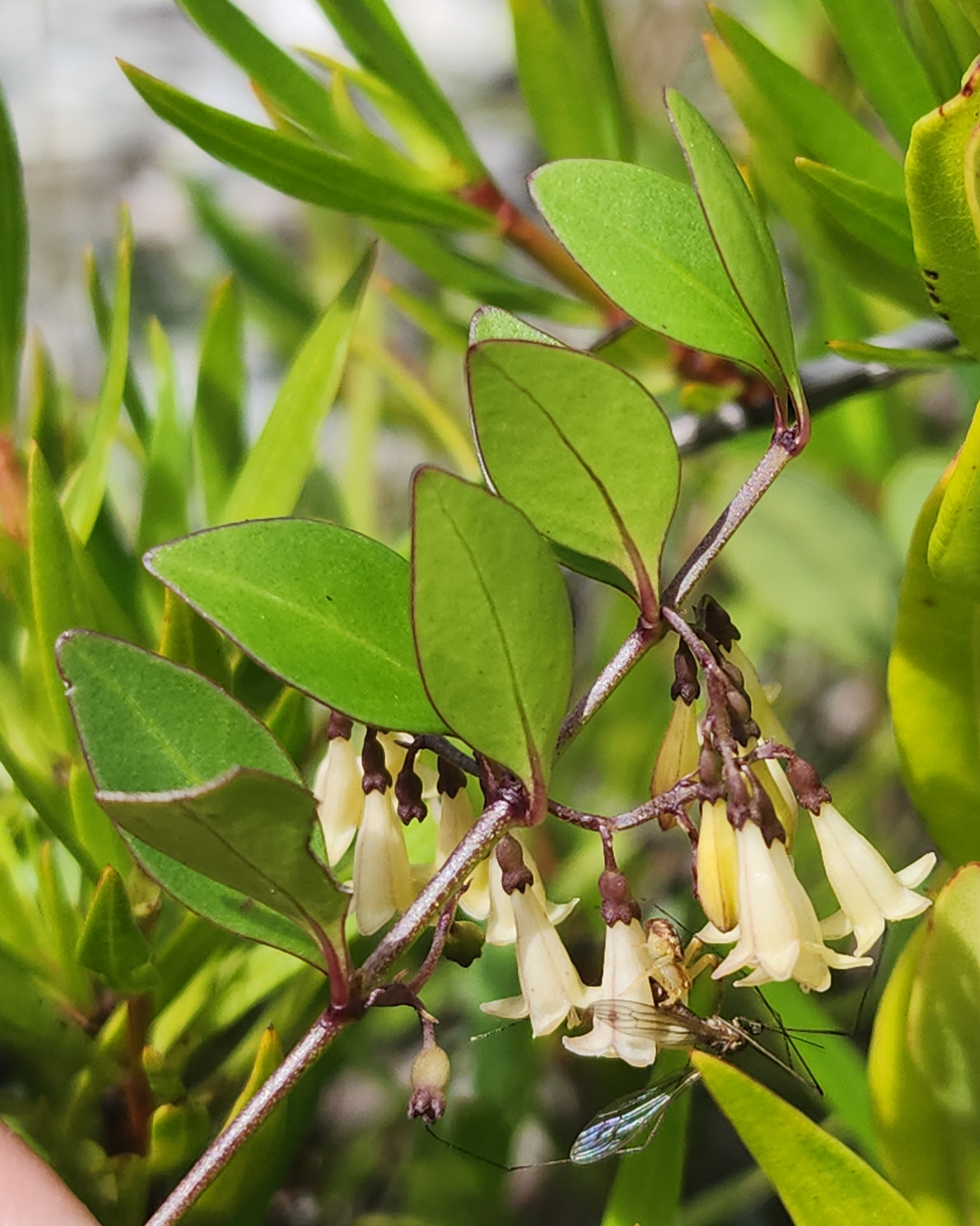
- Blooming in open-canopy pine rockland habitat, Big Pine Key, Florida

Conservation status
- Apparently Secure (NatureServe)

Scientific classification
- Kingdom: Plantae
- Clade: Tracheophytes
- Clade: Angiosperms
- Clade: Eudicots
- Clade: Asterids
- Order: Gentianales
- Family: Rubiaceae
- Genus: Chiococca
- Species: C. parvifolia

Binomial name
- Chiococca parvifolia Wullschl. ex Griseb.

= Chiococca parvifolia =

Species of flowering plant

Chiococca parvifolia, commonly referred to as pineland milkberry, is a species of flowering plant native to the Caribbean and south Florida.

== Habitat ==
It is known to grow in coastal berms, coastal grasslands, rockland hammocks, pine rocklands, and shell middens.
