= Cautethia simitia =

Scientific classification
- Domain: Eukaryota
- Kingdom: Animalia
- Phylum: Arthropoda
- Class: Insecta
- Order: Lepidoptera
- Family: Sphingidae
- Genus: Cautethia
- Species: C. simitia

Binomial name
- Cautethia simitia Schaus, 1932

Species of moth

Cautethia simitia is a species of moth in the family Sphingidae. It was described by Schaus in 1932. It is known from Colombia.

Adults are probably on wing in multiple generations and nectar at flowers.

The larvae probably feed on Rubiaceae species.
