= Arisaema pusillum =

Scientific classification
- Kingdom: Plantae
- Clade: Tracheophytes
- Clade: Angiosperms
- Clade: Monocots
- Order: Alismatales
- Family: Araceae
- Genus: Arisaema
- Species: A. pusillum

Binomial name
- Arisaema pusillum (Peck) Nash

Synonyms
- A. pusillum: Arisaema atrorubens f. pusillum (Peck) Fernald; Arisaema pusillum f. pallidum Eames; Arisaema triphyllum subsp. pusillum (Peck) Huttl.; Arisaema triphyllum var. pusillum Peck; Arisaema triphyllum f. pusillum (Peck) Fernald

Species of flowering plant

Arisaema pusillum is a species of flowering plant in the arum family Araceae. It is a member of the Arisaema triphyllum complex, a group of closely related taxa in eastern North America. The specific name pusillum, which means "very small, slender", describes the overall size of the plant relative to that of the more common Arisaema triphyllum. It is commonly known as the small Jack-in-the-pulpit (or small Jack). It is sometimes referred to as the swamp Jack, not to be confused with Arisaema stewardsonii, which is also known by that name.

== Description ==
Arisaema pusillum is a herbaceous, perennial, flowering plant growing from a corm. Like other members of the Arisaema triphyllum complex, it has three leaflets per leaf. Throughout most of its range, it is a relatively small plant, seldom over 3.5 dm (14 in) tall. In Georgia and Florida, it can reach up to 1.2 m (47 in) tall, but some botanists refer to the latter as Arisaema acuminatum.

=== Similar species ===
The overall habit and character of Arisaema pusillum is very similar to that of Arisaema stewardsonii but the latter is easily distinguished by its strongly fluted spathe tube. Arisaema pusillum is less like Arisaema triphyllum sensu stricto, but since a diagnostic character is lacking, the two species are more difficult to distinguish in practice. The following table of characters compares the three species side-by-side:

	Arisaema pusillum	Arisaema stewardsonii	Arisaema triphyllum
Leaflets	Light green, glossy underneath	Light green, glossy underneath	Glaucous underneath
Spathe tube	Smooth to slightly fluted	Strongly fluted	Smooth to slightly fluted
Spathe hood	Wholly purple or wholly green, rarely purple with fine green stripes	Green with purple stripes	Green with purple stripes or wholly green
Spathe flange	Revolute, 1–3 mm wide	Revolute, 1–3 mm wide	Flat or slightly revolute, 4.5–7 mm wide
Spadix appendix	Cylindric (shaped like a cylinder), 2–5 mm in diameter	Cylindric, 2–5 mm in diameter	Clavate (shaped like a club), 4–10 mm in diameter
Habitat	Hydric (wet) deciduous woodlands, swamps, wetlands	Hydric deciduous woodlands, bogs, swamps, wetlands	Mesic (moist) deciduous woodlands
Range	Primarily southeastern U.S.	Primarily northeastern U.S. and southeastern Canada	Wide ranging across eastern North America

== Taxonomy ==
Arisaema pusillum was first described as Arisaema triphyllum var. pusillum by Charles Horton Peck in his Report of the State Botanist of 1897. Peck's description was based on a specimen collected by Fred Thorne in Millbrook, New York, also in 1897. The variety was given species rank by the American botanist George Valentine Nash in 1901. As of February 2023, the name Arisaema pusillum (Peck) Nash is widely recognized.

Arisaema pusillum is a member of the Arisaema triphyllum complex, a group of closely related taxa that also includes Arisaema acuminatum, Arisaema quinatum, Arisaema stewardsonii, and Arisaema triphyllum. As of March 2023, some authorities consider Arisaema pusillum to be a synonym for Arisaema triphyllum or A. triphyllum subsp. pusillum, However, most authorities accept Arisaema pusillum and the other species-level members of the complex.

== Distribution and habitat ==
Arisaema pusillum is found primarily in the eastern United States, from Louisiana and Mississippi, northward to New York and southern New England. Some sources claim that it occurs as far north as Ontario and Quebec in eastern Canada, while others claim its range extends to New York and southeastern Connecticut but no further. In the southeastern United States, it is common throughout the Appalachian Mountains, from northern Alabama to West Virginia.

== Conservation ==
The global conservation status of Arisaema pusillum is unknown. Based on the conservation status of Arisaema triphyllum subsp. pusillum, it may be inferred that Arisaema pusillum is globally secure (G5). It is uncommon (or worse) in New York (S3?), Quebec (S2?), Illinois (S1S2), and West Virginia (S1).

== Bibliography ==
- Huttleston, Donald G. (1949). "The three subspecies of Arisaema triphyllum". Bulletin of the Torrey Botanical Club. 76 (6): 407–413. doi:10.2307/2482333. JSTOR 2482333.
- Huttleston, Donald G. (1981). "The four subspecies of Arisaema triphyllum". Bulletin of the Torrey Botanical Club. 108 (4): 479–481. doi:10.2307/2484449. JSTOR 2484449.
- Treiber, Miklos (1980). Biosystematics of the Arisaema triphyllum complex (PhD). Chapel Hill: University of North Carolina.
- Weakley, Alan S.; Southeastern Flora Team (2022). "Flora of the southeastern United States". University of North Carolina Herbarium, North Carolina Botanical Garden.
