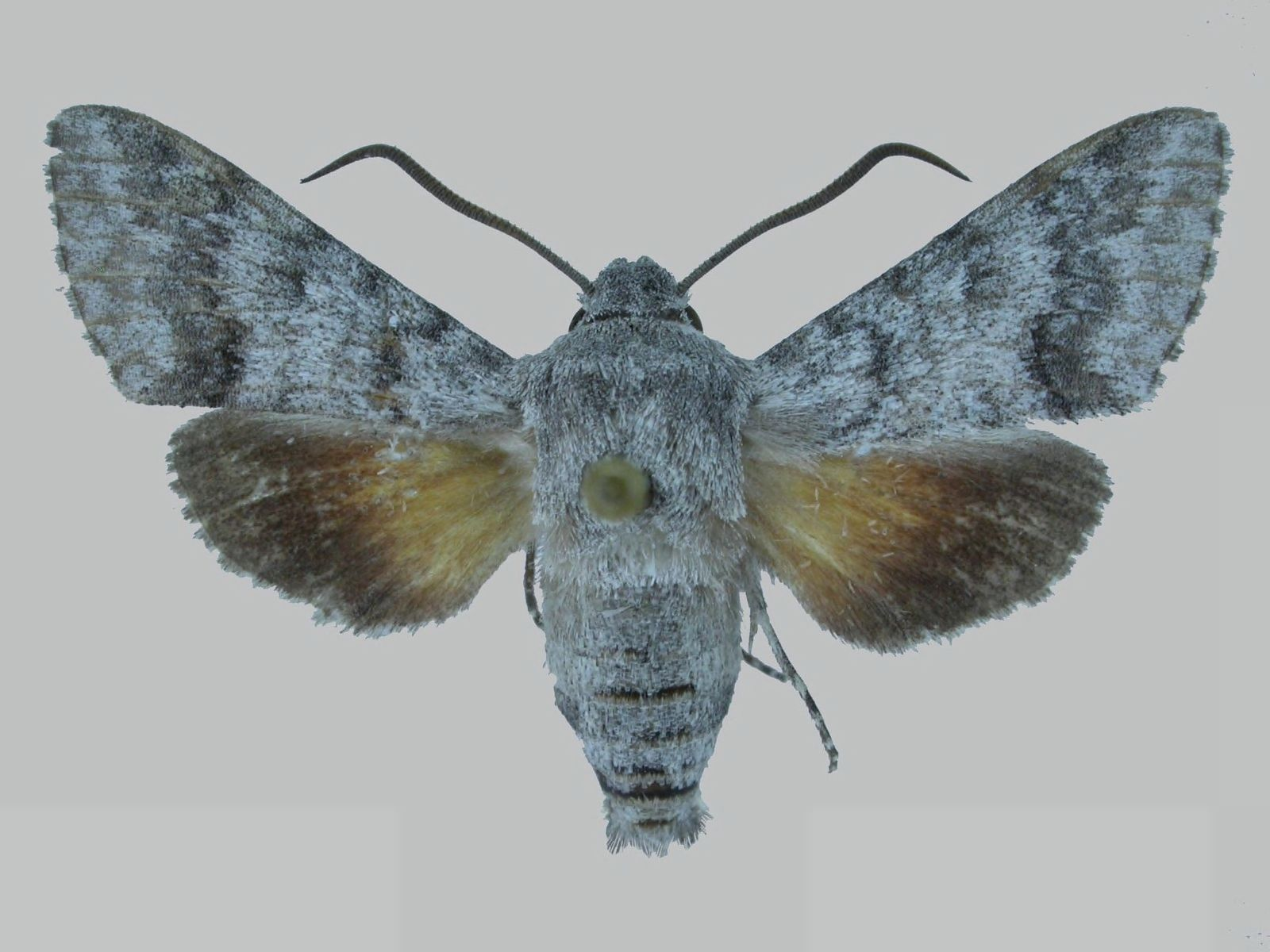
- Male

Scientific classification
- Domain: Eukaryota
- Kingdom: Animalia
- Phylum: Arthropoda
- Class: Insecta
- Order: Lepidoptera
- Family: Sphingidae
- Genus: Cautethia
- Species: C. exuma

Binomial name
- Cautethia exuma McCabe

= Cautethia exuma =

Species of moth

Cautethia exuma is a species of moth in the family Sphingidae, which is known from the Bahamas. It was described by Timothy L. McCabe in 1984.

Moths in this species have a wingspan of 27–32 millimetres. They are immediately distinguishable from all other Cautethia species by the pale yellow-brown basal area of the hindwing upperside.

The larvae probably feed on Rubiaceae species.
