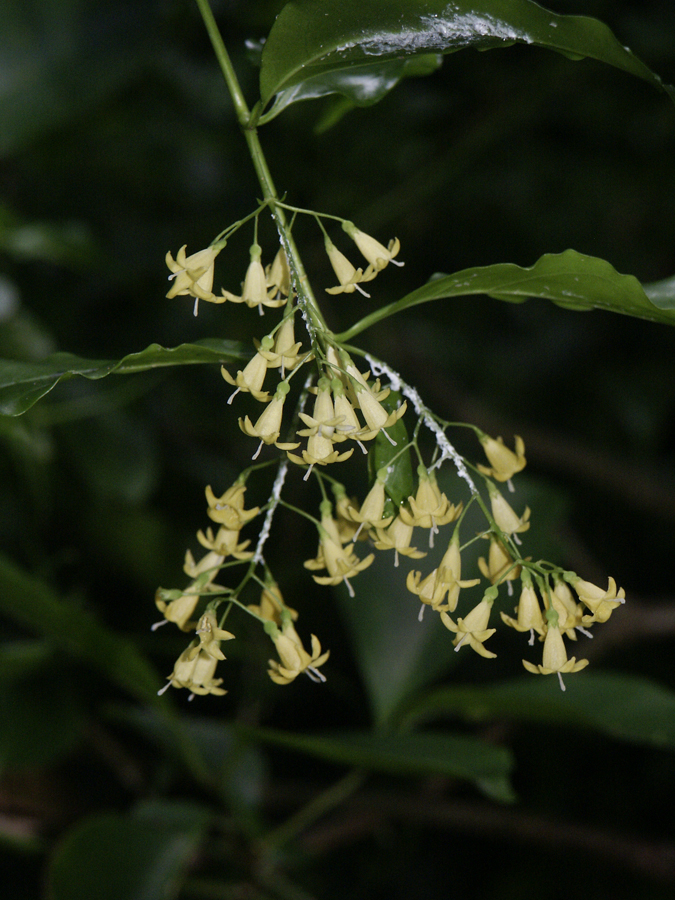
- Chiococca alba

Scientific classification
- Kingdom: Plantae
- Clade: Embryophytes
- Clade: Tracheophytes
- Clade: Spermatophytes
- Clade: Angiosperms
- Clade: Eudicots
- Clade: Asterids
- Order: Gentianales
- Family: Rubiaceae
- Subfamily: Cinchonoideae
- Tribe: Chiococceae
- Genus: Chiococca; P.Browne

Type species
- Chiococca alba (L.) Hitchc.

Synonyms
- Asemnantha Hook.f.

= Chiococca =

Milkberry

Genus of flowering plants

Chiococca is a genus of flowering plants in the family Rubiaceae. It currently holds 23 species that are native to Florida, Texas, Mexico, Central America, much of South America, the West Indies, and the islands of Galápagos and Fernando de Noronha.

The type species for the genus is Chiococca alba. It ranges from Florida to Paraguay and is cultivated as an ornamental.

== Systematics ==
Chiococca was named by Patrick Browne in 1756. The generic name is derived from the Greek words χιών (chion), meaning "snow" and κόκκος (kokkos), meaning "kernel" or "berry".

Chiococca is a member of the tribe Chiococceae. Within the tribe, it is closely related to Bikkia.

== Species ==
- Chiococca alba (L.) Hitchc. – Florida, Texas, Bermuda, Mexico, Central America, much of South America, the West Indies, and the Galápagos
- Chiococca auyantepuiensis Steyerm. – Venezuela
- Chiococca belizensis Lundell – Southern Mexico (Tabasco, Chiapas, Oaxaca, Veracruz), Central America, Colombia
- Chiococca caputensis Lorence & C.M.Taylor – Panama
- Chiococca coriacea M.Martens & Galeotti – Mexico (Tamaulipas, Veracruz, Quintana Roo)
- Chiococca cubensis Urb. – Cuba
- Chiococca filipes Lundell – Central America, Mexico (Chiapas)
- Chiococca henricksonii M.C.Johnst. – Mexico (Coahuila)
- Chiococca insularis (Ridley) C.M.Taylor & M.R.V. Barbosa – Fernando de Noronha, Brazil
- Chiococca lucens Standl. & Steyerm. – Venezuela (Sororopán-tepui)
- Chiococca motleyana Borhidi – Belize, Guatemala, Mexico
- Chiococca multipedunculata Steyerm. – Guyana
- Chiococca naiguatensis Steyerm. – Venezuela
- Chiococca nitida Benth.
  - Chiococca nitida var. amazonica Müll.Arg. – Venezuela, Guyana, Brazil
  - Chiococca nitida var. chimantensis Steyerm. – Venezuela (Bolívar)
  - Chiococca nitida f. cordata (Cowan) Steyerm. – Guyana
  - Chiococca nitida var. nitida – French Guiana, Guyana, Venezuela, Colombia, Brazil, Paraguay
- Chiococca oaxacana Standl. – Mexico (Tamaulipas, Morelos, Puebla, Oaxaca)
- Chiococca pachyphylla Wernham – Mexico (from Nuevo León to Chiapas), Central America, Colombia
- Chiococca parvifolia Wullschl. ex Griseb.
- Chiococca petrina Wiggins – Mexico (Sonora)
- Chiococca phaenostemon Schltdl. – Southern Mexico (Chiapas, Oaxaca, Veracruz, Guerrero), Central America
- Chiococca plowmanii Delprete – Brazil (Bahia)
- Chiococca rubriflora Lundell – Mexico (Chiapas), Guatemala
- Chiococca semipilosa Standl. & Steyerm. – Mexico, Guatemala, Honduras, El Salvador, Nicaragua)
- Chiococca sessilifolia Miranda – Mexico (Veracruz, Chiapas)
- Chiococca steyermarkii Standl. – Guatemala
- Chiococca stricta Correll – Bahamas
