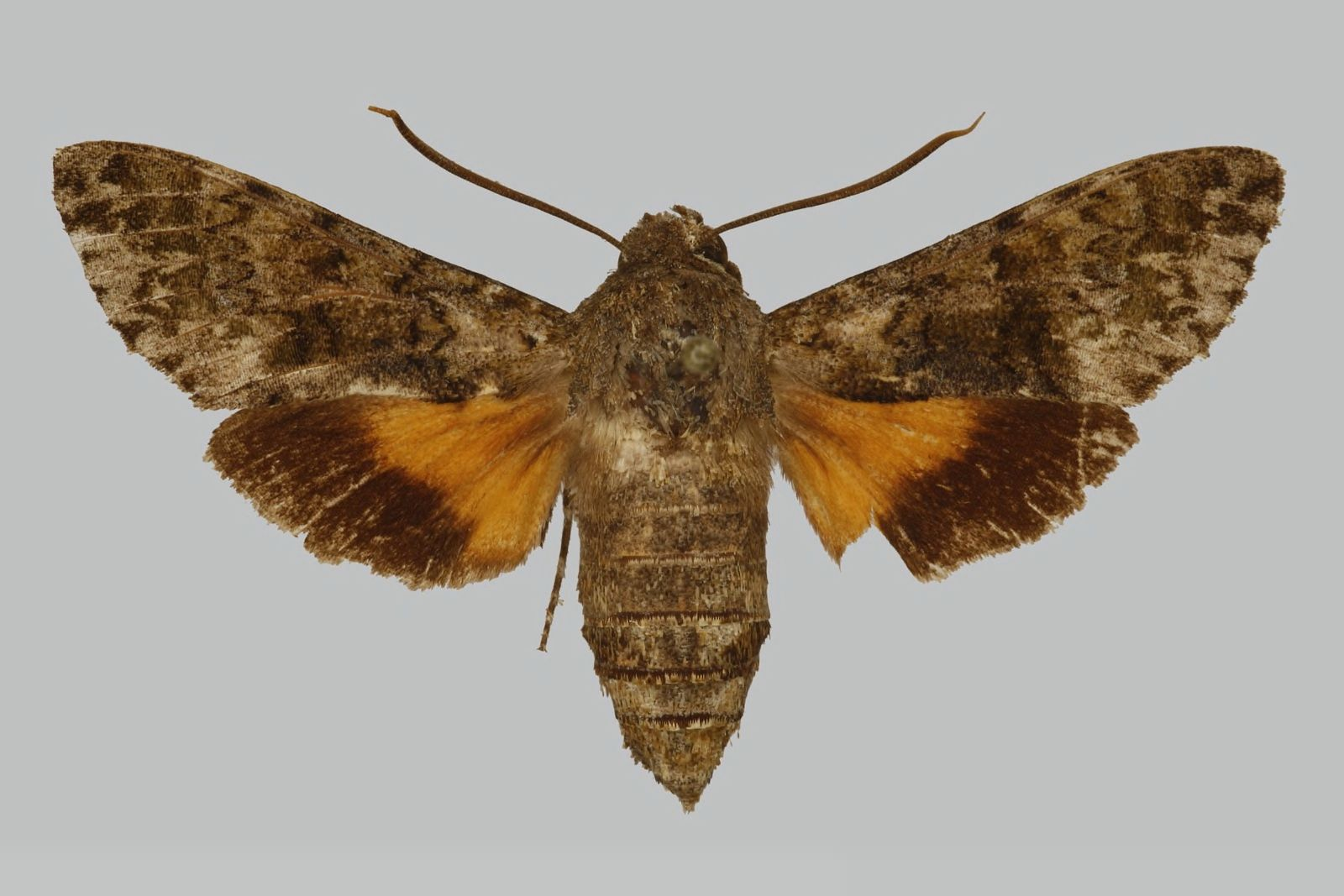
- Female

Scientific classification
- Domain: Eukaryota
- Kingdom: Animalia
- Phylum: Arthropoda
- Class: Insecta
- Order: Lepidoptera
- Family: Sphingidae
- Genus: Cautethia
- Species: C. carsusi

Binomial name
- Cautethia carsusi Haxaire & Schmit, 2001

= Cautethia carsusi =

Species of moth

Cautethia carsusi is a species of moth in the family Sphingidae from the Dominican Republic. It was described by Jean Haxaire and Pierre Schmit in 2001. It is the largest species in the genus Cautethia. The wing length of males is 19.5 millimetres and for females - 20.5 millimetres.
