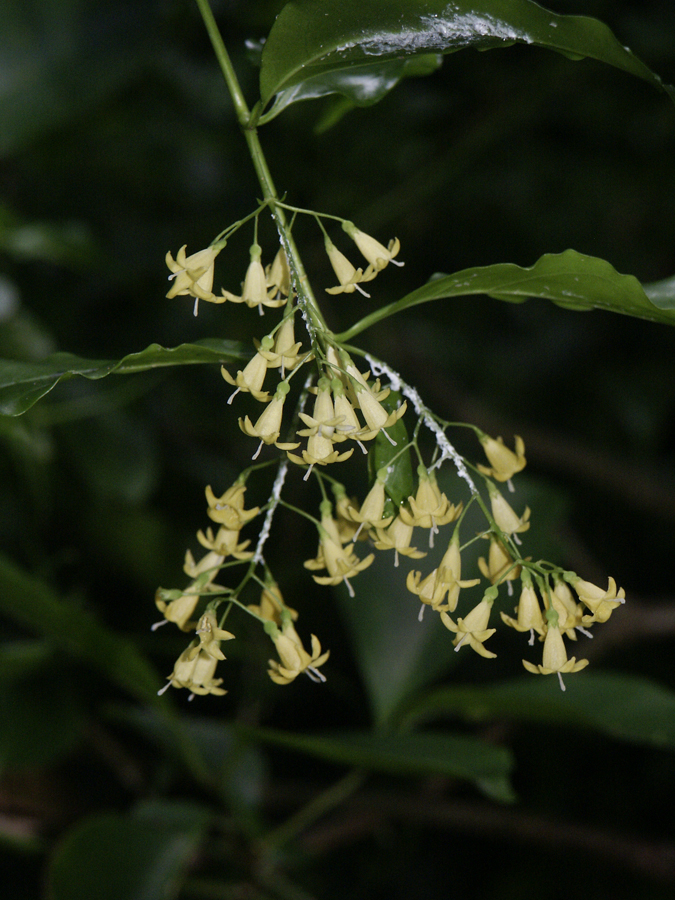

Conservation status
- Least Concern (IUCN 3.1)

Scientific classification
- Kingdom: Plantae
- Clade: Tracheophytes
- Clade: Angiosperms
- Clade: Eudicots
- Clade: Asterids
- Order: Gentianales
- Family: Rubiaceae
- Genus: Chiococca
- Species: C. alba

Binomial name
- Chiococca alba (L.) Hitchc.

Synonyms
- Chiococca bermudiana S.Br.; Chiococca racemosa L.; Lonicera alba L.

= Chiococca alba =

Species of flowering plant

Chiococca alba is a species of flowering plant in the coffee family (Rubiaceae) native to Florida and the extreme southern tip of Texas in the United States, Bermuda, Mexico, Central America, the Caribbean, the Galápagos, and tropical South America. Common names include David's milkberry, West Indian milkberry, cahinca and West Indian snowberry. The specific epithet, alba, means "white" in Latin and refers to the color of its fruits.

== Description ==
West Indian milkberry is an evergreen woody vine or scrambling shrub that often grows on other vegetation and may reach a height of 6 m (20 ft). The opposite, simple leaves are 5–11 cm (2.0–4.3 in) long and may be elliptic to ovate or broadly lanceolate in shape. Yellow, bell-shaped flowers up to 1 cm (0.39 in) in length appear throughout the year on racemes or panicles of six of to eight. The fruit is a white drupe 4–7 mm (0.16–0.28 in) in diameter that generally contains two dark brown seeds.

== Taxonomy ==
Lonicera alba was described in 1753 by Carl Linnaeus. It was moved to Chiococca in 1893 by A. S. Hitchcock, and is considered the type species of that genus. Stewardson Brown described the Bermuda population of the plant as a new species, C. bermudiana, in 1909 due to its lighter green and larger leaves, larger berries, and wider and longer pedicels. Many authorities consider C. bermudiana a synonym of C. alba.

== Uses ==
Chiococca alba is sometimes cultivated as an ornamental for its dark green, evergreen foliage and white drupes. It is used in espalier and grown on trellises. The roots have several uses in herbal medicine, including as a laxative, diuretic, emetic, and antidiarrhoeal. The plant was sold commercially in Europe and the United States for those purposes at one time.
