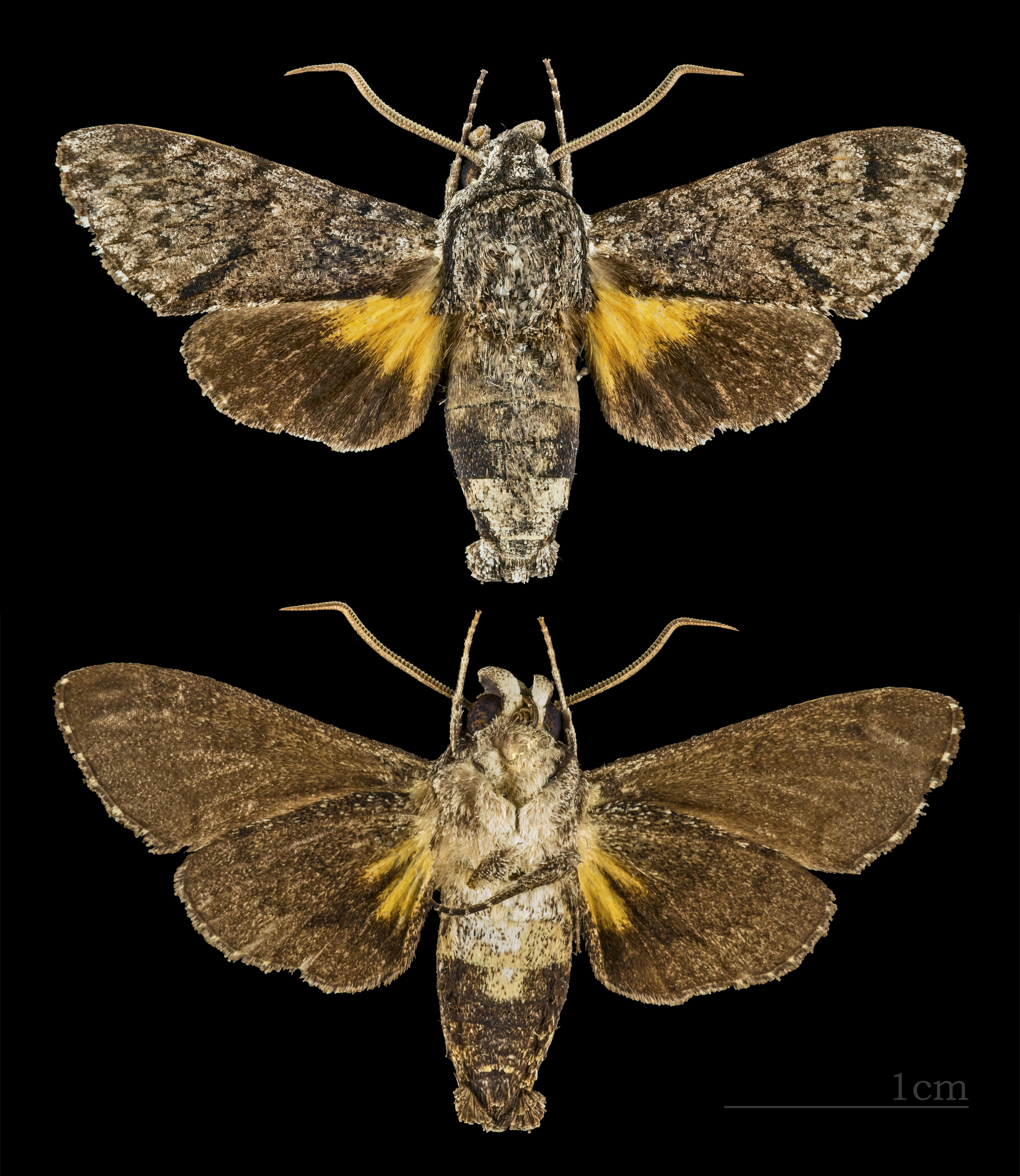

Scientific classification
- Domain: Eukaryota
- Kingdom: Animalia
- Phylum: Arthropoda
- Class: Insecta
- Order: Lepidoptera
- Family: Sphingidae
- Genus: Cautethia
- Species: C. spuria

Binomial name
- Cautethia spuria (Boisduval, 1875)

Synonyms
- Oenosanda spuria Boisduval, 1875

= Cautethia spuria =

Spurious sphinx

Species of moth

Cautethia spuria, the spurious sphinx, is a moth of the family Sphingidae. The species was first described by Jean Baptiste Boisduval in 1875. It lives from Mexico to Costa Rica to southern Texas and Oklahoma on the North American continent.

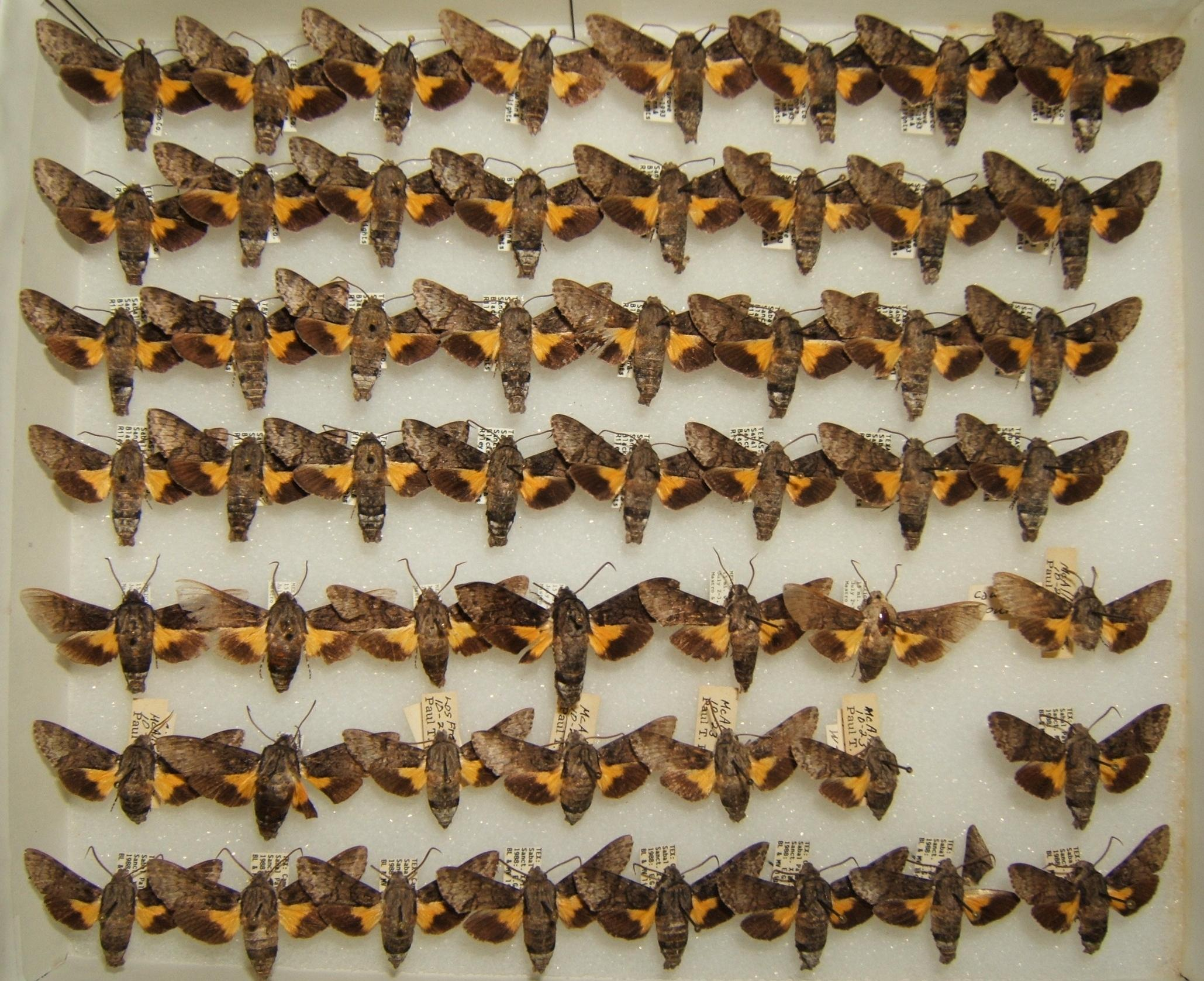
Variations
