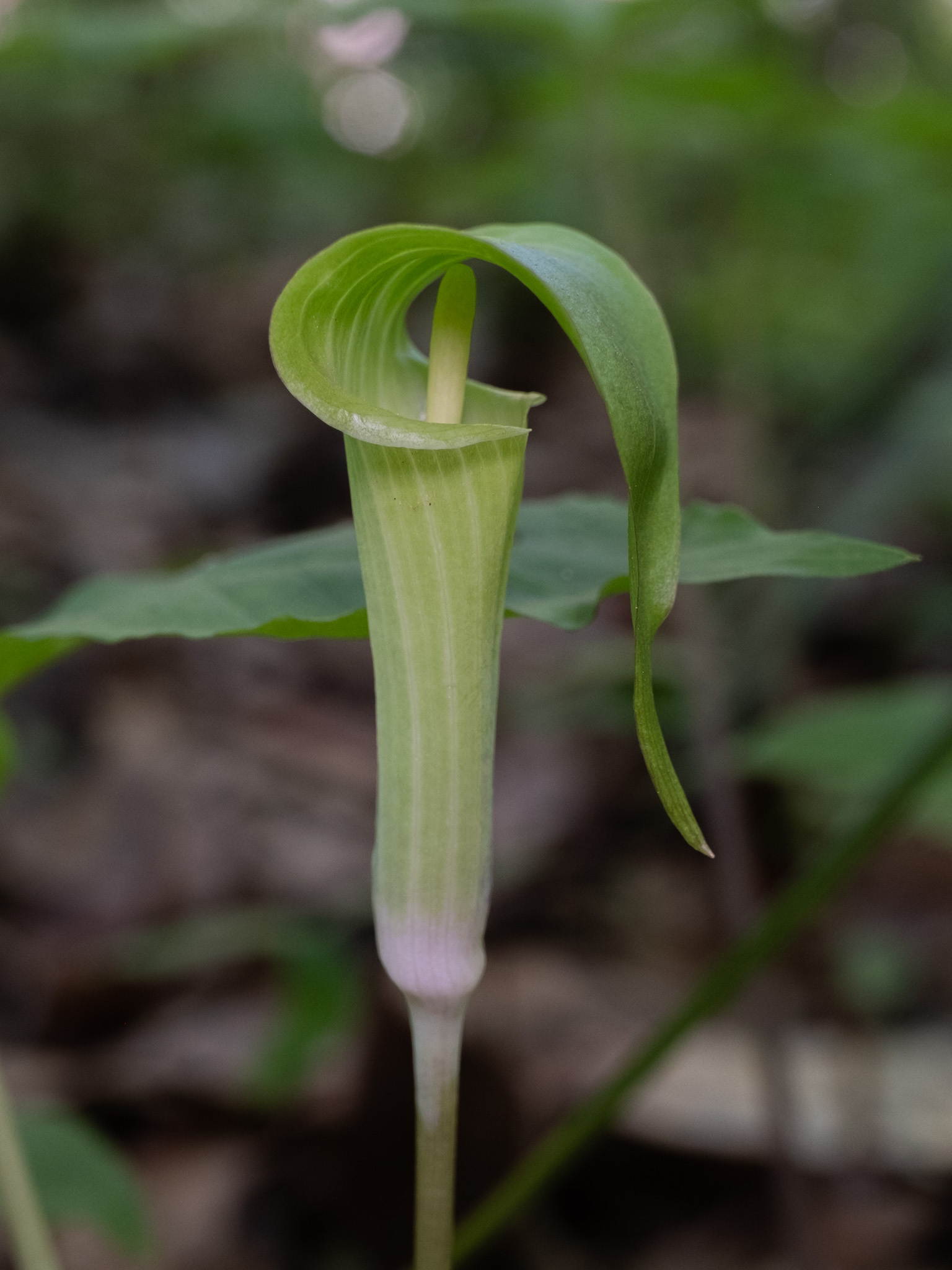

Scientific classification
- Kingdom: Plantae
- Clade: Tracheophytes
- Clade: Angiosperms
- Clade: Monocots
- Order: Alismatales
- Family: Araceae
- Genus: Arisaema
- Species: A. acuminatum

Binomial name
- Arisaema acuminatum Small

Synonyms
- Arisaema triphyllum var. acuminatum (Small) Engl.

= Arisaema acuminatum =

Species of flowering plant

Arisaema acuminatum is a species of flowering plant in the arum family Araceae. It is a member of the Arisaema triphyllum complex, a group of closely related taxa in eastern North America. The specific name acuminatum means "with a long, narrow and pointed tip", which describes the shape of the spathe hood. The species is commonly known as the Florida Jack-in-the-pulpit.

== Description ==
Arisaema acuminatum is a herbaceous, perennial, flowering plant growing from a corm. Like other members of the Arisaema triphyllum complex, it has three leaflets per leaf. Its spathe hood is wholly green, "over twice as long as broad", with a long-acuminate tip.

== Taxonomy ==
Arisaema acuminatum was first described and named by John Kunkel Small in 1903. Its type specimen was collected in Clearwater, Florida, a city on Florida's west coast. At the time, Small believed that the species was endemic to Florida.

Arisaema acuminatum is a member of the Arisaema triphyllum complex, a group of closely related taxa that also includes Arisaema pusillum, Arisaema quinatum, Arisaema stewardsonii, and Arisaema triphyllum. As of March 2023, most authorities consider Arisaema acuminatum to be a synonym for Arisaema triphyllum or A. triphyllum var. acuminatum. A few authorities accept Arisaema acuminatum and the other species-level members of the complex.

== Distribution and habitat ==
Arisaema acuminatum occurs primarily in Central Florida, hence the common name Florida Jack-in-the-pulpit. Its range extends southward into the Florida peninsula and northward along the coast of eastern Georgia. It is claimed to occur in east Texas as well, but confirmation of that claim is needed.

== Conservation ==
The global conservation status of Arisaema acuminatum is unknown.

== Bibliography ==
- Small, John Kunkel (1903). Flora of the Southeastern United States. New York.
- Weakley, Alan S.; Southeastern Flora Team (2022). "Flora of the southeastern United States". University of North Carolina Herbarium, North Carolina Botanical Garden.
