= Stewardson Brown =

American ornithologist and botanist (1867–1921)

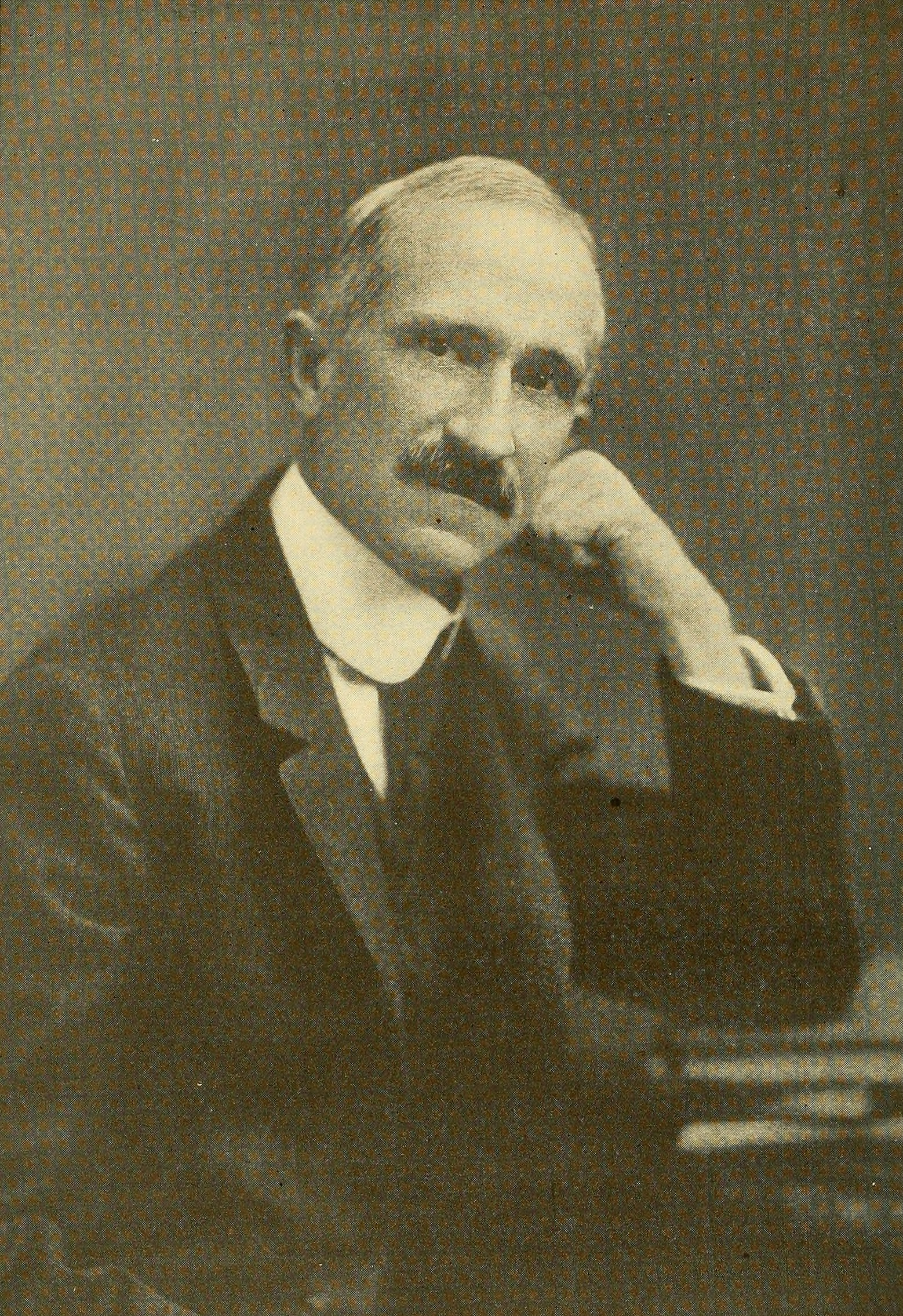
- Born: April 29, 1867
- Died: March 14, 1921 (aged 53)
- Known for: curator of the herbarium at the Philadelphia Academy of Natural Sciences
- Scientific career
- Fields: botany

Stewardson Brown (April 29, 1867 – March 14, 1921) was an American botanist who served as curator of the herbarium at the Philadelphia Academy of Natural Sciences. He collected plants in the New Jersey Pine Barrens, the Florida Keys, the Canadian Rockies, and Bermuda. The standard author abbreviation S.Br. is used to indicate this person as the author when citing a botanical name.
