= Acrocercops ipomoeae =

Scientific classification
- Kingdom: Animalia
- Phylum: Arthropoda
- Class: Insecta
- Order: Lepidoptera
- Family: Gracillariidae
- Genus: Acrocercops
- Species: A. ipomoeae

Binomial name
- Acrocercops ipomoeae Busck, [1934]

Species of moth

Acrocercops ipomoeae is a moth of the family Gracillariidae. It is known from Cuba.

The larvae feed on Jacquemontia and Ipomoea species, including Ipomoea batatas. They probably mine the leaves of their host plant.
