= Allium jacquemontii =

高原薤 gao yuan xie

Scientific classification
- Kingdom: Plantae
- Clade: Tracheophytes
- Clade: Angiosperms
- Clade: Monocots
- Order: Asparagales
- Family: Amaryllidaceae
- Subfamily: Allioideae
- Genus: Allium
- Subgenus: A. subg. Polyprason
- Species: A. jacquemontii

Binomial name
- Allium jacquemontii Kunth

Synonyms
- Allium miserabile Wendelbo

Species of plant

Allium jacquemontii is a plant species native to India, Pakistan, Afghanistan, Tajikistan, Xizang (Tibet) and Xinjiang. It grows high in the mountains at elevations of 4,000–4,500 metres (13,100–14,800 ft).

Allium jacquemontii forms solitary egg-shaped bulbs about 10 millimetres (0.39 in) across. Scapes are up to 40 centimetres (16 in) tall. Umbel forms a hemisphere of many densely packed red or purple flowers.

== Taxonomy ==
The Latin specific epithet jacquemontii refers to the French botanist and geologist Victor Jacquemont (1844–1912).
