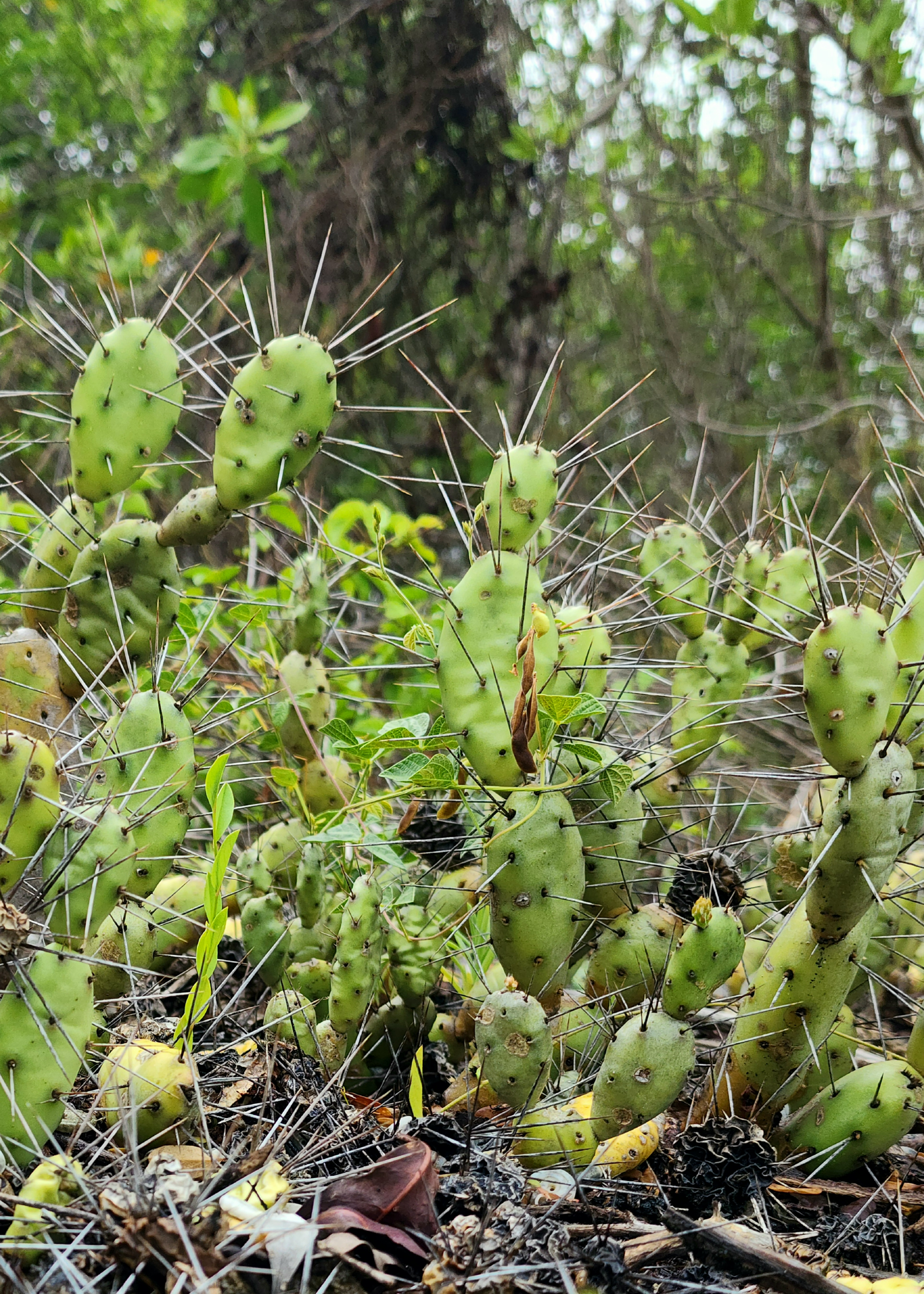
- Growing in Keys cactus barren

Conservation status
- Critically Endangered (IUCN 3.1)

- Critically Imperiled (NatureServe)

Scientific classification
- Kingdom: Plantae
- Clade: Tracheophytes
- Clade: Angiosperms
- Clade: Eudicots
- Order: Caryophyllales
- Family: Cactaceae
- Genus: Opuntia
- Species: O. abjecta

Binomial name
- Opuntia abjecta Small ex Britton and Rose

= Opuntia abjecta =

Species of cactus

Opuntia abjecta is a critically endangered cactus species endemic to the Florida Keys.

== Description ==
O. abjecta grows up to 15 (occasionally 25) cm tall on humus over limestone or even on bare limestone. Cladodes are typically 2.5 cm long by 4–5 cm long. The cladodes do not shatter, but do de-attach from each other with some ease. O. abjecta is a small plant with radiating branches, a subshrub. Retorse, barbed spines are reddish-brown as they develop and turn pale white as they mature. up to 3 spines are produced by terminal cladodes. Generally, the spines of O. abjecta are shorter than 4 cm. The flower bud of O. abjecta is rounded. O. abjecta has teardrop-shaped leaves. The seeds are about 4 mm in diameter.

== Phylogeny ==
O. abjecta was mistakenly conflated with O. triacantha. Recent work shows that the two taxa are distinct. In addition to morphological and phylogenetic differences, O. triacantha occurs in Cuba, whereas O. abjecta occurs in Florida.

== Habitat ==
This species is primarily associated with coastal rock barrens and rockland hammocks.

These barrens are home to an increasingly rare plant community referred to as Keys cactus barrens. This community consists of mostly herbaceous plants growing on open-canopy limestone exposures, specifically of the Key Largo series.

These barrens are functionally an ecotone between mangrove forests and rockland hammocks. These related hammocks are often a thorn scrub variety of the community, which may intermix with patches of cactus barren.

Species associated with this rare plant community include many locally rare herbaceous species, including: skyblue clustervine (Jacquemontia pentanthos), dwarf bindweed (Evolvulus convolvuloides), Yucatan flymallow (Cienfuegosia yucatanensis), and Keys indigo (Indigofera oxycarpa). Other succulents or cacti that occur in this habitat include: triangle cactus (Acanthocereus tetragonus), false sisal (Agave decipiens), and members of the Opuntia stricta species complex. Despite woody species being less prominent in this community, some important ones include: gumbo limbo (Bursera simaruba) and green buttonwood (Conocarpus erectus).

As of 2010 there were 6 known sites, 4 in the Upper Keys and 2 in the Lower Keys.

== Conservation ==
The species is only known from 4 sites where it is threatened by habitat loss, invasive species including exotic plants and the cactus moth (whose larvae can cause fatal infestations), storm surge, and sea level rise.

== Gallery ==
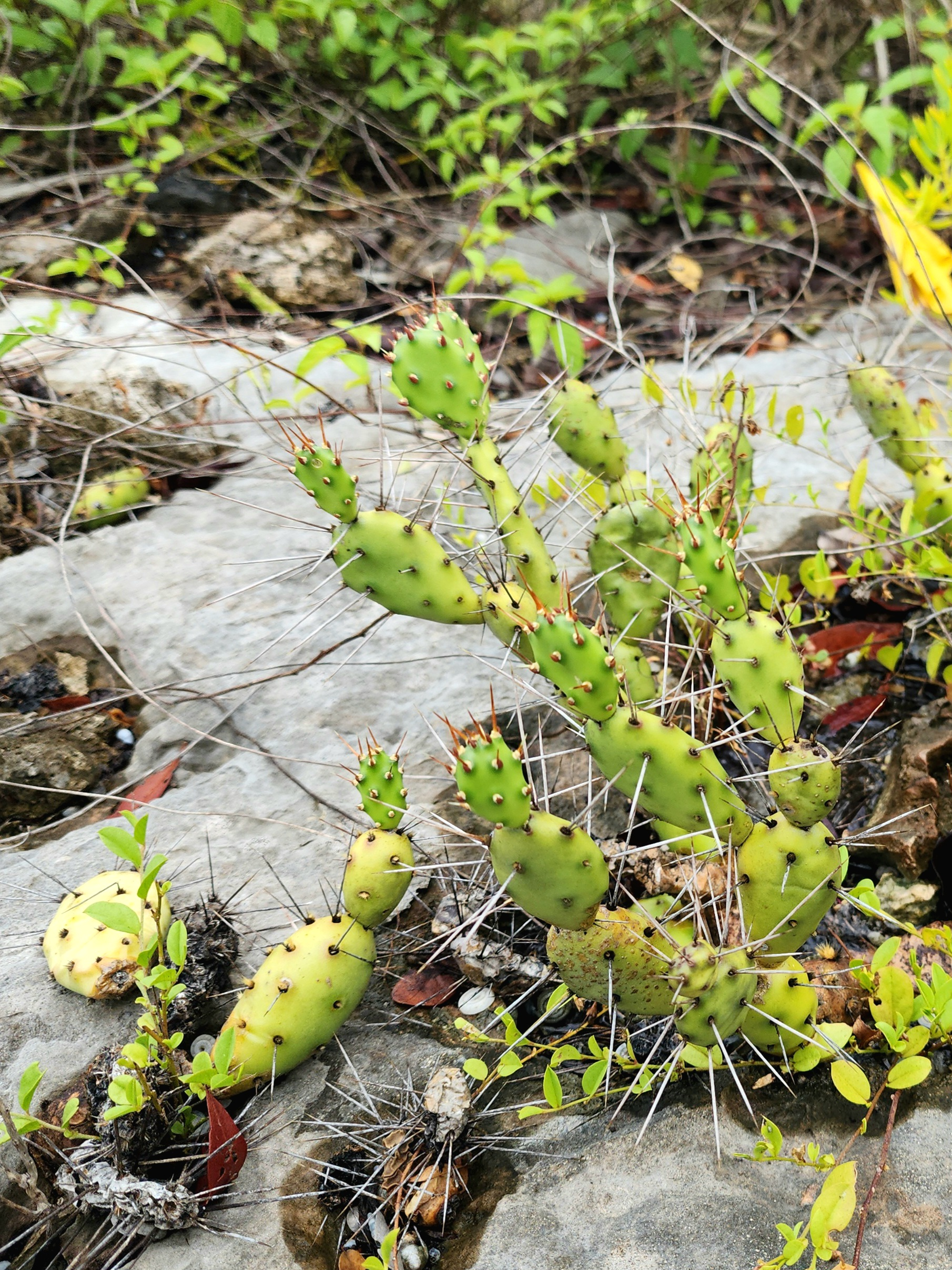
