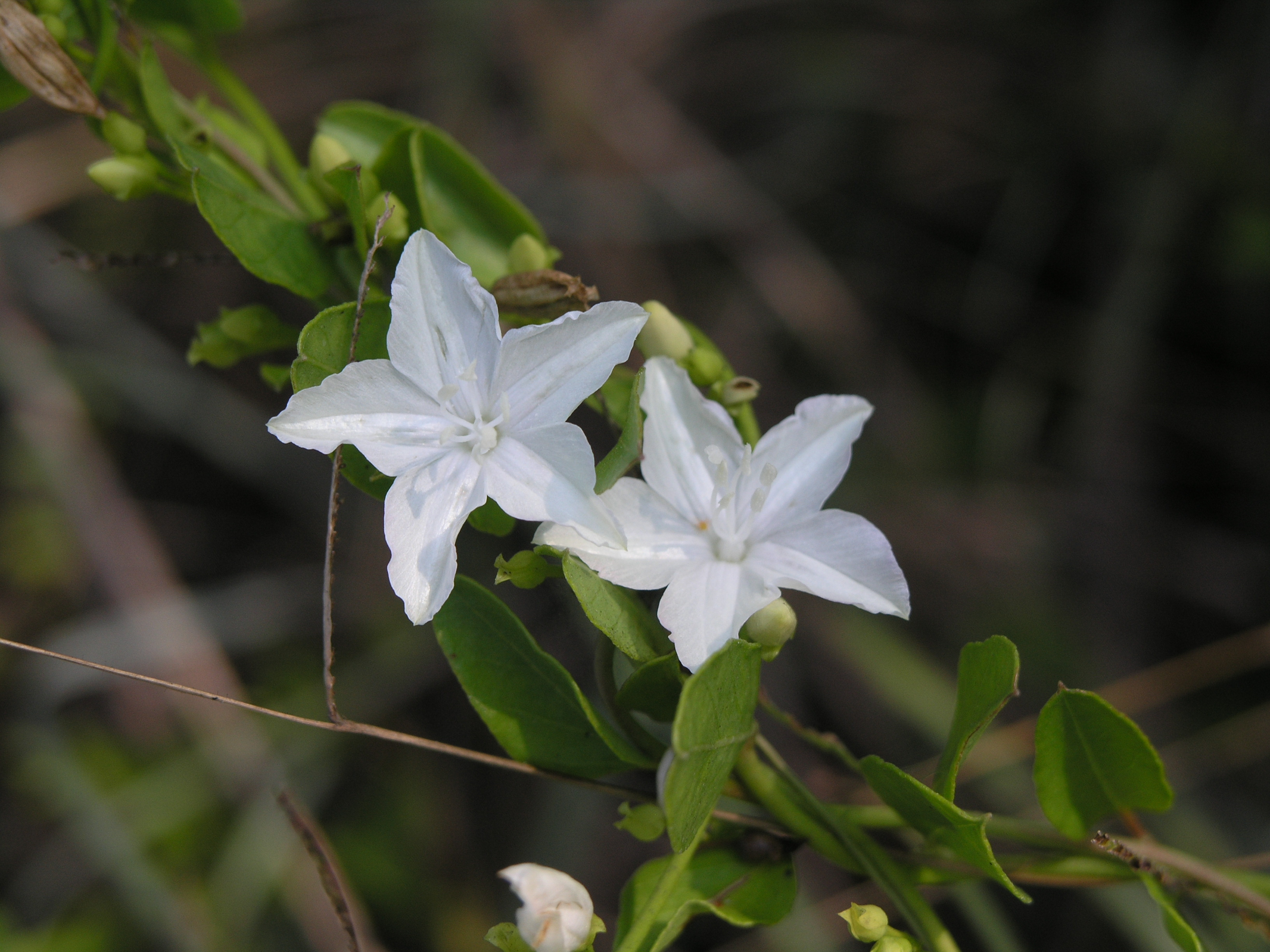

Conservation status
- Critically Imperiled (NatureServe)

Scientific classification
- Kingdom: Plantae
- Clade: Tracheophytes
- Clade: Angiosperms
- Clade: Eudicots
- Clade: Asterids
- Order: Solanales
- Family: Convolvulaceae
- Genus: Jacquemontia
- Species: J. reclinata

Binomial name
- Jacquemontia reclinata House ex Small

= Jacquemontia reclinata =

Species of flowering plant

Jacquemontia reclinata is a rare species of flowering plant in the morning glory family known by the common names beach clustervine, reclined clustervine, and beach jacquemontia. It is endemic to the southeastern coast of Florida, mainly within the South Florida metropolitan area, in the United States, where little of its native habitat remains. It is a federally listed endangered species.

This is a creeping vine that has a woody base and stems that grow up to a meter long. The stems may climb on other plants. The vine produces fleshy leaves up to 3 centimeters long and star-shaped white flowers. The plant grows on barrier islands, where it can be found in several types of habitat, such as sand dunes and tropical hardwood hammocks. It grows in sunny open and disturbed areas, bare patches historically created by hurricanes and today sometimes created by human activity. Other plants growing in this type of habitat include seagrape (Coccoloba uvifera) and Madagascar periwinkle (Catharanthus roseus).

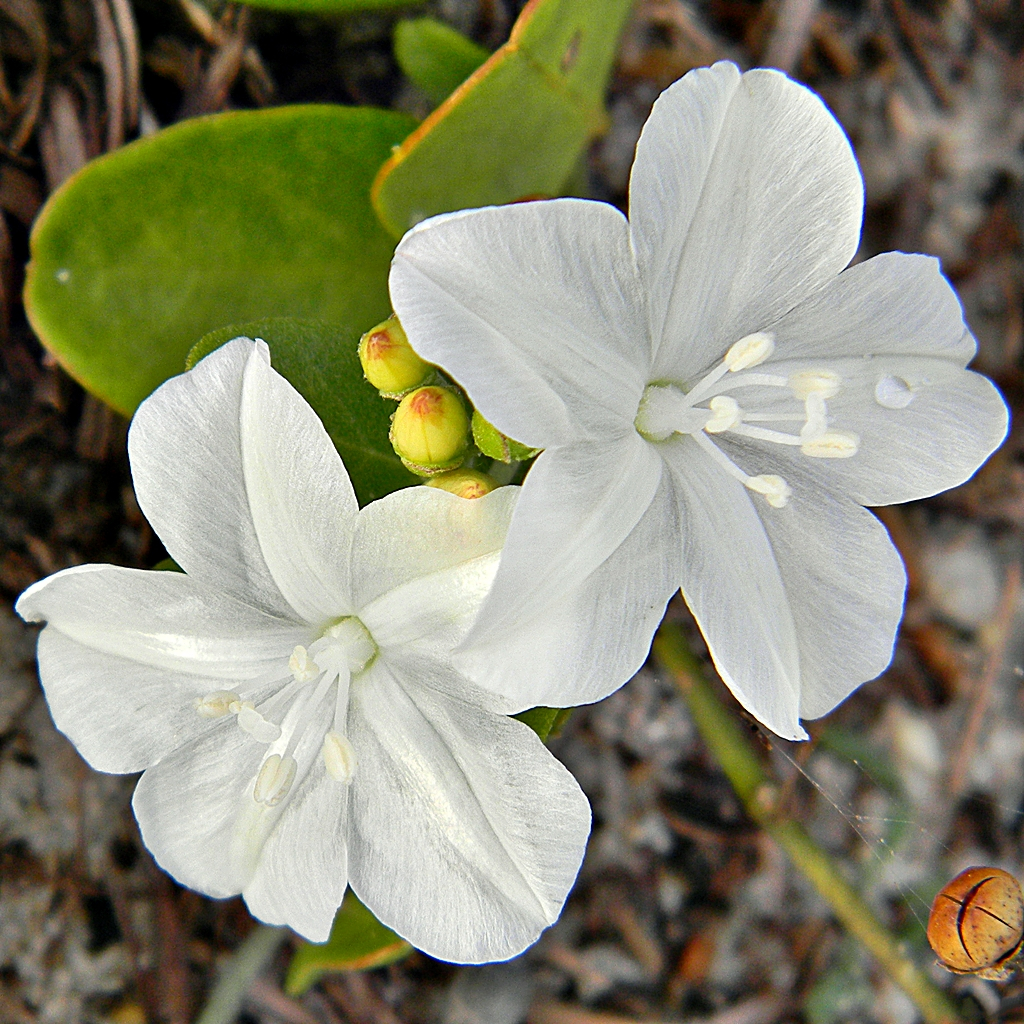

In 2001 there were ten known populations of this plant for a total of about 733 individuals. In 2007 it was estimated that the total population had decreased 13% since the year 2000. The species is present in Broward, Palm Beach, and Dade Counties. It was known from Martin County but it is thought to be extirpated there. The coastal strips of these counties are heavily populated and constantly expanding, leading to the consumption of natural habitat for residential, commercial, and other uses. Remaining occurrences of the plant are on land that is fragmented and degraded. It is invaded by introduced plant species such as Brazilian pepper (Schinus terebinthifolius). Recreation and beach erosion threaten the plant.
