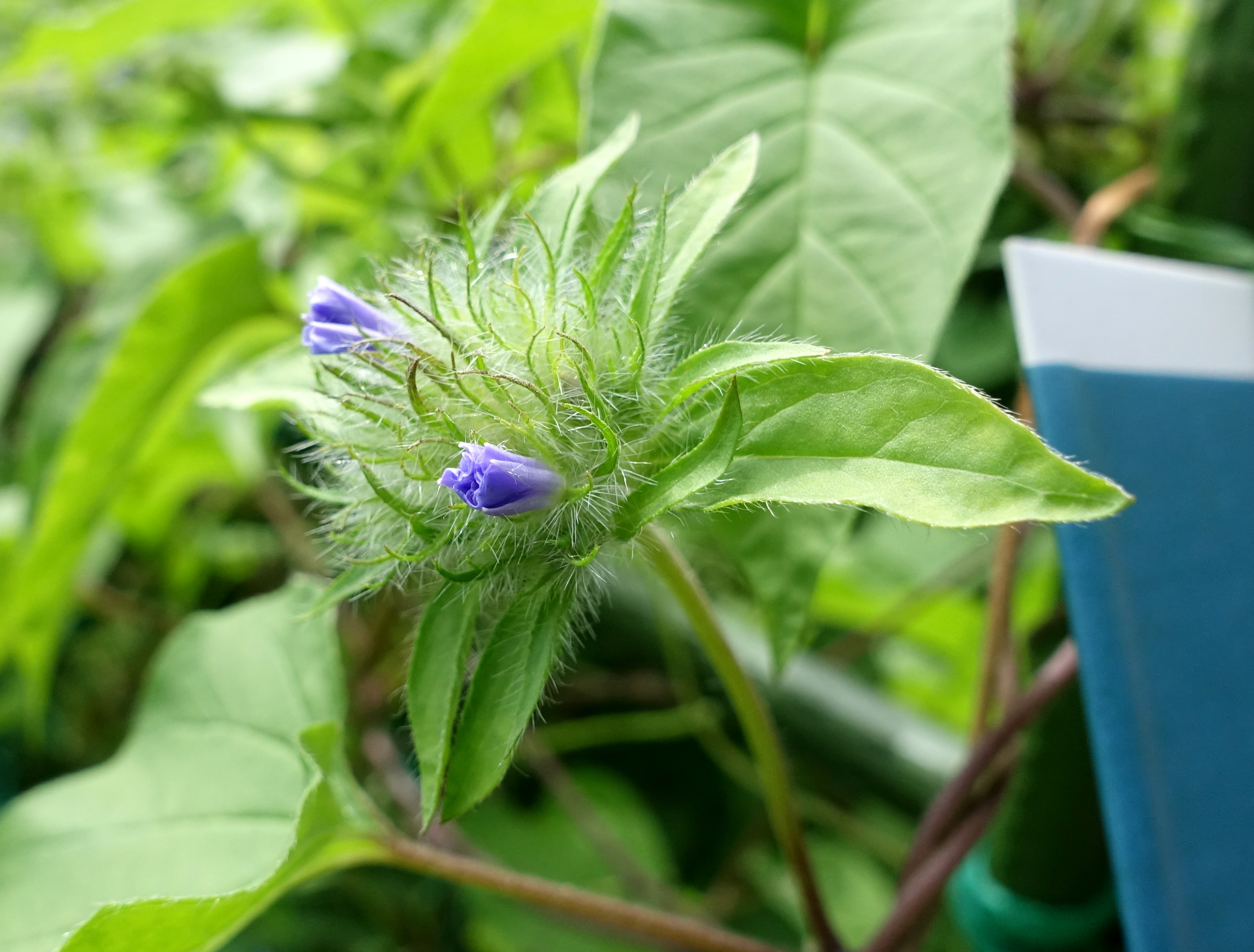

Scientific classification
- Kingdom: Plantae
- Clade: Tracheophytes
- Clade: Angiosperms
- Clade: Eudicots
- Clade: Asterids
- Order: Solanales
- Family: Convolvulaceae
- Genus: Jacquemontia
- Species: J. tamnifolia

Binomial name
- Jacquemontia tamnifolia (L.) Griseb.

= Jacquemontia tamnifolia =

Species of plant

Jacquemontia tamnifolia, the common jacquemontia, is a herbaceous, annual, twining vine found throughout the Americas.

== Description ==
The leaves are ovate to elliptic-ovate in shape, measuring 5 to 12 centimeters in length, with acuminate tips and cordate bases, though the base may occasionally be rounded. Peduncles are equal to or longer than the subtending leaf. The inflorescence is capitate, approximately 2 to 3 centimeters in diameter, and is subtended by lanceolate to elliptic, leafy bracts. Sepals are lanceolate to subulate and densely covered with fulvous (tawny-colored) hairs. The corolla is blue and funnelform, with a diameter of 1 to 2 centimeters. The stigma has two lobes, which are ovoid or oblong in shape; the styles are fused, and the ovary is two-locular. The fruit is a subglobose capsule, measuring 4 to 6 millimeters in diameter. Seeds are brownish-black, glabrous (smooth), and approximately 2 millimeters long.

== Distribution and habitat ==
Jacquemontia tamnifolia is widespread throughout North America, Central America, South America, and the West Indies. In the United States, it is found from Southeastern Virginia south to Florida and west to Arkansas and Texas. It grows in fields, along roadsides, and in other disturbed areas.
