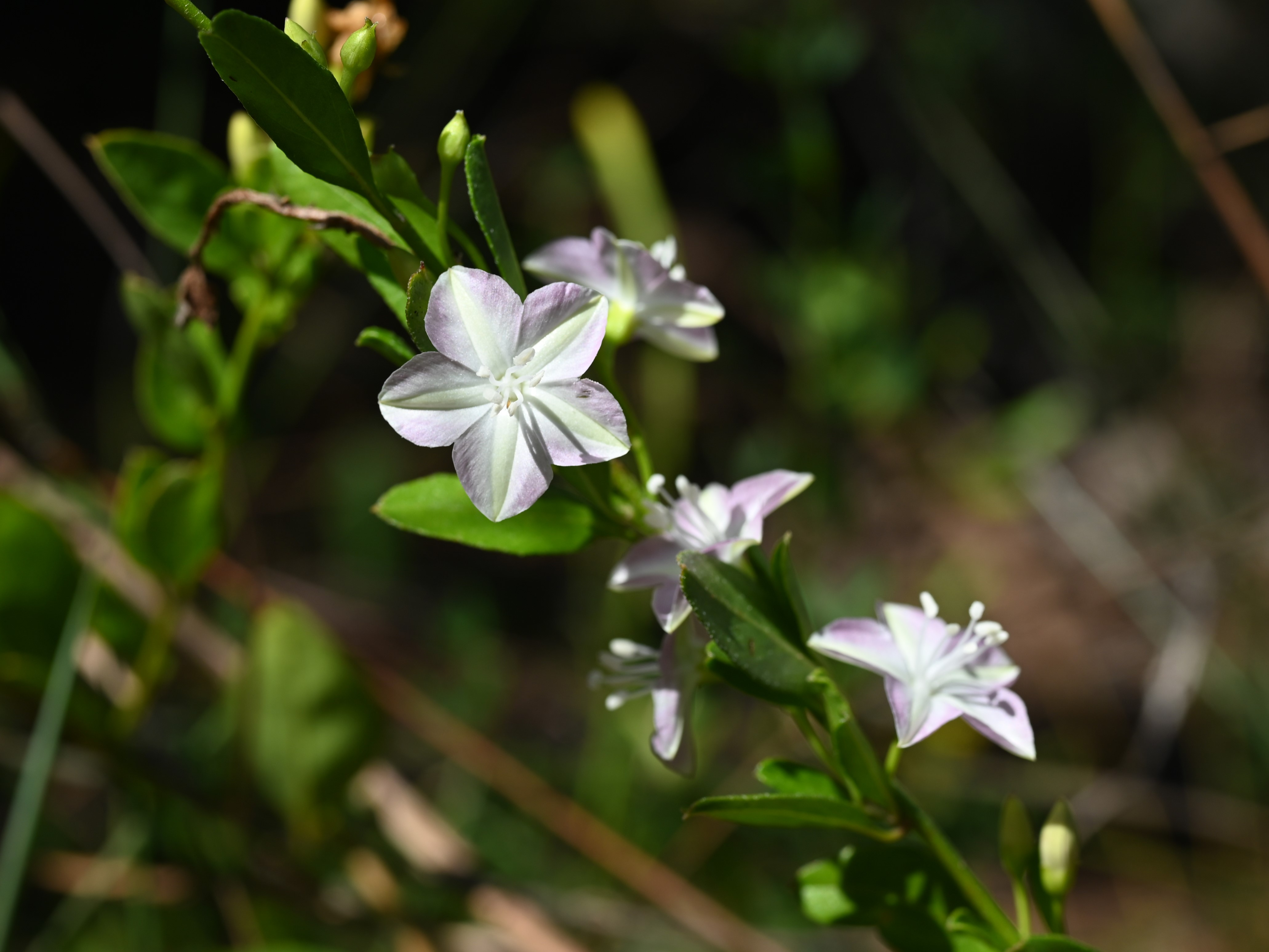

Conservation status
- Imperiled (NatureServe)

Scientific classification
- Kingdom: Plantae
- Clade: Tracheophytes
- Clade: Angiosperms
- Clade: Eudicots
- Clade: Asterids
- Order: Solanales
- Family: Convolvulaceae
- Genus: Jacquemontia
- Species: J. curtissii

Binomial name
- Jacquemontia curtissii Peter ex Hallier f.

= Jacquemontia curtissii =

Species of flowering plant

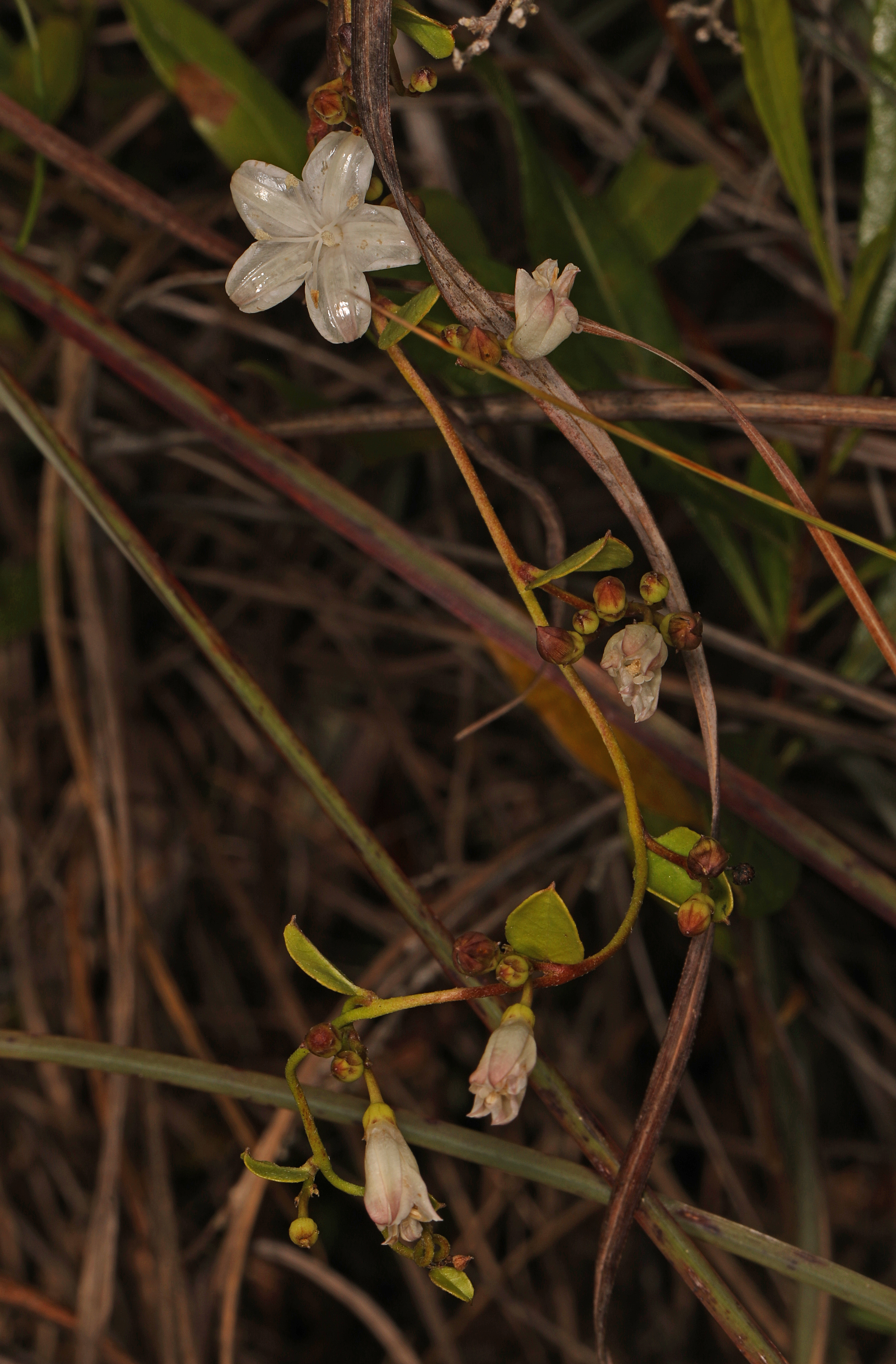
At Everglades National Park in December 2023

Jacquemontia curtissii, commonly known as pineland clustervine or pineland jacquemontia, is a rare species of flowering plant in the family Convolvulaceae. The species is endemic to southern Florida, where it is restricted to pine rockland and associated calcareous habitats. Florida lists the plant as threatened.

== Description ==
A dicot and a perennial, it has white flowers. The plant often grows up to 3 ft (0.91 m) in height.

J. curtissii is a perennial, low-growing vine or trailing herb with slender, spreading or weakly twining stems arising from a woody or semi-woody base. Leaves are simple, ovate to narrowly ovate, with entire margins. The flowers are white, showy, and star-shaped, with a rotate to shallowly funnel-shaped corolla, borne singly or in small axillary clusters.

Flowering typically occurs from autumn through late spring, most abundantly between October and June, although flowering may extend into summer under favorable conditions.

== Distribution and habitat ==
The species is endemic to southern Florida, United States, with a highly localized and fragmented distribution primarily along the Miami Rock Ridge and nearby areas of Miami-Dade and northern Broward counties, as well as parts of the Big Cypress region.

J. curtissii is strongly associated with pine rockland ecosystems, a globally imperiled habitat characterized by exposed limestone substrate, seasonal moisture variation, and an open canopy dominated by South Florida slash pine (Pinus elliottii var. densa). It may also occur in closely related habitats such as mesic pine flatwoods and calcareous wet prairies.

== Ecology ==
The species is adapted to open, fire-maintained landscapes and benefits from periodic burning that reduces canopy closure and competition. Its flowers provide nectar for native insects, including bees and other pollinators, contributing to pollination networks within pine rockland communities.

== Conservation status ==
J. curtissii is considered imperiled due to extensive habitat loss, fragmentation, and fire suppression throughout its limited range. Pine rocklands have been reduced to a small fraction of their historical extent by urban development and agricultural conversion.

The species is tracked by state and regional conservation agencies and is included in ex situ conservation programs, with seed collections maintained by institutions such as Fairchild Tropical Botanic Garden as part of efforts to preserve South Florida's endemic flora.
