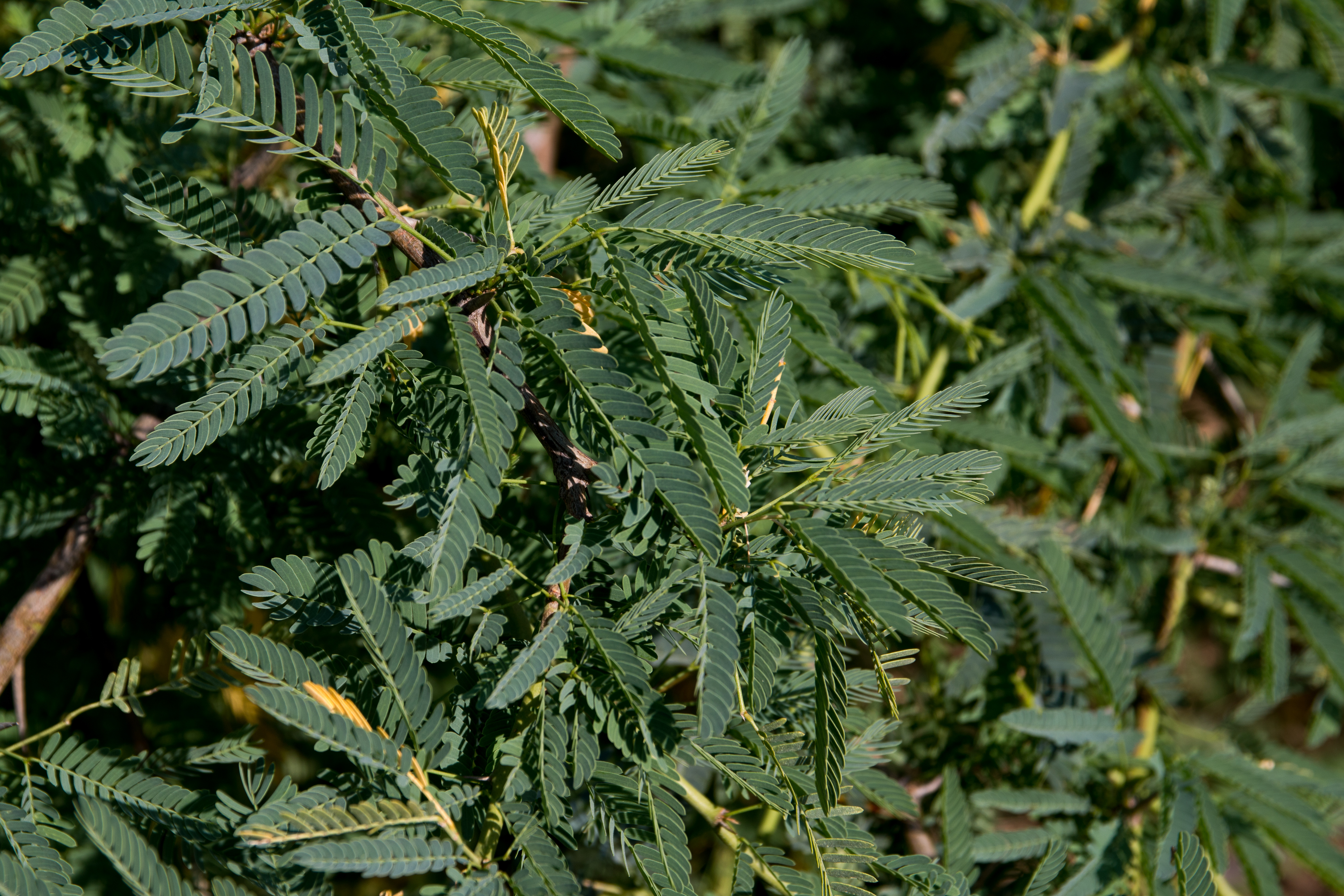

Conservation status
- Least Concern (IUCN 3.1)

Scientific classification
- Kingdom: Plantae
- Clade: Tracheophytes
- Clade: Angiosperms
- Clade: Eudicots
- Clade: Rosids
- Order: Fabales
- Family: Fabaceae
- Subfamily: Caesalpinioideae
- Clade: Mimosoid clade
- Genus: Vachellia
- Species: V. jacquemontii

Binomial name
- Vachellia jacquemontii (Benth.) Ali

Synonyms
- Acacia jacquemontii Benth.

= Vachellia jacquemontii =

Species of legume

Vachellia jacquemontii is a species of plant native to the Thar Desert of India and Pakistan. The species name refers to French botanist Victor Jacquemont. It grows as an erect shrub or small tree, usually 6 feet (1.8 m) to 10 feet (3.0 m) high, with multiple shoots coming from below ground.

This plant has a number of traditional medicinal uses, including treatment of snakebite, induction of abortion, and for chronic renal disease.

This shrub also plays an important role in stabilizing the sand dunes of its native desert habitat. The wood is valuable as firewood because it produces a large amount of heat. The branches are used in construction of huts and fences and the sturdy roots are used as rope.

== See also ==
- Arid Forest Research Institute
