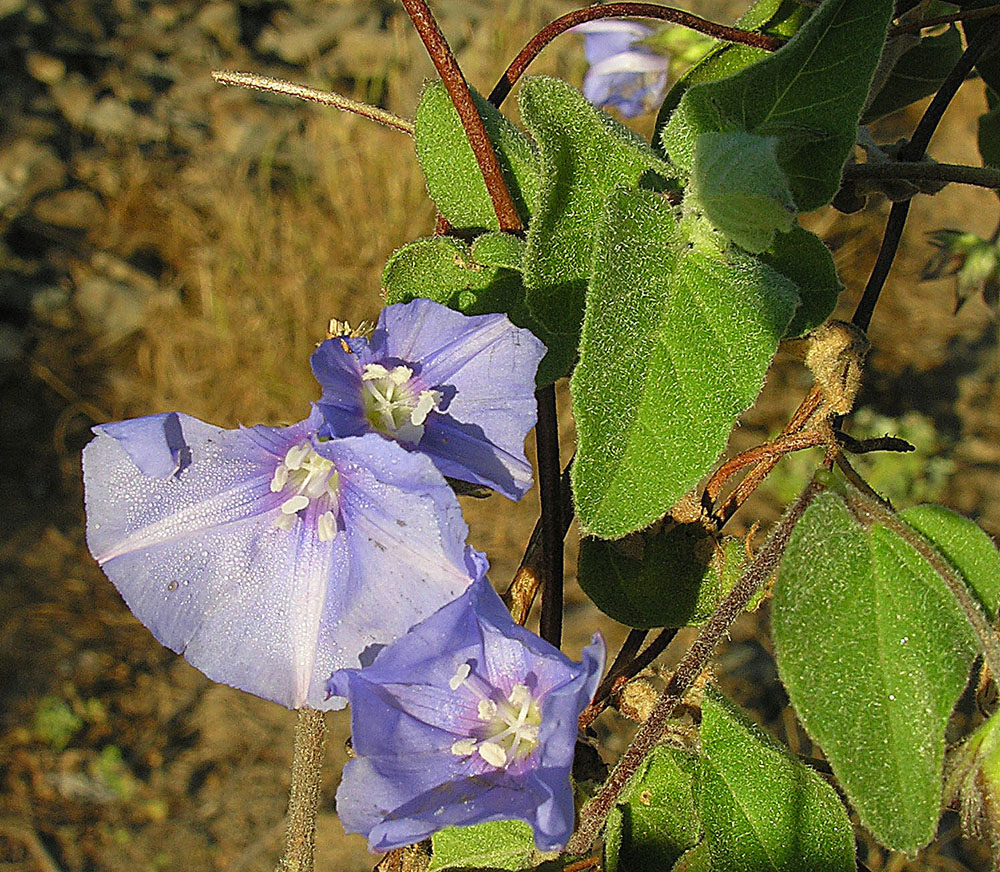

Scientific classification
- Kingdom: Plantae
- Clade: Tracheophytes
- Clade: Angiosperms
- Clade: Eudicots
- Clade: Asterids
- Order: Solanales
- Family: Convolvulaceae
- Genus: Jacquemontia
- Species: J. abutiloides

Binomial name
- Jacquemontia abutiloides Benth. (1844)

= Jacquemontia abutiloides =

Species of flowering plant

Jacquemontia abutiloides is a species of vining plant in the bindweed family (Convolvulaceae) commonly known as the felt-leaf clustervine or felt-leaf morning-glory. A perennial characterized by wooly leaves and blue to whitish flowers, this species grows as a woody plant to shrub with vining upper stems. Flowering is from September to June. It is near-endemic to the Baja California peninsula, Mexico, concentrated mostly around the central peninsula south of the Vizcaino Desert, and found on some of the coastal islands.

== Description ==
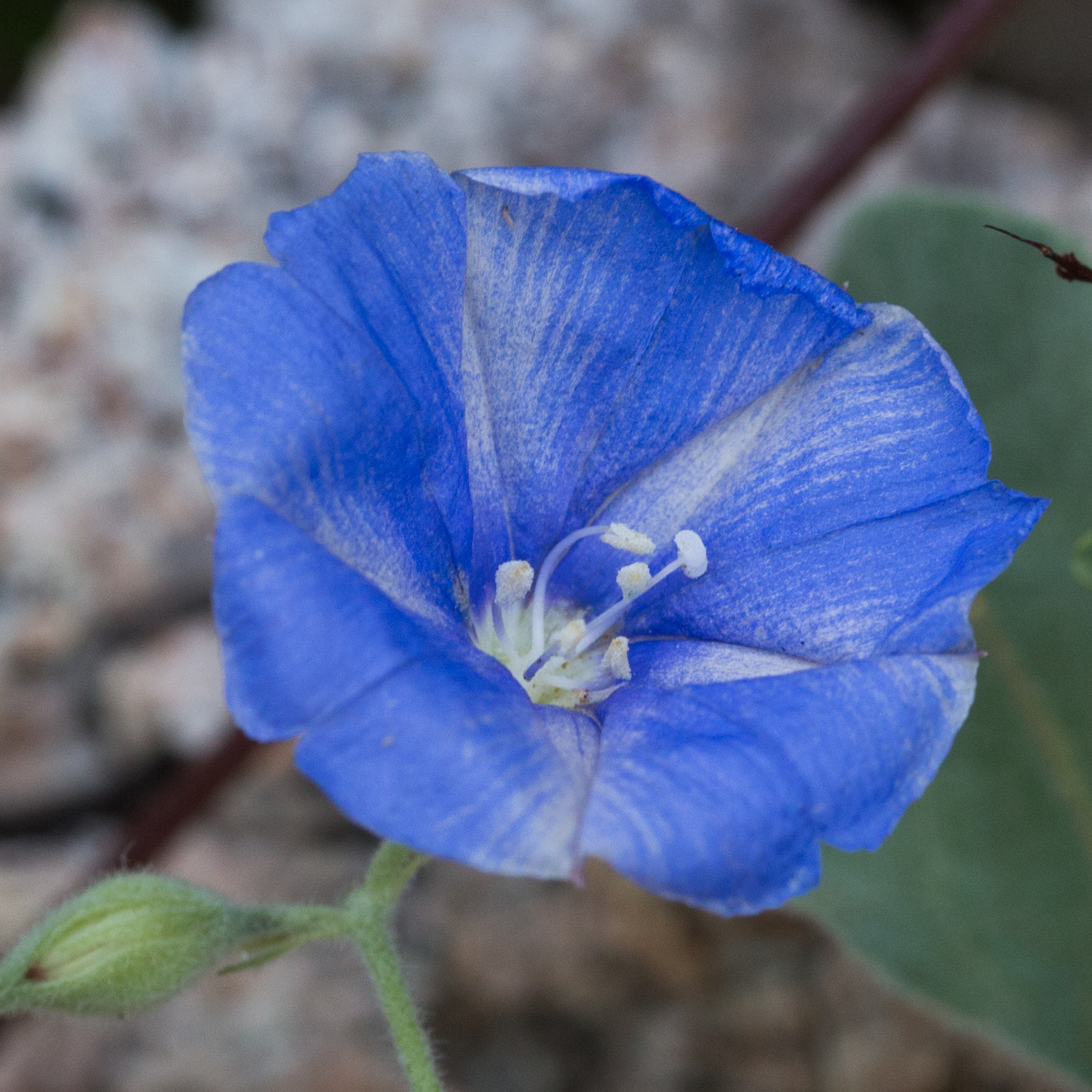
Detail of the flower

A perennial plant, this species has a woody base and may grow into a shrubby habit. The upper stems are vining, and are covered in moderately tomentose leaves. The leaves are petiolate, with the margins entire (the edges of the leaves are not serrated) and a cordate base. From September to June, the plant is in bloom. The flowers are blue to white and campanulate-rotate (shaped like a bell or a spreading like a wheel), with a very short corolla tube.

== Distribution and habitat ==
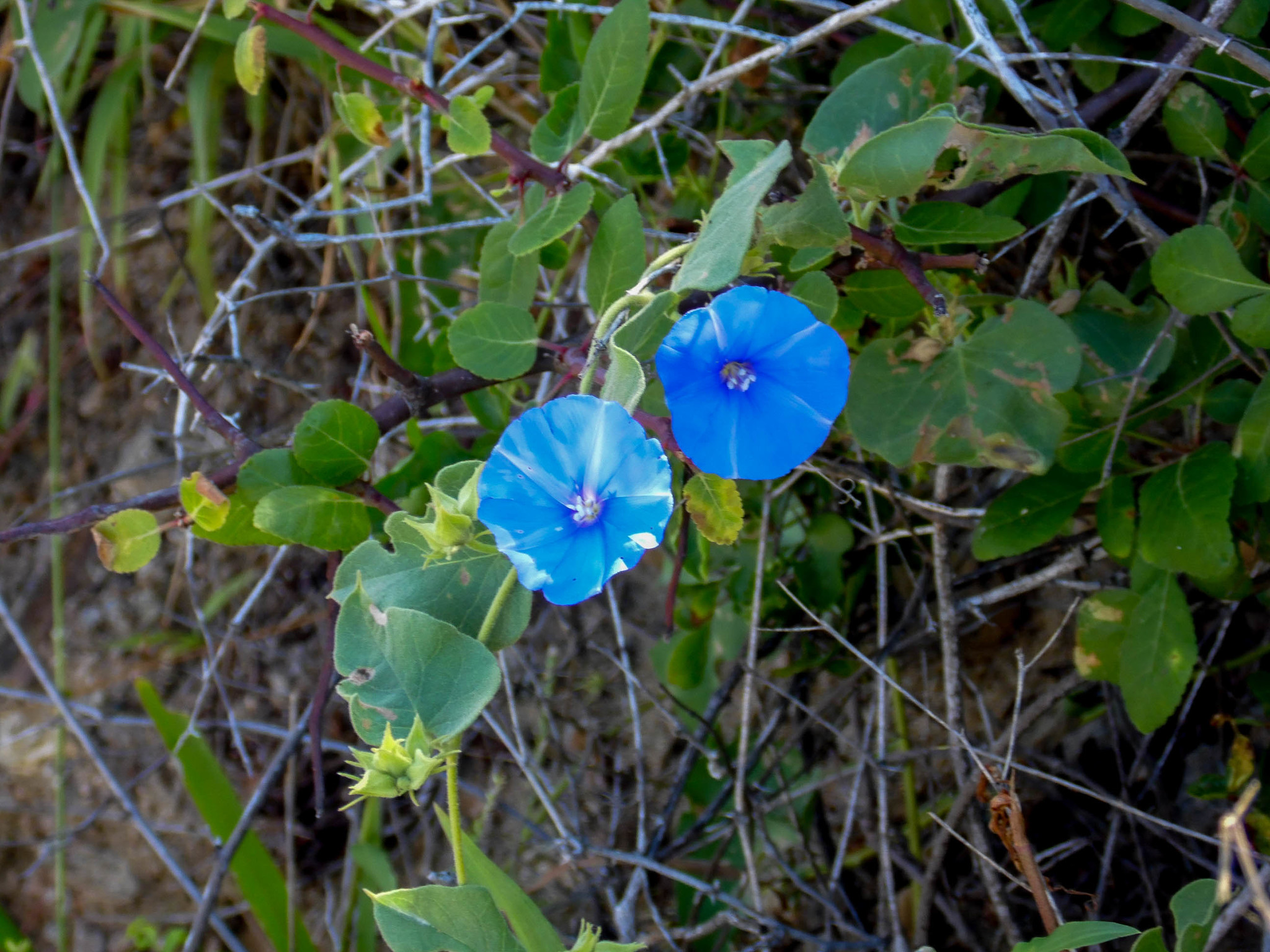
Flowering in habitat

Endemic to Mexico, this species is native to the states of Baja California, Baja California Sur, and Sonora. It occurs from the extreme southeast portion of Baja California state south to the Cape region of Baja California Sur. It is present on the Magdalena and Santa Margarita islands of the Pacific Coast of the Baja California peninsula, and it is also found on several Gulf of California islands, including Tiburon Island of Sonora.
