= Victor Jacquemont =

French botanist

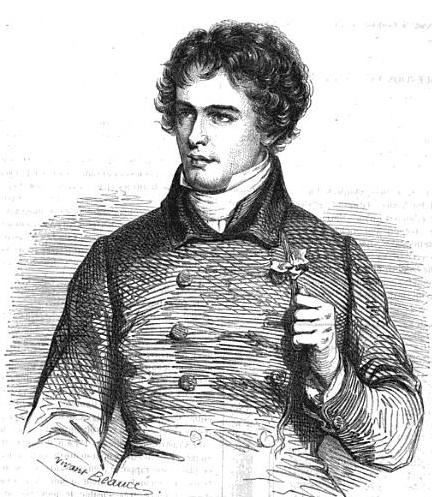
- Occupation(s): Botanist, Geologist.

Venceslas Victor Jacquemont (8 August 1801 – 7 December 1832) was a French botanist and geologist known for his travels in India.

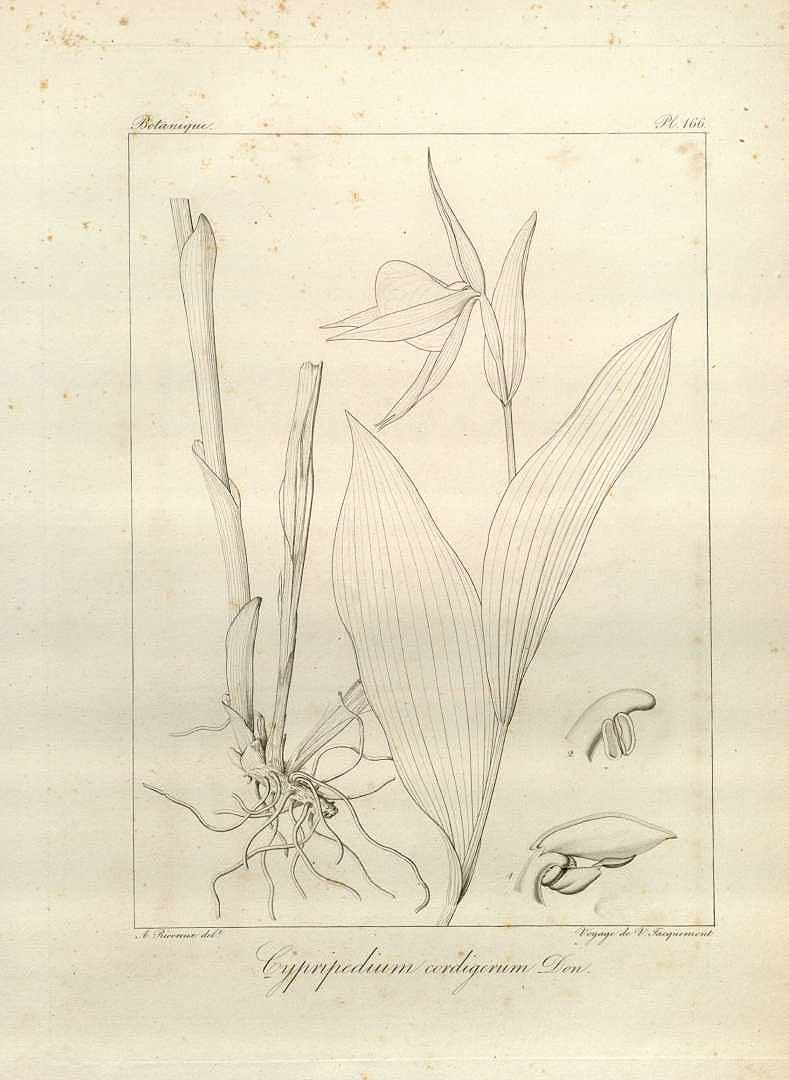

== Biography ==
Born in Paris on August 8, 1801, Victor Jacquemont was the youngest of four sons of Frédéric François Venceslas Jacquemont de Moreau (1757-1836) and Rose Laisné. He studied medicine and later took an interest in botany. His early travels took him around Europe. He was lightly built and capable of living on a very frugal diet.

After being invited by the Jardin des Plantes to collect plant and animal specimens from a country of his choice for 240 pounds a year, Jacquemont traveled to India leaving Brest in August 1828. He arrived at Calcutta on 5 May 1829. He went to Delhi on 5 March 1830 and went onwards towards the western Himalayas. He visited Amber in Rajputana, met with the Sikh Emperor Ranjit Singh at his capital of Lahore, and visited the kingdom of Ladakh in the Himalaya. He also visited Bardhaman (Burdwan) in Bengal in November 1829. In March 1831, he paid a visit to Lahore during the reign of Ranjit Singh of the Sikh Empire and met with the ruler.

He died of cholera in Bombay on 7 December 1832.

The standard author abbreviation Jacquem. is used to indicate this person as the author when citing a botanical name.

== Legacy ==
Several plants are named for him, including Jacquemontia pentanthos, Sky blue clustervine Vachellia jacquemontii, the Himalayan White Birch (Betula jacquemontii), the Indian Tree Hazel (Corylus jacquemontii), Afghan Cherry (Prunus jacquemontii), and the cobra lily or Jack in the pulpit (Arisaema jacquemontii).

== Selected publications ==
- Correspondance de Victor Jacquemont avec sa famille et plusieurs de ses amis: pendant son voyage dans l'Inde, 1828-1832. Paris: H. Fournier. 1833. édition belge. Bruxelles: A. Peeters. 1834.
  - Letters from India, 1829-1832; being a selection from the correspondence of Victor Jacquemont, trans. by Catherine Alison Phillips, John Sidney Lethbridge & K. G. Lethbridge. London: Macmillan. 1936.
- Voyage dans l'Inde par Victor Jacquemont, éd. François Guizot. Paris: Firmin Didot frères; 1841–1844. Jacquemont, Victor (1841). Tome I.
- Lettres à Stendhal par Victor Jacquemont, éd. Pierre Maes. Paris: A. Poursin & Cie. 1933.
- Lettres de Victor Jacquemont à Jean de Charpentier, 1822-1828, éd. Léon Bultingaire, Pierre Maes & Johann von Charpentier. Paris: E. Leroux. 1933.
- État politique et social de l'Inde du Sud en 1832 par Victor Jacquemont, éd. Alfred Martineau. Paris: Société de l'histoire des colonies françaises et E. Leroux. 1934.
- Letters to Achille Chaper; intimate sketches of life among Stendhal's coterie by Victor Jacquemont, trans. by John Freer Marshall. Philadelphia: American Philosophical Society. 1960.
