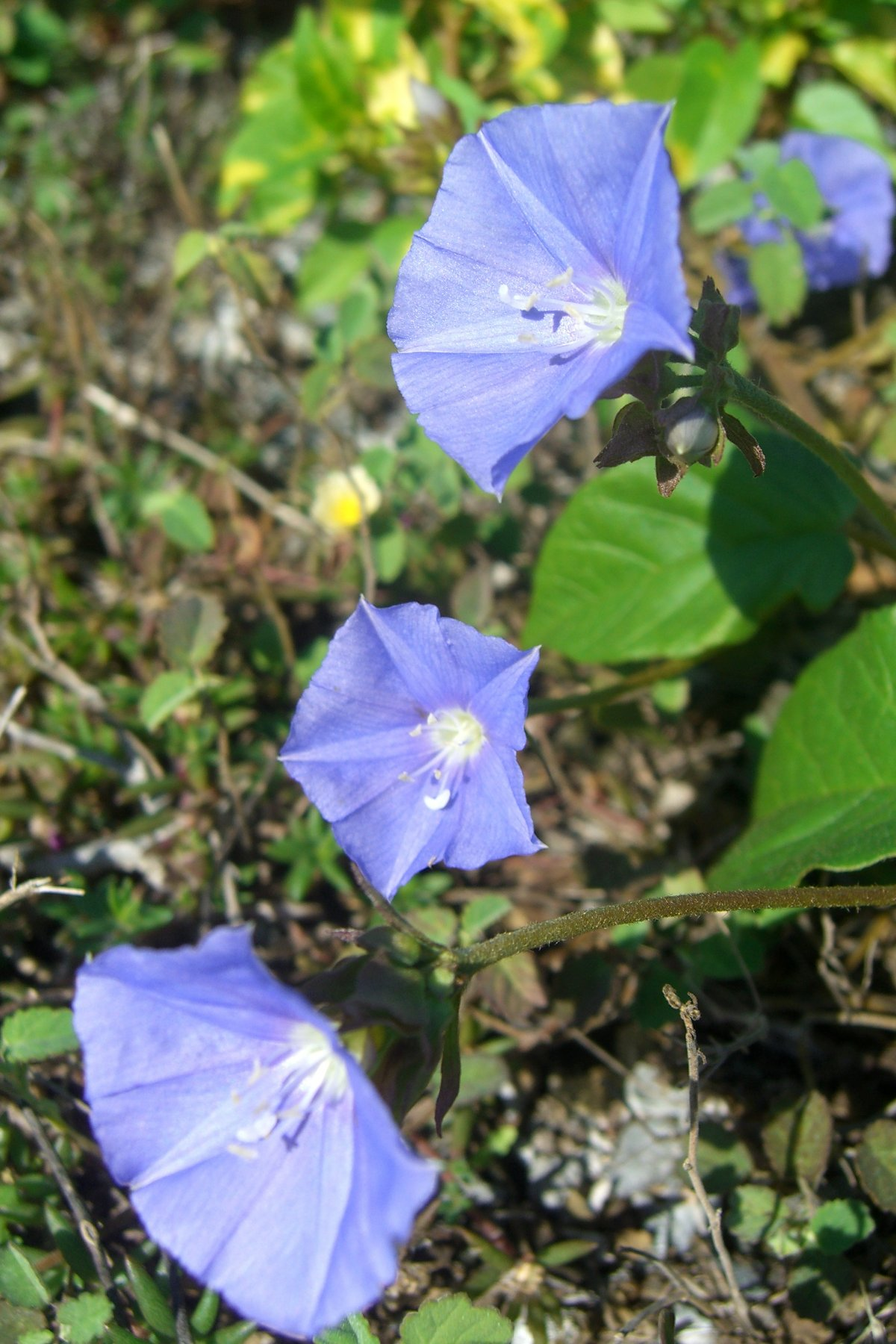

Scientific classification
- Kingdom: Plantae
- Clade: Tracheophytes
- Clade: Angiosperms
- Clade: Eudicots
- Clade: Asterids
- Order: Solanales
- Family: Convolvulaceae
- Genus: Jacquemontia
- Species: J. pentanthos

Binomial name
- Jacquemontia pentanthos (Jacq.) G.Don

= Jacquemontia pentanthos =

Species of flowering plant

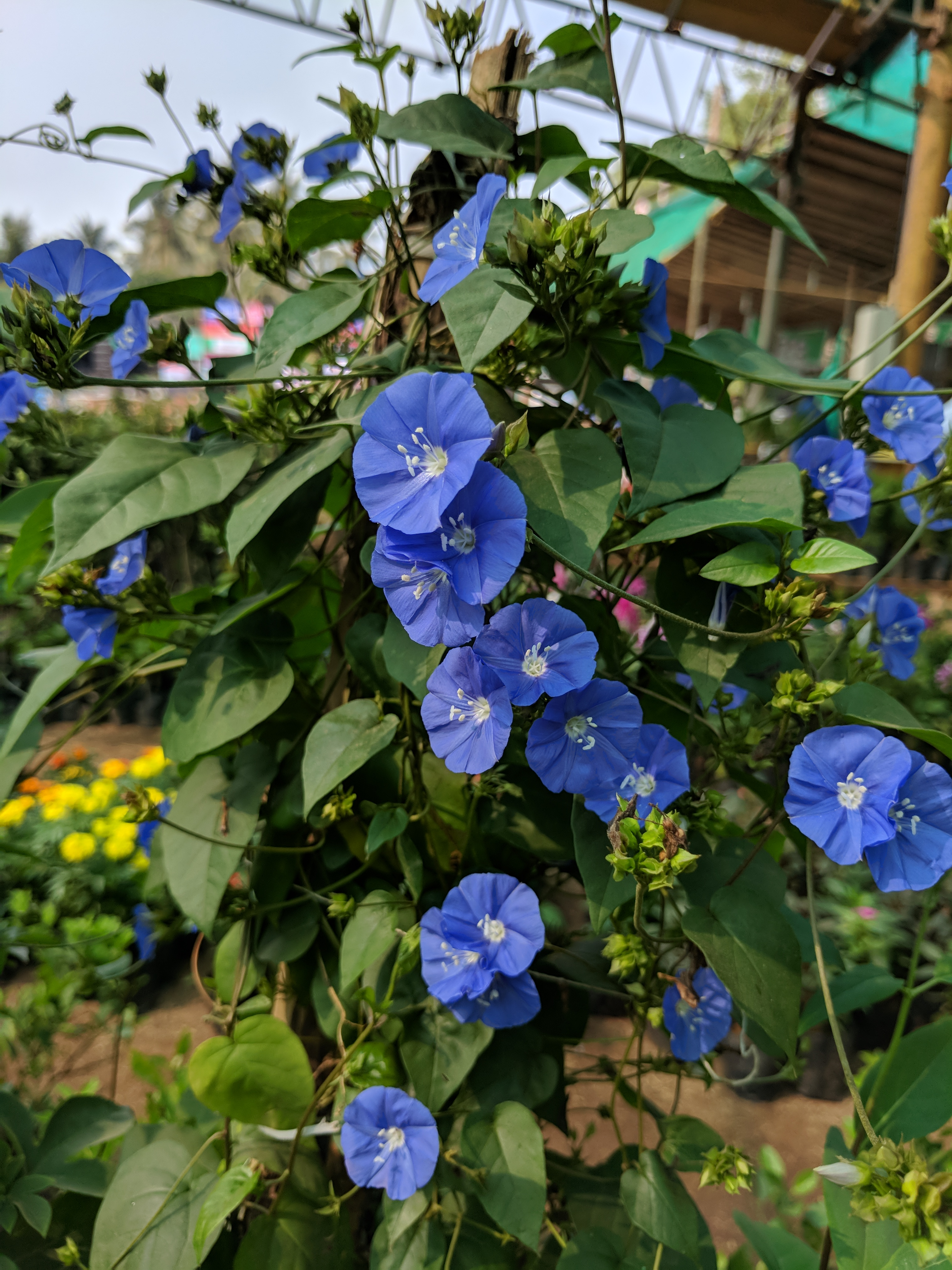

Jacquemontia pentanthos, also known as skyblue clustervine, is a flowering vine from the family Convolvulaceae. It grows in coastal hammock and dune areas. It is a perennial twining evergreen vine that flowers in fall and winter.

It is named by French botanist and geologist Victor Jacquemont (1801–1832) who traveled to India. Synonyms include Convolvulus pentanthos and Jacquemontia violacea.
