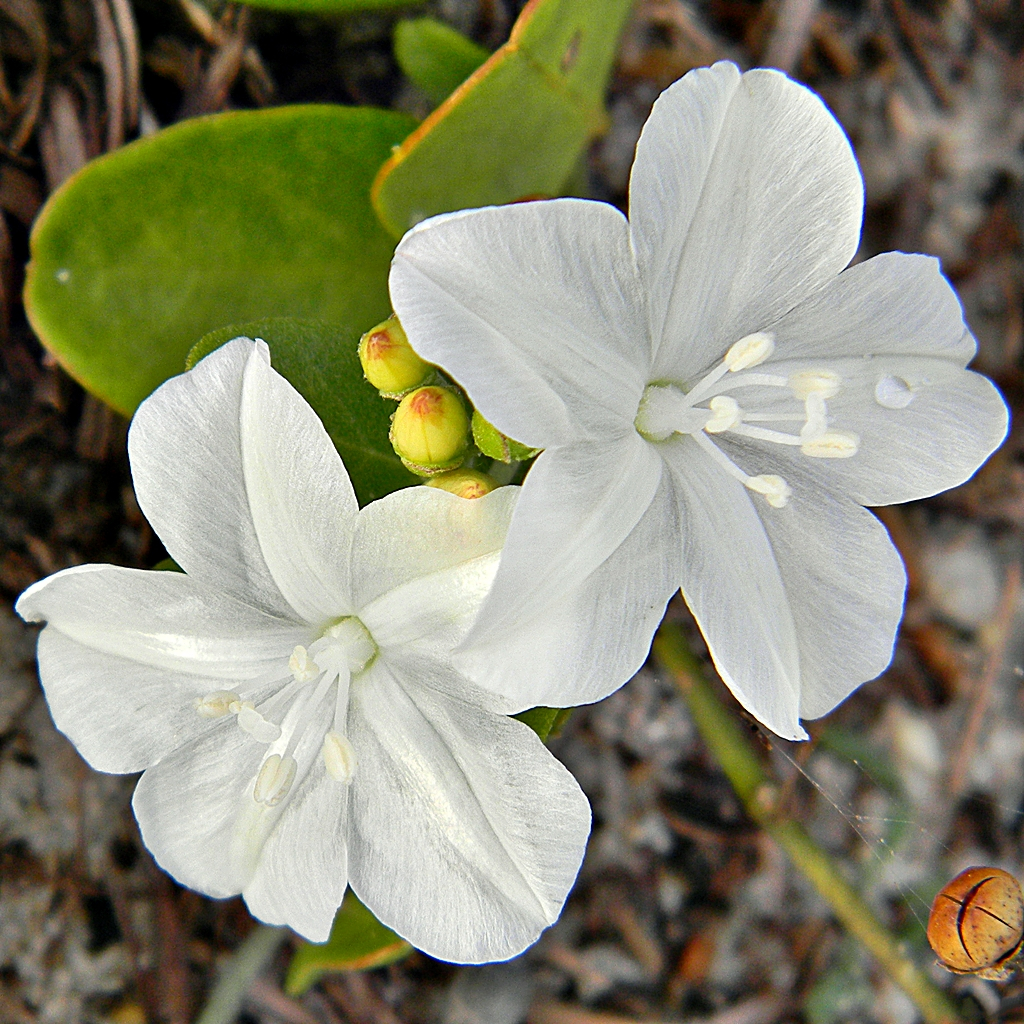
- Beach clustervine – Jacquemontia reclinata

Scientific classification
- Kingdom: Plantae
- Clade: Tracheophytes
- Clade: Angiosperms
- Clade: Eudicots
- Clade: Asterids
- Order: Solanales
- Family: Convolvulaceae
- Tribe: Convolvuleae
- Genus: Jacquemontia; Choisy

Species
- See text

Synonyms
- Montejacquia Roberty; Thyella Raf.

= Jacquemontia =

Genus of flowering plants

Jacquemontia is a genus of plants in the morning glory family Convolvulaceae. Species in this genus are commonly known as clustervine.

== Species ==
Over one hundred species are recognised:

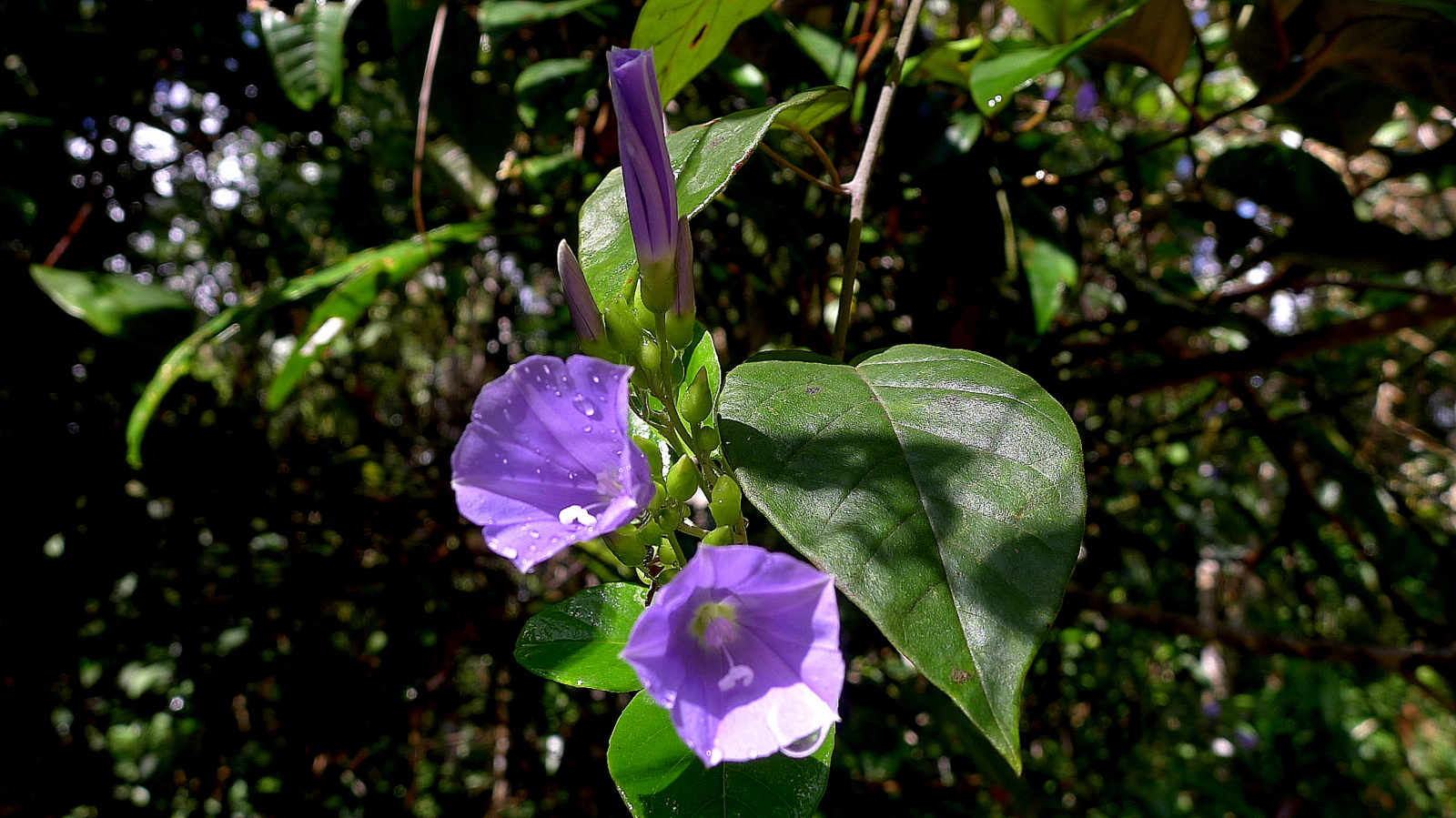
Jacquemontia glaucescens

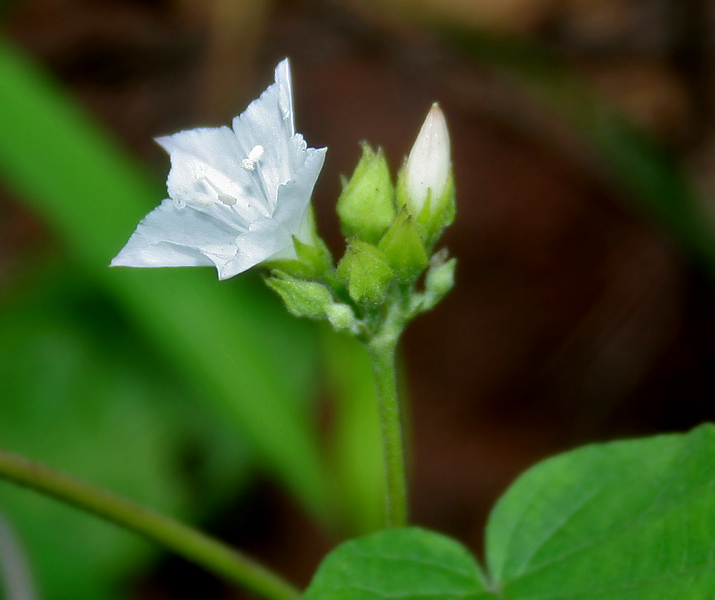
Jacquemontia paniculata

- Jacquemontia abutiloides Benth.
- Jacquemontia acrocephala Meisn.
- Jacquemontia acuminata Rusby
- Jacquemontia aequisepala M.Pastore & Sim.-Bianch.
- Jacquemontia albida Wiggins & Rollins
- Jacquemontia anomala O'Donell
- Jacquemontia asarifolia L.B.Sm.
- Jacquemontia bahiensis O'Donell
- Jacquemontia blanchetii Moric.
- Jacquemontia bracteosa Meisn.
- Jacquemontia browniana Ooststr.
- Jacquemontia capitellata Choisy
- Jacquemontia cataractae Krapov.
- Jacquemontia caudata Helwig
- Jacquemontia cayensis Britton
- Jacquemontia cearensis Huber
- Jacquemontia cephalantha Hallier f.
- Jacquemontia chrysanthera Buril
- Jacquemontia confusa Meisn.
- Jacquemontia corymbulosa Benth.
- Jacquemontia cumanensis Kuntze
- Jacquemontia curtissii Peter ex Hallier f.
- Jacquemontia cuyabana Hoehne
- Jacquemontia decipiens Ooststr.
- Jacquemontia densiflora (Meisn.) Hallier f.
- Jacquemontia densifolia (Chodat & Hassl.) Hassl.
- Jacquemontia diamantinensis Buril
- Jacquemontia eastwoodiana I.M.Johnst.
- Jacquemontia ekmanii O'Donell
- Jacquemontia elegans Helwig
- Jacquemontia estrellensis Krapov.
- Jacquemontia evolvuloides Meisn.
- Jacquemontia ferruginea Choisy
- Jacquemontia floribunda (Kunth) Hallier f.
- Jacquemontia frankeana (Schltdl.) M.Pastore & Sim.-Bianch.
- Jacquemontia fruticulosa Hallier f.
- Jacquemontia fusca Hallier
- Jacquemontia gabrielii (Choisy) Buril
- Jacquemontia glabrescens (Meisn.) M.Pastore & Sim.-Bianch.
- Jacquemontia glaucescens Choisy
- Jacquemontia gracilis Choisy
- Jacquemontia gracillima (Choisy) Hallier f.
- Jacquemontia grisea Buril
- Jacquemontia guaranitica Hassl.
- Jacquemontia guyanensis (Aubl.) Meisn.
- Jacquemontia havanensis (Jacq.) Urb.
- Jacquemontia heterantha (Nees & Mart.) Hallier f.
- Jacquemontia heterotricha O'Donell
- Jacquemontia holosericea (Weinm.) O'Donell
- Jacquemontia itatiayensis (Kuntze) K.Schum.
- Jacquemontia lasioclados (Choisy) O'Donell
- Jacquemontia linarioides Meisn.
- Jacquemontia linoides Meisn.
- Jacquemontia lorentzii (Kuntze) Peter ex O'Donell
- Jacquemontia macrocalyx Buril
- Jacquemontia martii Meisn.
- Jacquemontia mexicana (Loes.) Standl. & Steyerm.
- Jacquemontia mucronifera Hallier
- Jacquemontia multiflora Haller f
- Jacquemontia nipensis Alain
- Jacquemontia nodiflora (Desr.) G.Don
- Jacquemontia oaxacana (Meisn.) Hallier f.
- Jacquemontia obcordata (Millsp.) House
- Jacquemontia ochracea Sim.-Bianch. & Pirani
- Jacquemontia ovalifolia (Choisy) Hallier f.
- Jacquemontia paniculata (Burm.f.) Hallier f.
- Jacquemontia pannosa (R.Br.) Mabb.
- Jacquemontia paraguayensis Britton
- Jacquemontia parviflora Choisy
- Jacquemontia parvifolia Helwig
- Jacquemontia pentanthos (Jacq.) G.Don
- Jacquemontia peruviana Helwig
- Jacquemontia pinetorum Standl. & Steyerm.
- Jacquemontia polyantha (Schltdl. & Cham.) Hallier f.
- Jacquemontia pringlei A.Gray
- Jacquemontia prostrata Choisy
- Jacquemontia pycnocephala Benth.
- Jacquemontia reclinata House ex Small
- Jacquemontia revoluta Sim.-Bianch.
- Jacquemontia robertsoniana Buril & Sim.-Bianch.
- Jacquemontia rojasiana O'Donell
- Jacquemontia rufa Dammer
- Jacquemontia rusbyana Standl.
- Jacquemontia sandwicensis A.Gray
- Jacquemontia saxicola L.B.Sm.
- Jacquemontia selloi Hallier
- Jacquemontia serpyllifolia (Kunth) Urb.
- Jacquemontia solanifolia (L.) Hallier f.
- Jacquemontia sphaerocephala Meisn.
- Jacquemontia sphaerostigma (Cav.) Rusby
- Jacquemontia spiciflora (Choisy) Hallier f.
- Jacquemontia staplesii Buril
- Jacquemontia subsessilis Moric.
- Jacquemontia tamnifolia (L.) Griseb.
- Jacquemontia tomentella (Miq.) Hallier f.
- Jacquemontia tuerckheimii Urb.
- Jacquemontia turneroides Hassl.
- Jacquemontia unilateralis (Roem. & Schult.) O'Donell
- Jacquemontia velloziana (Mart.) O'Donell
- Jacquemontia velutina Choisy
- Jacquemontia verticillata (L.) Urb.
- Jacquemontia villosissima Ooststr.
- Jacquemontia warmingii O'Donell
- Jacquemontia weberbaueri Helwing
- Jacquemontia zollingeri (Choisy) Hallier f.
