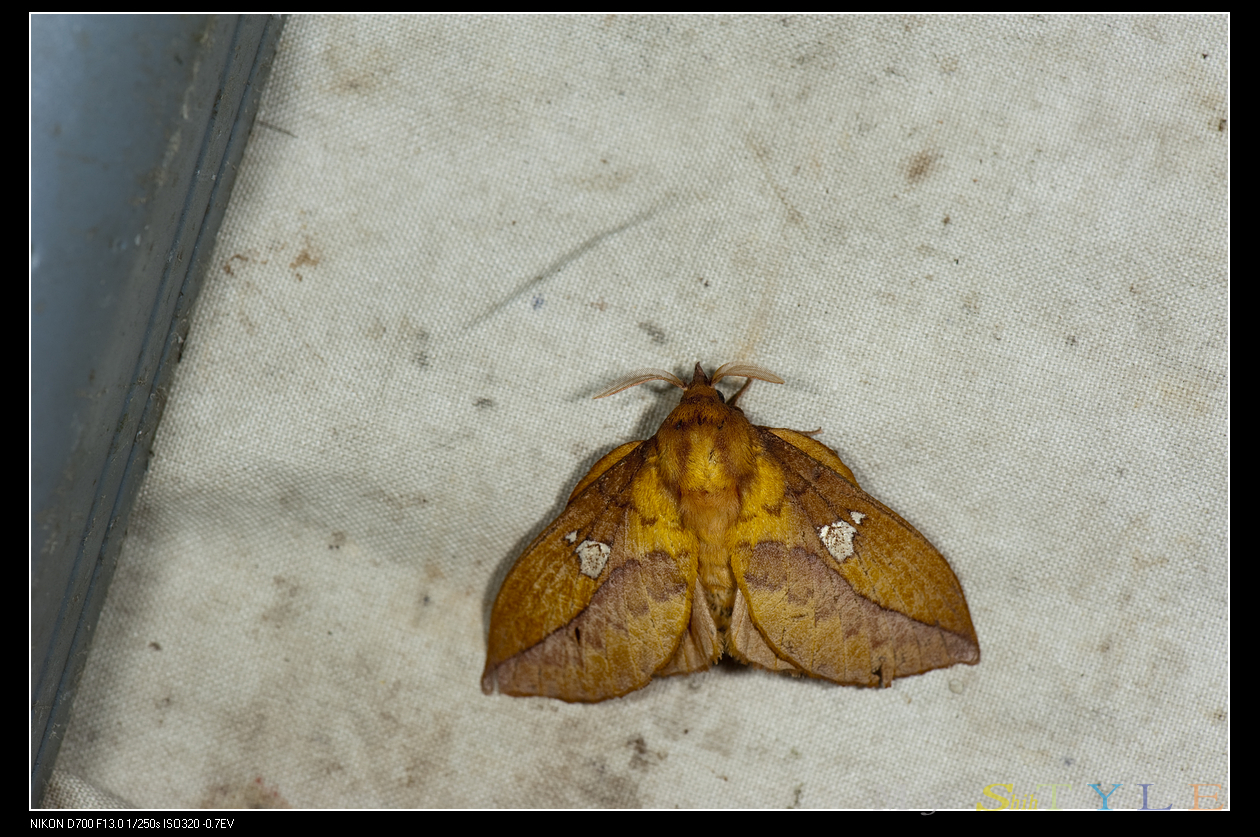

Scientific classification
- Kingdom: Animalia
- Phylum: Arthropoda
- Class: Insecta
- Order: Lepidoptera
- Family: Lasiocampidae
- Genus: Euthrix
- Species: E. laeta

Binomial name
- Euthrix laeta (Walker, 1855)

Synonyms
- Amydona laeta Walker, 1855; Philudoria laeta Walker; Lajonquière, 1978; Cosmotriche purpurascensHampson, 1893

= Euthrix laeta =

Species of moth

Euthrix laeta is a moth of the family Lasiocampidae first described by Francis Walker in 1855.

== Distribution ==
It is found in South Asian countries like India, Sri Lanka, Nepal, Pakistan and Bangladesh towards Russian Far East of China, Siberia, Japan, Korea to South East Asian Sundaland.

== Taxonomy ==
The systematics of the species has been considered taxonomically stable since a revision by Yves de Lajonquière (1977). However, by J. W. Tutt, 1902 it was accepted as a member of its own subgenus, Routlegdia, and then erroneously as the Orienthrix by Yuri A. Tschistjakov in 1998.

== Description ==
Forewings are leaf like with an oblique postmedial yellow patch on the dorsal surface sometimes with a violet saturation. The caterpillar is known to feed on Dalbergia species. Adults are found from rainforest and coastal associations. Male has a wingspan of 33–55 mm and 50–70 mm in females. Female is much larger and more robust than the male. Antennae bipectinate (comb like on both sides) in both sexes, whereas the female has shorter rami. Body color is bright lilac reddish. Subspecies divisa in Sri Lanka is much darker. Hindwings are lightly divided with darker zones.

Body of the caterpillar is brown to ash gray. There are black and gray speckles dorsally. The white to yellow colored spots and streaks grouped to form a complete marble pattern. Mesothorax bears a dorso-median line of black setae. The caterpillar is known to feed on Lespedeza and Dalbergia species.

== Subspecies ==
Five subspecies are recognized, along with new subspecies.

Subspecies	Distribution	Wingspan	Larval food plants
Euthrix laeta arina Zolotuhin & Perekrasnov, 1894	Taiwan	45–55 mm in male and 60–64 mm in female	Bambusa and Phragmites possible
Euthrix laeta austrina de Lajonquière, 1978	Sumatra, Borneo	33–46 mm in male and 50–58 mm female	
Euthrix laeta divisa Moore, 1879	Sri Lanka, southern India	45–50 mm in male and 52–65 mm in female	
Euthrix laeta laeta Walker, 1855	Northern India, Pakistan, Nepal, Bangladesh	50–55 mm in male and 60–63 mm in female	Dalbergia latifolia and Dalbergia sissoo.
Euthrix laeta sulphurea Aurivillius, 1894	Russia, Korea, China, Japan (Tsushima), Myanmar, Laos, Thailand, Vietnam	50–53 mm in males and 67–70 mm in female	Lespedeza bicolor and Dalbergia
