= C15H10O2 =

The molecular formula C_{15}H_{10}O_{2} (molar mass : 222.23 g/mol, exact mass : 222.06807954) may refer to:

- Aurone
- Flavone
- 2-Methylanthraquinone
- Phenindione
- 3-Phenylcoumarin
- 3-Phenylchromen-4-one, the backbone of isoflavonoids
