= Tamanu oil =

Oil from the seeds of tamanu plants

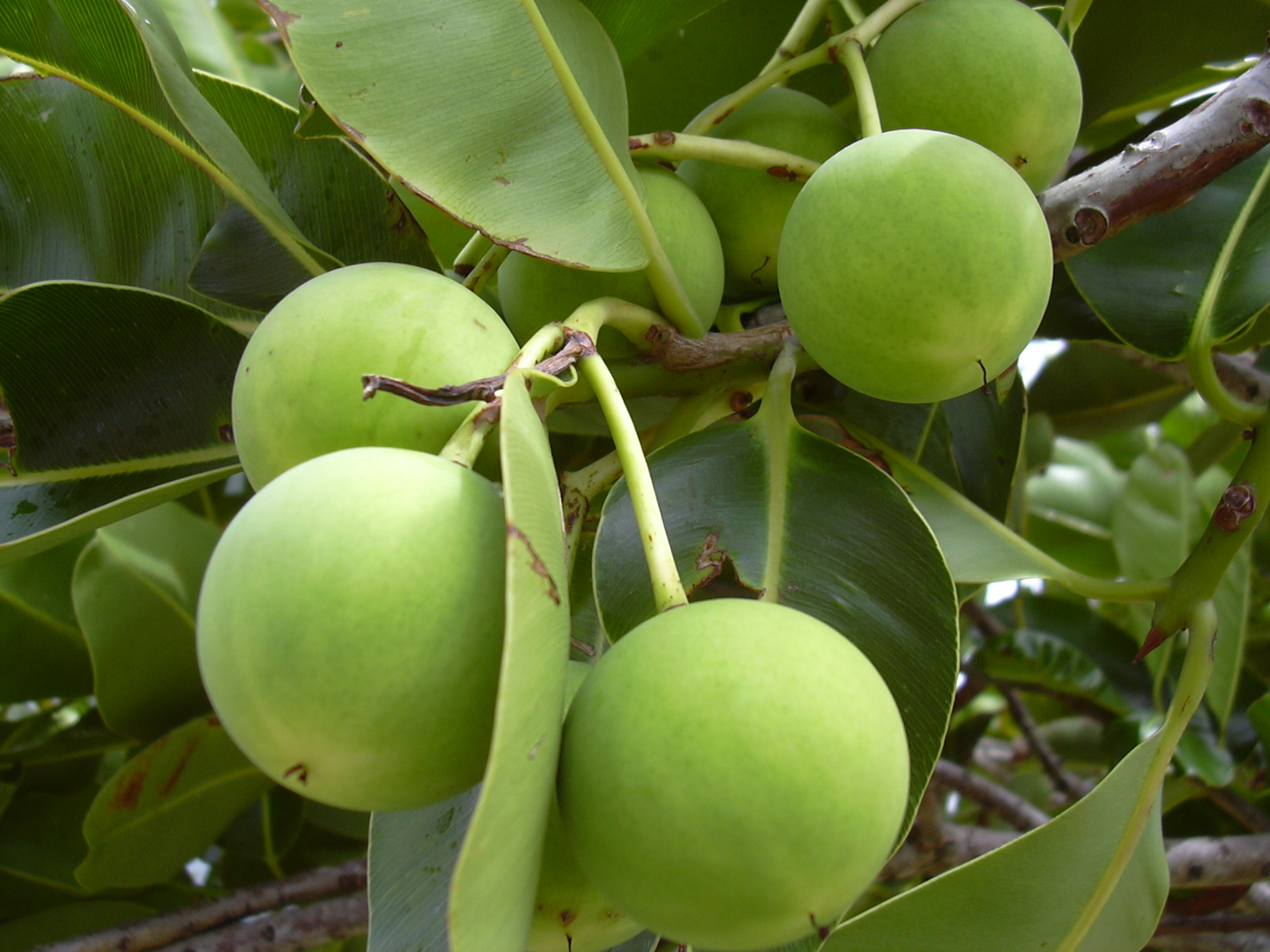
The fruit of the tamanu tree

Tamanu oil is pressed from nuts of either Calophyllum inophyllum (usually) or Calophyllum tacamahaca (ati), tropical trees belonging to the Calophyllaceae family. The oil originates in Polynesia, where it continues to play an important cultural role.

Commercial uses of tamanu oil are predominantly for skin care. The oil has value and use as a fuel. Calophyllum inophyllum oil (CIO) is rich in antioxidants and contains UV-absorption properties.

== Other names ==
It is also called beauty leaf oil, calophyllum inophyllum seed oil, calophyllum inophyllum oil,"Da'ok", kamani oil, calophyllum oil, dilo oil, foraha oil, Alexandrian laurel oil, poon oil, nyamplung oil, domba oil, honne oil (Honge is used as biodiesel), undi oil, pinnai oil, fetau oil, punnai oil, daok oil, pinnay oil, kamanu oil, bitaog oil, tamanu nut oil, punna oil, takamaka oil (ambiguous), laurelwood oil (ambiguous), tacamahac oil (ambiguous), punnaga oil, fetaʻu oil, palo maria oil, ballnut tree oil, ballnut oil, btaches oil, beach calophyllum oil, or mù u oil.

== Production ==
=== Harvest of fruits ===
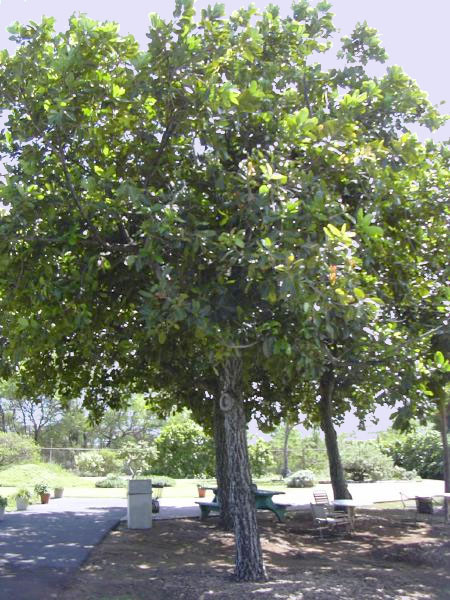
Tree

Fruiting takes place twice a year, in May and November. When ripe, the fruit is wrinkled and its color varies from yellow to brownish-red. Ripe and fallen fruits are collected from the bottom of the tree, by beating the limbs with a long hand stick, or hand-picked by climbing the tree.

A tamanu fruit produces a single large seed. The seed consists of a kernel 1.5 cm in diameter and enclosed in a soft- and a hard seed coat. It is 43–52% of the weight of the whole dry fruit, about 4 g. Fresh kernels contain 55–73% oil and 25% moisture; the oil content increases to 70–75% when dry.

=== Seed processing and extraction ===
The seeds are decorticated by wooden mallets or by decorticators or by pressing under planks. Usually, the kernels are pressed in wooden and stone ghani.

== Uses ==
The first neoflavone isolated in 1951 from natural sources was calophyllolide from C. inophyllum seeds.

The fatty acid methyl esters derived from C. inophyllum seed oil meet the major biodiesel requirements in the United States (ASTM D 6751), and European Union (EN 14214). The average oil yield is 11.7 kg-oil/tree or 4680 kg-oil/hectare. In the northwest coastal areas of Luzon island in the Philippines, the oil was used for night lamps. This widespread use started to decline when kerosene, and later electricity, became available. It was also used as fuel to generate electricity to power radios during World War II. A farmer in Nagappattinam district of Tamil Nadu, India, has successfully used the oil as biodiesel to run his 5-hp pumpset.

In Southern India, the oil may have been useful in waterproofing cloth and is used as a varnish. An extract from the fruit was once used to make a brown dye to colour cloth. The oil can also be used to make soap.

== Properties and fatty acids ==
The oil is bluish-yellow to dark green and very viscous. It has a disagreeable taste and odour as it contains some resinous material that can easily be removed by refining. The concentration of resinous substances in the oil varies from 10 to 30%. The main compounds of the seed oil are oleic-, linoleic-, stearic- and palmitic acids.

Physical characteristics

physical character	Range
Refractive index 30 °C	1.460-1.470
Iodine value	79-98
Saponification value	190-205
Unsaponifiable matter	1.5%, maximum
Acid value	20-40
Moisture	0.5%, maximum

Fatty acids present in oil

Fatty acid	Percentage
Palmitic acid	14.8-18.5
Stearic acid	6.0-9.0
Oleic acid	36-53
Linoleic acid	16-29
Erucic acid	2.5-3.5

Another source says the oil contains the following fatty acids:

Fatty acid	Content
Linoleic acid	38%
Oleic acid	34%
Stearic acid	13%
Palmitic acid	12%

Other components include calophyllolide, friedelin, inophyllums B and P, terpenic essences, benzoic and oxibenzoic acids, phospho-amino lipids, glycerides, saturated fatty acids, and 4-phenylcoumarins.
