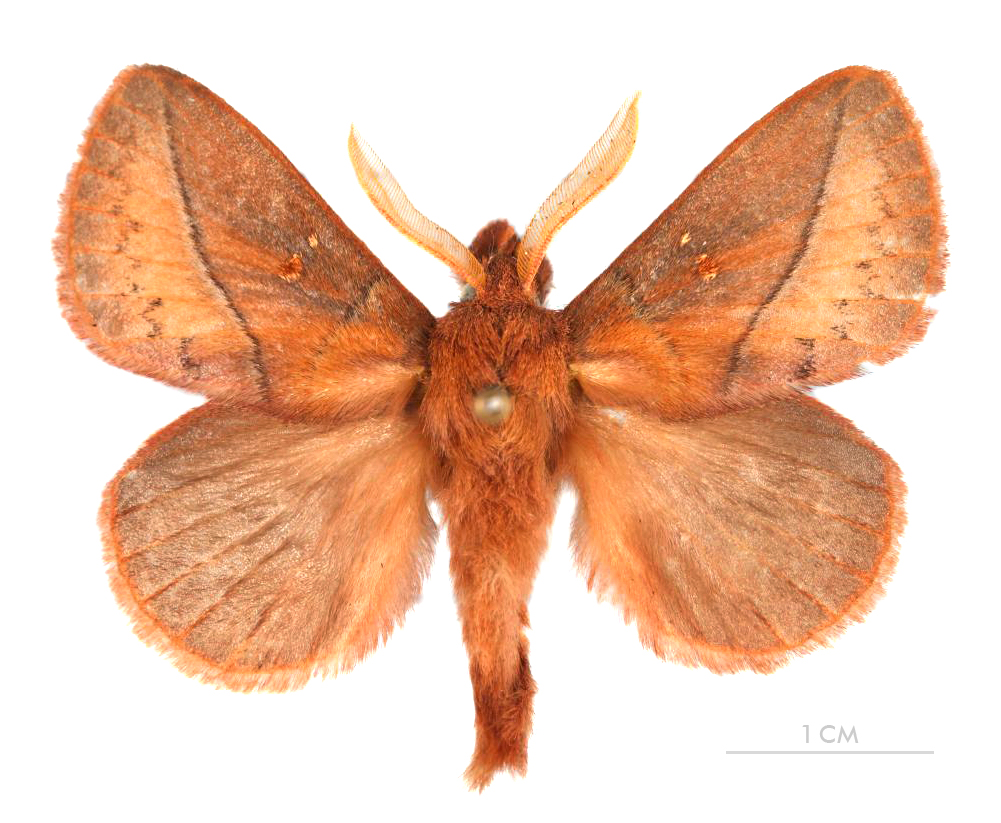

Scientific classification
- Domain: Eukaryota
- Kingdom: Animalia
- Phylum: Arthropoda
- Class: Insecta
- Order: Lepidoptera
- Family: Lasiocampidae
- Genus: Euthrix
- Species: E. tamahonis

Binomial name
- Euthrix tamahonis (Matsumura, 1927)

Synonyms
- Cosmotriche tamahonis Matsumura, 1927

= Euthrix tamahonis =

Species of moth

Euthrix tamahonis is a moth in the family Lasiocampidae. It is found in Taiwan.
