= Dalbergichromene =

Names
- IUPAC name 7-Methoxyneoflav-3-en-6-ol
- Systematic IUPAC name 7-Methoxy-4-phenyl-2H-1-benzopyran-6-ol
- Other names 7-Methoxy-4-phenyl-2H-chromen-6-ol

Identifiers
CAS Number	32066-31-2
3D model (JSmol)	Interactive image
ChemSpider	4475375
PubChem CID	5316291
CompTox Dashboard (EPA)	DTXSID50415701
- InChI: InChI=1S/C16H14O3/c1-18-16-10-15-13(9-14(16)17)12(7-8-19-15)11-5-3-2-4-6-11/h2-7,9-10,17H,8H2,1H3 Key: WZIKSEWGSSYQHA-UHFFFAOYSA-N
- SMILES: COC1=C(C=C2C(=CCOC2=C1)C3=CC=CC=C3)O

Properties
Chemical formula	C_{16}H_{14}O_{3}
Molar mass	254.285 g·mol^{−1}
- Except where otherwise noted, data are given for materials in their standard state (at 25 °C [77 °F], 100 kPa). verify (what is ?) Infobox references

Dalbergichromene is a neoflavene, a type of neoflavonoid (a polyphenolic compound). Dalbergichromene can be extracted from the stem-bark and heartwood of Dalbergia sissoo. It has also been synthesized from vanillin.
