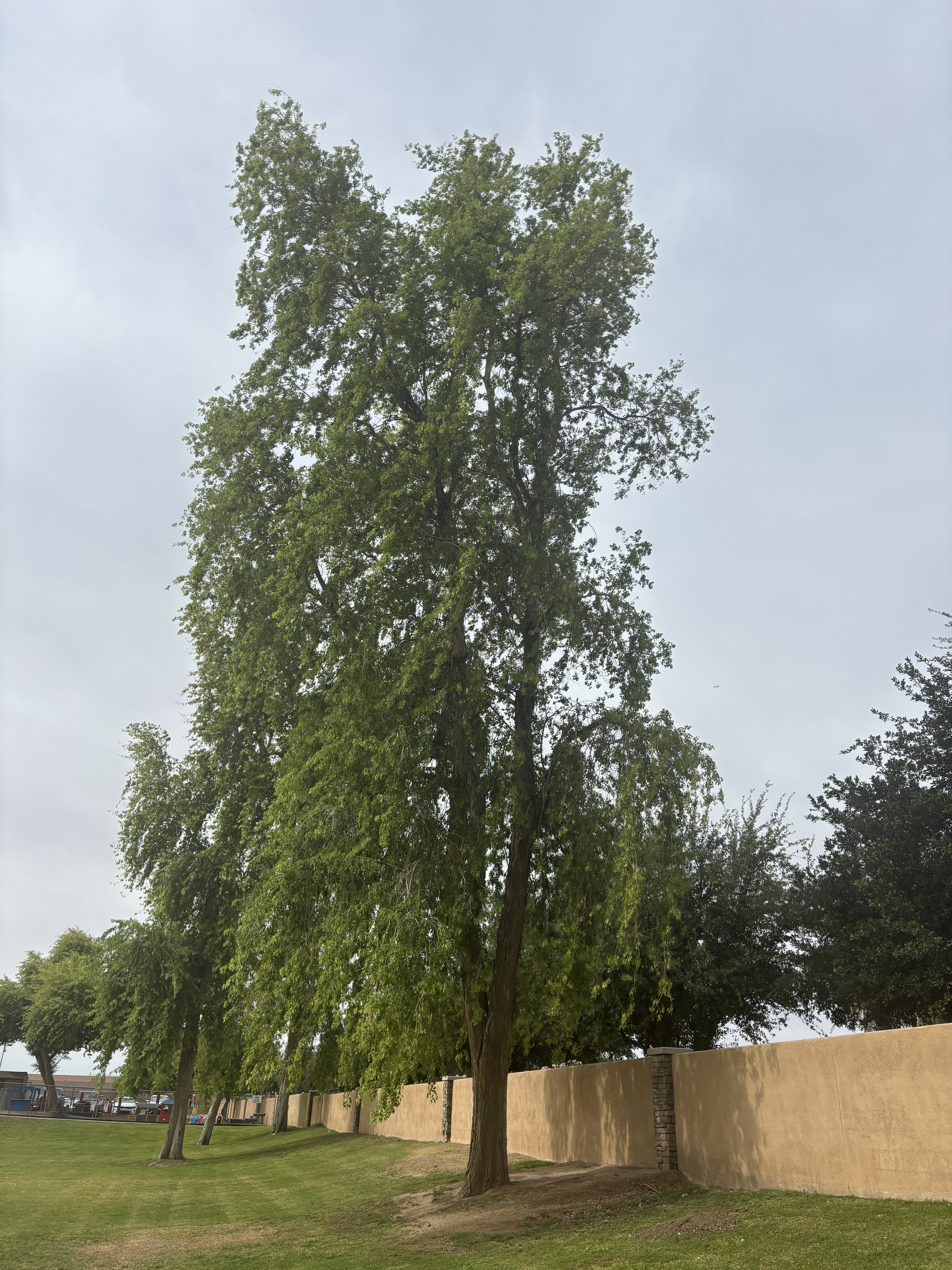
- Mature tree in Arizona

Conservation status
- Least Concern (IUCN 3.1)

Scientific classification
- Kingdom: Plantae
- Clade: Tracheophytes
- Clade: Angiosperms
- Clade: Eudicots
- Clade: Rosids
- Order: Fabales
- Family: Fabaceae
- Subfamily: Faboideae
- Genus: Dalbergia
- Species: D. sissoo

Binomial name
- Dalbergia sissoo Roxb.

Synonyms
- Amerimnon sissoo (Roxb.) Kuntze

= Dalbergia sissoo =

Species of deciduous tree

Dalbergia sissoo, known commonly as North Indian rosewood or shisham, is a fast-growing, hardy, deciduous rosewood tree native to the Indian subcontinent and southern Iran. D. sissoo is a large, crooked tree with long, leathery leaves and whitish or pink flowers.

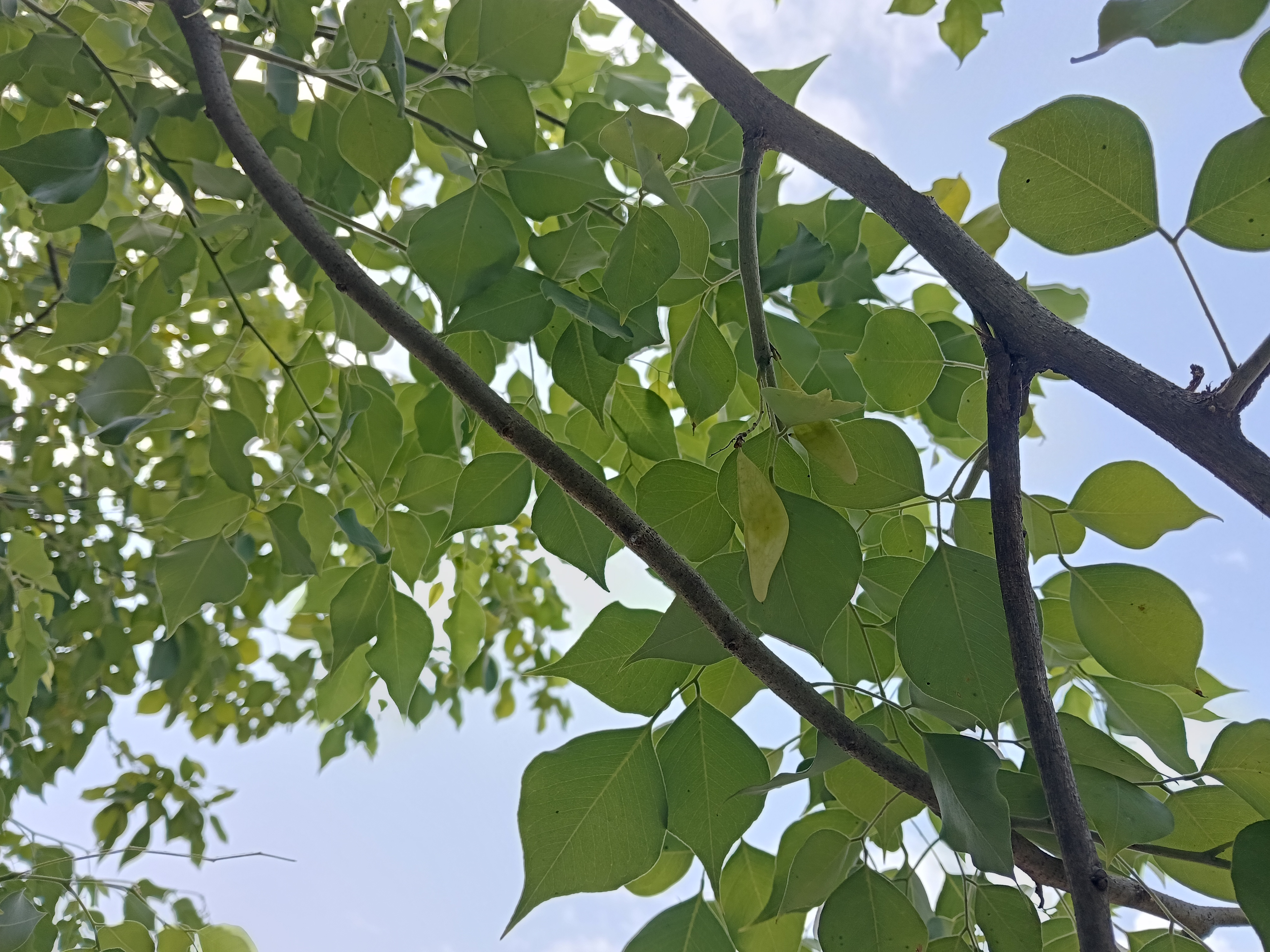
View of leaves and thin fruits of a shisham tree at Turbhe area in Navi Mumbai.

== Description ==
Dalbergia sissoo is a medium to large deciduous tree with a light crown, which reproduces by seeds and suckers. It can grow up to 25 m (82 ft) in height and 2 to 3 m (6 ft 7 in to 9 ft 10 in) in diameter, but is usually smaller. Trunks are often crooked when grown in the open. Leaves are leathery, alternate, pinnately compound, and about 15 cm (5.9 in) long. Flowers are whitish to pink, fragrant, nearly sessile, up to 1.5 cm (0.59 in) long, and in dense clusters 5 to 10 cm (2.0 to 3.9 in) in length. Pods are oblong, flat, thin, strap-like, 4 to 8 cm (1.6 to 3.1 in) long, 1 cm (0.39 in) wide, and light brown. They contain one to five flat, bean-shaped seeds, 8 to 10 mm (0.31 to 0.39 in) long. They have a long taproot and numerous surface roots that produce suckers. Young shoots are downy and drooping; established stems have light brown to dark gray bark, up to 2.5 cm (0.98 in) thick, shed in narrow strips; large upper branches support a spreading crown.

== Distribution and habitat ==
Dalbergia sissoo is native to the foothills of the Himalayas ranging from Afghanistan in the west to Bihar, India, in the east. It also occurs naturally in Iran. It is primarily found growing along river banks above 200 m (700 ft) elevation, but can range naturally up to 1,400 m (4,600 ft). The temperature in its native range is typically 10 to 40 °C (50 to 104 °F), but varies from just below freezing to nearly 50 °C (122 °F). It can withstand average annual rainfall up to 2,000 millimetres (79 in) and droughts of three to four months. Soils range from pure sand and gravel to rich alluvium of river banks; shisham can grow in slightly saline soils. Seedlings are intolerant of shade.

== Ecology ==
Dalbergia sissoo is the larval food plant of the black rajah butterfly (Charaxes solon).

== Uses ==
=== Timber ===
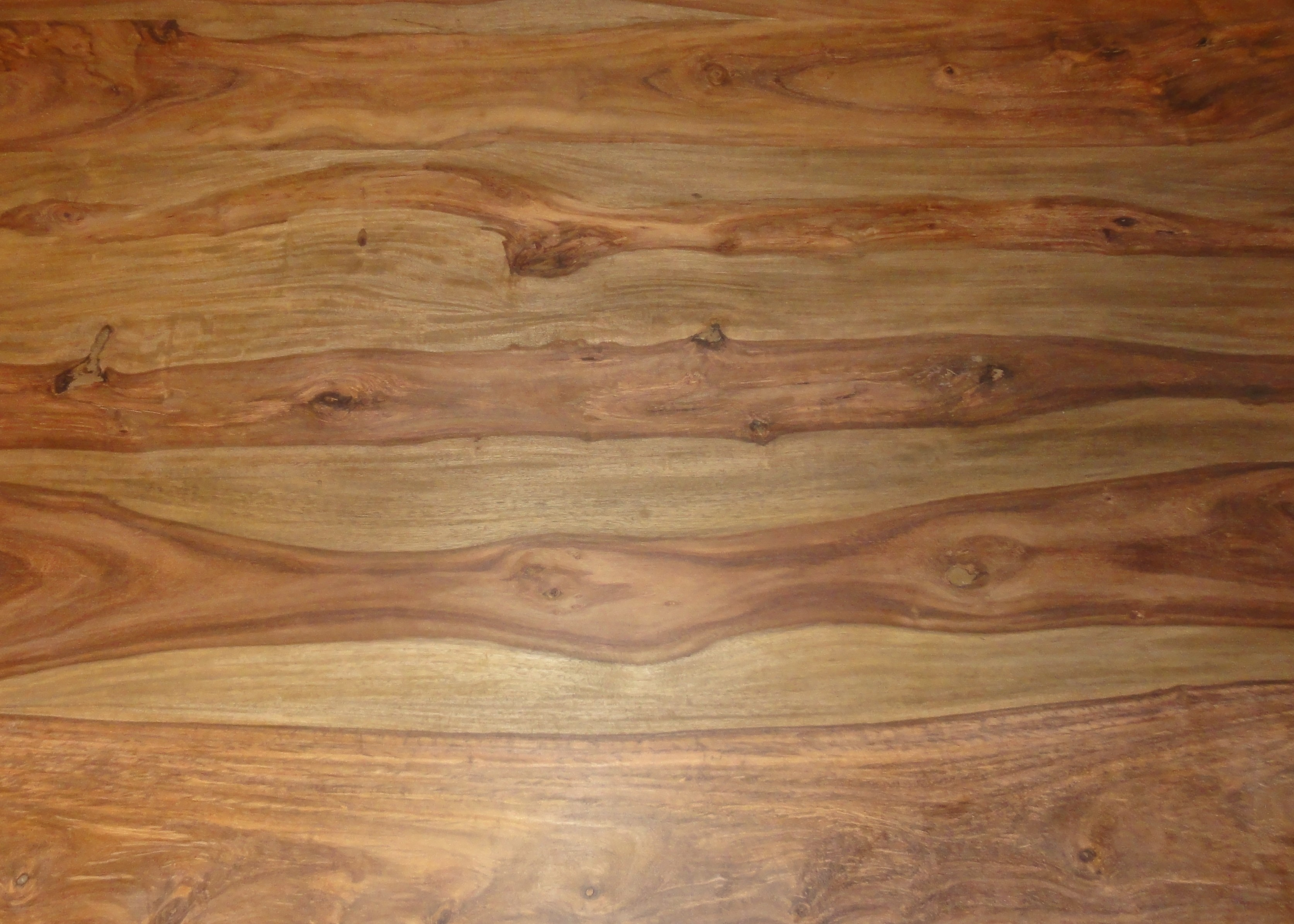
Sheesham wood

It is the best known economic timber species of the rosewood genus sold internationally, but it is also used as fuel wood and for shade and shelter. After teak, it is the most important cultivated timber tree of Bihar, which is the largest producer of shisham timber in India.

North Indian rosewood is usually dried before being used in furniture manufacturing, a process commonly known as seasoning. Locally, it is left in open areas to dry under the sun for about six months. Commercially, it is dried in closed chambers with hot-air circulation for about 7 to 15 days, depending on weather conditions. The ideal moisture level is around 5 to 6% for thinner pieces and up to 11% for thicker ones, depending on use. Any level lower than this can cause sudden cracking of the final products.

North Indian rosewood is among the finest cabinet and veneer timbers. It is the wood from which 'mridanga', the Rajasthani percussion instrument, is often made. In addition to musical instruments, it is used for plywood, agricultural tools, flooring, as a bentwood, and for turning.

The heartwood is golden to dark brown; the sapwood is white to pale brownish white. The heartwood is durable (its specific gravity is 0.7 – 0.8) and is very resistant to fungi, but the sapwood is readily attacked by dry-wood termites and borers. D. sissoo is known to contain the neoflavonoid dalbergichromene in its stem bark and heartwood.

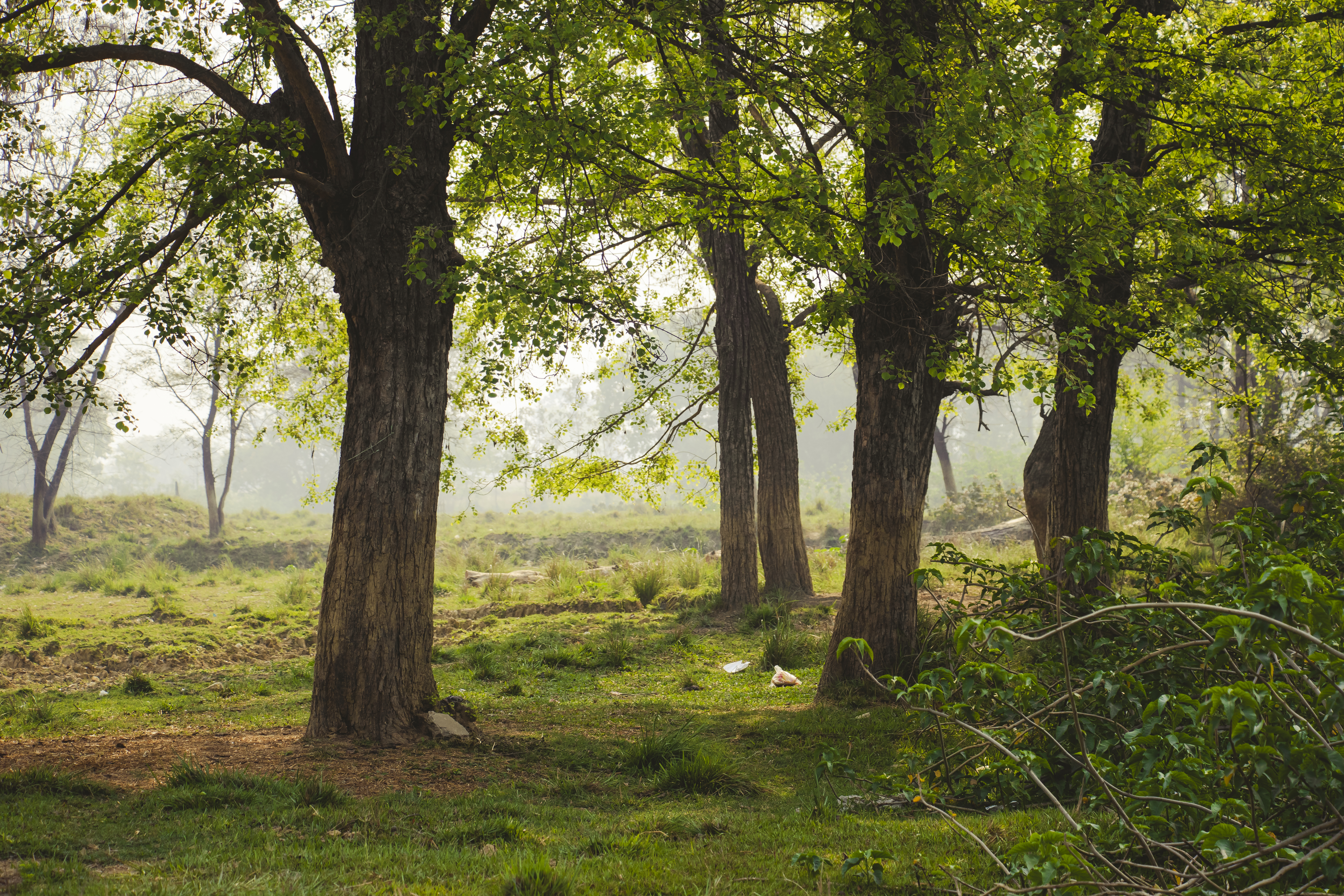
At IAAS, Paklihawa Campus, Nepal

=== Fuel wood ===
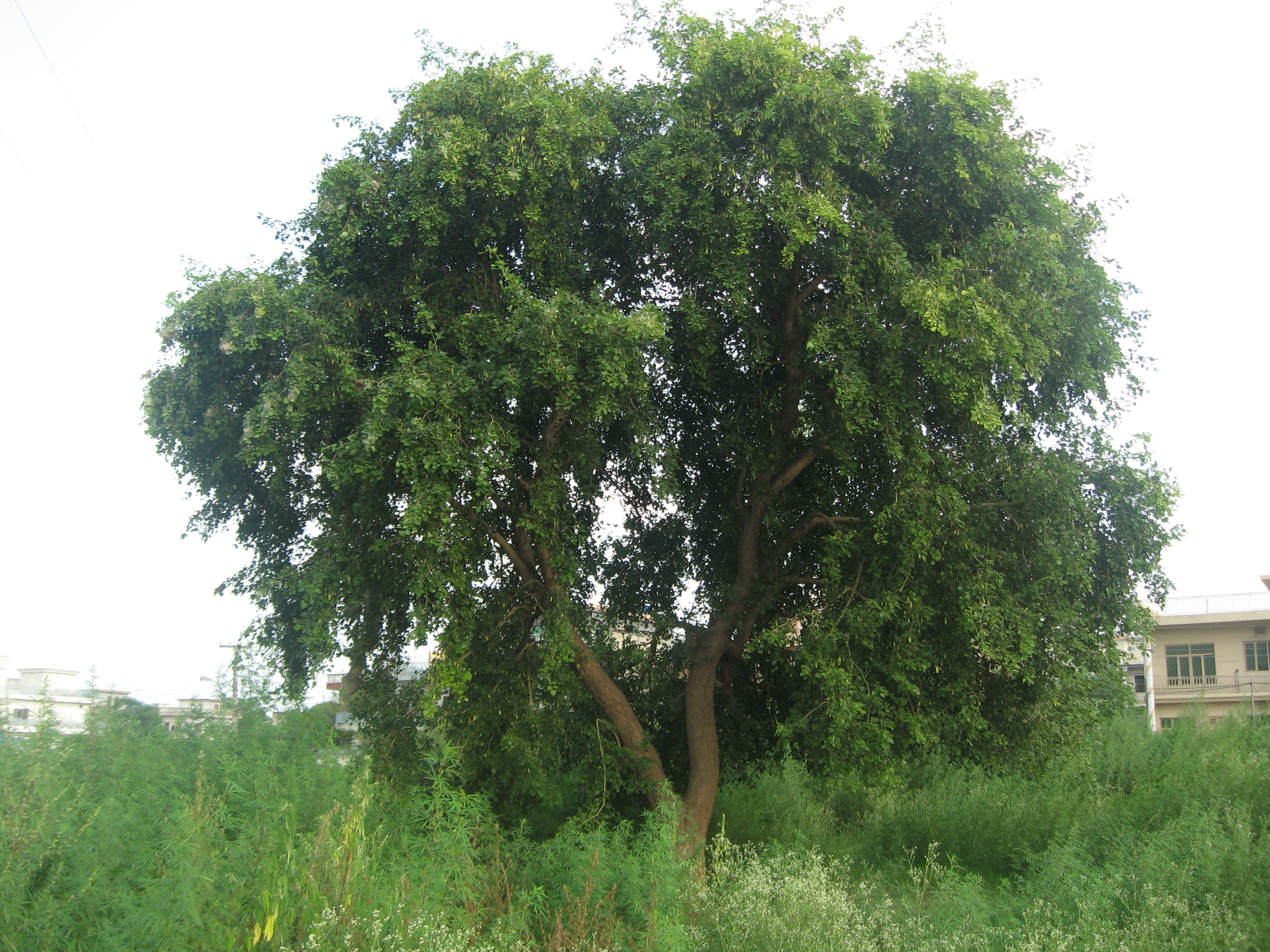
In Pakistan

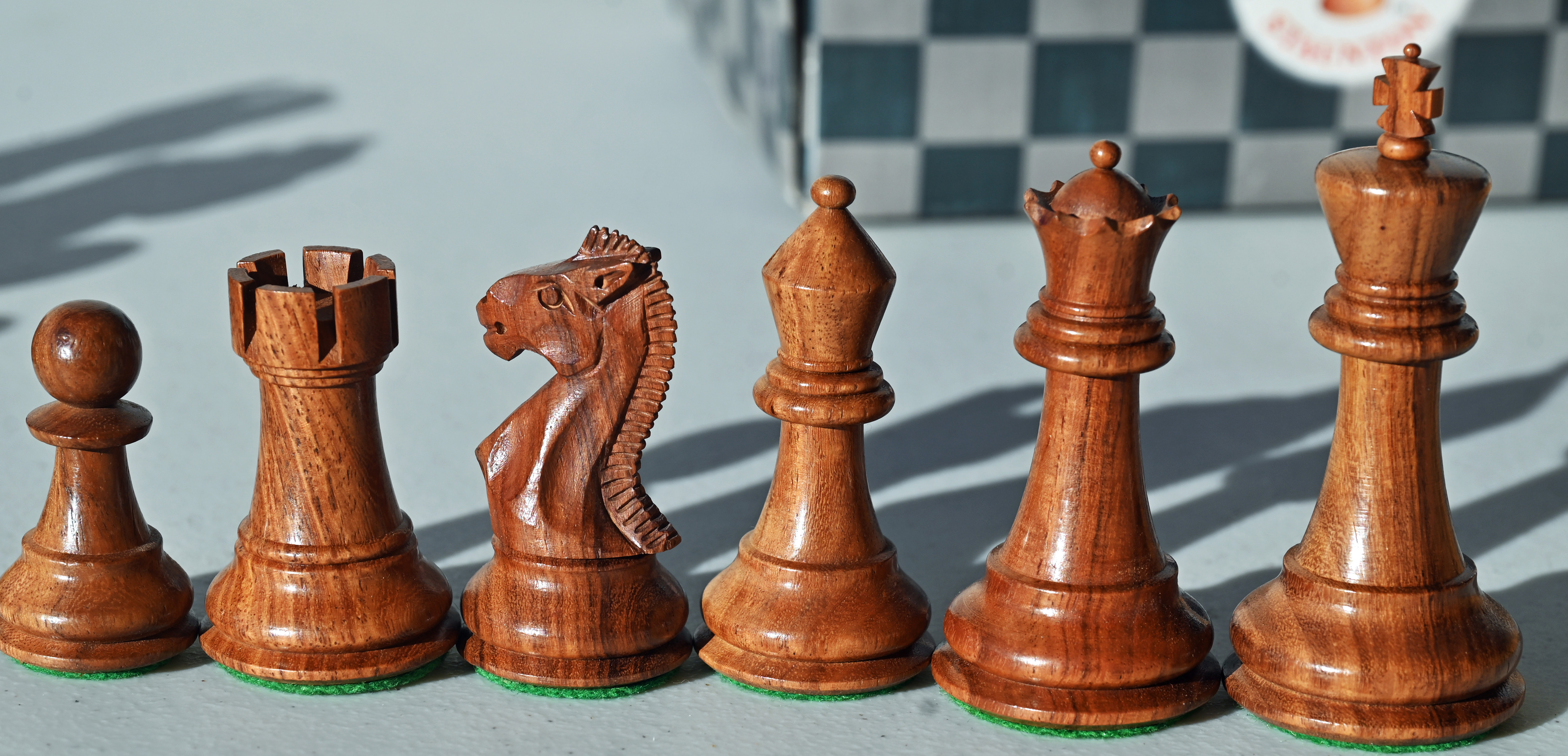
Chess pieces made of sheesham

The calorific value of both the sapwood and heartwood is excellent, being reported to be 4,908 kcal/kg and 5,181 kcal/kg, respectively. As a fuel wood, it is grown on a 10- to 15-year rotation. The tree has excellent coppicing ability, although a loss of vigor after two or three rotations has been reported. The wood makes excellent charcoal for heating and cooking.

=== Fodder ===
The leaves and sprouts make for important winter fodder for monkeys and animals. By turning the fodder into silage, digestive issues can be avoided.

=== Traditional medicine ===
The tree's seed oil and powdered wood are used in the treatment of skin ailments. Dalbergia sissoo may also have efficacy in the treatment of stomach and blood conditions.

=== Teeth brushing ===
Traditionally, slender tree twigs (called datun) are first chewed as a toothbrush and then split as a tongue cleaner. This practice has been in use in Pakistan, Africa, and the Middle East for centuries. Many of India's 80% rural population still start their day with the teeth-cleaning twig either with Salvadora persica or Azadirachta indica. In other parts of the world, shisham twigs are still collected and sold in markets for this use in rural areas.

=== Pesticide ===
An ethanolic extract of the fruits of D. sissoo exhibited molluscicidal effects against eggs of the freshwater snail Biomphalaria pfeifferi.

=== Construction ===
The juice of this plant is a potent ingredient for a mixture of wall plaster, according to the Samarāṅgaṇa Sūtradhāra, which is a Sanskrit treatise dealing with Śilpaśāstra (Hindu science of art and construction).

== Cultivation ==
Propagation takes place most commonly by root suckers, but also by seeds. When exposed to air, the seeds remain viable for only a few months, but if stored in secured vessels can last for as long as four years. Seeds should be soaked in water for 48 hours before sowing; 60% – 80% germination can be expected in 1–3 weeks. Seedlings require partial sun or full sun. In India, shisham wood trading and its uses are under government restrictions.

== Cultural significance ==
Dalbergia sisso is the state tree of the Indian state of Punjab.

== See also ==
- Arid Forest Research Institute
