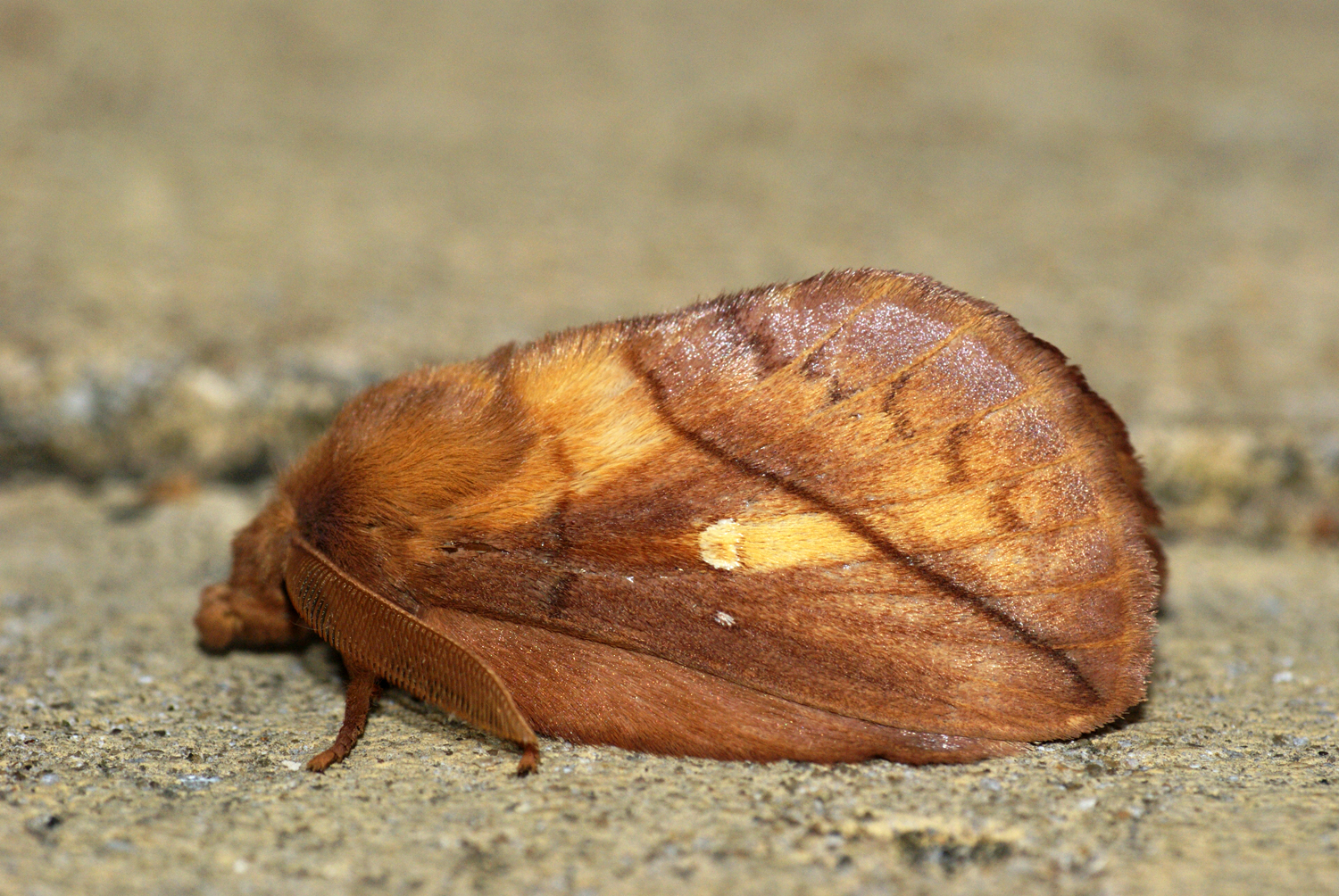
- Euthrix potatoria

Scientific classification
- Domain: Eukaryota
- Kingdom: Animalia
- Phylum: Arthropoda
- Class: Insecta
- Order: Lepidoptera
- Family: Lasiocampidae
- Genus: Euthrix; Meigen, 1830

Synonyms
- Philudoria Kirby, 1892; Philhydoria Kirby, 1897; Routledgia Tutt, 1902; Orienthrix Tshistjakov, 1998

= Euthrix =

Genus of moths

Euthrix is a genus of moths in the family Lasiocampidae. The genus was erected by Johann Wilhelm Meigen in 1830. It includes the following species:

- Euthrix fossa
- Euthrix hani
- Euthrix imitatrix
- ?Euthrix improvisa
- Euthrix laeta
- Euthrix lao
- Euthrix nigropuncta
- Euthrix ochreipuncta
- Euthrix orboy
- Euthrix potatoria
- Euthrix sherpai
- Euthrix tamahonis
- Euthrix tsini
- Euthrix vulpes
