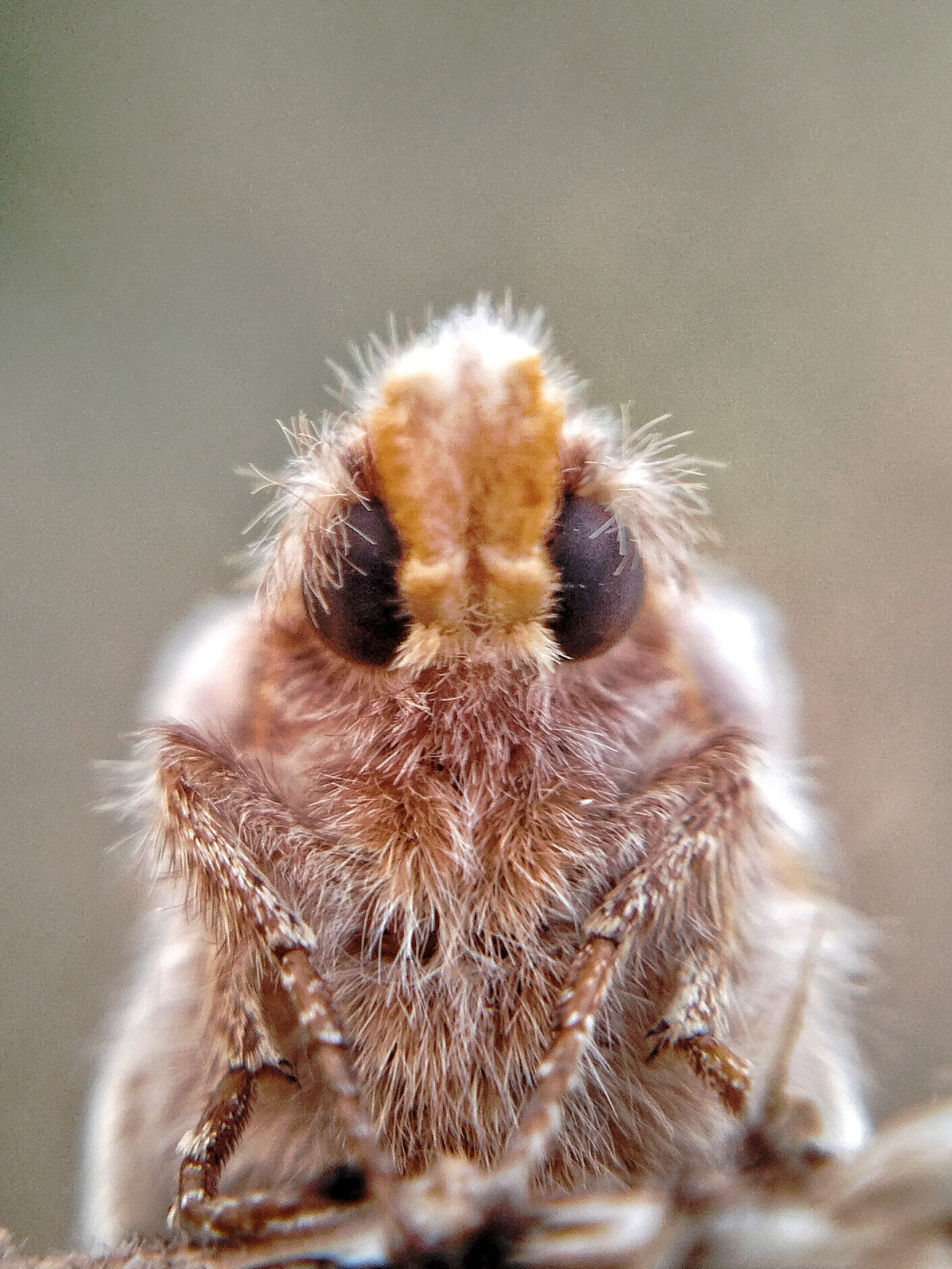
- Male
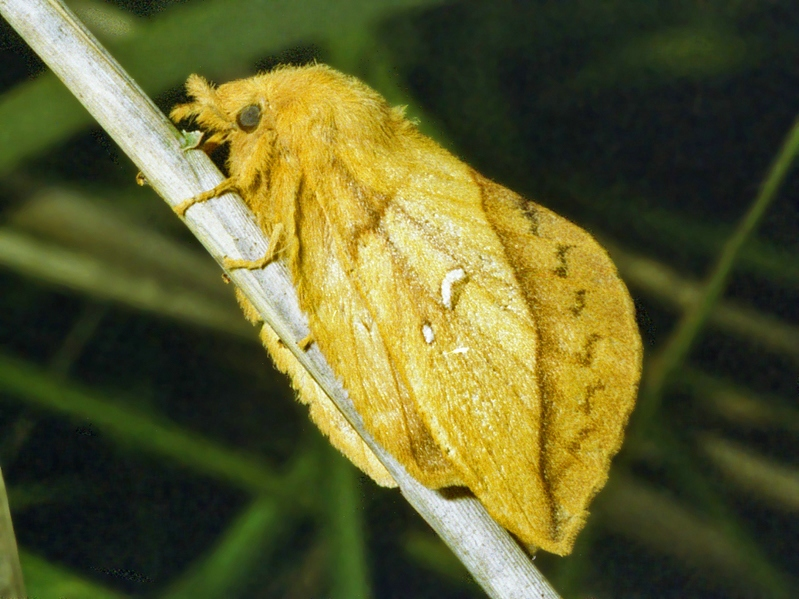
- Female

Scientific classification
- Kingdom: Animalia
- Phylum: Arthropoda
- Class: Insecta
- Order: Lepidoptera
- Family: Lasiocampidae
- Genus: Euthrix
- Species: E. potatoria

Binomial name
- Euthrix potatoria (Linnaeus, 1758)

Synonyms
- Philudoria potatoria

= Euthrix potatoria =

Species of moth

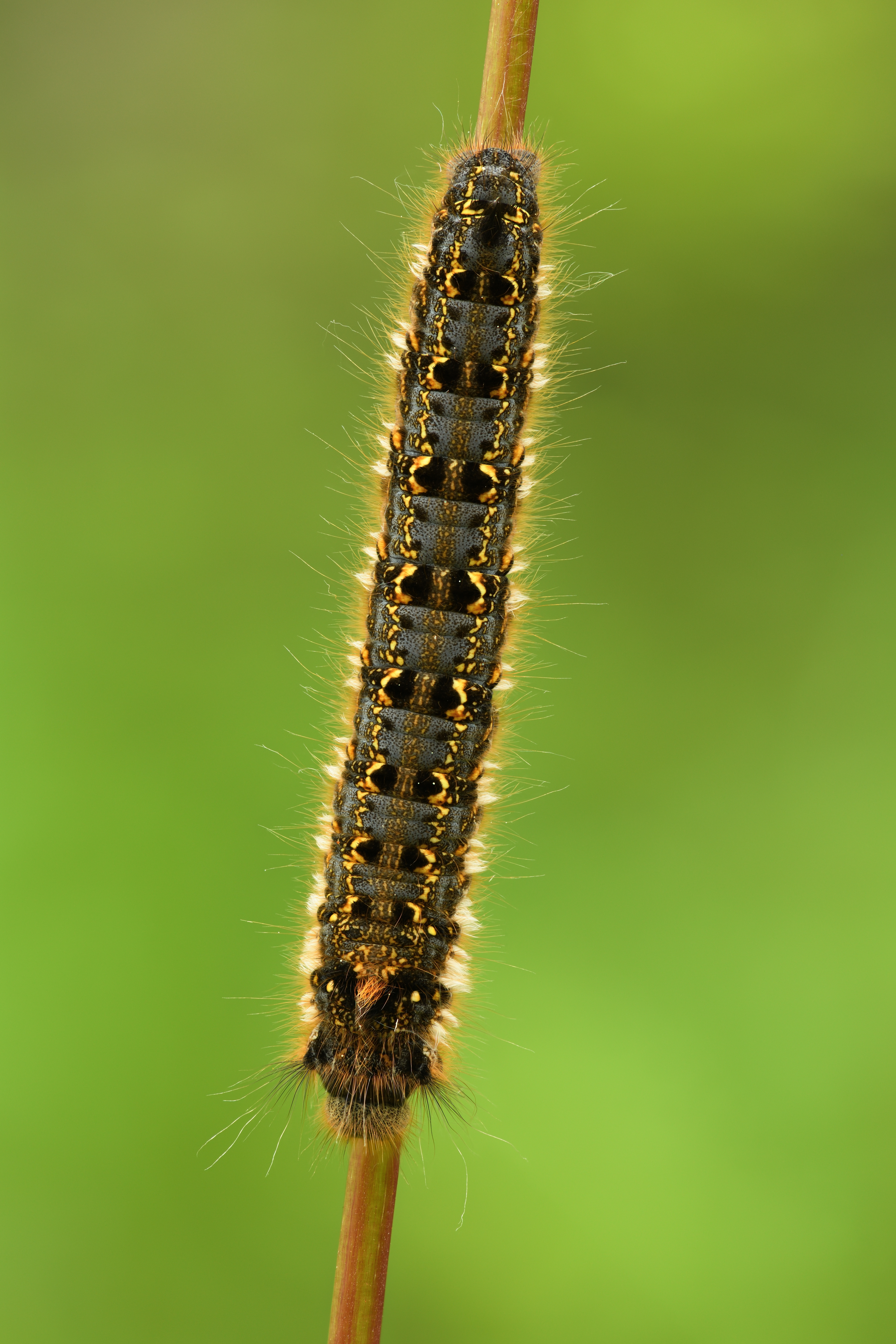
Caterpillar

Euthrix potatoria, the drinker, is an orange-brown moth of the family Lasiocampidae.

The species' common and scientific names derive from the larva's supposed drinking of drops of dew.

== Name ==
The scientific name Euthryx potatoria was given to this moth by Carl Linnaeus in 1758. In choosing the name potatoria 'drinker-like', he was inspired by the Dutch entomologist Johannes Goedaert, who had called the animal dronckaerdt 'drunkard' "because it is very much inclined to drinking". This remark refers to the moth's habit of repeatedly plunging its head into the water. The English name drinker (moth) also refers to Goedaert's analogy.

== Subspecies ==
Subspecies include:

- Euthrix potatoria mikado Bryk
- Euthrix potatoria potatoria (Linnaeus, 1758)

== Distribution and habitat ==
This species can be found in Europe. The species is fairly common in the southern half of Britain. In Scotland, it is common in the west but not in the east of the country. It is most frequently found in marshy places, fens and riversides but may also be seen in drier, grassy terrain.

== Description ==
=== Imago ===
The imago has a wingspan of 4.5–6.5 cm (1.8–2.6 in). The yellowish females are slightly larger than the orange-brown male but both sexes usually show the two distinctive white spots on the forewing. Females have slightly serrated antennae, while male have deeply combed antennae.

=== Larvae and pupae ===
The fully grown larva is about 6 cm (2.4 in) long, hairy, striped and spotted, with distinctive tufts fore and aft. Larvae hibernate while young and resume feeding in the spring, pupating in a cocoon during the summer.

== Biology ==
This nocturnal moth flies from June to August depending on the location. Males especially are attracted to light. The females lay their eggs in small clusters, mainly on the stem of grasses or reeds. The larvae feed on various grasses and reeds (Alopecurus, Deschampsia, Dactylis, Elymus (syn. Elytrigia), Carex, Luzula and other Gramineae).

== Gallery ==
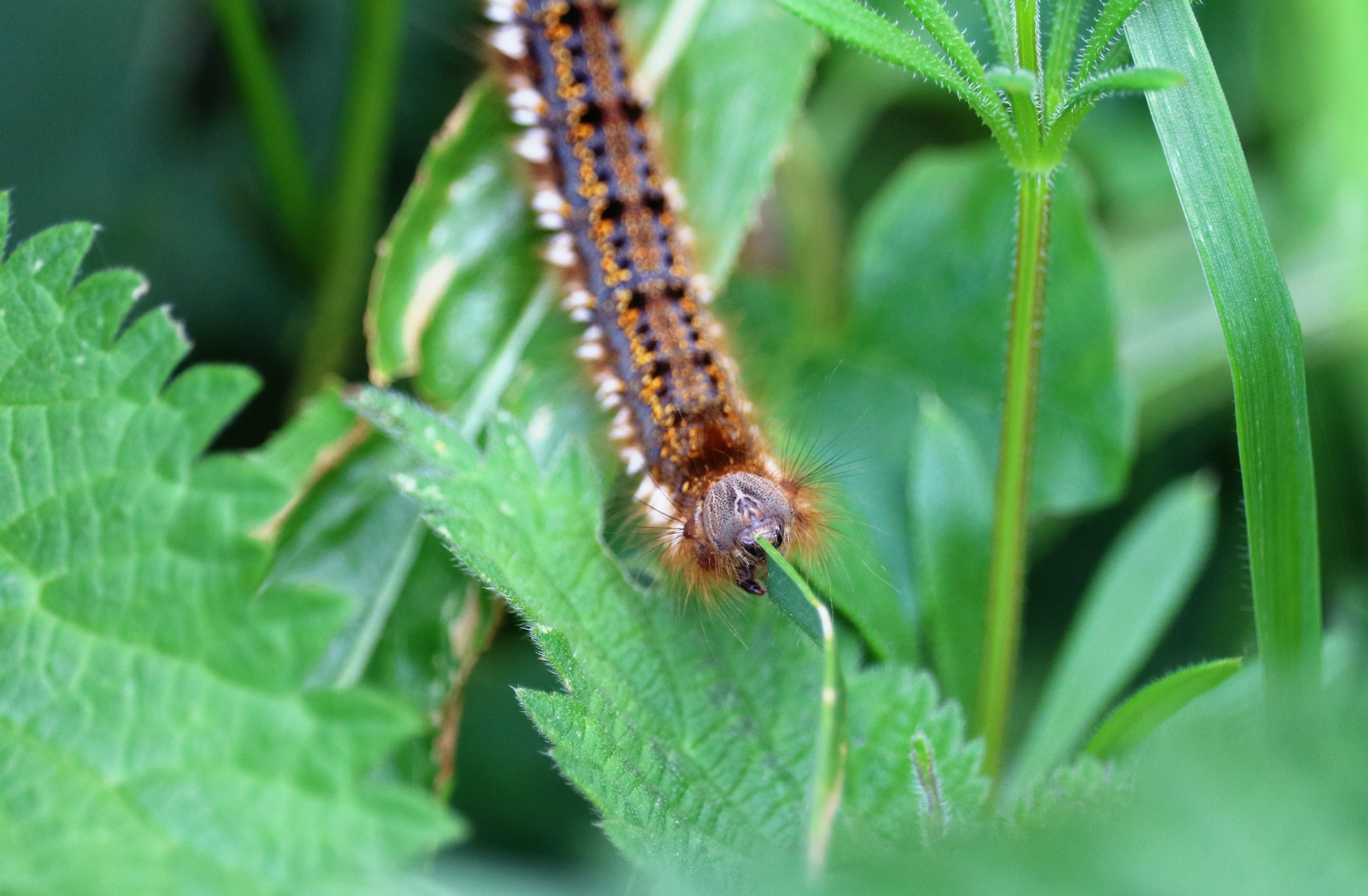
Drinker moth caterpillar eating grass.

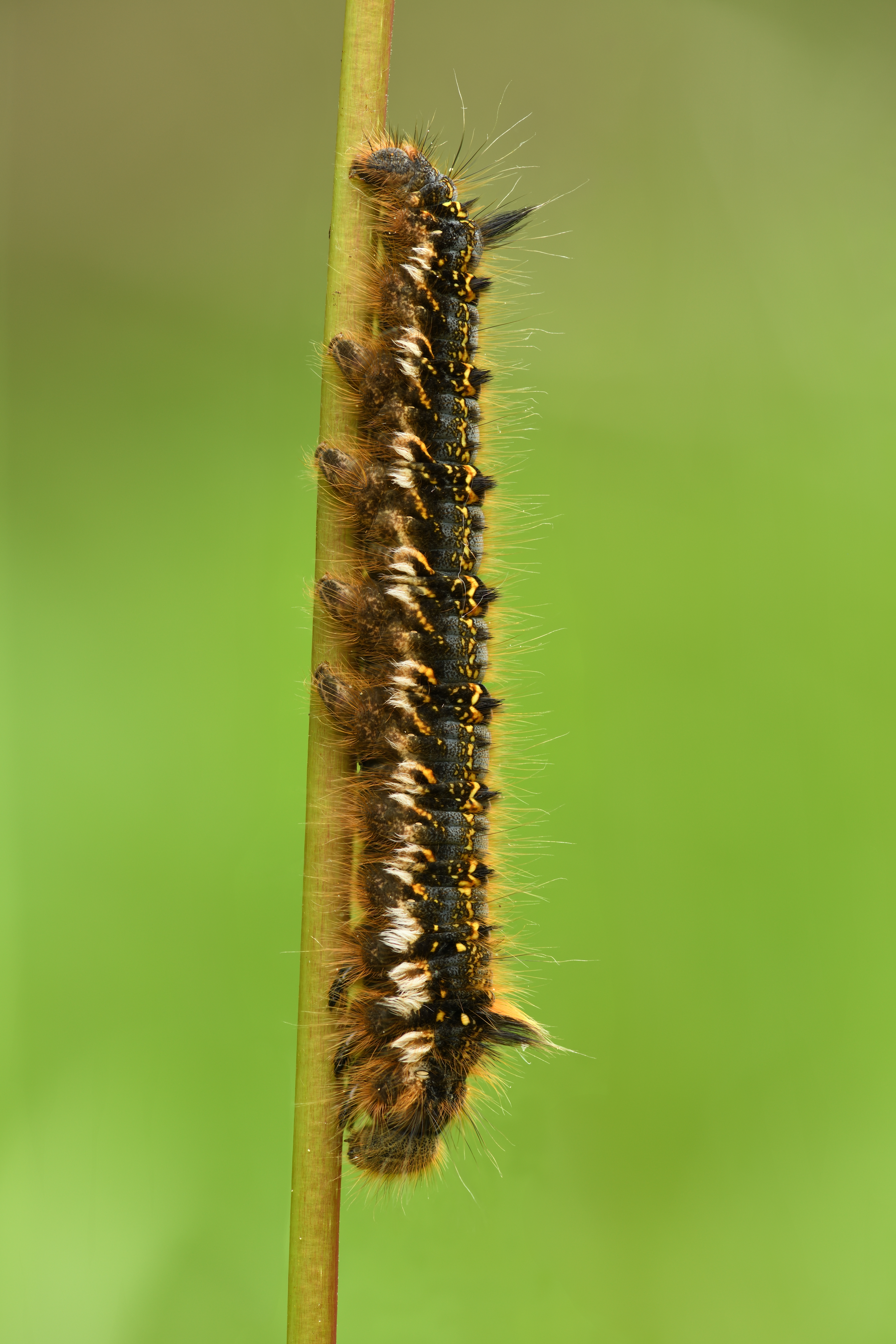
Caterpillar

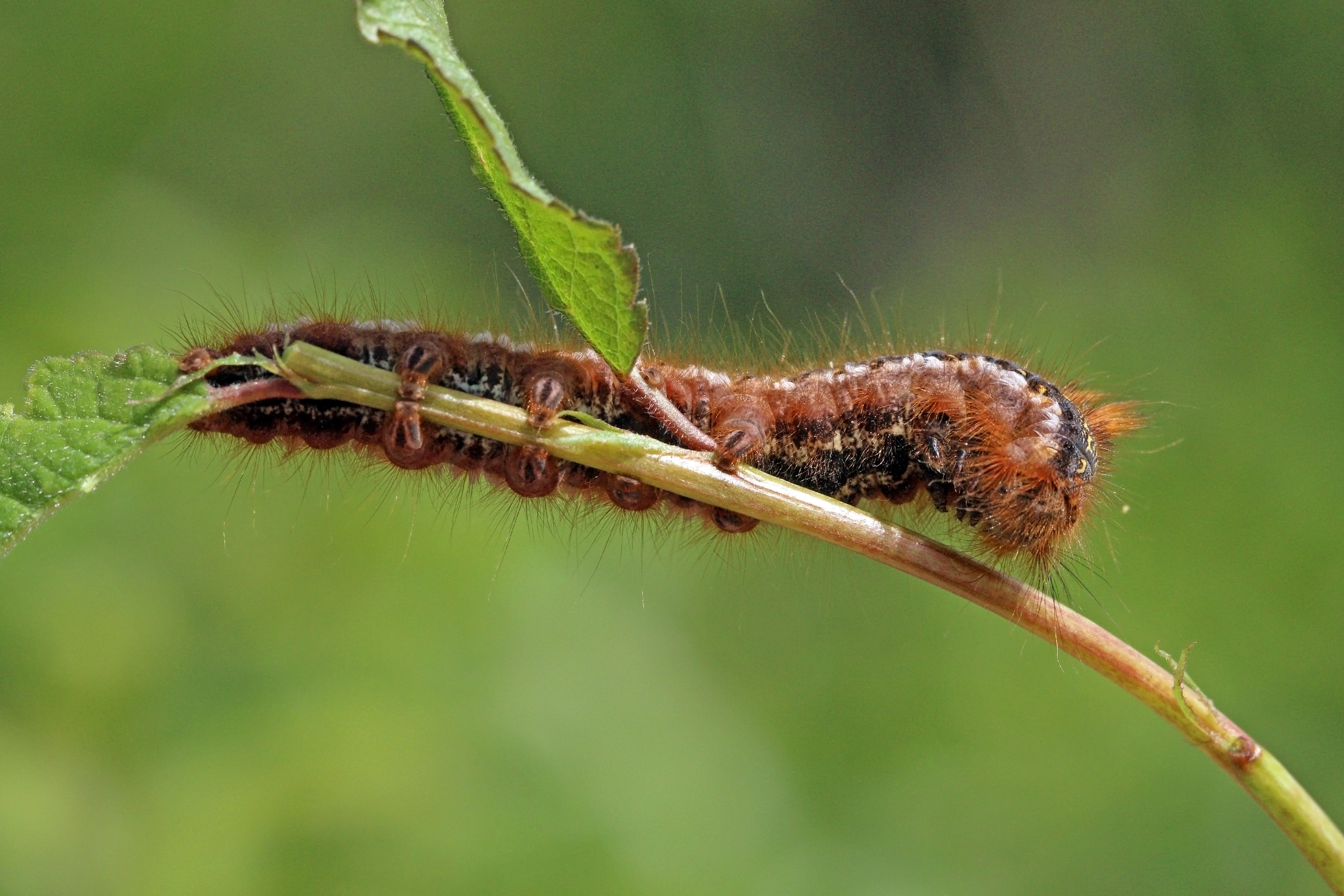
Caterpillar (ventral)

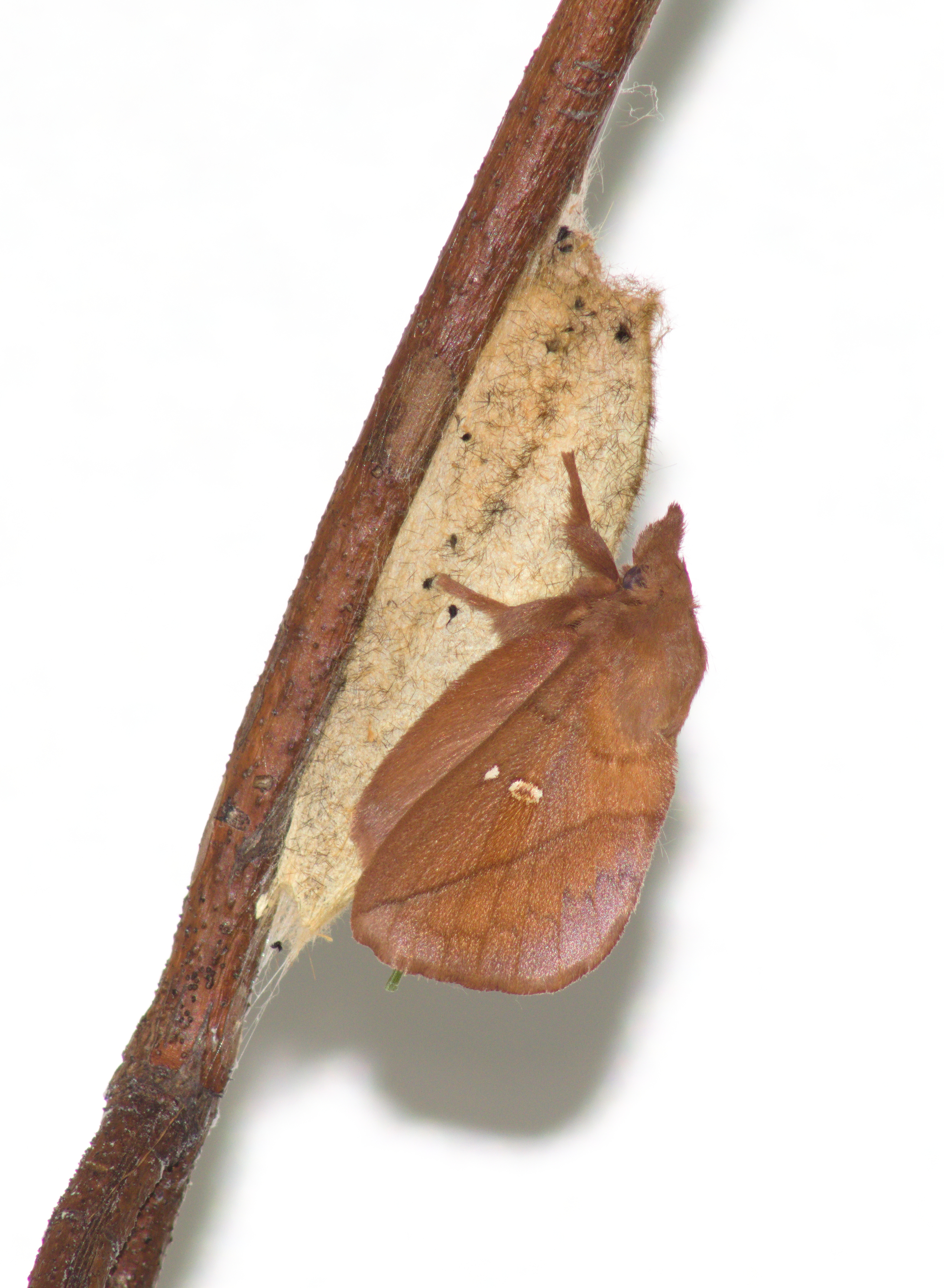

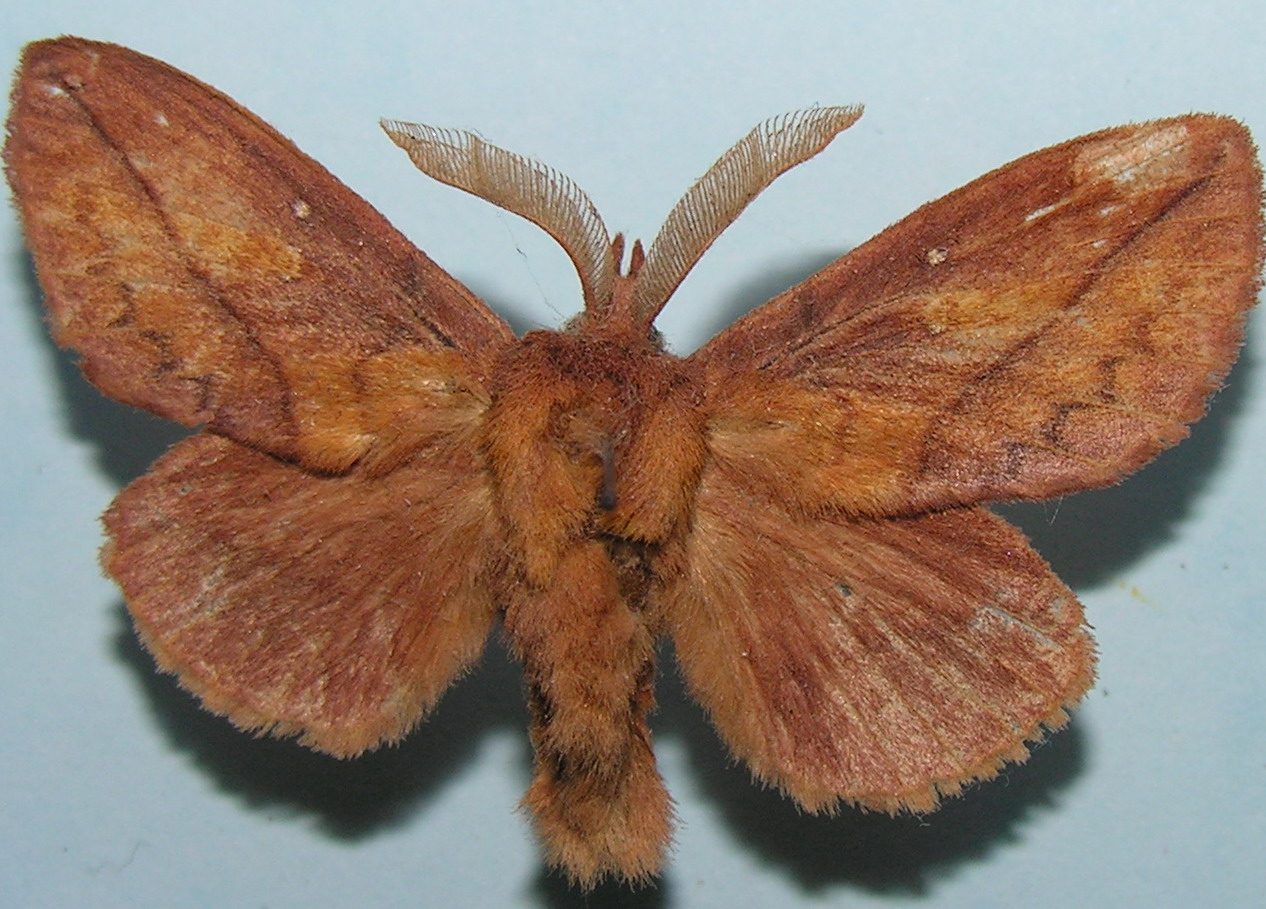
Mounted specimen. Male

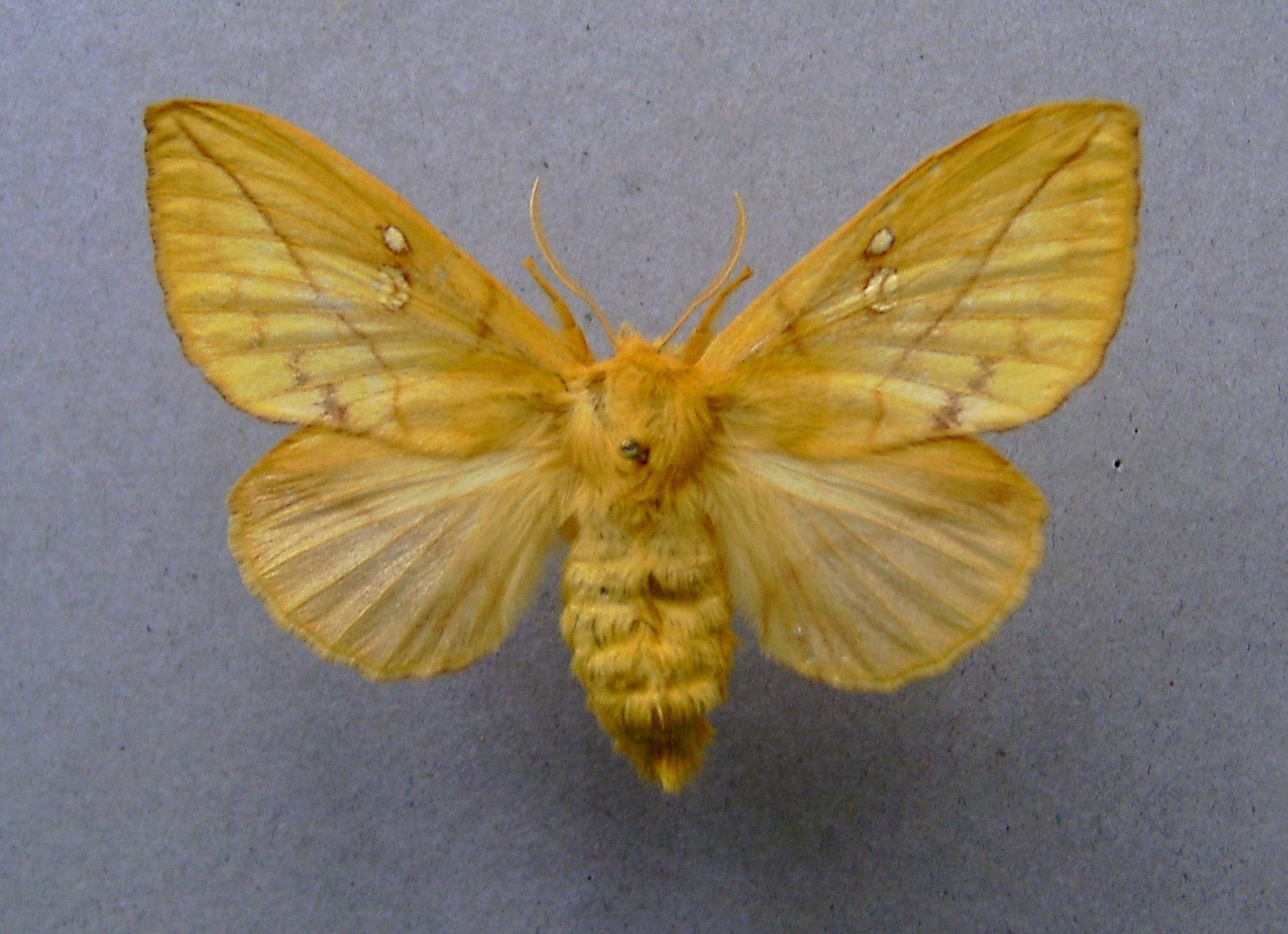
Female
