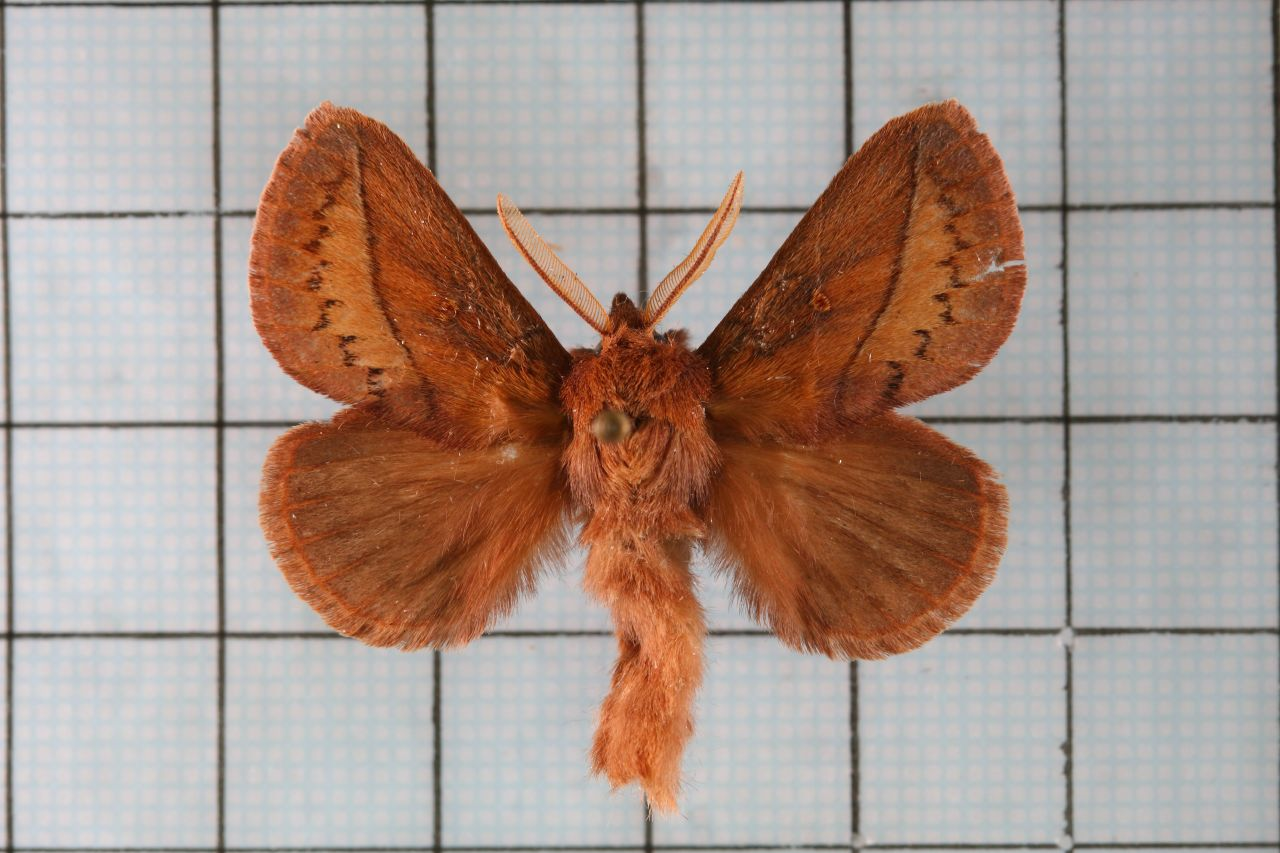

Scientific classification
- Domain: Eukaryota
- Kingdom: Animalia
- Phylum: Arthropoda
- Class: Insecta
- Order: Lepidoptera
- Family: Lasiocampidae
- Genus: Euthrix
- Species: E. ochreipuncta

Binomial name
- Euthrix ochreipuncta (Wileman, 1910)

Synonyms
- Odonestis ochreipuncta Wileman, 1910

= Euthrix ochreipuncta =

Species of moth

Euthrix ochreipuncta is a moth in the family Lasiocampidae. It is found in Taiwan.

The wingspan is 45–55 mm. Adults are on wing in September.
