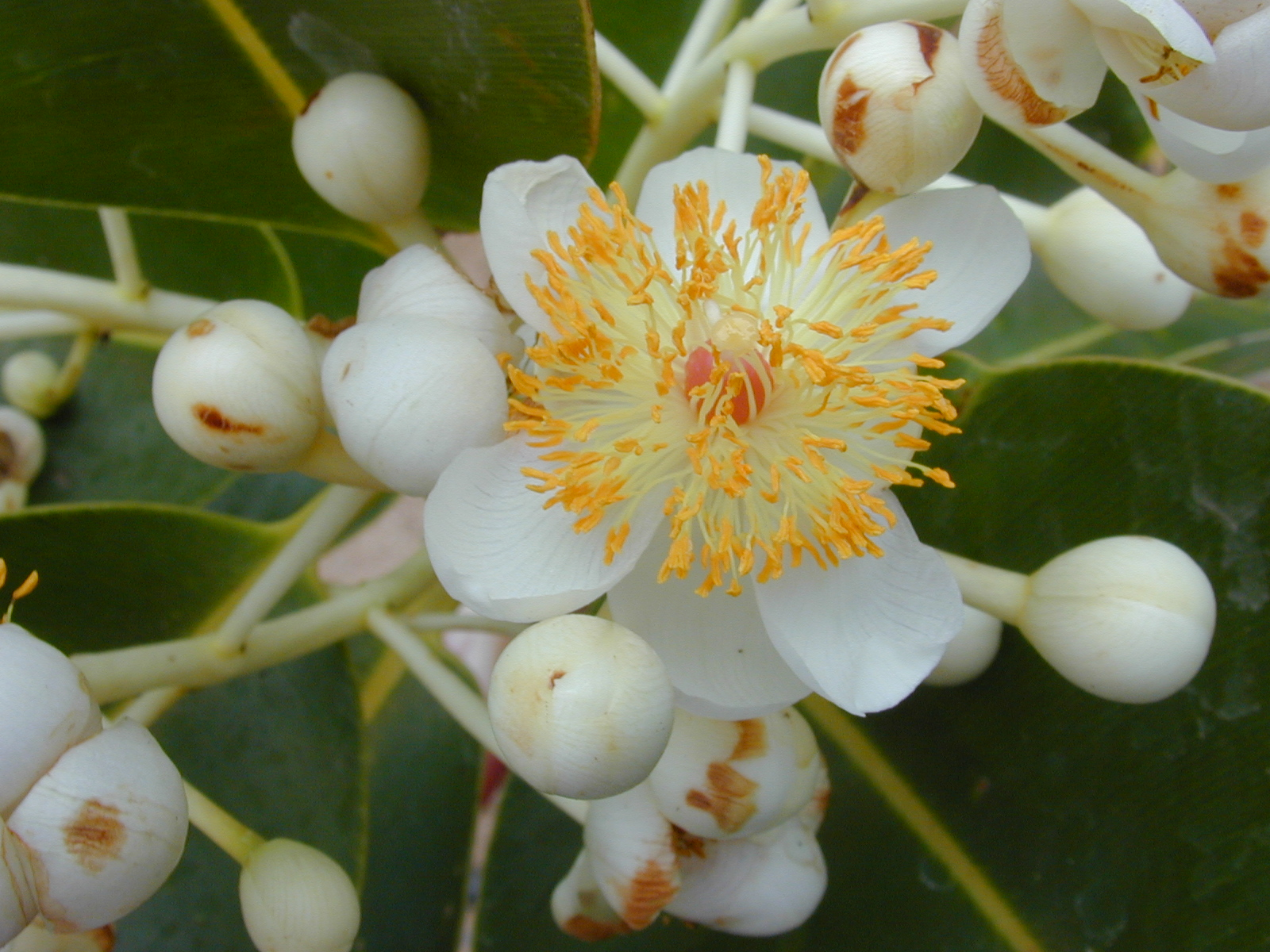

Conservation status
- Least Concern (IUCN 3.1)

Scientific classification
- Kingdom: Plantae
- Clade: Tracheophytes
- Clade: Angiosperms
- Clade: Eudicots
- Clade: Rosids
- Order: Malpighiales
- Family: Calophyllaceae
- Genus: Calophyllum
- Species: C. inophyllum

Binomial name
- Calophyllum inophyllum L.

Synonyms
- 10 synonyms: Balsamaria inophyllum Lour.; Calophyllum apetalum Blanco; Calophyllum bintagor Roxb.; Calophyllum blumei Wight; Calophyllum inophyllum f. oblongata Miq.; Calophyllum inophyllum f. obovata Miq.; Calophyllum inophyllum var. takamaka Fosberg; Calophyllum inophyllum var. wakamatsui (Kaneh.) Fosberg & Sachet; Calophyllum ovatifolium Noronha; Calophyllum wakamatsui Kaneh.

= Calophyllum inophyllum =

Species of tree

Calophyllum inophyllum is a large evergreen plant, commonly called tamanu, oil-nut, mastwood, beach calophyllum or beautyleaf. It is native to the Old World Tropics, from Africa through Asia to Australia and Polynesia. Due to its importance as a source of timber for the traditional shipbuilding of large outrigger ships, it has been spread in prehistoric times by the migrations of the Austronesian peoples to the islands of Oceania and Madagascar, along with other members of the genus Calophyllum. It has since been naturalized in regions of the East African coast. It is also a source of the culturally important tamanu oil.

== Names ==
Calophyllum inophyllum is also known as Alexandrian laurel balltree, beach touriga, Borneo-mahogany, Indian doomba oiltree, Indian-laurel, laurelwood, red poon, satin touriga, and tacamahac-tree. In Island Southeast Asia and Oceania, it is also commonly known as bintangur, bitaog, tamanu, or kamani. In Kiswahili it is known as Mtondoo.

== Description ==
=== Trunk and leaves ===
Calophyllum inophyllum is a low-branching and slow-growing tree, which spreads with a broad and irregular crown. It usually reaches 8 to 30 m (26 to 98 ft) in height. Its trunk is thick and covered with black and cracked bark.

=== Flowers ===
Flowering can occur perennially, but usually two distinct flowering periods are observed each year: in late spring from April to June, and in late autumn from October to December. The flower is 25 to 30 mm (1.0 to 1.2 in) wide and occurs in racemose or paniculate inflorescences consisting of four to 15 flowers. It has a sweet fragrance, which attracts many insects to pollinate it. The blooming is all-year-round. The fruit (the ballnut) appears as rounded and green drupe with 2–4 cm (0.8–1.6 in) in diameter and a single large seed is located at the center.

=== Fruit ===
The fruit (the ballnut) is a round, green drupe measuring 2 to 4 cm (0.8 to 1.6 in) in diameter. When ripe, the fruit is wrinkled and its color varies from yellow to brownish-red. Although the mature fruit is poisonous to humans, the immature fruit has thin spongy flesh with a taste slightly like apple.

== Distribution and habitat ==
Calophyllum inophyllum is native to the following regions as defined in the World Geographical Scheme for Recording Plant Distributions:

- East Tropical Africa: Kenya, Tanzania
- South Tropical Africa: Mozambique
- Western Indian Ocean: Aldabra, Chagos Archipelago, Comoros, Madagascar, Mauritius, Mozambique Channel Islands, Rodrigues, Réunion, Seychelles
- China: Hainan
- Eastern Asia: Kazan-retto, Nansei-shoto, Ogasawara-shoto, Taiwan
- Indian Subcontinent: Bangladesh, India, Laccadive Islands, Maldives, Sri Lanka
- Indo-China: Andaman Islands, Cambodia, Laos, Myanmar, Nicobar Islands South China Sea, Thailand, Vietnam
- Malesia: Borneo, Christmas Island, Cocos (Keeling) Islands, Jawa, Lesser Sunda Islands, Malaya, Maluku, Philippines, Sulawesi, Sumatera
- Papuasia: Bismarck Archipelago, New Guinea, Solomon Islands
- Australia: Queensland
- North-Central Pacific: Hawaii
- Northwestern Pacific: Caroline Islands, Marianas, Marshall Islands
- South-Central Pacific: Cook Islands
- Southwestern Pacific: Fiji, Gilbert Islands, Nauru, New Caledonia, Niue, Samoa, Santa Cruz Islands, Tokelau-Manihiki, Tonga, Tuvalu, Vanuatu, Wallis-Futuna Islands

It has been introduced to Florida and some areas of Central America, the Caribbean and western Africa..

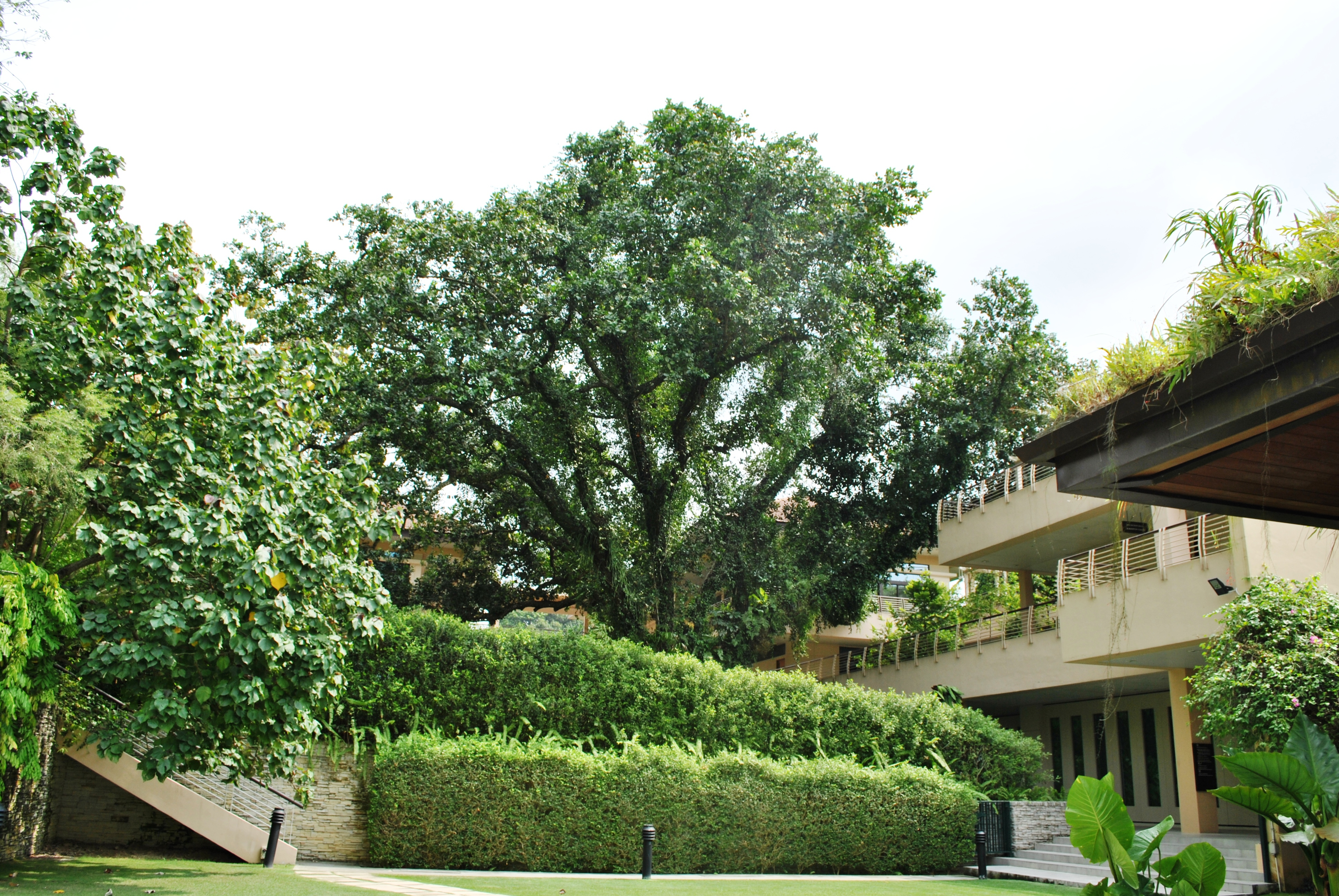
Heritage tree, Penaga Laut (Calophyllum inophyllum) at Singapore Botanic Gardens

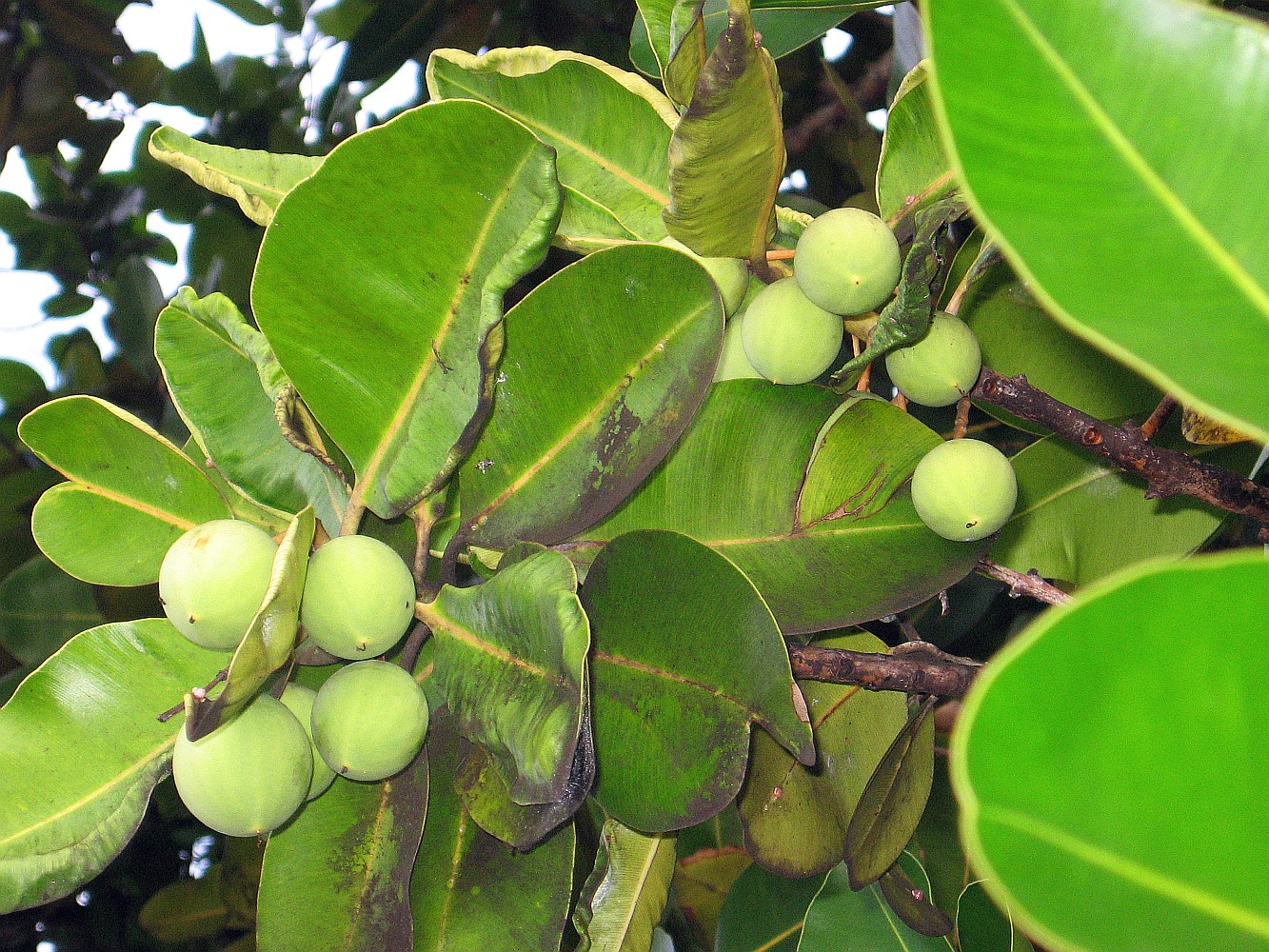
Fruits

Now, it is widely cultivated in all tropical regions of the world. Because of its decorative leaves, fragrant flowers, and spreading crown, it is best known as an ornamental plant.

This tree often grows in coastal regions, as well as nearby lowland forests. However, it has also been cultivated successfully in inland areas at moderate altitudes. It tolerates varied kinds of soil, including coastal sand, clay, or even degraded soil.

== Uses ==
=== Shipbuilding ===
Mastwood is notable for its ability to grow to massive sizes in sandy or rocky beaches of island and coastal habitats, as well as its habit of sending out arching large trunks over the water where its seeds are dispersed via the currents. Due to these characters, mastwood is of particular importance to traditional shipbuilding of the larger Austronesian outrigger ships and was carried with them as they migrated to Oceania and Madagascar. Other species of the genus Calophyllum were used similarly, including Calophyllum soulattri, Calophyllum peekelii, and Calophyllum goniocarpum. It was comparable in importance to the traditional use of oak in European shipbuilding and timber industries.

Various parts of the mastwood were integral to the manufacture of outrigger canoes among various Austronesian peoples. The large curving limbs were commonly carved into the dugout canoe that formed the keel of the Austronesian outrigger ships. The strakes, which are attached to the keel by the uniquely Austronesian technique of "sewing" them with a combination of dowels and lashed lugs instead of nails, can also be made from mastwood, but it is more commonly made from other softer timber species like Artocarpus. Other pieces became masts, outrigger floats, and outrigger spars. Smaller curving limbs can also be carved into the ribs of the boat.

In many parts of Polynesia, mastwood groves planted in marae were considered sacred and the abodes of spirits. Mastwood was also carved into religious objects such as tiki. They are also commonly mentioned in the chants and folklore of Polynesia.

In Australia, the 1889 book The Useful Native Plants of Australia records "During a debate on the Pearl Fisheries Bill in the Queensland Assembly, a clause was specially inserted to protect trees of this species at Thursday Island. A fine of £10 is inflicted on any person who cuts down or injures this or a cocoa-nut tree, or any other tree bearing edible fruit. This clause is, of course, in the interest of the aboriginals."

=== Other uses ===
Aside from shipbuilding, tamanu oil extracted from the fruit kernels was important in Polynesian culture. The oils, as well as poultices made from leaves and flowers, are also commonly used for traditional medicine. The leaves contain coumarin derivatives compounds that are poisonous to fish and can be used as fish poison. The sap of the tree is poisonous and is used to make poison arrows in Samoa. The mature fruit is poisonous enough to use as rat baits.

The nuts are dried before cracking, after which the oil-laden kernel is removed and further dried. The first neoflavone isolated from natural sources (1951) was calophyllolide from C. inophyllum seeds.

The Mavilan, a Tulu-speaking tribe in north Kerala in India, use the bark to make a powder that they mix with water and apply to plants affected by a type of water-borne plant disease that they call neeru vembu.

The fatty acid methyl esters derived from C. inophyllum seed oil meets the major biodiesel requirements in the United States (ASTM D 6751), and European Union (EN 14214). The average oil yield is 11.7 kg-oil per tree or 4680 kg-oil per hectare. In the northwest coastal areas of Luzon Island in the Philippines, the oil was used for night lamps. This widespread use started to decline when kerosene became available, and later on electricity. It was also used as fuel to generate electricity to provide power for radios during World War II.

Extracts contained sesquiterpenoids, triterpenoids, fatty acids, and fatty acid derivatives.

== See also ==
- Domesticated plants and animals of Austronesia
