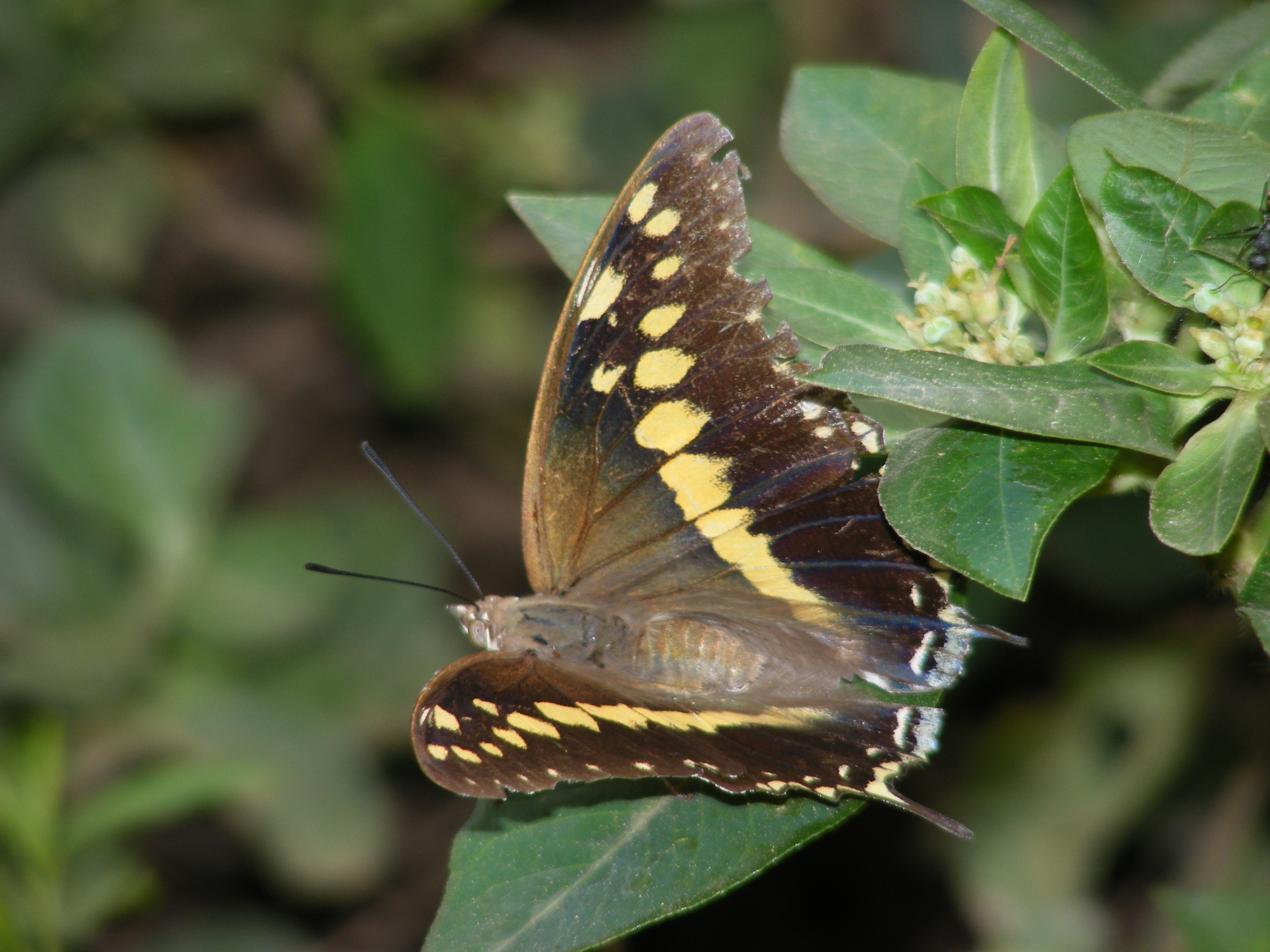
- Upper side
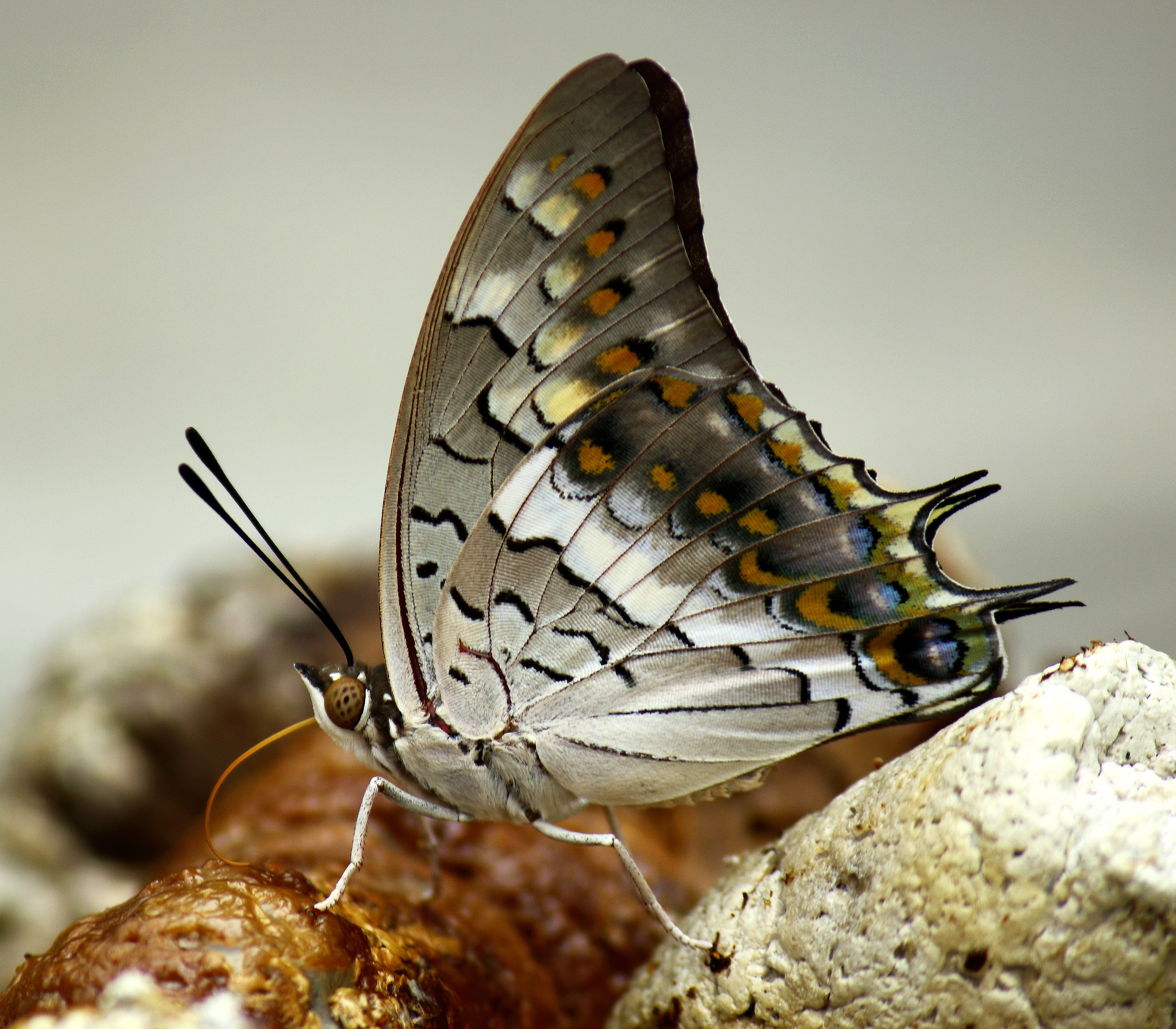
- Underside

Scientific classification
- Kingdom: Animalia
- Phylum: Arthropoda
- Clade: Pancrustacea
- Class: Insecta
- Order: Lepidoptera
- Family: Nymphalidae
- Genus: Charaxes
- Species: C. solon

Binomial name
- Charaxes solon (Fabricius) 1793

Synonyms
- Papilio fabius Fabricius, 1781 (preocc.); Papilio solon Fabricius, 1793

= Charaxes solon =

Black rajah

Species of butterfly

Charaxes solon, the black rajah, is a butterfly species found in tropical Asia. It belongs to the Charaxinae (rajahs and nawabs) in the brush-footed butterfly family (Nymphalidae).

== Description ==
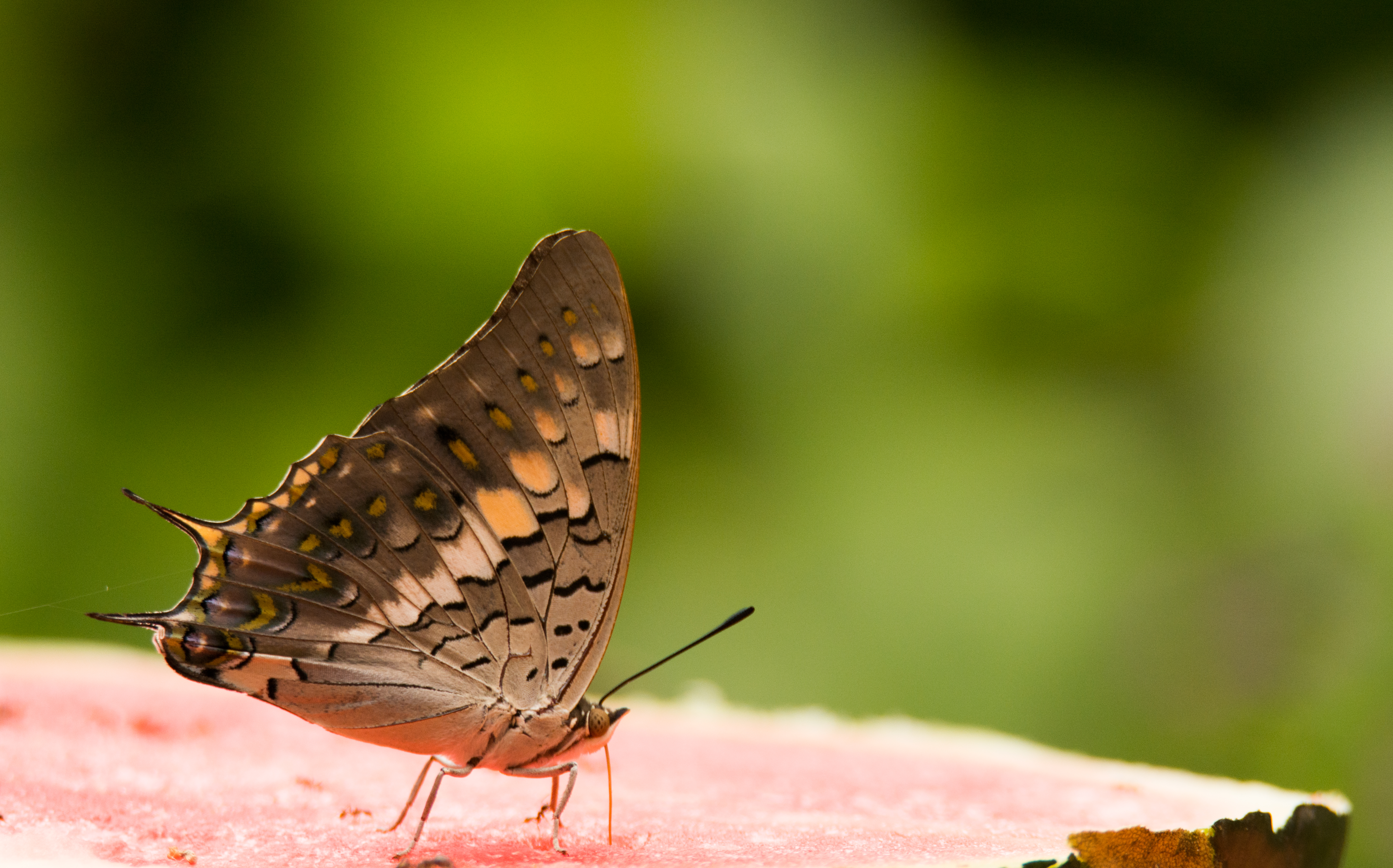
Underside

The black rajah is a medium-sized butterfly with a 70- to 80-mm wingspan. Above, the butterfly is dark brownish black with greenish or white discal bands across both the wings. The band is broken into spots towards the apex of the fore wing. The hind wing has two similar-sized tails at veins 2 and 4. These tails are longer in the females and more pointed in the males.

=== Egg ===
Its egg is transparent yellow and spherical, with longitudinal ridges. It has a dark red, uneven band around its upper half.

=== Caterpillar ===
The caterpillar is dark green with irregular rows of yellow tubercles. The caterpillar is cylindrical and may have a round white blotch on the seventh segment. The head is curved out and has horns and spines. The pupa is short and dark green, with a lateral longitudinal line marbled with white.

== Range ==
The butterfly is found in South and Southeast Asia. It occurs in Sri Lanka, India, Pakistan, Myanmar, Indochina, Cambodia, Peninsular Malaysia, Singapore, Sumatra, Sulawesi, and the Philippines (Palawan, Sulu Archipelago). In India, the butterfly occurs in South India, and the Himalayas from Kumaon, Sikkim, into Bhutan, through Assam, and onto Myanmar. At least in South Asia, it is not rare.

== Ecology ==
The black rajah is generally a low-elevation butterfly and can be found at altitudes up to 1950 m (6500 feet) ASL.

The caterpillars generally feed on Fabaceae, such as tamarind Tamarindus indica. At least on Borneo but probably elsewhere too, adults do generally not visit carrion or old fruit to drink liquids.

== Gallery ==
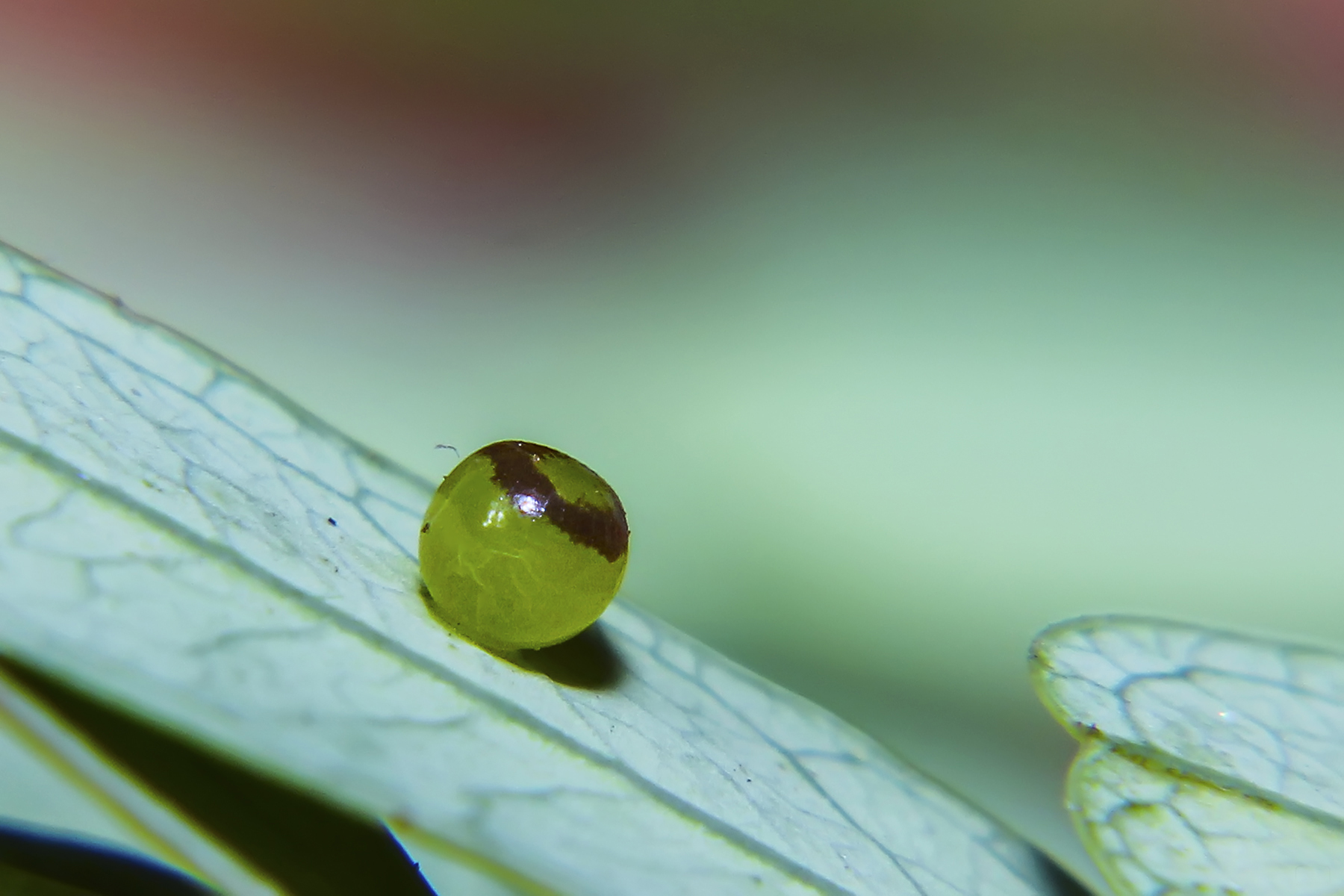
Egg

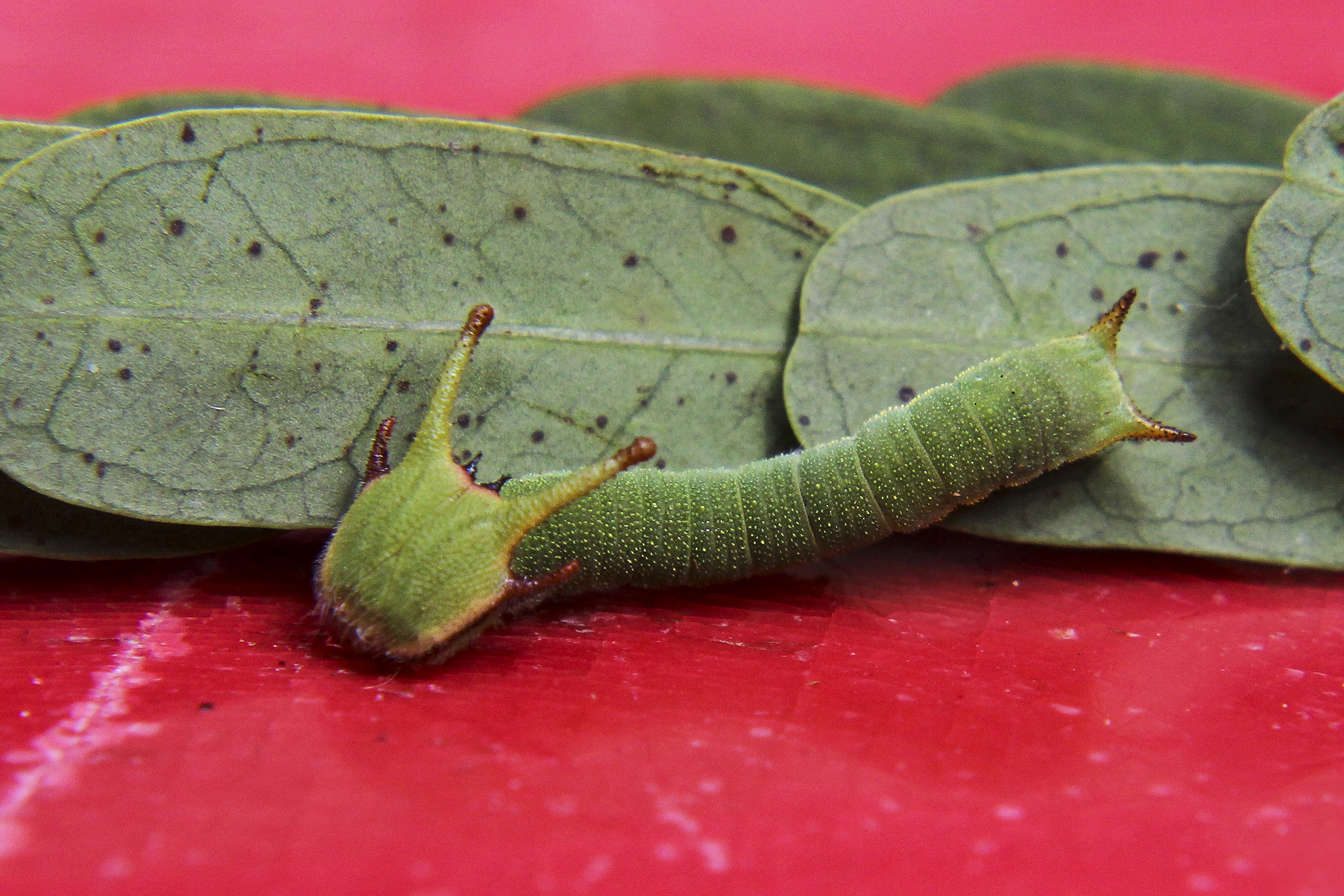
Caterpillar

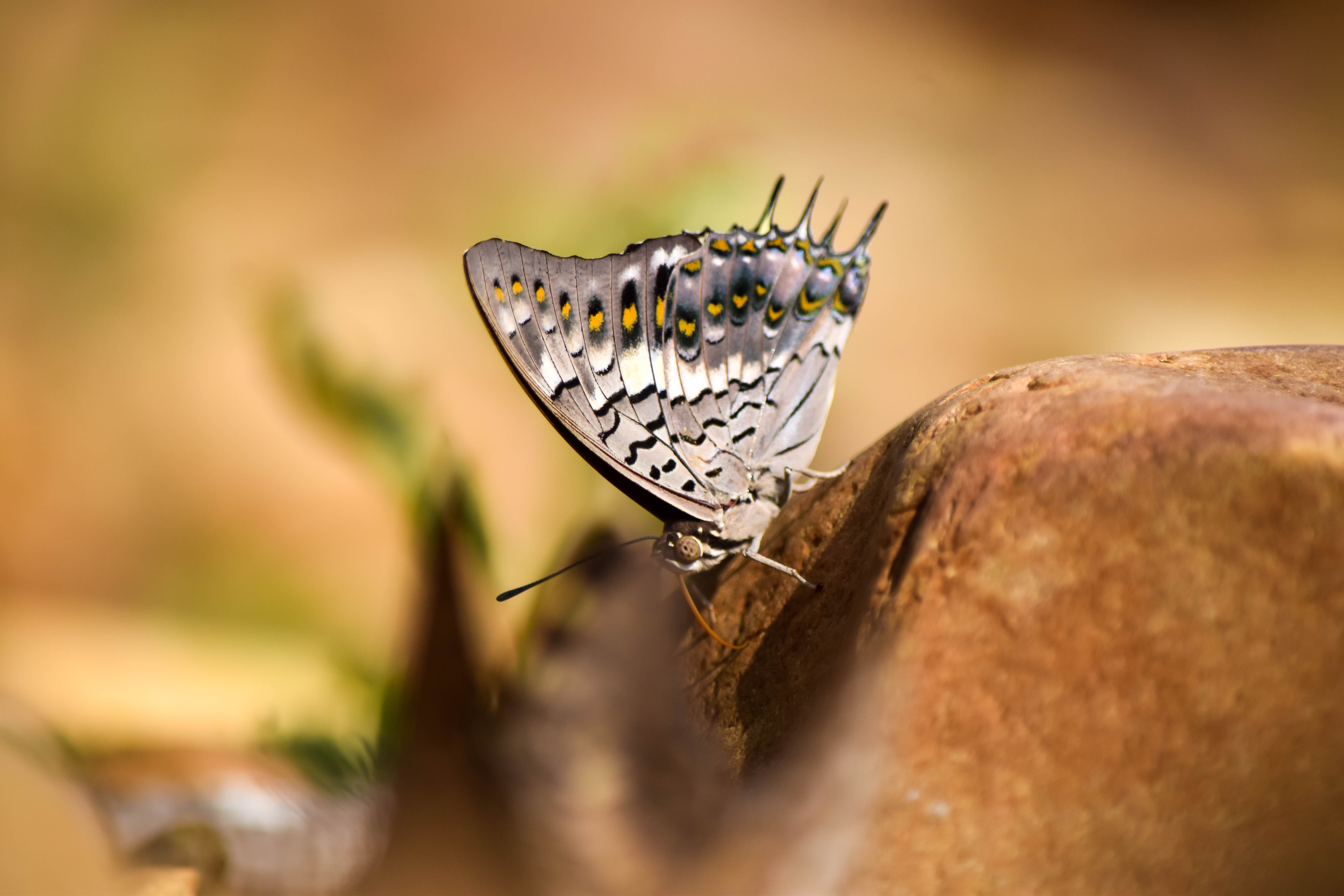
Black rajah (Charaxes solon) adult from Tirupati, Andhra Pradesh

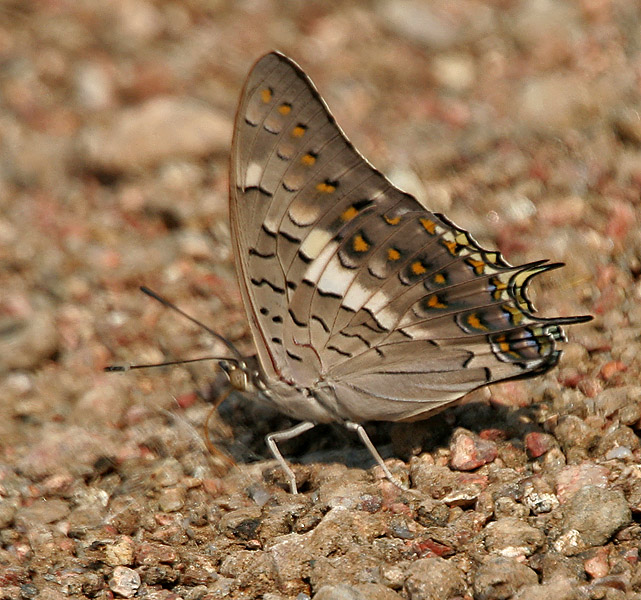
Adult in Kawal Wildlife Sanctuary, India

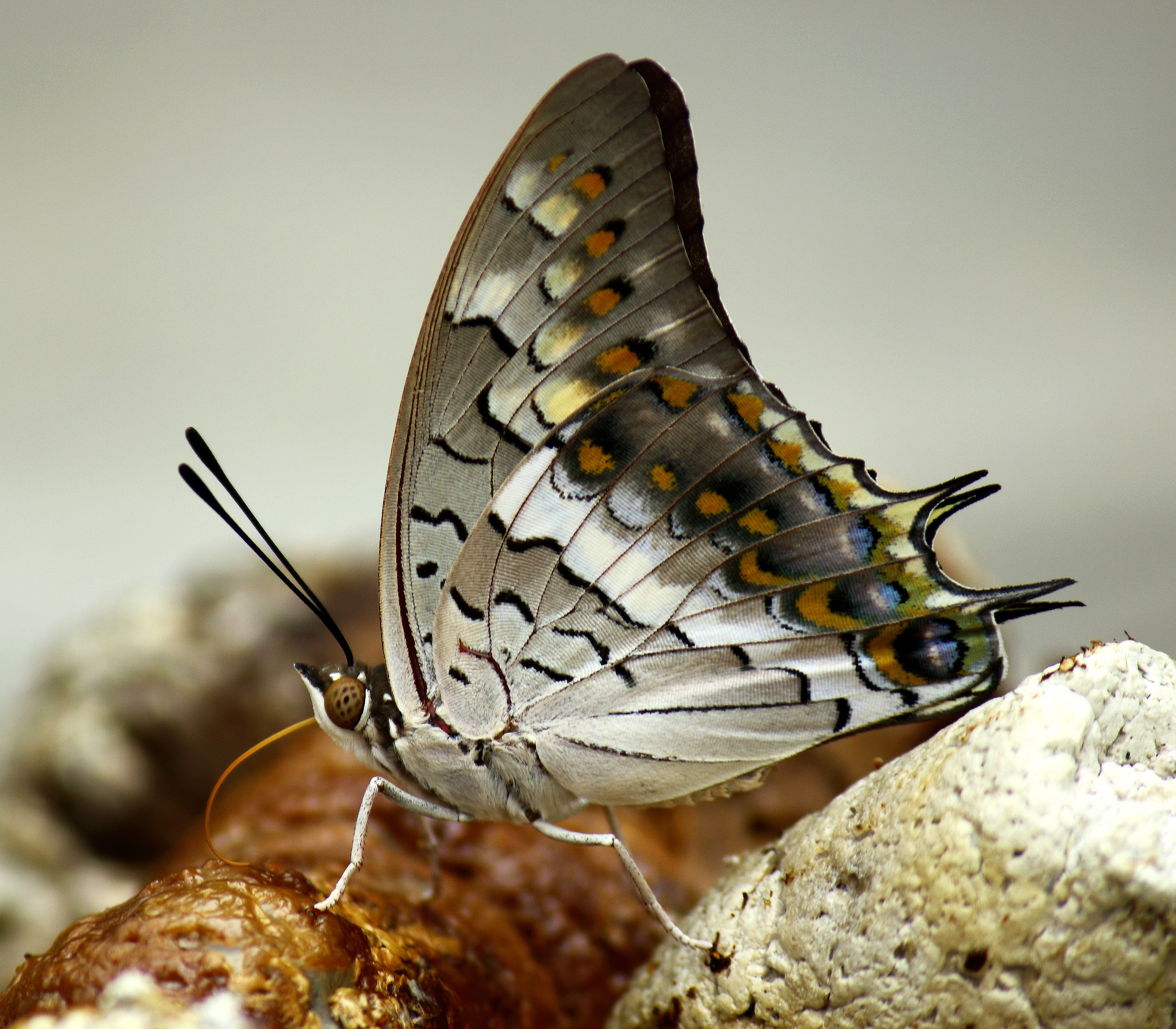
In Chandannagar, West Bengal, India

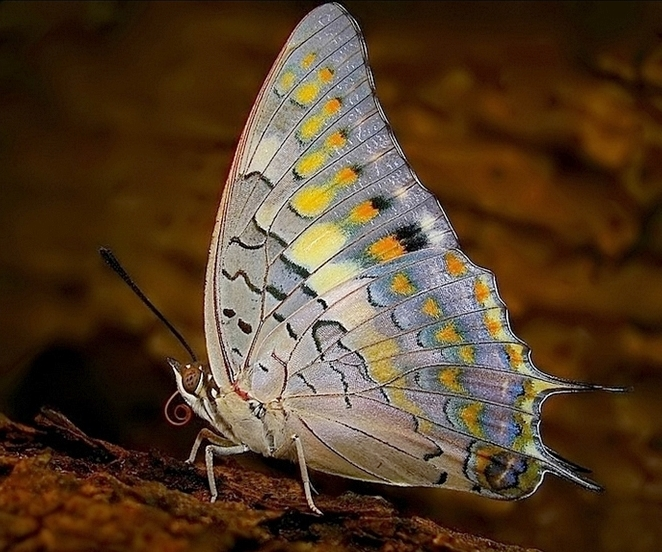
On Millettia pinnata at Mahim Nature Park in Mumbai, India

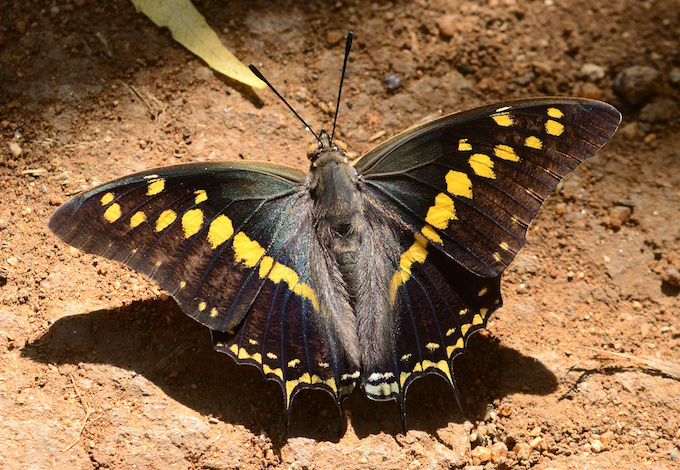
Upper side
