= 3-Phenylcoumarin =

Chemical compound

Names
- IUPAC name Isoflav-3-en-2-one
- Systematic IUPAC name 3-Phenyl-2H-1-benzopyran-2-one
- Other names 3-phenyl-2H-chromen-2-one

Identifiers
CAS Number	955-10-2
3D model (JSmol)	Interactive image
ChEMBL	ChEMBL510349
ChemSpider	63565
ECHA InfoCard	100.012.248
EC Number	213-473-5
PubChem CID	70385
UNII	WV24YNY4AU
CompTox Dashboard (EPA)	DTXSID50241860
- InChI: InChI=1S/C15H10O2/c16-15-13(11-6-2-1-3-7-11)10-12-8-4-5-9-14(12)17-15/h1-10H Key: HWDSXZLYIKESML-UHFFFAOYSA-N
- SMILES: C1=CC=C(C=C1)C2=CC3=CC=CC=C3OC2=O

Properties
Chemical formula	C_{15}H_{10}O_{2}
Molar mass	222.243 g·mol^{−1}

Structure
Crystal structure	Monoclinic

Hazards
- GHS labelling
Pictograms	(GHS07: Exclamation mark)
Signal word	Warning
Hazard statements	H302
Precautionary statements	P264, P270, P301+P312+P330, P501
Safety data sheet (SDS)	Sigma-Aldrich
- Except where otherwise noted, data are given for materials in their standard state (at 25 °C [77 °F], 100 kPa). Infobox references

3-Phenylcoumarin or 3-phenylchromen-2-one is a chemical compound that has the molecular formula C_{15}H_{10}O_{2}. A member of the coumarin compound family, its derivatives have been investigated for pharmacological applications, including in enzyme inhibition and as anticancer agents.

== Synthesis ==
3-Phenylcoumarins have been synthesized through various means, starting with different precursors and catalysts with goals of achieving better yield, different conditions of the final product for producing derivatives, ease of purification, lower toxicity or environmental impact, or other considerations. One synthetic method is done via Perkin reaction in dimethyl sulfoxide from methoxy-substituted phenylacetic acid and methoxy- or ethoxy-substituted salicylaldehyde using the dehydrating agent dicyclohexylcarbodiimide.
