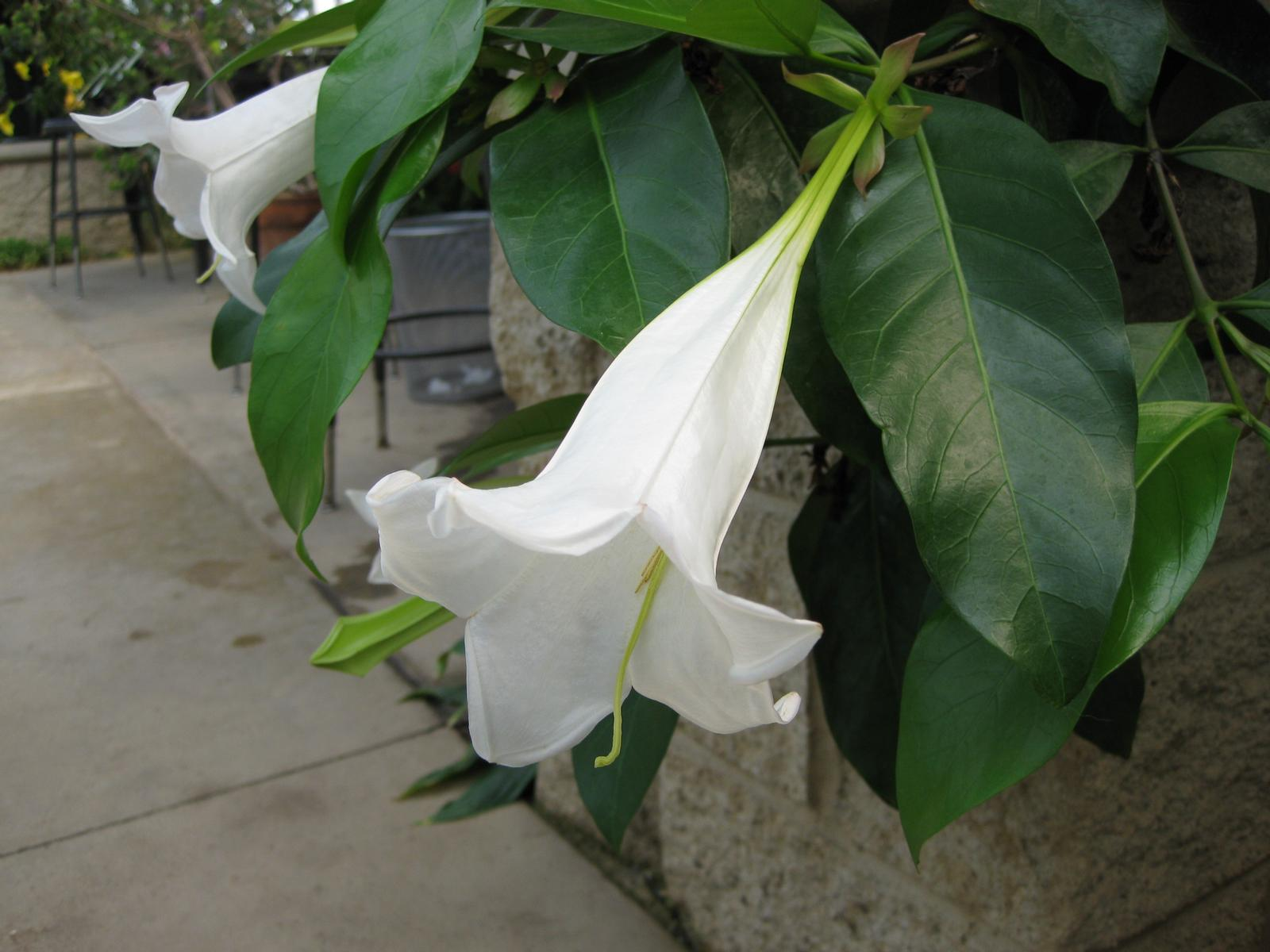
- Portlandia grandiflora

Scientific classification
- Kingdom: Plantae
- Clade: Tracheophytes
- Clade: Angiosperms
- Clade: Eudicots
- Clade: Asterids
- Order: Gentianales
- Family: Rubiaceae
- Subfamily: Cinchonoideae
- Tribe: Chiococceae
- Genus: Portlandia; P.Browne

Species
- See text.

= Portlandia (plant) =

Genus of plants

Portlandia is a genus of flowering plants in the coffee family, Rubiaceae. Members of the genus are endemic to Jamaica.

== Species ==
As of March 2023, Plants of the World Online accepted the following species:

- Portlandia coccinea Sw.
- Portlandia grandiflora L.
- Portlandia harrisii Britton
- Portlandia microsepala Urb.
- Portlandia platantha Hook.f.
- Portlandia proctorii (Aiello) Delprete

=== Formerly placed here ===
- Portlandia albiflora Britton & Harris ex Standl. = Portlandia platantha Hook.f.
- Portlandia domingensis Britton = Cubanola domingensis (Britton) Aiello
- Portlandia hexandra Jacq. = Coutarea hexandra (Jacq.) K.Schum.
- Portlandia pterosperma S.Watson = Hintonia latiflora (DC.) Bullock
- Portlandia speciosa Baill. = Coutarea hexandra (Jacq.) K.Schum.
