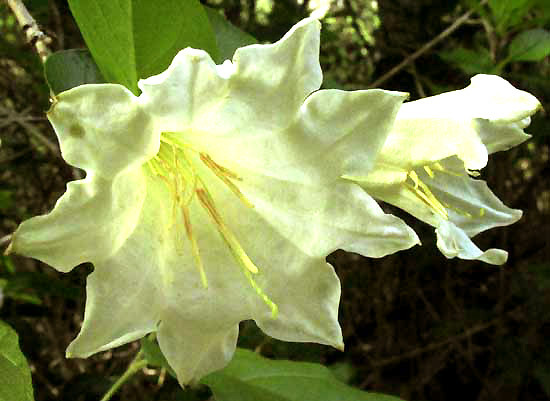
- Hintonia octomera flower

Scientific classification
- Kingdom: Plantae
- Clade: Tracheophytes
- Clade: Angiosperms
- Clade: Eudicots
- Clade: Asterids
- Order: Gentianales
- Family: Rubiaceae
- Genus: Hintonia
- Species: H. octomera

Binomial name
- Hintonia octomera (Hemsl.) Bullock, 1935

Synonyms
- Coutarea octomera Hemsl. (1850); Coutarea acamptoclada B.L.Rob. & Millsp. 1905

= Hintonia octomera =

Species of plant

Hintonia octomera is a species of flowering plant belonging to the family Rubiaceae.

== Description ==
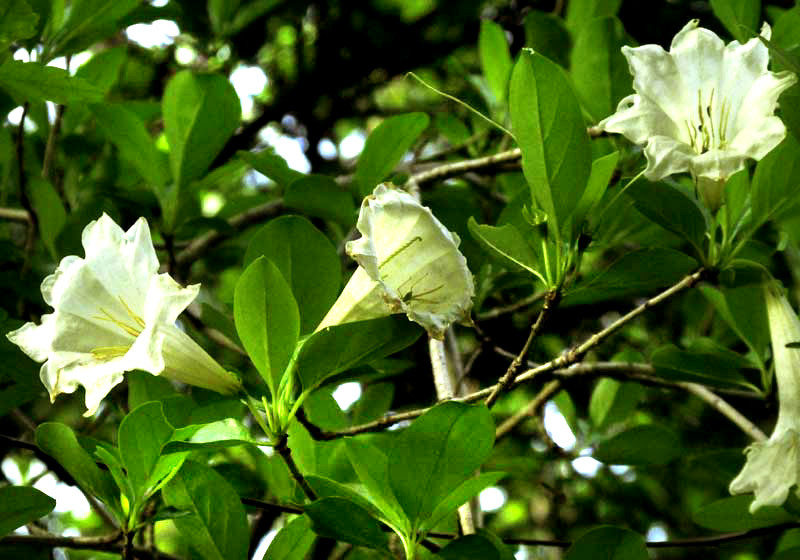
Hintonia octomera flowers and leaves clustered on short side branches

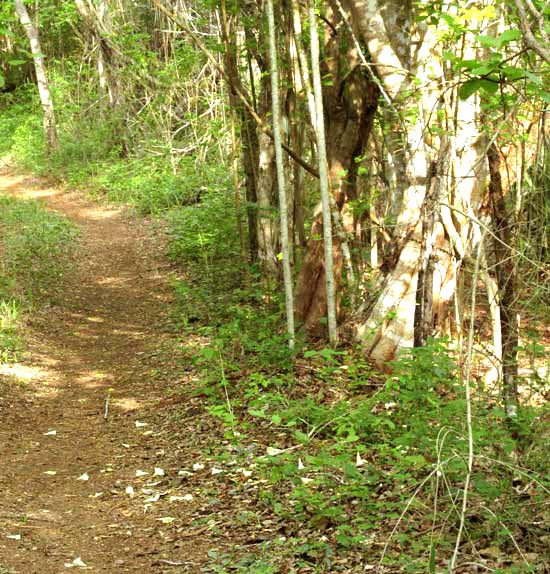
Hintonia octomera flowers fallen onto forest trail

Hintonia octomera is a shrub, small tree or woody climber up to 7 metres (23 ft) tall. Above its main stem's first long section between joints, it develops short branches issuing at wide angles in such a way that they entangle with other vegetation, providing the relatively slender central stem support as it grows upwards. These side branches end in short, slow-growing spurs (brachyblasts), often bearing clustered leaves, flowers or fruit. The leaves, arising in pairs opposite one another, are elliptical, and up to 5 cm (2.0 in) long and 3.5 cm (1.4 in) wide with tips ending abruptly in small, sharp points.

The stem features are important for identification in the field, because often the plant is not noticed until its large flowers fall onto the forest floor. Here are some of the flowers' distinctive features shared with other Hintonia species:

- Flowers appear singly or up to three blossoms in leaf axils and at branch tips.
- Flowers are relatively large and showy, their corollas shaped like megaphones.
- Stamens have relatively long, slender filaments attaching to the anther bases, and anther tops usually do not extend beyond the corolla's mouth.
- Styles are slender, at their tips shallowly divided into two parts.
- Flowers of Hintonia octomera are quite similar to other Hintonia species, except that their corolla tubes separate into 8 sharp-pointed, petal-like lobes, not 6.

== Distribution ==
Hintonia latiflora is native to southeastern Mexico, including Cozumel Island, into Guatemala.

== Habitat ==
Hintonia octomera occurs in primary forest and Secondary forest, mainly under shade, in low-growing to medium-height forest partly with deciduous tree species, as well as among coastal dunes. Photos on this page were taken in a tropical moist broadleaf forest as defined by the World Wide Fund for Nature (WWF) in Mexico's Yucatán state, where there is a distinct, long-term dry season during part of the year.

== Traditional uses ==
In Mexico's Yucatan Peninsula, leaves and bark are used to treat pernicious and intermittent fevers such as those of malaria. The wood has been employed to hook the harnesses of horses, and the fibrous outer bark to tie horse saddles. The flowers are used for the production of honey. Also in the Yucatán, a disease the Maya people refer to as chich-nak, consisting of sadness and restlessness, and often seen in women with many children, has been successfully treated with a tea of Hintonia octomera (cited as Coutarea octomera in the document), combined with parts of the Mexican Poppy.

== Taxonomy ==
Within the large family Rubiaceae, Hintonia octomera occupies the subfamily Dialypetalanthoideae and the tribe Chiococceae

In 1887 when William Hemsle first described this taxon, as Coutarea octomera, he remarked that "Gaumer," (George Franklin Gaumer), who in the Yucatán collected and distributed to botanists many plants which were new to science, stated that the species was "very rare: flowers greenish yellow". Greenish-yellow flowers are reported by several authors, but as pictures on this page show, the flowers are white with a yellow throat.

=== Phylogeny ===
Molecular phylogenetic analysis confirms that Hintonia octomera is sister to the other two generally accepted Hintonia species, and that the three species form a clade, which is monophyletic, within the Exostema-Solenandra-Coutarea-Hintonia Group, or clade. Within that clade, Hintonia species demonstrate a close relationship with the genus Coutarea, as conceived of since 1996.

== Etymology ==
The genus Hintonia was named after George Boole Hinton (1882–1943), a botanical collector born in London, England, and who collected many new species in Mexico.

The species name octomera is from the Greek octo- meaning "eight", and the Greek meris meaning "part". Thus "eight parts", referring to the eight petal-like corolla lobes distinguishing Hintonia octomera from other Hintonia species.
