= Hintonia (plant) =

Scientific classification
- Kingdom: Plantae
- Clade: Tracheophytes
- Clade: Angiosperms
- Clade: Eudicots
- Clade: Asterids
- Order: Gentianales
- Family: Rubiaceae
- Subfamily: Cinchonoideae
- Tribe: Chiococceae
- Genus: Hintonia; Bullock

species
- See text.

Genus of plants

Hintonia is a plant genus in the family Rubiaceae.

== Species ==
- Hintonia latiflora
- Hintonia lumaeana
- Hintonia octomera
- Hintonia pulchra (now Osa pulchra)
- Hintonia standleyana
