= Schmidtottia involucrata =

Scientific classification
- Kingdom: Plantae
- Clade: Tracheophytes
- Clade: Angiosperms
- Clade: Eudicots
- Clade: Asterids
- Order: Gentianales
- Family: Rubiaceae
- Subfamily: Cinchonoideae
- Tribe: Chiococceae
- Genus: Schmidtottia
- Species: S. involucrata

Binomial name
- Schmidtottia involucrata (Wernham) Alain (1959)

Synonyms
- Ceuthocarpus involucratus (Wernham) Aiello (1979); Portlandia involucrata Wernham (1913)

Genus of plants

Schmidtottia involucrata is a species of flowering plant in the family Rubiaceae. It is a shrub or tree endemic to eastern Cuba.
