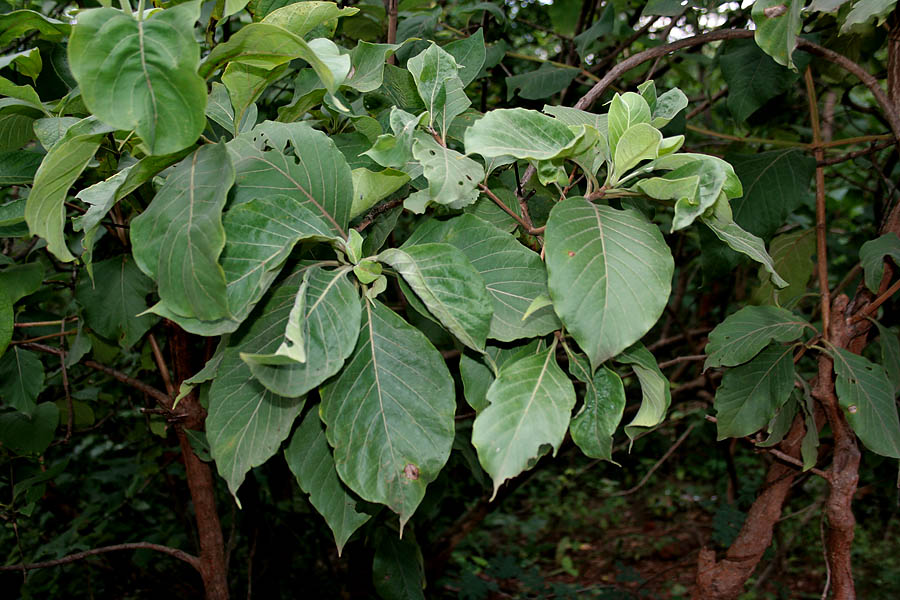

Scientific classification
- Kingdom: Plantae
- Clade: Tracheophytes
- Clade: Angiosperms
- Clade: Eudicots
- Clade: Asterids
- Order: Gentianales
- Family: Rubiaceae
- Subfamily: Cinchonoideae
- Tribe: Hymenodictyeae
- Genus: Hymenodictyon; Wall.

Type species
- Hymenodictyon orixense (Roxb.) Mabb.

Species
- ~ 30 species, see text

= Hymenodictyon =

Genus of flowering plants

Hymenodictyon is a genus of flowering plants in the family Rubiaceae. It has about 30 species. All are native to the Old World. The wood of Hymenodictyon orixense is soft and has limited use, mostly for boxes. The type species for Hymenodictyon is Hymenodictyon orixense (synonym: Hymenodictyon excelsum).

Hymenodictyon was named by Nathaniel Wallich in 1824 in an addendum to William Roxburgh's Flora Indica, in an edition published by Carey and Wallich after Roxburgh's death. The generic name is derived from two Greek words, hymen, "membrane", and diktyon, "net". It refers to the wing that surrounds each seed.

Molecular phylogenetic studies have shown that Hymenodictyon is paraphyletic over the Madagascan genus Paracorynanthe.

In Hymenodictyon and Paracorynanthe, the stipules bear large deciduous glands called colleters. The corolla tube is narrow at the base, gradually widening toward the apex. The fruit is a woody capsule.

== Species ==
As of March 2023, Plants of the World Online accepted the following species:

- Hymenodictyon antakaranensis Razafim. & B.Bremer
- Hymenodictyon austroafricanum J.E.Burrows & S.M.Burrows
- Hymenodictyon berivotrense Cavaco
- Hymenodictyon biafranum Hiern
- Hymenodictyon decaryi Homolle
- Hymenodictyon embergeri Cavaco
- Hymenodictyon epiphyticum Razafim. & B.Bremer
- Hymenodictyon fimbriolatum K.Schum. ex De Wild.
- Hymenodictyon flaccidum Wall.
- Hymenodictyon floribundum (Hochst. & Steud.) B.L.Rob.
- Hymenodictyon glabrum (Cavaco) Razafim. & B.Bremer
- Hymenodictyon horsfieldii Miq.
- Hymenodictyon kaokoensis Swanepoel & van Jaarsv.
- Hymenodictyon leandrii Cavaco
- Hymenodictyon louhavate Homolle
- Hymenodictyon madagascaricum Baill. ex Razafim. & B.Bremer
- Hymenodictyon obovatum Wall.
- Hymenodictyon occidentale Homolle
- Hymenodictyon orixense (Roxb.) Mabb.
- Hymenodictyon pachyantha K.Krause
- Hymenodictyon parvifolium Oliv.
- Hymenodictyon perrieri Drake
- Hymenodictyon scabrum Stapf
- Hymenodictyon septentrionale Cavaco
- Hymenodictyon seyrigii Cavaco
- Hymenodictyon timoranum (Span.) Miq.
- Hymenodictyon tsingy Razafim. & B.Bremer
