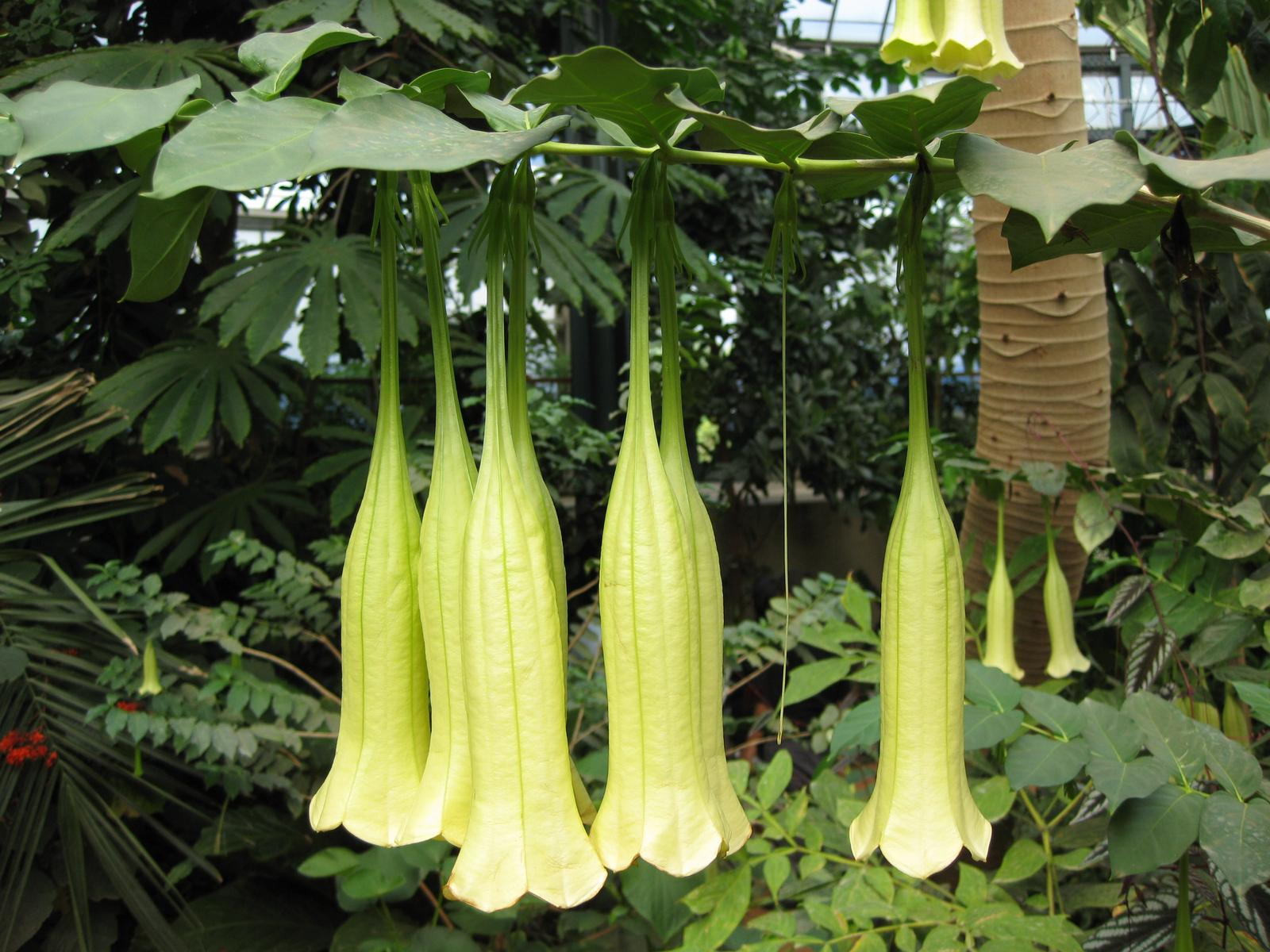
- Cubanola domingensis

Scientific classification
- Kingdom: Plantae
- Clade: Tracheophytes
- Clade: Angiosperms
- Clade: Eudicots
- Clade: Asterids
- Order: Gentianales
- Family: Rubiaceae
- Subfamily: Cinchonoideae
- Tribe: Chiococceae
- Genus: Cubanola; Aiello

Type species
- Cubanola daphnoides (Graham) Aiello

Synonyms
- Gonianthes A.Rich.

= Cubanola =

Genus of plants

Cubanola is a genus of flowering plants in the family Rubiaceae, with large, showy, hanging flowers. They are endemic to the Dominican Republic and eastern Cuba.

== Species ==
- Cubanola domingensis (Britton) Aiello - Dominican Republic
- Cubanola daphnoides (Graham) Aiello - Cuba
