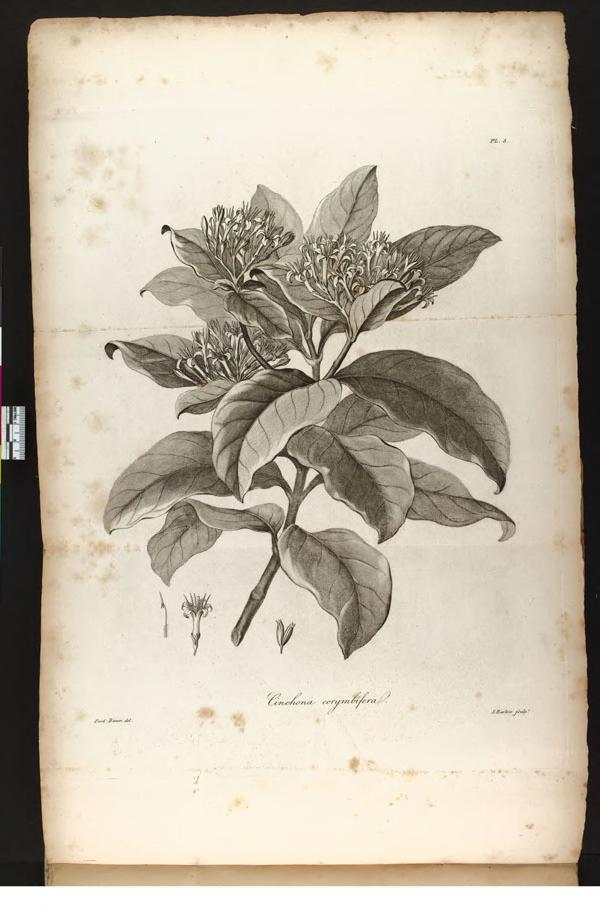
- 1797 botanical illustration of then Cinchona corymbifera, now a synonym of Badusa corymbifera

Scientific classification
- Kingdom: Plantae
- Clade: Tracheophytes
- Clade: Angiosperms
- Clade: Eudicots
- Clade: Asterids
- Order: Gentianales
- Family: Rubiaceae
- Subfamily: Cinchonoideae
- Tribe: Chiococceae
- Genus: Badusa; A.Gray

Type species
- Badusa corymbifera A.Gray

Synonyms
- Bathysograya Kuntze

= Badusa =

Genus of plants

Badusa is a genus of flowering plants in the family Rubiaceae. It was described by Asa Gray in 1860. The genus is native to the Philippines (Palawan), New Guinea, and some islands of the West Pacific (Solomons, Fiji, Santa Cruz, Tonga, Vanuatu, and Palau).

== Species ==
- Badusa corymbifera A.Gray - New Guinea, Solomons, Fiji, Santa Cruz, Tonga, Vanuatu
  - Badusa corymbifera subsp. biakensis Ridsdale - New Guinea
  - Badusa corymbifera subsp. corymbifera - Solomons, Fiji, Santa Cruz, Tonga, Vanuatu
- Badusa palauensis Valeton - Palau (Micronesia)
- Badusa palawanensis Ridsdale - Palawan (Philippines)
