= Scolosanthus =

Scientific classification
- Kingdom: Plantae
- Clade: Tracheophytes
- Clade: Angiosperms
- Clade: Eudicots
- Clade: Asterids
- Order: Gentianales
- Family: Rubiaceae
- Subfamily: Cinchonoideae
- Tribe: Chiococceae
- Genus: Scolosanthus

Species
- See text.

Genus of plants

Scolosanthus is a genus of flowering plants in the coffee family, Rubiaceae.

Species include:

- Scolosanthus acanthodes
- Scolosanthus acunae
- Scolosanthus bahamensis
- Scolosanthus crucifer
- Scolosanthus ekmanii
- Scolosanthus grandifolius – espuela de galan
- Scolosanthus howardii Borhidi
- Scolosanthus leonardii
- Scolosanthus liogieri
- Scolosanthus lucidus
- Scolosanthus maestrensis
- Scolosanthus moanus
- Scolosanthus multiflorus
- Scolosanthus portoricensis – maricao
- Scolosanthus selleanus
- Scolosanthus strictus
- Scolosanthus subsessilis
- Scolosanthus triacanthus
- Scolosanthus versicolor – Puerto Rico devilbrush
- Scolosanthus wrightianus
