= Isidorea =

Scientific classification
- Kingdom: Plantae
- Clade: Tracheophytes
- Clade: Angiosperms
- Clade: Eudicots
- Clade: Asterids
- Order: Gentianales
- Family: Rubiaceae
- Subfamily: Cinchonoideae
- Tribe: Chiococceae
- Genus: Isidorea; A.Rich. ex DC.

Genus of plants

Isidorea is a genus of flowering plants in the family Rubiaceae. It is endemic to the islands of Cuba and Hispaniola (the Dominican Republic and Haiti) in the Caribbean.

== Species ==
- Isidorea acunae (Borhidi) Borhidi
- Isidorea brachyantha Urb.
- Isidorea brachycarpa (Urb.) Aiello
- Isidorea elliptica Alain
- Isidorea gonavensis Aiello & Borhidi
- Isidorea leonardii Urb.
- Isidorea leonis Alain
- Isidorea leptantha Urb.
- Isidorea microphylla Borhidi
- Isidorea oblanceolata (Urb.) Aiello
- Isidorea ophiticola (Borhidi) Borhidi
- Isidorea pedicellaris Urb. & Ekman
- Isidorea polyneura (Urb.) Aiello
- Isidorea pungens (Lam.) B.L.Rob.
- Isidorea rheedioides Borhidi
- Isidorea tetramera Urb. & Ekman
- Isidorea veris Ekman ex Aiello & Borhidi
