= Ceratopyxis =

Scientific classification
- Kingdom: Plantae
- Clade: Tracheophytes
- Clade: Angiosperms
- Clade: Eudicots
- Clade: Asterids
- Order: Gentianales
- Family: Rubiaceae
- Subfamily: Cinchonoideae
- Tribe: Chiococceae
- Genus: Ceratopyxis; Hook.f.
- Species: C. verbenaceae

Binomial name
- Ceratopyxis verbenaceae (Griseb.) Hook.f.

Synonyms
- Rondeletia verbenacea Griseb.; Phialanthus spicatus C.Wright

Genus of plants

Ceratopyxis is a monotypic genus of flowering plants in the family Rubiaceae. The genus contains only one species, viz. Ceratopyxis verbenaceae, which is endemic to Cuba. It is a resinous small tree or bush with 4.5-8 centimeter oblong leaves. The fruit it produces is 4-5 millimeters in diameter, and with small hairs attached to the skin.
