= Phialanthus =

Scientific classification
- Kingdom: Plantae
- Clade: Embryophytes
- Clade: Tracheophytes
- Clade: Angiosperms
- Clade: Eudicots
- Clade: Asterids
- Order: Gentianales
- Family: Rubiaceae
- Subfamily: Cinchonoideae
- Tribe: Chiococceae
- Genus: Phialanthus; Griseb.

Species
- See text

Genus of plants

Phialanthus is a genus of flowering plants in the family Rubiaceae. There are about 20 species, 17 of which occur in Cuba.

Species include:

- Phialanthus acunae
- Phialanthus alainii
- Phialanthus bissei
- Phialanthus ellipticus
- Phialanthus glaberrimus
- Phialanthus grandifolius
- Phialanthus guantanamensis
- Phialanthus hispaniolae
- Phialanthus inflatus
- Phialanthus jamaicensis Urb.
- Phialanthus linearis
- Phialanthus macrocalyx
- Phialanthus macrostemon
- Phialanthus marianus
- Phialanthus myrtilloides
- Phialanthus oblongatus
- Phialanthus parvifolius
- Phialanthus peduncularis
- Phialanthus resinifluus
- Phialanthus revolutus Urb.
- Phialanthus rigidus
- Phialanthus stillans
