= Nernstia =

Scientific classification
- Kingdom: Plantae
- Clade: Tracheophytes
- Clade: Angiosperms
- Clade: Eudicots
- Clade: Asterids
- Order: Gentianales
- Family: Rubiaceae
- Subfamily: Cinchonoideae
- Tribe: Chiococceae
- Genus: Nernstia; Urb.
- Species: N. mexicana

Binomial name
- Nernstia mexicana (Zucc. & Mart. ex DC.) Urb.

Synonyms
- Cigarrilla Aiello

Genus of plants

Nernstia is a monotypic genus of flowering plants in the family Rubiaceae. It was described by Ignatz Urban in 1923.

The genus name of Nernstia is in honour of Walther Hermann Nernst (1864–1941), who was a German chemist known for his work in thermodynamics, physical chemistry, electrochemistry, and solid state physics.

The genus contains only one species, i.e. Nernstia mexicana (Zucc. & Mart. ex DC.) Urb., which is endemic to north-eastern Mexico.
