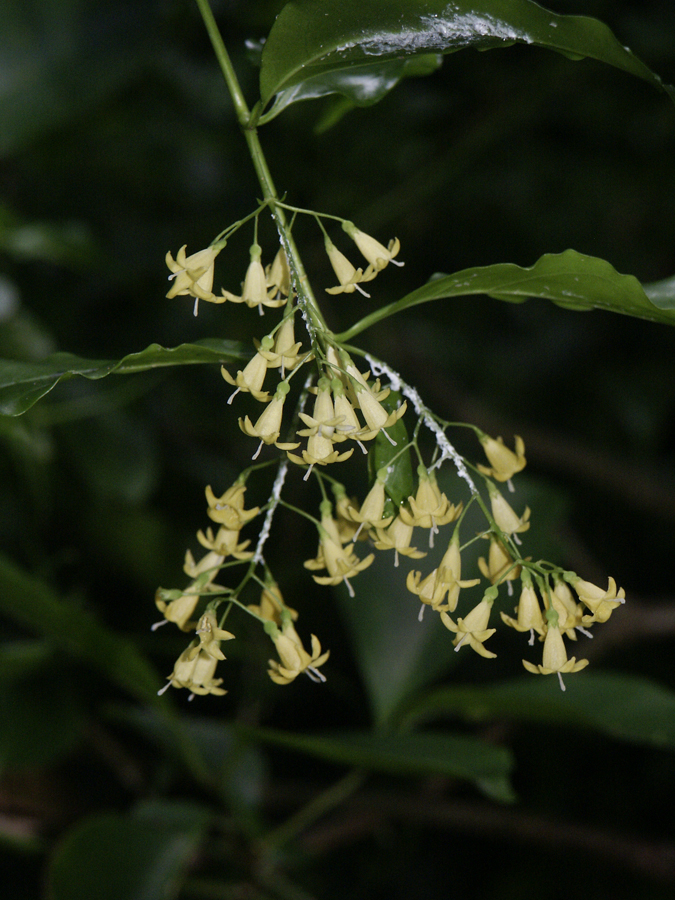
- Chiococca alba

Scientific classification
- Kingdom: Plantae
- Clade: Tracheophytes
- Clade: Angiosperms
- Clade: Eudicots
- Clade: Asterids
- Order: Gentianales
- Family: Rubiaceae
- Subfamily: Cinchonoideae
- Tribe: Chiococceae; Benth. & Hook.f.

Type genus
- Chiococca P.Browne

Synonyms
- Catesbaeeae Hook.f.

= Chiococceae =

Tribe of plants

Chiococceae is a tribe of flowering plants in the family Rubiaceae which contains about 233 species in 27 genera. Most representatives occur from southern Florida to tropical and subtropical Central America, except for the genera Badusa and Bikkia, which are found from the Philippines to the West Pacific, and Morierina and Thiollierea, which are native to New Caledonia. The tribe Catesbaeeae is now included within Chiococceae.

== Genera ==
Currently accepted names

- Badusa A.Gray (3 sp)
- Bikkia Reinw. ex Blume (10 sp)
- Catesbaea L. (17 sp)
- Ceratopyxis Hook.f. (1 sp)
- Ceuthocarpus Aiello (1 sp)
- Chiococca P.Browne (25 sp)
- Coutaportla Urb. (3 sp)
- Coutarea Aubl. (6 sp)
- Cubanola Aiello (2 sp)
- Eosanthe Urb. (1 sp)
- Erithalis P.Browne (8 sp)
- Exostema (Pers.) Rich. ex Humb. & Bonpl. (43 sp)
- Hintonia Bullock (3 sp)
- Isidorea A.Rich ex DC. (17 sp)
- Morierina Vieill. (2 sp)
- Nernstia Urb. (1 sp)
- Osa Aiello (1 sp)
- Phialanthus Griseb. (22 sp)
- Portlandia P.Browne (6 sp)
- Salzmannia DC. (4 species)
- Schmidtottia Urb. (15 sp)
- Scolosanthus Vahl (27 sp)
- Shaferocharis Urb. (3 sp)
- Siemensia Urb. (1 sp)
- Solenandra Hook.f. (21 spp.)
- Thogsennia Aiello (1 sp)
- Thiollierea Montrouz. (12 sp)

Synonyms

- Antacanthus Rich. ex DC. = Scolosanthus
- Asemnantha Hook.f. = Chiococca
- Bathysograya Kuntze = Badusa
- Bikkiopsis Brongn. & Gris = Bikkia
- Cormigonus Raf. = Bikkia
- Cutaria Brign. = Coutarea
- Dolichanthera Schltr. & K.Krause = Morierina
- Echinodendrum A.Rich. = Scolosanthus
- Gonianthes Rich. = Cubanola
- Herrera Adans. = Exostema
- Lorencea Borhidi = Coutaportla
- Solenandra Hook.f. = Exostema
- Steudelago Kuntze = Exostema
