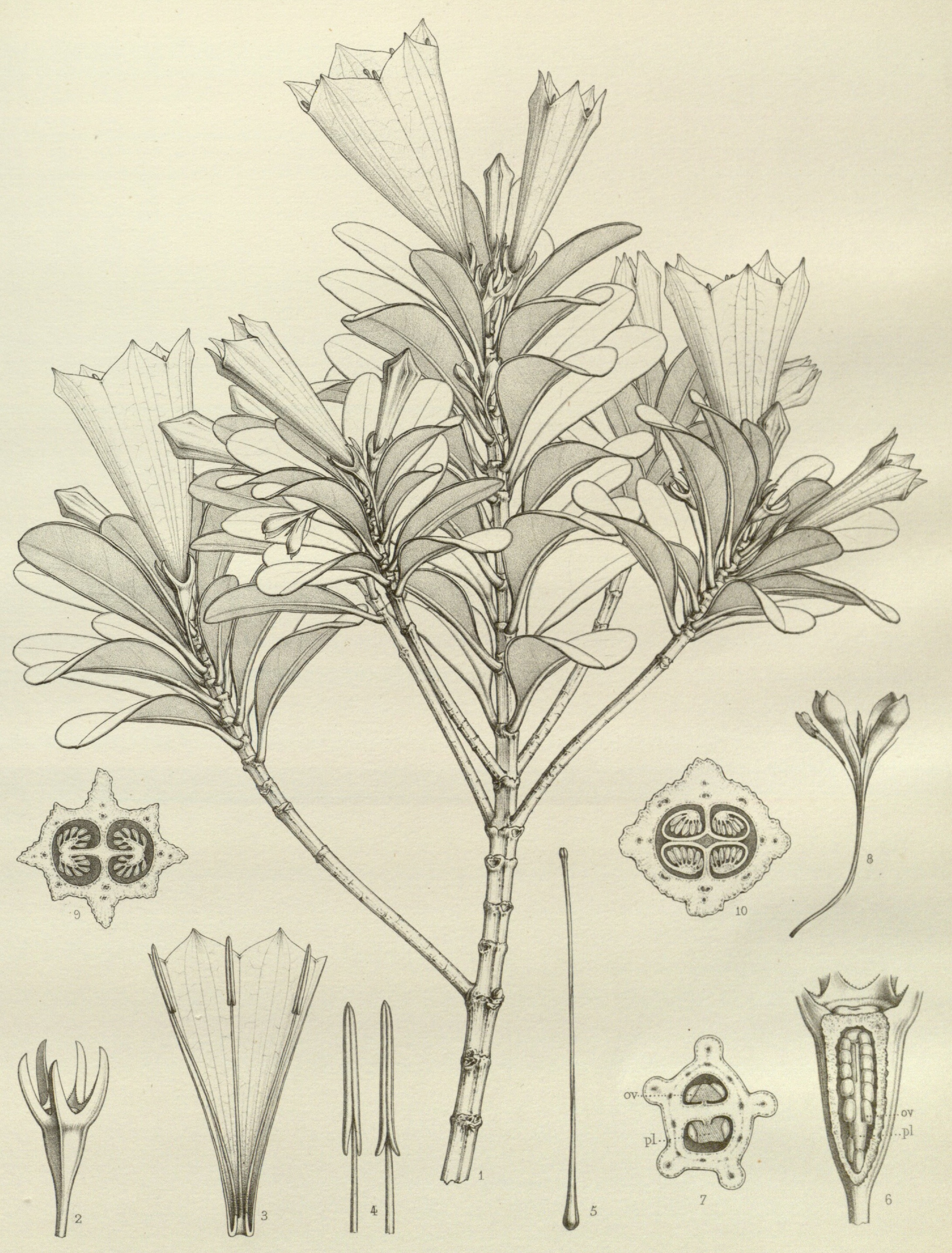
- Thiollierea campanulata

Scientific classification
- Kingdom: Plantae
- Clade: Tracheophytes
- Clade: Angiosperms
- Clade: Eudicots
- Clade: Asterids
- Order: Gentianales
- Family: Rubiaceae
- Subfamily: Cinchonoideae
- Tribe: Chiococceae
- Genus: Thiollierea; Montrouz.

Synonyms
- Morierina Vieill.

= Thiollierea =

Genus of plants

Thiollierea is a genus of shrubs in the family Rubiaceae. The genus is endemic to New Caledonia in the Pacific and contains 16 species which used to be placed in the genera Bikkia or Morierina

== List of species ==
- Thiollierea artensis
- Thiollierea campanulata
- Thiollierea dagostinii
- Thiollierea kaalaensis
- Thiollierea laureana
- Thiollierea lenormandii
- Thiollierea macrophylla
- Thiollierea montana
- Thiollierea naounarum
- Thiollierea pachyphylla
- Thiollierea papineaui
- Thiollierea parviflora
- Thiollierea propinqua
- Thiollierea retusiflora
- Thiollierea rigaultii
- Thiollierea tubiflora
