= Coutaportla =

Scientific classification
- Kingdom: Plantae
- Clade: Tracheophytes
- Clade: Angiosperms
- Clade: Eudicots
- Clade: Asterids
- Order: Gentianales
- Family: Rubiaceae
- Subfamily: Cinchonoideae
- Tribe: Chiococceae
- Genus: Coutaportla; Urb.

Type species
- Coutaportla ghiesbreghtiana Urb.

Synonyms
- Lorencea Borhidi

Genus of plants

Coutaportla is a genus of flowering plants in the family Rubiaceae. It is found in Mexico and Guatemala.

== Species ==
- Coutaportla ghiesbreghtiana (Baill.) Urb. - Puebla, Oaxaca
- Coutaportla guatemalensis (Standl.) Lorence - Veracruz, Chiapas, Guatemala
- Coutaportla pailensis Villarreal - Coahuila
