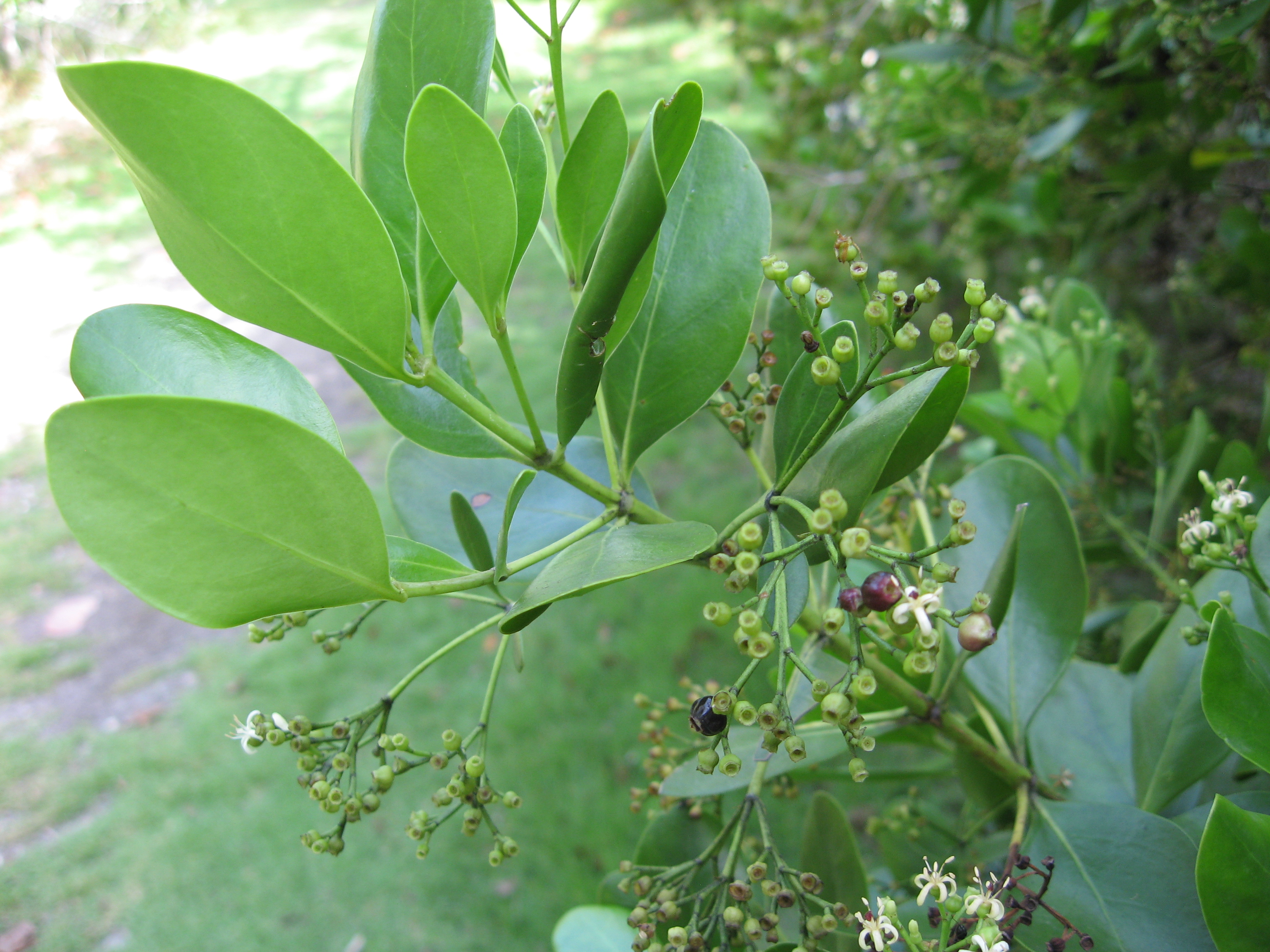
- Erithalis fruticosa

Scientific classification
- Kingdom: Plantae
- Clade: Tracheophytes
- Clade: Angiosperms
- Clade: Eudicots
- Clade: Asterids
- Order: Gentianales
- Family: Rubiaceae
- Subfamily: Cinchonoideae
- Tribe: Chiococceae
- Genus: Erithalis; P.Browne

Synonyms
- Herrera Adans.

= Erithalis =

Genus of plants

Erithalis is a genus of flowering plants in the family Rubiaceae. The genus is found from southern Florida to tropical America.

== Species ==
Ten species are accepted.

- Erithalis angustifolia DC.
- Erithalis diffusa Correll
- Erithalis fruticosa L.
- Erithalis harrisii Urb.
- Erithalis insularis (Ridl.) Zappi & T.S.Nunes
- Erithalis odorifera Jacq.
- Erithalis orbiculata (Proctor) A.R.Franck, P.A.Lewis & Oberli
- Erithalis quadrangularis Krug & Urb.
- Erithalis salmeoides Correll
- Erithalis vacciniifolia (Griseb.) C.Wright
