= Thogsennia =

Scientific classification
- Kingdom: Plantae
- Clade: Tracheophytes
- Clade: Angiosperms
- Clade: Eudicots
- Clade: Asterids
- Order: Gentianales
- Family: Rubiaceae
- Subfamily: Cinchonoideae
- Tribe: Chiococceae
- Genus: Thogsennia; Aiello

Genus of flowering plants

Thogsennia is a genus of flowering plants belonging to the family Rubiaceae.

Its native range is Cuba to Hispaniola.

Species:

- Thogsennia lindeniana (A.Rich.) Aiello
