= Eosanthe =

Scientific classification
- Kingdom: Plantae
- Clade: Tracheophytes
- Clade: Angiosperms
- Clade: Eudicots
- Clade: Asterids
- Order: Gentianales
- Family: Rubiaceae
- Subfamily: Cinchonoideae
- Tribe: Chiococceae
- Genus: Eosanthe; Urb.
- Species: E. cubensis

Binomial name
- Eosanthe cubensis Urb.

Genus of plants

Eosanthe is a monotypic genus of flowering plants in the family Rubiaceae. The genus contains only one species, viz. Eosanthe cubensis, which is endemic to Sierra Cristal National Park, in Cuba.

The genus name of Eosanthe is in reference to the goddess from Greek mythology, Eos.

The genus was circumscribed by Ignaz Urban in Symb. Antill. (Urban) Vol.9 (Issue 1) on page 162 in 1923.
