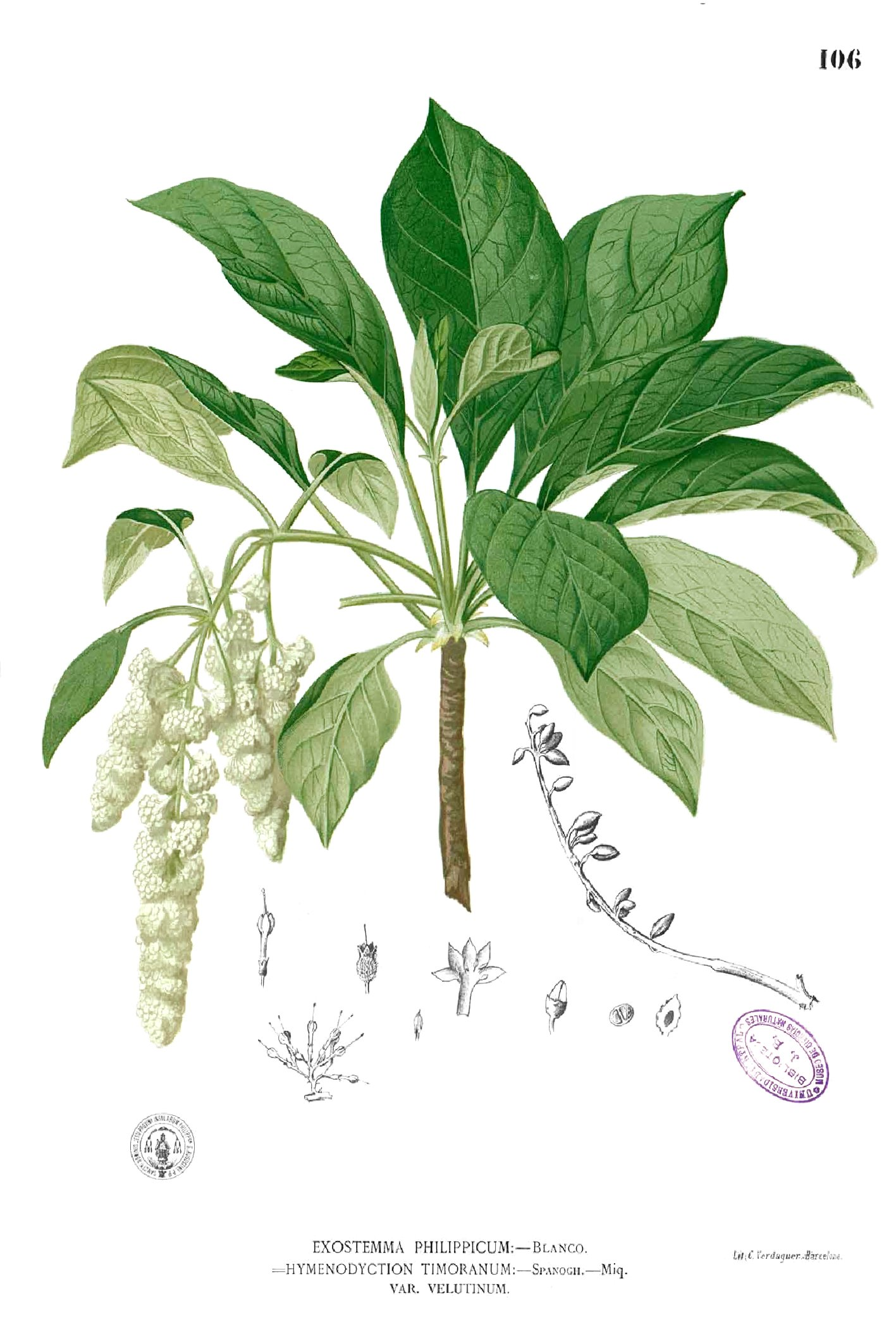
- Hymenodictyon timoranum

Scientific classification
- Kingdom: Plantae
- Clade: Tracheophytes
- Clade: Angiosperms
- Clade: Eudicots
- Clade: Asterids
- Order: Gentianales
- Family: Rubiaceae
- Subfamily: Cinchonoideae
- Tribe: Hymenodictyeae; Razafim. & B.Bremer

Type genus
- Hymenodictyon Wall.

Genera
- See text

= Hymenodictyeae =

Tribe of plants

Hymenodictyeae is a tribe of flowering plants in the family Rubiaceae and contains about 25 species in two genera. The representatives of the genus Hymenodictyon are found in tropical and southern Africa, Madagascar, to tropical Asia and China (Yunnan). The two species of Paracorynanthe are restricted to Madagascar.

== Genera ==
Currently accepted names:

- Hymenodictyon Wall. (23 spp.)
- Paracorynanthe Capuron (2 spp.)

Synonyms:

- Benteca Adans. = Hymenodictyon
- Kurria Hochst. & Steud. = Hymenodictyon
