= Schmidtottia =

Scientific classification
- Kingdom: Plantae
- Clade: Embryophytes
- Clade: Tracheophytes
- Clade: Angiosperms
- Clade: Eudicots
- Clade: Asterids
- Order: Gentianales
- Family: Rubiaceae
- Subfamily: Cinchonoideae
- Tribe: Chiococceae
- Genus: Schmidtottia; Urb.

Species
- See text

Synonyms
- Ceuthocarpus Aiello

Genus of flowering plants

Schmidtottia is a genus of flowering plants in the family Rubiaceae, native to eastern Cuba. Adapted to serpentine soils, they are nickel hyperaccumulators.

== Species ==
Currently accepted species include:

- Schmidtottia corymbosa Borhidi
- Schmidtottia cubensis (Standl.) Urb.
- Schmidtottia cucullata Borhidi
- Schmidtottia elliptica (Britton) Urb.
- Schmidtottia involucrata (Wernham) Alain
- Schmidtottia marmorata Urb.
- Schmidtottia monantha Urb.
- Schmidtottia monticola Borhidi
- Schmidtottia multiflora Urb.
- Schmidtottia neglecta (Borhidi) Borhidi
- Schmidtottia nitens (Britton) Urb.
- Schmidtottia parvifolia Alain
- Schmidtottia scabra Borhidi & Acuña
- Schmidtottia sessilifolia (Britton) Urb.
- Schmidtottia shaferi (Standl.) Urb.
- Schmidtottia stricta Borhidi
- Schmidtottia uliginosa (Wernham) Urb.
