= Solenandra =

Scientific classification
- Kingdom: Plantae
- Clade: Tracheophytes
- Clade: Angiosperms
- Clade: Eudicots
- Clade: Asterids
- Order: Gentianales
- Family: Rubiaceae
- Subfamily: Cinchonoideae
- Tribe: Chiococceae
- Genus: Solenandra; Hook.f.

Species
- See text.

Genus of plants

Solenandra is a genus of flowering plant in the family Rubiaceae, native from Mexico to Central America and the Caribbean. The genus was established by Joseph Dalton Hooker in 1873.

== Species ==
As of January 2023, Plants of the World Online accepted the following species:

- Solenandra angustifolia (Sw.) Paudyal & Delprete
- Solenandra brachycarpa (Sw.) Paudyal & Delprete
- Solenandra cordata (Borhidi & M.Fernández) Borhidi
- Solenandra curbeloi (Borhidi & M.Fernández) Borhidi
- Solenandra elliptica (Griseb.) Paudyal & Delprete
- Solenandra ixoroides Hook.f.
- Solenandra lineata (Vahl) Paudyal & Delprete
- Solenandra longiflora (Lamb.) Paudyal & Delprete
- Solenandra mexicana (A.Gray) Borhidi
- Solenandra microcarpa (Borhidi & M.Fernández) Borhidi
- Solenandra myrtifolia (Griseb.) Borhidi
- Solenandra parviflora (A.Rich. ex Bonpl.) Borhidi
- Solenandra pervestita (Borhidi & M.Fernández) Borhidi
- Solenandra polyphylla (Urb. & Ekman) Paudyal & Delprete
- Solenandra pulverulenta (Borhidi) Borhidi
- Solenandra rotundata (Griseb.) Paudyal & Delprete
- Solenandra sanctae-luciae (Kentish) Paudyal & Delprete
- Solenandra selleana (Urb. & Ekman) Borhidi
- Solenandra stenophylla (Britton) Paudyal & Delprete
- Solenandra triflora (W.Wright) Paudyal & Delprete
- Solenandra velutina (Standl.) Borhidi
