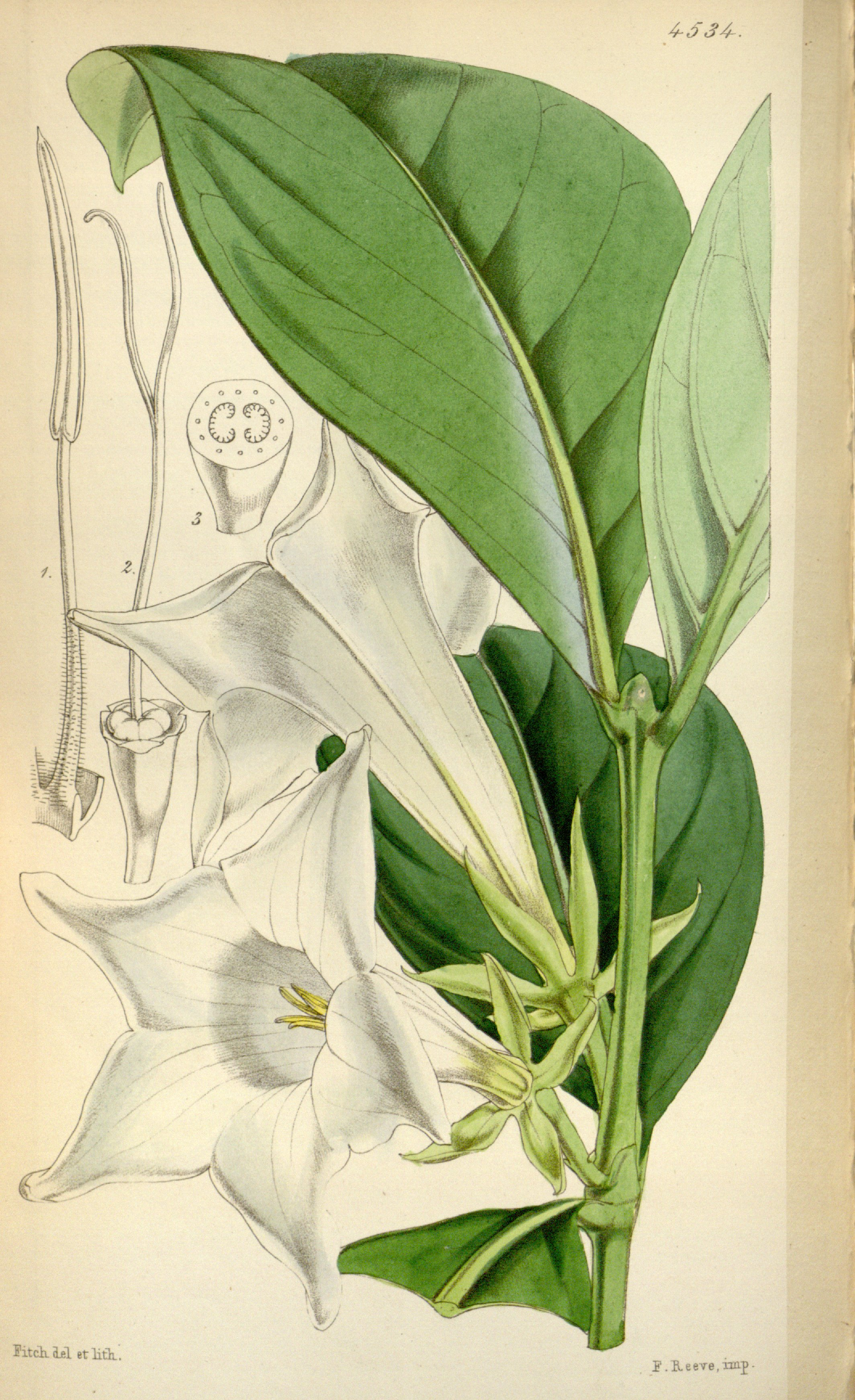

Conservation status
- Critically Endangered (IUCN 2.3)

Scientific classification
- Kingdom: Plantae
- Clade: Tracheophytes
- Clade: Angiosperms
- Clade: Eudicots
- Clade: Asterids
- Order: Gentianales
- Family: Rubiaceae
- Genus: Portlandia
- Species: P. platantha

Binomial name
- Portlandia platantha Hook.f.

Synonyms
- Portlandia albiflora Britton & Harris ex Standl.; Portlandia latifolia (DC.) Britton & Harris ex S.Moore; Solandra platantha (Hook.f.) Walp.

= Portlandia platantha =

Species of plant

Portlandia platantha, synonym Portlandia albiflora, is a species of plant in the family Rubiaceae. It is endemic to Jamaica.
