= Shafera =

Scientific classification
- Kingdom: Plantae
- Clade: Embryophytes
- Clade: Tracheophytes
- Clade: Angiosperms
- Clade: Eudicots
- Clade: Asterids
- Order: Asterales
- Family: Asteraceae
- Subfamily: Asteroideae
- Tribe: Senecioneae
- Genus: Shafera; Greenm.
- Species: S. platyphylla

Binomial name
- Shafera platyphylla Greenm.

Species of flowering plant

Shafera is a monotypic genus of plants in the groundsel tribe within the sunflower family.

The only known species is Shafera platyphylla, which is native to Cuba.

The genus name of Shafera is in honour of John Adolph Shafer (1863–1918), an American botanist. The Latin specific epithet of platyphylla is a compound word, with 'platy-' derived from Greek word (platús) meaning flat and broad, and also '-phylla' meaning leaf. Both the genus and the species were first described and published in Publ. Field Mus. Nat. Hist., Bot. (Series 2) page 327 in 1912.
