= Phialanthus revolutus =

Conservation status
- Endangered (IUCN 2.3)

Scientific classification
- Kingdom: Plantae
- Clade: Embryophytes
- Clade: Tracheophytes
- Clade: Angiosperms
- Clade: Eudicots
- Clade: Asterids
- Order: Gentianales
- Family: Rubiaceae
- Genus: Phialanthus
- Species: P. revolutus

Binomial name
- Phialanthus revolutus Urb.

Species of flowering plant

Phialanthus revolutus is a species of plant in the family Rubiaceae. It is endemic to Jamaica.

== Sources ==
- World Conservation Monitoring Centre (1998). "Phialanthus revolutus". IUCN Red List of Threatened Species. 1998 e.T33873A9809707. doi:10.2305/IUCN.UK.1998.RLTS.T33873A9809707.en.
