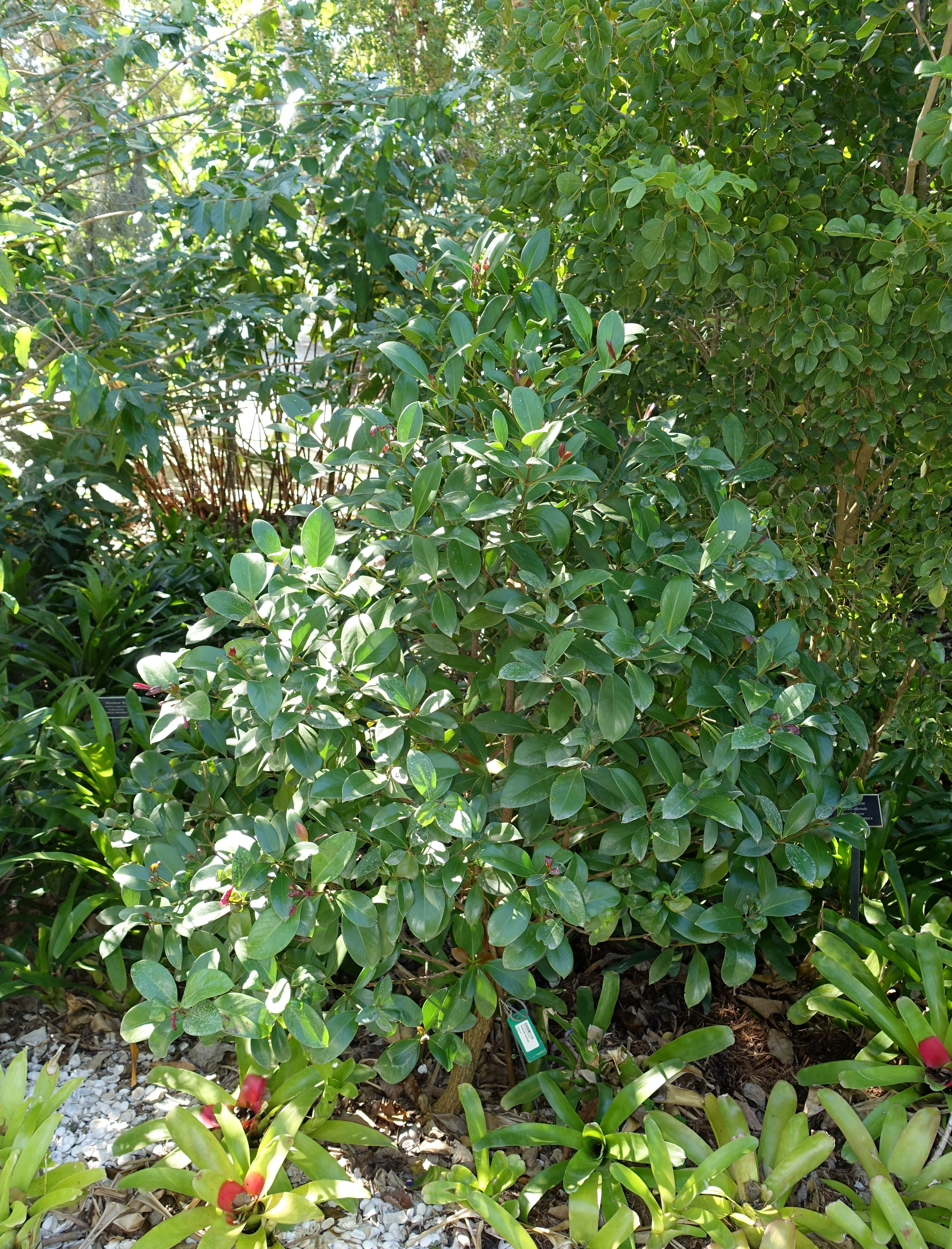
- Portlandia coccinea

Scientific classification
- Kingdom: Plantae
- Clade: Tracheophytes
- Clade: Angiosperms
- Clade: Eudicots
- Clade: Asterids
- Order: Gentianales
- Family: Rubiaceae
- Genus: Portlandia
- Species: P. coccinea

Binomial name
- Portlandia coccinea Sw.

= Portlandia coccinea =

Species of plant

Portlandia coccinea is a small tree or shrub with bright red flowers endemic to Jamaica. The species was first described in 1788. A population with darker flowers had been considered a subspecies of P. coccinea, but was described as a separate species, P. proctori, in 2003.

== Range and taxonomy ==
- Portlandia albiflora
- Portlandia grandiflora
- Portlandia harrisii
- Portlandia microsepala
- Portlandia proctorii
- Portlandia speciosa

Endemic to Jamaica's Caribbean ecology and biography Portlandia coccinea thrive most in warm climates and can survive in acidic soil and high altitude. These plants contain beautiful bell like ornamental flowers used in landscaping. The plants flower twice a year, once from March to October, June to August, and fruit between July and October.

== Description ==
Portlandia coccinea grow as evergreen shrubs or treelets 2.5–5 m in height, with pyramidal architecture. Their branches are very thin and brittle with a pale complexion. Leaves are oval, waxy, and dark green in color. They have stipules that are usually free or narrowly connected to the base. The plants flower twice a year, once from March to October, June to August, and fruit between July and October. The inflorescence is a reduced cyme (determinate), with 1–3 trumpet shaped flowers at each node. Stigmas and anthers of each flower project just beyond the corolla. Colors range from dark pink and deep crimson to white (hybrids) and are 6–8.5 cm in length. Flowers are followed by woody capsules containing the seeds.

== Ecology ==
Portlandia coccinea grows in the understory of limestone montane forests. In its native habitat, it is mainly pollinated by a Hummingbird called the Jamaica Mango. It is also pollinated by the red-billed Hummingbird.

== Uses ==
Portlandia coccinea grows very beautiful and exotic flowers. Therefore, its economic purpose is mostly ornamental. It is planted in gardens to display its large attractive flowers. Hybrids of this species and other species of the same genus have been created to display several different colors of flowers.

=== Cultivation ===
Portlandia coccinea is a slow growing shrub. It can be grown in areas of warm climate, including subtropical areas such as Miami. It prefers limestone soils. The plant will flower throughout the year if continuously irrigated.
