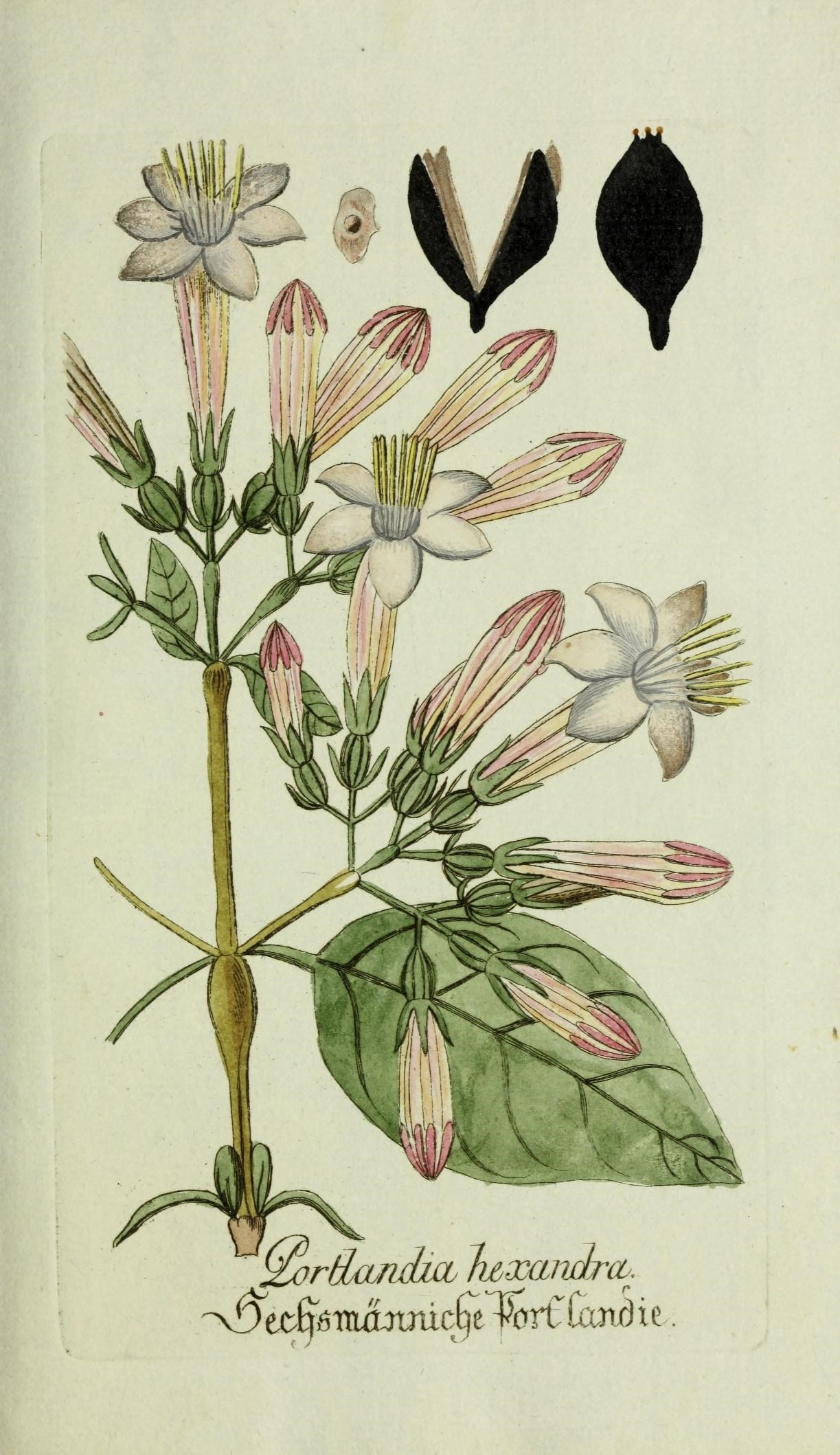
- Coutarea hexandra

Scientific classification
- Kingdom: Plantae
- Clade: Tracheophytes
- Clade: Angiosperms
- Clade: Eudicots
- Clade: Asterids
- Order: Gentianales
- Family: Rubiaceae
- Subfamily: Cinchonoideae
- Tribe: Chiococceae
- Genus: Coutarea; Aubl.

Type species
- Coutarea speciosa (syn. of Coutarea hexandra) Aubl.

Synonyms
- Cutaria Brign.

= Coutarea =

Genus of plants

Coutarea is a genus of flowering plants in the family Rubiaceae. The genus is native to southern Mexico, Central America, South America and the West Indies.

These plants are woody trees and shrubs with oppositely arranged leaves and terminal inflorescences. The large, showy flowers are white, pink, red, or purplish, sometimes with whitish or greenish markings. The fruit is a woody, flattened capsule, containing seeds with large wings.

== Species ==
- Coutarea andrei Standl. - Ecuador, Peru
- Coutarea coutaportloides C.M.Taylor - Ecuador
- Coutarea diervilloides Planch. & Linden - Colombia
- Coutarea fuchsioides C.M.Taylor - Peru
- Coutarea hexandra (Jacq.) K.Schum. - widespread in Latin America
- Coutarea mollis Cham. - Brazil
