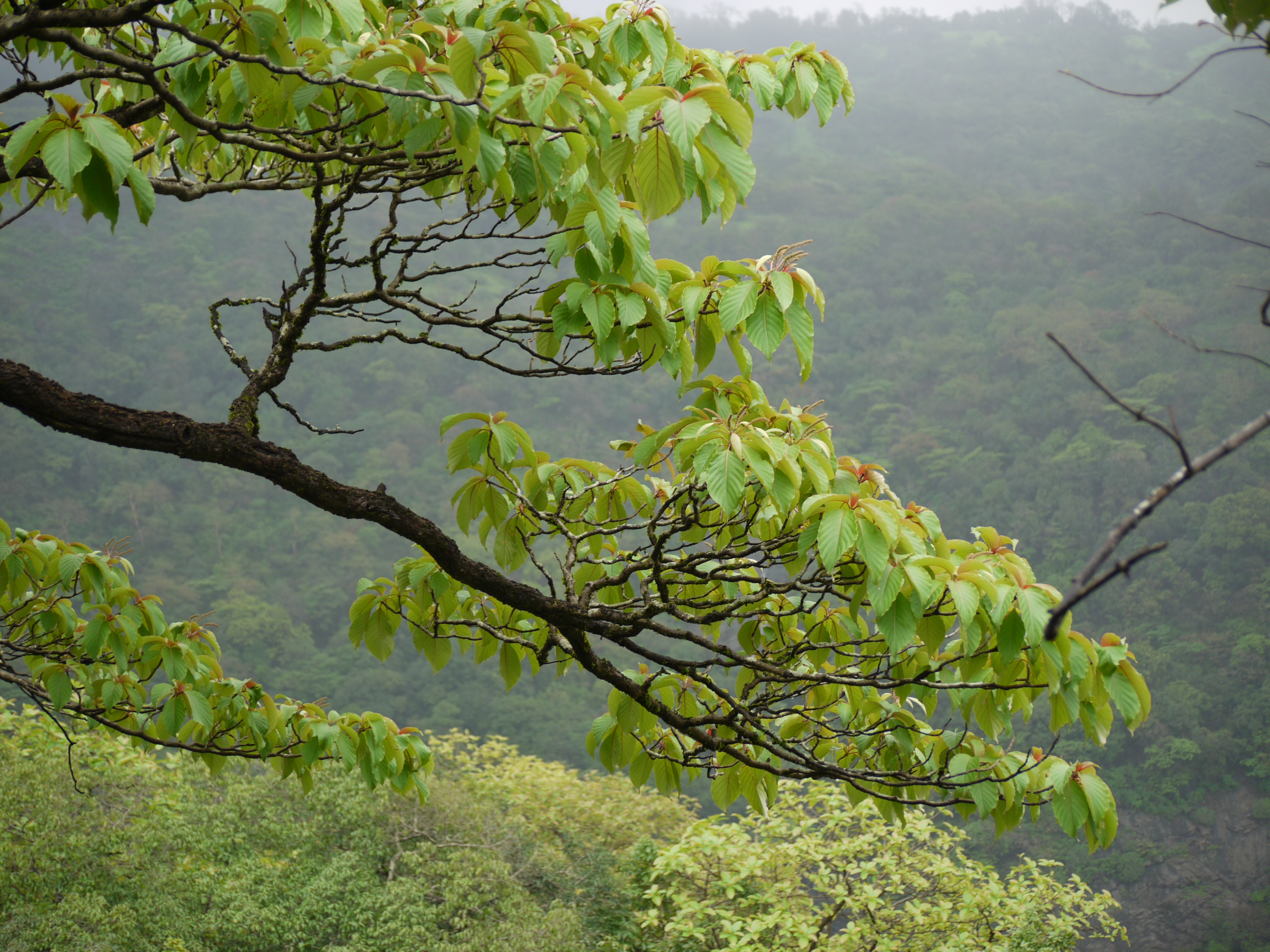
- Branches and leaves
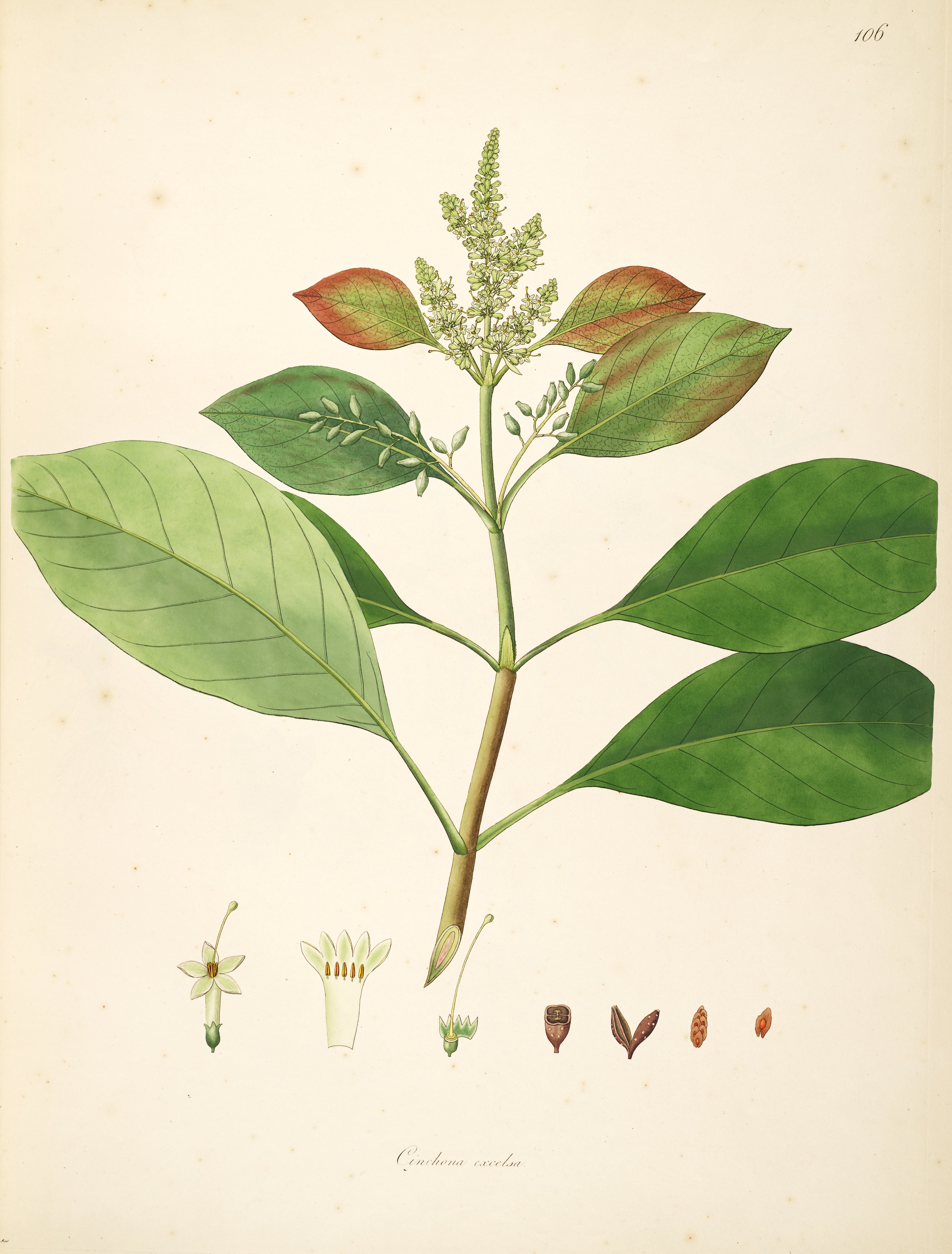
- Botanical illustration

Scientific classification
- Kingdom: Plantae
- Clade: Embryophytes
- Clade: Tracheophytes
- Clade: Spermatophytes
- Clade: Angiosperms
- Clade: Eudicots
- Clade: Asterids
- Order: Gentianales
- Family: Rubiaceae
- Genus: Hymenodictyon
- Species: H. orixense

Binomial name
- Hymenodictyon orixense (Roxb.) Mabb.

Synonyms
- List: Benteca rheedei Roem. & Schult.; Cinchona excelsa Roxb.; Cinchona orixensis Roxb.; Cinchona thyrsiflora Roxb.; Exostema philippicum Schult.; Hymenodictyon excelsum (Roxb.) Wall.; Hymenodictyon rheedei (Roem. & Schult.) M.R.Almeida & S.M.Almeida; Hymenodictyon thyrsiflorum Wall.; Hymenodictyon utile Wight

= Hymenodictyon orixense =

Species of flowering plant

Hymenodictyon orixense (syn. Hymenodictyon excelsum) is a species of flowering plant in the family Rubiaceae. It is found in the Indian Subcontinent, south-central China, Mainland Southeast Asia, and the Philippines.
