= Thiollierea kaalaensis =

Conservation status
- Endangered (IUCN 3.1)

Scientific classification
- Kingdom: Plantae
- Clade: Tracheophytes
- Clade: Angiosperms
- Clade: Eudicots
- Clade: Asterids
- Order: Gentianales
- Family: Rubiaceae
- Genus: Thiollierea
- Species: T. kaalaensis

Binomial name
- Thiollierea kaalaensis (N.Hallé & Jérémie) Barrabé & Mouly

Synonyms
- Bikkia kaalensis N.Hallé & Jérémie

Species of plant

Thiollierea kaalaensis is a species of flowering plant in the family Rubiaceae. It is endemic to New Caledonia.
