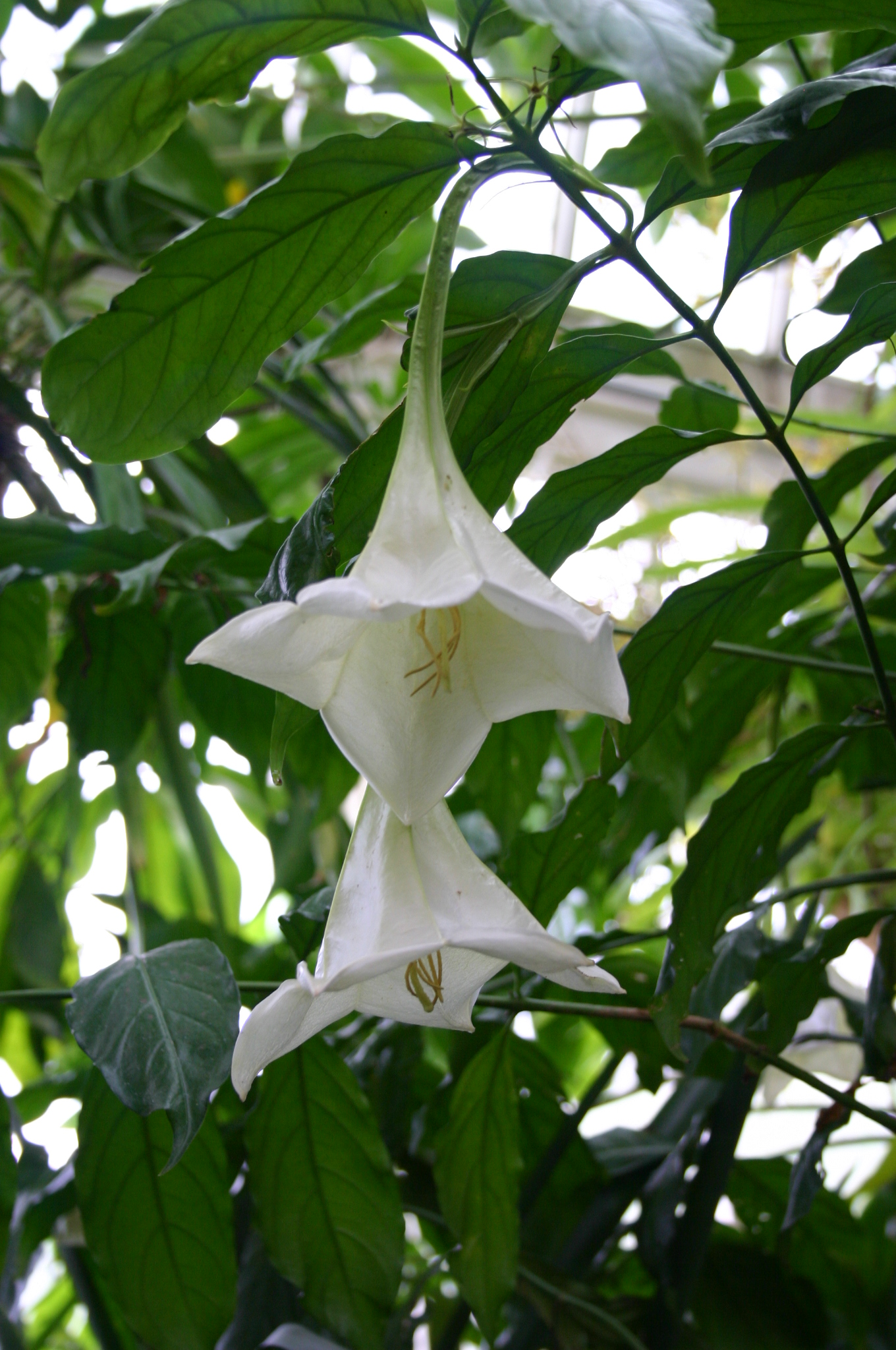
- Osa pulchra cultivated at the New York Botanical Garden

Conservation status
- Endangered (IUCN 3.1)

Scientific classification
- Kingdom: Plantae
- Clade: Tracheophytes
- Clade: Angiosperms
- Clade: Eudicots
- Clade: Asterids
- Order: Gentianales
- Family: Rubiaceae
- Subfamily: Cinchonoideae
- Tribe: Chiococceae
- Genus: Osa; Aiello
- Species: O. pulchra

Binomial name
- Osa pulchra (D.R.Simpson) Aiello
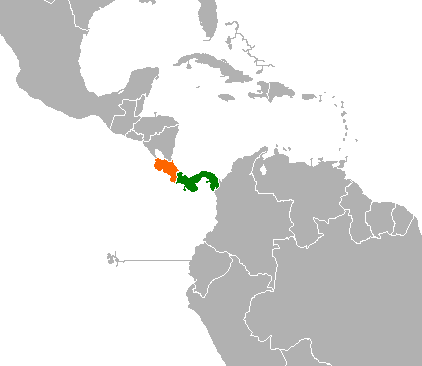
- It is native to Costa Rica and Panama

Synonyms
- Hintonia pulchra D.R.Simpson

= Osa pulchra =

Species of plant

Osa pulchra is a species of rare flowering plant in the monotypic genus Osa, belonging to the family Rubiaceae. There are only two known populations in Costa Rica, with less than a total of thirty individual plants and a small population in Panama. The genus name is derived from that of the Osa Peninsula in southwestern Costa Rica. The plant is a shrub or small tree and has been cultivated in several botanical gardens, including Kew Gardens, the New York Botanical Garden, and the Huntington Botanical Garden.

== Description ==
Osa pulchra has large white, trumpet-shaped, pendulous flowers reminiscent of those of certain Solanaceous genera - particularly those of Brugmansia and Solandra. The flowers are pendent, borne on long pedicels and feature fused petals borne upon slender, elongate corolla tubes. The blooms are highly fragrant at night and are most likely pollinated by bats (chiropterophily).

== Conservation ==
It is considered to be an endangered species by the IUCN Red List of threatened species.

== Cultivation ==
This species is highly coveted because of its ornamental value. It needs a warm and humid climate with a well drained substrate and bright, indirect light. The plant is most easily propagated by seed, since cuttings can only be taken from the top of the plant due to apical dominance. Seeds will germinate after one month, after which it takes three more weeks for them to emerge fully from the substrate and shed their seed coats.
