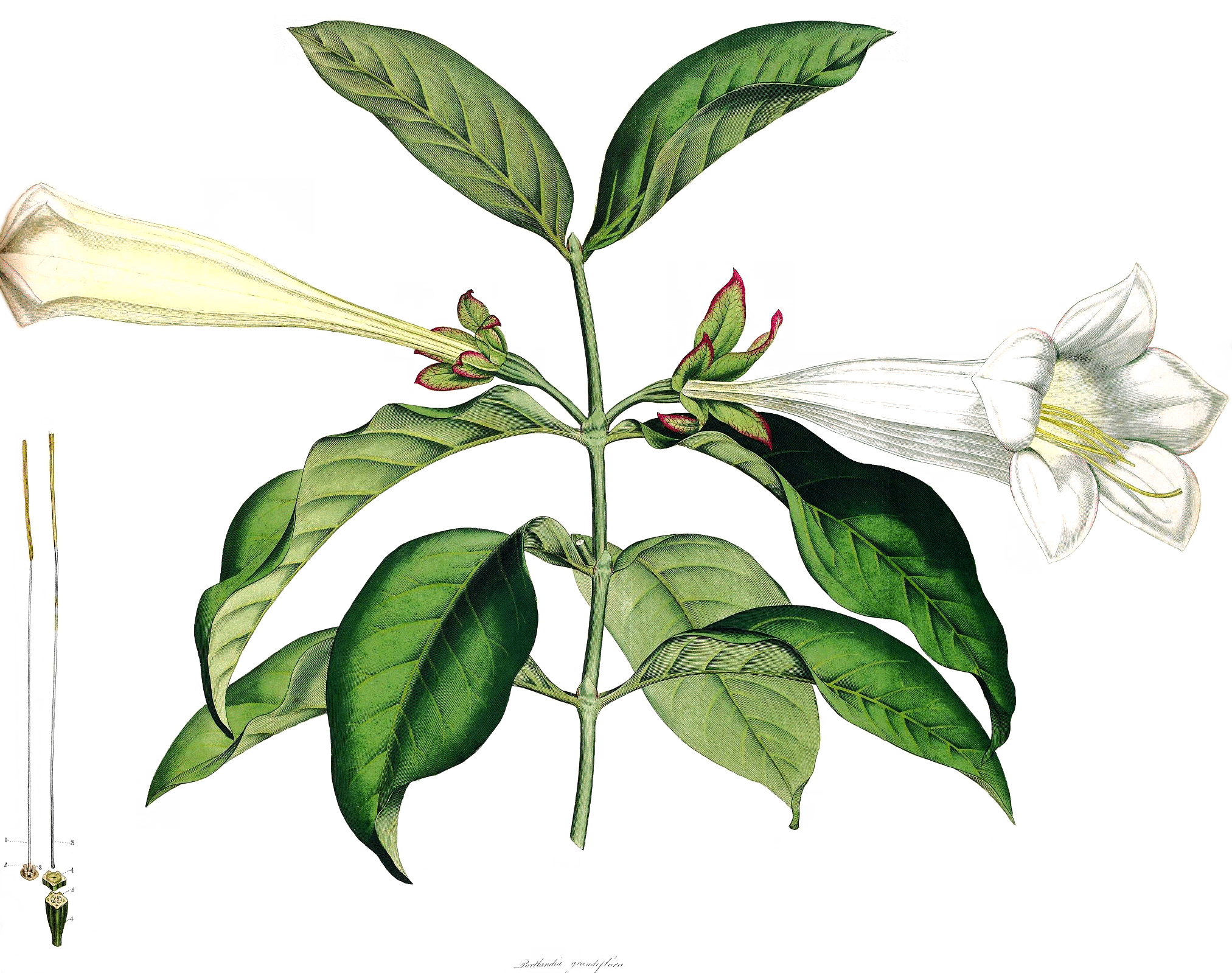
- J.E. Smith, M.D. Fasc. 1-3.

Conservation status
- Near Threatened (IUCN 2.3)

Scientific classification
- Kingdom: Plantae
- Clade: Embryophytes
- Clade: Tracheophytes
- Clade: Spermatophytes
- Clade: Angiosperms
- Clade: Eudicots
- Clade: Asterids
- Order: Gentianales
- Family: Rubiaceae
- Genus: Portlandia
- Species: P. grandiflora

Binomial name
- Portlandia grandiflora L.

= Portlandia grandiflora =

Jamaican Bellflower

Species of plant

Portlandia grandiflora, the jamaican bellflower, is a species of plant in the family Rubiaceae. Commonly known as the bell flower, this plant is considered native to Jamaica but is also native to Cuba (VanZile 2014). It is mainly found in limestone montane forests although some occur on karst areas near Jamaica's coast. It mostly grows on alkaline soils as can be observed by the habitats they are found in. In Jamaica, they flower most frequently in May, June, and August, and fruit during the months of January and December.

== Key Features ==
The habit of this plant can be a small tree or a shrub up to 15 feet tall, and the flowers are hermaphroditic. These white trumpet shaped flowers can grow to about 6 inches long, and are followed by woody oval-shaped fruit 2–3 cm long with a dry appearance (Tucker 2010). The large leaves are dark green with a pinnate venation, and have an opposite arrangement on the plant stem.

== Ecology ==
The flower gives off a strong vanilla scent at night that attracts moths. These moths are known to be the pollinators of this Portlandia species (Burghart 2014). Seed dispersal is less obvious: they are evidently not wind dispersed and the woody, non-spiny fruits do not readily suggest animal dispersal either; however we do know that people now disperse and cultivate the seeds.

== Human Cultivation and uses ==
Although medicinal uses are not known, this plant Portlandia grandiflora is widely planted in gardens as an ornamental because of its beauty and scent.

== Sources ==
- "Karst (geology)." Encyclopædia Britannica Online. Encyclopædia Britannica. Web. 5 Dec. 2014. <http://www.britannica.com/EBchecked/topic/312718/karst>.
- Clifford, Patti. Hear.org. 28 Aug. 2012. Web. 13 Dec. 2014. <http://www.hear.org/pier/wra/pacific/Portlandia grandiflora.pdf>.
- Burghardt, James "Portlandia Grandiflora, Bell Flower, Glorious Flower of Cuba, White Horse Flower, Tree Lily -." Rare Plants for Home and Garden. N.p. Web. 5 Dec. 2014. <http://toptropicals.com/catalog/uid/portlandia_grandiflora.htm>.
- Francisco-Ortega, Dr. Javier, Dr. Carl Lewis, and Michael Davenport. "Jewels of the Caribbean." Fairchild Botanical Garden Virtual Herbarium. 1 Jan. 2006. Web. 11 Dec. 2014. <http://www.virtualherbarium.org/research/JewelsCaribbean.html>.
- "PORTLANDIA Grandiflora." Learn2Grow. Web. 5 Dec. 2014. <http://www.learn2grow.com/plants/portlandia-grandiflora/ >.
- Summary of Jamaica's Third National Report to the Convention on Biological Diversity: 2003–2004. Kingston, Jamaica: NEPA, 2010. Print.
- Tucker, A.O., A.J. Redford, J. Scher, and M.D. Trice. 2010. Dried Botanical ID. Delaware State University, Identification Technology Program, CPHST, PPQ, APHIS, USDA; Fort Collins, CO. 11 Dec. 2014. <https://idtools.org/id/dried_botanical>
- VanZile, Jon. "Looking for a Beautiful Large Container Plant with Interesting Flowers? Try the Portlandia Grandiflora." About. N.p. Web. 5 Dec. 2014. <http://houseplants.about.com/od/August-2014/fl/Growing-Portlandia-grandiflora-plants.htm >.
