= Erithalis orbiculata =

Conservation status
- Critically Endangered (IUCN 3.1)

Scientific classification
- Kingdom: Plantae
- Clade: Tracheophytes
- Clade: Angiosperms
- Clade: Eudicots
- Clade: Asterids
- Order: Gentianales
- Family: Rubiaceae
- Genus: Erithalis
- Species: E. orbiculata

Binomial name
- Erithalis orbiculata (Proctor) A.R.Franck & P.A.Lewis

Synonyms
- Exostema orbiculatum Proctor

Species of plant

Erithalis orbiculata, synonym Exostema orbiculatum, is a species of plant in the family Rubiaceae. It is a shrub or small tree which grows up to 3 metres tall that is endemic to Jamaica. It grows on forested limestone hills in the central highlands of Jamaica from 600 to 800 metres elevation. It is known from only three locations, and the IUCN Red List assesses the species as Critically Endangered.

The species was first described as Exostema orbiculatum by George Richardson Proctor in 1982. In 2017 Alan R. Franck, Patrick A. Lewis, and Andreas Oberli placed the species in genus Erithalis as Erithalis orbiculata.
