= John Adolph Shafer =

John Adolph Shafer(1863–1918)

John Adolph Shafer (February 23, 1863 – February 1, 1918) was an American botanist.

== Life ==
Born in Pittsburgh, Pennsylvania, Shafer graduated from the Pittsburgh School, of Pharmacy in 1881 and worked as a pharmacist until after his marriage to Martha Tischer in 1888. In 1897 Shafer was appointed Custodian in the Section of Botany at the Carnegie Museum of Natural History and in 1904 he became Museum Custodian at the New York Botanical Garden. He received the honorary degree of Doctor of Pharmacy in 1895.

Shafer's most important collecting trips were to Cuba between 1903 and 1912, but he also visited and collected on Montserrat, Puerto Rico, Vieques, the Virgin Islands (St. Thomas, St. John, Tortola, Virgin Gorda), Anegada, and finally, in 1916-17 in Argentina and Paraguay.

He is commemorated in the names of the genera Shafera (the sunflower family, 1912,) and Shaferocharis (the family Rubiaceae, 1912,). As well as in a number of species he discovered, although he published very little himself.

== Bibliography ==
- WorldCat
