= Thiollierea pachyphylla =

Conservation status
- Endangered (IUCN 3.1)

Scientific classification
- Kingdom: Plantae
- Clade: Tracheophytes
- Clade: Angiosperms
- Clade: Eudicots
- Clade: Asterids
- Order: Gentianales
- Family: Rubiaceae
- Genus: Thiollierea
- Species: T. pachyphylla

Binomial name
- Thiollierea pachyphylla (Guillaumin) Barrabé & Mouly

Synonyms
- Bikkia pachyphylla Guillaumin

Species of plant

Thiollierea pachyphylla is a species of flowering plant in the family Rubiaceae. It is endemic to New Caledonia.
