= Erithalis harrisii =

Conservation status
- Near Threatened (IUCN 2.3)

Scientific classification
- Kingdom: Plantae
- Clade: Tracheophytes
- Clade: Angiosperms
- Clade: Eudicots
- Clade: Asterids
- Order: Gentianales
- Family: Rubiaceae
- Genus: Erithalis
- Species: E. harrisii

Binomial name
- Erithalis harrisii Urb.

Species of plant

Erithalis harrisii is a species of plant in the family Rubiaceae. It is endemic to Jamaica.
