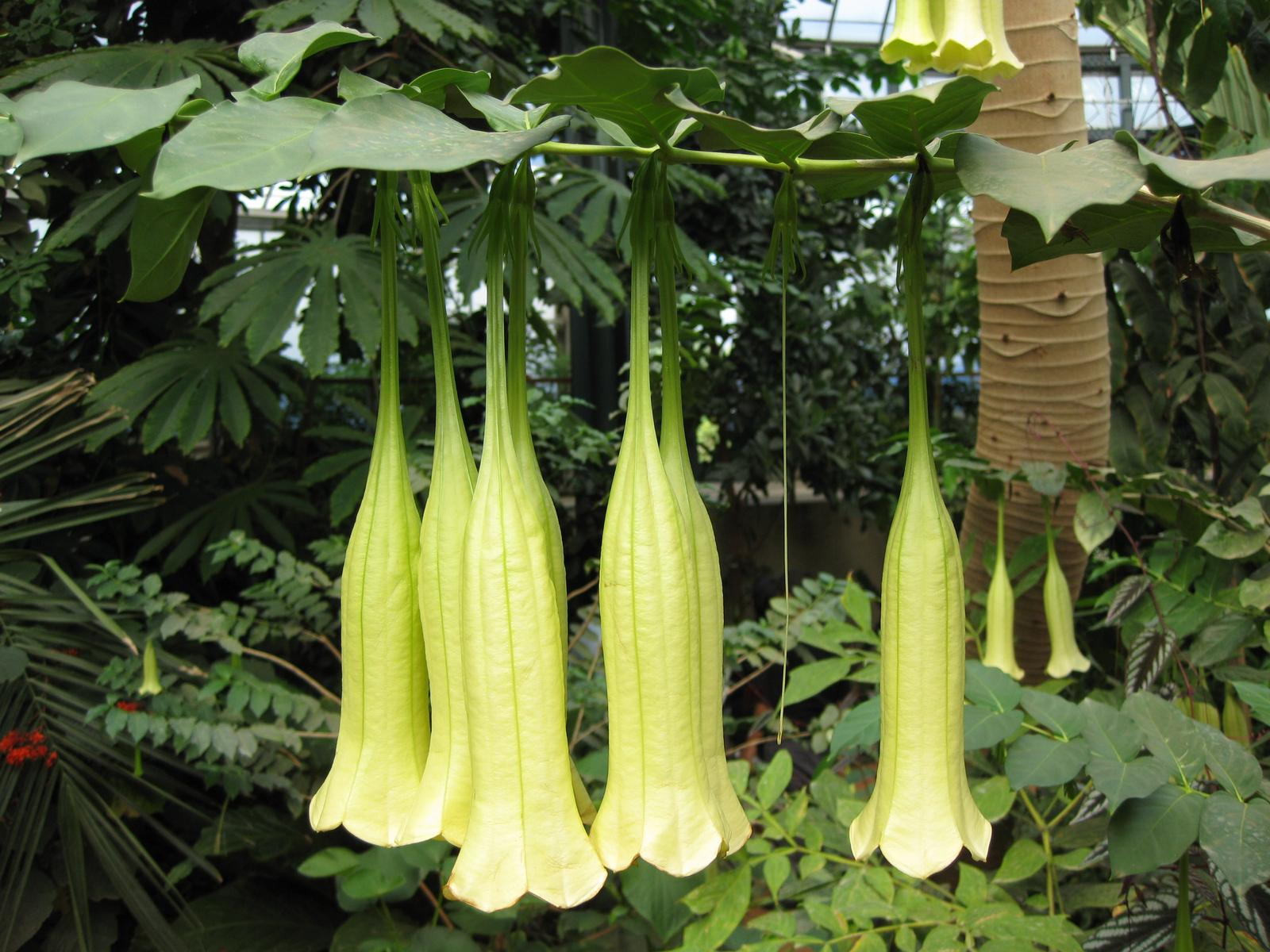

Scientific classification
- Kingdom: Plantae
- Clade: Embryophytes
- Clade: Tracheophytes
- Clade: Spermatophytes
- Clade: Angiosperms
- Clade: Eudicots
- Clade: Asterids
- Order: Gentianales
- Family: Rubiaceae
- Genus: Cubanola
- Species: C. domingensis

Binomial name
- Cubanola domingensis (Britton) Aiello
- It is endemic to the Dominican Republic

Synonyms
- Portlandia domingensis Britton

= Cubanola domingensis =

Species of flowering plant

Cubanola domingensis, or campanita, is a species of small tree in the family Rubiaceae endemic to the Dominican Republic. The plant is known for its downward-facing, trumpet-like blossoms.

== Description ==
Cubanola domingensis are shrubs or small trees up to 2 m in height with pendant, white flowers. Leaves with petioles 1–3 mm long, blades ovate or elliptic 6–12 cm long, 3.3–6 cm wide, acuminate or acute at apex, obtuse or acute at base. Calyx lobes 1.1-2.5 cm long, 1–2 mm wide. Corolla 18.5-19.8 long, tube 6.5–7 cm long, lobes 7–8 mm long. Fruit ellipsoid, 3-4.3 cm long, apex obtuse.

== Taxonomy ==
It was first collected by Joseph Nelson Rose in 1913 near Santo Domingo and was published as Portlandia domingensis Britton by Nathaniel Lord Britton in 1914. Later, Annette Aiello moved it to a new genus, Cubanola Aiello, in her 1979 doctoral thesis A reexamination of Portlandia (Rubiaceae) and associated taxa.

=== Etymology ===
The specific epithet domingensis, meaning of domingo, refers to the capital of the Dominican Republic, Santo Domingo.

== Distribution and habitat ==
They are endemic to the Dominican Republic, where they are found in the provinces of Puerto Plata, Santo Domingo, San Pedro de Macorís, and La Altagracia.

== Ecology ==
This plant usually grows in partial or full shade. This plant grows in limestone areas and thus does well in alkaline soils. Being fully tropical, it is cold sensitive. In subtropical areas such as South Florida, cold weather may cause the leaves and flowers to drop.

== Uses ==
Cubanola domingensis is cultivated as an ornamental.
