= Solenandra triflora =

Conservation status
- Vulnerable (IUCN 2.3)

Scientific classification
- Kingdom: Plantae
- Clade: Tracheophytes
- Clade: Angiosperms
- Clade: Eudicots
- Clade: Asterids
- Order: Gentianales
- Family: Rubiaceae
- Genus: Solenandra
- Species: S. triflora

Binomial name
- Solenandra triflora (W.Wright) Paudyal & Delprete

Synonyms
- Cinchona triflora W.Wright; Exostema triflorum (W.Wright) G.Don

Species of plant

Solenandra triflora, synonym Exostema triflorum, is a species of plant in the family Rubiaceae. It is endemic to Jamaica. It is threatened by habitat loss.
