= Erithalis quadrangularis =

Conservation status
- Vulnerable (IUCN 2.3)

Scientific classification
- Kingdom: Plantae
- Clade: Tracheophytes
- Clade: Angiosperms
- Clade: Eudicots
- Clade: Asterids
- Order: Gentianales
- Family: Rubiaceae
- Genus: Erithalis
- Species: E. quadrangularis

Binomial name
- Erithalis quadrangularis Krug & Urb.

Species of plant

Erithalis quadrangularis is a species of plant in the family Rubiaceae. It is endemic to Jamaica.
