= Phialanthus jamaicensis =

Conservation status
- Endangered (IUCN 2.3)

Scientific classification
- Kingdom: Plantae
- Clade: Tracheophytes
- Clade: Angiosperms
- Clade: Eudicots
- Clade: Asterids
- Order: Gentianales
- Family: Rubiaceae
- Genus: Phialanthus
- Species: P. jamaicensis

Binomial name
- Phialanthus jamaicensis Urb.

Species of plant

Phialanthus jamaicensis is a species of plant in the family Rubiaceae. It is endemic to Jamaica. It is threatened by habitat loss.

== Sources ==
- World Conservation Monitoring Centre (1998). "Phialanthus jamaicensis". IUCN Red List of Threatened Species. 1998 e.T33874A9809823. doi:10.2305/IUCN.UK.1998.RLTS.T33874A9809823.en.
