= Solenandra brachycarpa =

Conservation status
- Near Threatened (IUCN 2.3)

Scientific classification
- Kingdom: Plantae
- Clade: Tracheophytes
- Clade: Angiosperms
- Clade: Eudicots
- Clade: Asterids
- Order: Gentianales
- Family: Rubiaceae
- Genus: Solenandra
- Species: S. brachycarpa

Binomial name
- Solenandra brachycarpa (Sw.) Paudyal & Delprete

Synonyms
- Cinchona brachycarpa Sw.; Exostema brachycarpum (Sw.) Schult.

Species of plant

Solenandra brachycarpa, synonym Exostema brachycarpum, is a species of plant in the family Rubiaceae. It is endemic to Jamaica.
