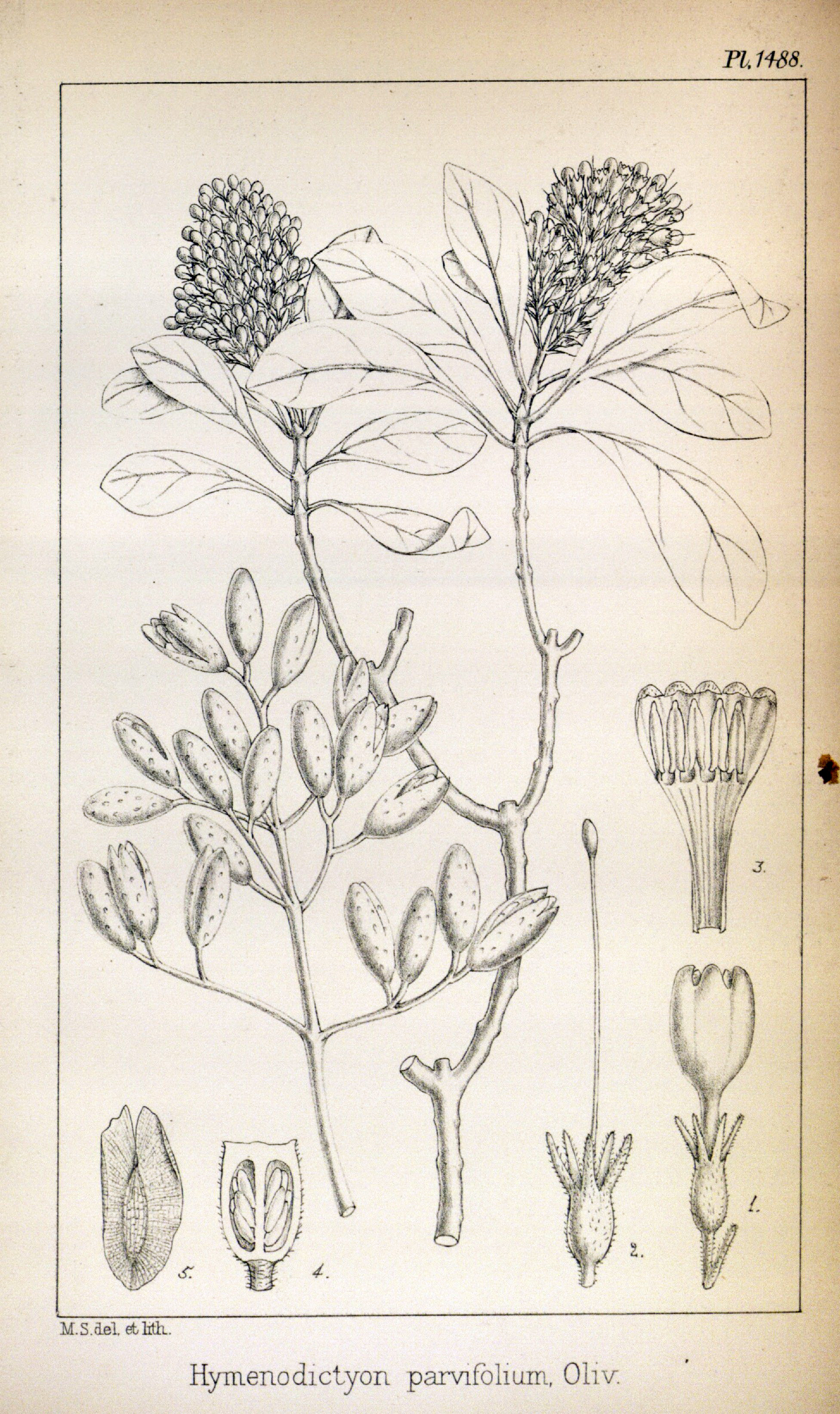
- Plate by Matilda Smith

Scientific classification
- Kingdom: Plantae
- Clade: Tracheophytes
- Clade: Angiosperms
- Clade: Eudicots
- Clade: Asterids
- Order: Gentianales
- Family: Rubiaceae
- Genus: Hymenodictyon
- Species: H. parvifolium

Binomial name
- Hymenodictyon parvifolium Oliv.

Synonyms
- Hymenodictyon parvifolium var. fimbriolatum (K.Schum. ex De Wild.) Verdc.; Hymenodictyon parvifolium subsp. parvifolium

= Hymenodictyon parvifolium =

Species of flowering plant

Hymenodictyon parvifolium Oliv. is a small rubiaceous African tree and is one of some 24 species in the genus, with a tropical African and Asian distribution. This species grows as a small tree to some 5 metres tall, or sometimes a liane or scrambler to 10.5 m, and is found in low-altitude woodland (250 – 1110 m).

== Range ==
It occurs in Sudan, Uganda, Democratic Republic of the Congo, Kenya, Tanzania, Malawi, Mozambique, Zambia, Zimbabwe and the provinces of Limpopo and Mpumalanga in South Africa.

== Description ==
Leaves are 3.5 x 1.5 cm, obovate to oblanceolate with acute apex and decurrent base, and minutely puberulous on veins of the lower surface. Flowers are terminal in thyrsoid panicles, at ends of short lateral shoots, and are very fragrant. Calyx small and much shorter than corolla, glabrous to scabrid-pubescent; lobes up to 2.5 mm long, lanceolate. Corolla white, greenish-white or yellow, with touches of red in bud; glabrous or puberulous; tube cylindrical below, bell-shaped or campanulate above; lobes 5–6, ovate, ciliolate; style long, strongly protruding from the corolla. The tree produces ellipsoid, reddish-grey-brown capsules of about 2.5 × 1 cm, covered in prominent lenticels, splitting from the apex into 2 valves, which in turn may split for a short distance. Its seeds are straw-coloured, 1.6 × 1.0 cm, and somewhat elliptic, compressed and winged, the wing notched at the hilar end, and the seed coat strongly reticulate and slightly shiny.

The genus Hymenodictyon dates back to 1824 and was created by Nathaniel Wallich, the Danish botanist and Superintendent of the Calcutta Botanical Garden, and its description was included in William Roxburgh's Flora Indica.

== Pharmacological properties ==
A methanol extract of the bark showed broad antifungal and antibacterial activity. The species is used as a malarial febrifuge. An infusion of the stem bark is used in the treatment of skin diseases, venereal diseases and dysentery. A decoction of plant parts is drunk by children experiencing breathing difficulty. Its roots are used for snake bites and as a purgative.

== Etymology ==
'Hymeno'= membrane, and refers to the thin wing around each seed - 'dictyon'= reticulate pattern or network - 'parvifolium'= small leaf.

== Gallery ==
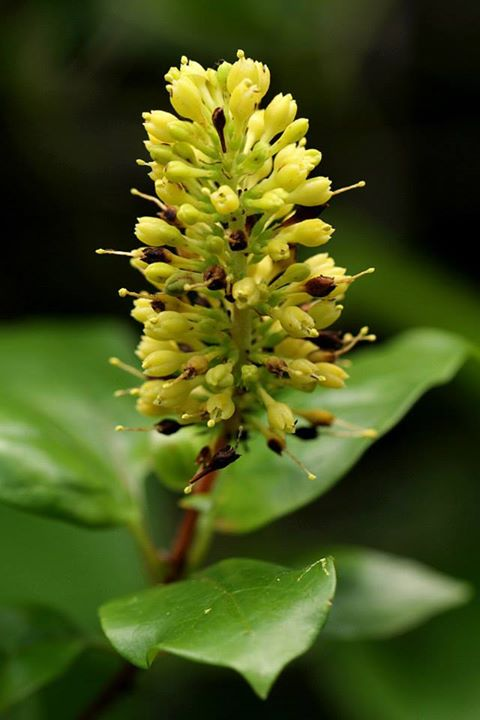
Hymenodictyon parvifolium flowers

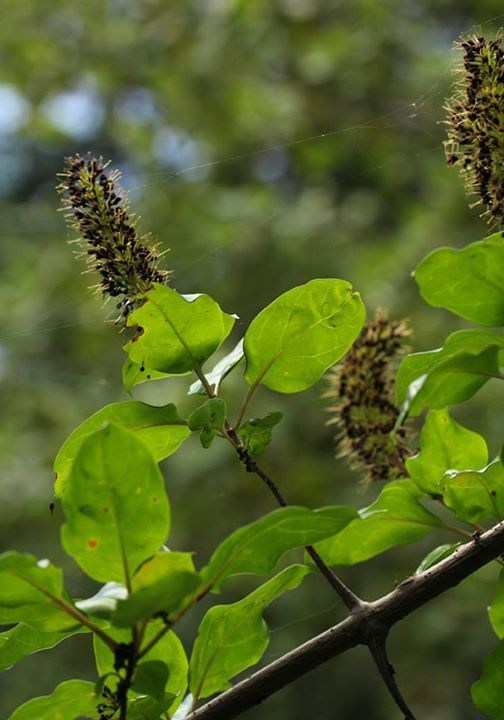
