= Portlandia harrisii =

Conservation status
- Vulnerable (IUCN 2.3)

Scientific classification
- Kingdom: Plantae
- Clade: Tracheophytes
- Clade: Angiosperms
- Clade: Eudicots
- Clade: Asterids
- Order: Gentianales
- Family: Rubiaceae
- Genus: Portlandia
- Species: P. harrisii

Binomial name
- Portlandia harrisii Britton

Species of plant

Portlandia harrisii is a species of plant in the family Rubiaceae. It is endemic to Jamaica.
