= Stanley Heckadon Moreno =

Anthropologist, conservationist, writer

Stanley Philip Heckadon-Moreno
- Born: October 9, 1943 (age 82); Puerto Armuelles, Panama, North America
- Education: BA in Anthropology, University of Los Andes, Colombia MA in Sociology, University of Essex, UK PhD in Sociology, University of Essex, UK
- Occupations: Anthropologist, conservationist, writer, educator
- Years active: 1979-present
- Spouse: Sonia Martinelli Tono (1976–present)
- Children: Monica Isabel Heckadon Martinelli & Diego Antonio Heckadon Martinelli

Stanley Heckadon-Moreno (9 October 1943) is a Panamanian anthropologist, conservationist, writer and educator. He is an advocate for the preservation of tropical forests in Central America. His work has contributed to the creation of protected areas in Panama, particularly in the Panama Canal Watershed. He has also contributed to creation of the legislation to protect indigenous territories.

Since 1983 he has been associated with the Smithsonian Tropical Research Institute (STRI). From 2000 to 2020 he was their director of the Galeta Point Marine Laboratory.

== Early life ==
Stanley Heckadon-Moreno was born on 9 October 1943 in Puerto Armuelles, Panama, as an only child to American Mennonite farmer Philip Stanley Heckadon and Panamanian Manuela ´Nenga´ Moreno Caballero. His father emigrated to Panama during the Great Depression (before Heckadon-Moreno was born) to work on the banana plantations of the Chiqiruí Land Company. His mother was a rural school teacher at the first public school in Puerto Armuelles, the Tómas Armuelles School. She was an early women's rights activist.

Heckadon Moreno grew up on the remote farm of his maternal grandparents Aurelio Moreno and Josefa Caballero de Moreno, who had migrated to these forests in the wake of the Thousand Days' War. From an early age Heckadon Moreno learned farm work and fishing in the rivers and the sea. In his childhood he contracted malaria three times. Upon his parents' divorce his mother decided to move to Panama City, Panama, where her son could receive better healthcare and a good education.

== Education ==
=== Childhood ===
Stanley Heckadon-Moreno attended the Colegio Javier in San Felipe (now Casco Viejo), Panama City from 1950 to 1958. He graduated from the San Vicente de Paúl School in David, Panama in 1960.

=== Undergraduate education ===
On recommendation of his former professor, Ralph Beals, Heckadon-Moreno applied to the Department of Anthropology at the University of Los Andes, Bogotá in Columbia. Dr. Gerardo Reichel-Dolmatoff accepted him into the program. He was allowed to validate his subjects, and with a loan from the Institute for the Training and Use of Human Resources (IFARHU) graduated with a BA in 1970. His field work and thesis were centered on the economic system of a fishing community in the San Bernardo Islands in Colombia's Caribbean Coast.

=== Postgraduate education ===
Heckadon-Moreno was the first Panamanian to receive a scholarship in Social Sciences from the British Overseas Council, which allowed him to obtain his MA in Sociology in 1973 at the University of Essex, UK. He returned to the University of Essex in 1977 with a scholarship from the Ford Foundation, obtaining his PhD in Sociology. His thesis "Panama's expanding cattle front: The Santeno Campesinos and the Colonization of the Forests" in 1983 centered on the impact of extensive cattle ranging and slash-and-burn agriculture on tropical forests.

== Career ==
Throughout his life, Stanley Heckadon-Moreno studied the environmental impact of the production systems of peasant and indigenous communities in Panama and Central America. He became an expert on environmental policies which helped in the creation and conservation of protected areas and indigenous territories across Central America.

=== Ministry of Planning and Political Economy (Ministerio de Planificación y Politica Económica - MPPE) ===
From 1972 to 1980, at MPPE, Heckadon-Moreno worked as a senior social scientist responsible for studies of policies towards indigenous people, the demarcation of their territories and the introduction in the National Constitution of 1972 of the rights of the indigenous people of Panama. He was also involved in the study of rural poverty among peasants in Panama and evaluation of rural cooperatives and the agrarian reform process.

==== National parks ====
During these years, he aided in the establishment of many national parks across Panama, particularly in the Panama Canal Watershed:

- Soberania National Park, Panama
- Chagres National Park, Panama
- Metropolitan Natural Park, Panama
- Camino de Cruces National Park, Panama
- Darién National Park, Panama
- La Amistad International Park, Panama and Costa Rica

==== Chagres River basin ====
The El Niño in 1982 to 1983 caused severe droughts in Panama. Heckadon-Moreno led the Task Force on the Panama Watershed in order to evaluate the Panama Canal Watershed. A group of 175 experts from various state and academic institutions, as well as business leaders and environmental organizations were tasked with determining the relationship between national development and the Chagres River basin. The government wanted to replace the native jungles with pastures. Heckadon-Moreno theorized that this action would undermine and destroy the natural diversity and endanger the quality of the land through soil degradation, sedimentation of rivers and monopolization of land. According to Heckadon-Moreno, this would result in more poverty and a great loss of potential revenue through tourism.

The formal recommendation of the workgroup was to protect over 200,000 acres of jungle surrounding the Chagres, Pequeni and Boquerón rivers.

=== Tropical Argonomic Center for Research and Teaching (Centro Agronómico Tropical de Investigación y Enseñanza - CATIE), Costa Rica ===
In 1986, Heckadon-Moreno became a senior social scientist at CATIE in Costa Rica. His research was focused on the evaluation of social forestry projects among hillside farmers in Central America and the Caribbean. It included the evaluation of the success and failure of rapid growth tree species among hillside farmers in Central America to provide wood for construction, firewood and charcoal.

Heckadon-Moreno led the task force set by the International Union for Conservation of Nature (IUCN) in Central America. This project was focused on determining the most updated condition of the environment of Central America at that time. His findings were presented in the 1988 XVII General Assembly of the IUCN in Costa Rica, an event attended by more than thousand international delegates. The idea of the Paseo Pantera (Mesoamerican Biological Corridor) was created here, in order to safeguards the rainforests in the Caribbean from Belize to Panama.

=== Panama's National Institute of Renewable Resources (Instituto Nacional de Recursos Naturales Renovables - INRENARE) ===
From 1990 to 1990 Heckadon-Moreno was the director general of INRENARE and was responsible for Panama's national protected areas, national forests, soil conservation, hydrological resources and environmental education.

=== International consultancy projects ===
Between 1991 and 1994 Heckadon-Moreno worked for and with many institutions, amongst which the Food and Agriculture Organization (FAO), International Fund for Agricultural Development (IFAD), the U.S. Agency for International Development (USAID), Summit of Americas and Social Emergency Fund of Panama (Fondo de Emergencía Social - FES) on projects on environmental profiles, research projects, scholarships and demarcation of protected areas. He has helped to establish several international centers amongst others the Center for Tropical Forestry Research (CIFOR) in Bogor, Indonesia and the Center for Water Research in Humid Tropics of Latin America (Centro de Agua del Trópico Húmedo de América Latina y el Caribe - CATHALAC) in Panama.

=== Smithsonian Tropical Research Institute (STRI), Panama ===
In 1983 Heckadon-Moreno became a research associate with the STRI. Since 1995, he began to research and write for the general public on the history of natural history in Panama and Central America. He has written about notable individuals, mainly naturalists, who lived and worked in Central America in the 18th and 19th century.

==== Station Director of Galeta Point Marine Laboratory, Colón ====
From 2000 to 2020, Heckadon-Moreno led the Galeta Point Marine Laboratory on Galeta Island in Colón, Panama as staff scientist and station director. Galeta Point was formerly a military communications station during the Cold War for the USA Navy. It became the STRI Caribbean marine lab in 1964. Galeta Point serves as a research center for marine and coastal ecosystems, as well as a dynamic educational center with a focus on teaching and preserving the local marine environment.

== Personal life ==
Stanley Heckadon-Moreno married Sonia Martinelli Tono in 1976. Together they have two children.

== Bibliography ==
=== Publications ===
Stanley Heckadon-Moreno has published extensively. Most writings are originally in Spanish or English and some have been digitized and are free to access.

- Heckadon-Moreno, Stanley. (1973). Los Asentamientos Campesinos: Una Experienca Panameña en Reforma Agraria. Ministerio de Planificatión y Política Económica.
- Heckadon-Moreno, Stanley, & McKay, A. (1982). Colonización y destrucción de bosques en Panamá: ensayos sobre un grave problema ecológico. Asociación Panameña de Antropología.
- Heckadon-Moreno, Stanley. (1983). Cuando se acaban los montes : los campesinos santeños y la colonización de Tonosi. Editorial Universitaria Panamá. Panama´s expanding cattle front: The Santeno Campesinos and the Colonization of the Forests. [Doctoral dissertation, University of Essex
- Heckadon-Moreno, Stanley, Espinosa González, J. (1985). Agonía de la naturaleza: ensayos sobre el costo ambiental del desarrollo panameño.. Panamá: Instituto de Investigación Agropecuaria de Panamá
- Heckadon-Moreno, Stanley. (1986). La Cuenca del Canal de Panamá. Actas de los Seminarios Talleres. Panamá: Impretex
- Heckadon-Moreno, Stanley. (1990). Madera y Leña de Las Milpas: Los Viveros Comunales: Una Alternativa para el Desarrollo Forestal en el Salvador. Centro Agronómico Tropical de Investigación y Enseñanza.

=== Articles ===
==== EPOCAS publications ====
In 1995, Heckadon Moreno began writing for EPOCAS, a historical and cultural publication by the Panamanian newspaper La Prensa. His series of monthly articles are on the topic of natural history in Panama.

==== Panamá América publications ====
Heckadon-Moreno has published over 70 articles for the newspaper Panamá América since 2014 (in Spanish).
