= Shaferocharis =

Scientific classification
- Kingdom: Plantae
- Clade: Tracheophytes
- Clade: Angiosperms
- Clade: Eudicots
- Clade: Asterids
- Order: Gentianales
- Family: Rubiaceae
- Genus: Shaferocharis; Urb.

Genus of plants

Shaferocharis is a genus of flowering plants belonging to the family Rubiaceae.

It is native to the island of Cuba.

The genus name of Shaferocharis is in honour of John Adolph Shafer (1863–1918), an American botanist. The Latin suffix of ocharis is derived from Charis, derived from a Greek word meaning "grace, kindness, and life". It was first described and published in Symb. Antill. Vol.7 on page 412 in 1912.

== Known species ==
According to Kew:

- Shaferocharis cubensis Urb.
- Shaferocharis multiflora Borhidi & O.Muñiz
- Shaferocharis villosa Borhidi & Bisse
