= Annette Aiello =

American entomologist, botanist (*1941)

- Born: May 1, 1941 (age 85); New York City, New York, U.S.
- Scientific career
- Fields: Zoology; entomology
- Workplaces: Smithsonian Tropical Research Institute

Annette A. Aiello (born May 1, 1941) is an American zoologist, botanical entomologist, and professor. She develops academic activities at the Smithsonian Tropical Research Institute.

== Biography ==
Annette Aiello was born on May 1, 1941, in New York City, New York. She initially studied commercial photography, and became interested in botany via nature photography. In 1972, Aiello obtained a BA in biology, magna cum laude, from Brooklyn College. In 1975 she obtained an MA in biology from Harvard University, followed in 1978 by a PhD in biology, defending her thesis: "A Reexamination of Portlandia (Rubiaceae) and Associated Taxa", under the supervision of her advisor, botanist Richard A. Howard. During the late 1970s Aiello studied on the Barro Colorado Island at a field station operated by the Smithsonian.

== Research topics ==
Aiello described her main research topics thus: "My main focus has been the transformations of moths and butterflies, especially caterpillar development, behavior and defenses, and the clues that they and their host plants can contribute to our understanding of species relationships."

== Publications ==
=== Selected articles ===
- Annette Aiello, Brian J. Stucky (2020). "First host plant record for Pacarina (Hemiptera: Cicadidae)"
- Heidi Connahs, Annette Aiello, Sunshine Van Bael & Genoveva Rodriguez-Castaneda (2011). "Caterpillar abundance and parasitism in a seasonally dry versus wet tropical forest of Panama". Journal of Tropical Ecology. 27 (1): 51-584.
- Jean-Pol Vigneron, Priscilla Simonis, Annette Aiello, Annick Bay, Donald M. Windsor, Jean-Francois Colomer & Marie Rassart (2010). "Reverse color sequence in the diffraction of white light by the wing of the male butterfly Pierella luna (Nymphalidae: Satyrinae)". Physical Review E. 82 (2): 021903.
- Milla Suutari, Markus Majaneva, David P. Fewers, Bryson Voirin, Annette Aiello, Thomas Friedl, Adriano G. Chiarello & Jaanika Blomster (2010). "Molecular evidence for a diverse green algal community growing in the hair of sloths and a specific association with Trichophilus welckeri (Chlorophyta, Ulvophyceae)". BMC Evolutionary Biology. 10: 86-98.
- Robert K. Robbins, Annette Aiello, Julie Feinstein, Amy Berkov, Astrid Caldas, Robert C. Busby & Marcelo Duarte (2010). "A tale of two species: detritivory, parapatry, and sexual dimorphism in Lamprospilus collucia and L. orcidia (Lycaenidae: Theclinae: Eumaeini)". Journal of Research on the Lepidoptera. 42 (2003): 64-73.
- Emilio Guerrieri, Martinus E. Huigens, Catalina Estrada, Jozef B. Woelke, Marjolein De Rijk, Nina E. Fatouros, Annette Aiello & John S. Noyes (2010). "Ooencyrtus marcelloi sp. nov. (Hymenoptera: Encyrtidae), an egg parasitoid of Heliconiini (Lepidoptera: Nymphalidae: Heliconiinae) on passion vines (Malpighiales: Passifloraceae) in Central America". Journal of Natural History. 44 (1-2): 81-87.
- J. E. Helson, T. L. Capson, T. Johns, D. M. Windsor & A. Aiello (2009). "Ecologically-guided bioprospecting: the use of aposematic insects as indicators of possible activity against diseases in tropical rain forest plants". Frontiers in Ecology and the Environment. 7 (3): 130-134.
- Donald Davis, Diomedes Quintero A., Roberto Cambra T. & Annette Aiello (2008). "Biology of a new Panamanian bagworm moth (Lepidoptera: Psychidae) with predatory larvae, and eggs individually wrapped in setal cases". Annals of the Entomological Society of America. 101 (4): 689-702.
- A. Aiello & Keith Brown (2007). "Mimetismo por ilusión en una mariposa nocturna de vuelo diurno y de dimorfismo sexual, Dysschema jansonis (Lepidoptera: Arctiidae: Pericopinae)", pp. 105–108, in Egbert Giles Leigh, Edward Allen Herre, Jeremy B. C. Jackson & Fernando Santos Granero (eds). Ecología y Evolución en los Trópicos. First edition, 2006. Panama, Editora Nova Art, S.A.
- Neil Davies, Annette Aiello, James Mallet, Andrew Pomiankowski & Eobert Elliot Silberglied (2007). "La especiación en dos mariposas neotropicales: extensión de la regla de Haldane". pp. 413–421 in Egbert Giles Leigh, Edward Allen Herre, Jeremy B. C. Jackson & Fernando Santos Granero (eds). Ecología y Evolución en los Trópicos. First edition, 2006. Panama, Editora Nova Art, S.A.

=== Books ===
- 2005. Annette Aiello, Vicente Rodríguez Gracia, Vitor Osmar Becker & Olga of Greece. "Mariposas (Lepidoptera) de Bahía Honda e Isla de Canales de Tierra (Veraguas, Panamá)". [Moths and butterflies (Lepidoptera) from Bahía Honda and Canales de Tierra Island (Veraguas, Panama)]. pp. 493–570 (capítulo 9º). In: Santiago Castroviejo, Alicia Ibáñez (eds) Estudios sobre la biodiversidad de la región de Bahía Honda (Veraguas, Panamá). [Studies on the Biodiversity of the Bahía Honda region (Veraguas, Panama)]. Biblioteca de Ciencias 20. Consejo Superior de Investigaciones Científicas. Instituto de España. Real Academia de Ciencias Exactas, Físicas y Naturales. Madrid. 835 pp.
- 2001. Annette Aiello. "Las orugas de Panamá", pp. 118 – 125. In: Stanley Heckadon Moreno (ed.) Panamá: Puente Biológico: Las Charlas Smithsonian del Mes: 1996 1999. Instituto Smithsonian de Investigaciones Tropicales, Balboa, República de Panamá. xx + 233 pp. ISBN 9962 614 01 5
- 1992. Diomedes Quintero & Annette Aiello. Insects of Panama and Mesoamerica: Selected Studies. Oxford Science Publications. Edición ilustrada Oxford University Press. 692 pp. ISBN 0198540183
- 1978. Annette Aiello. "A re-examination of Portlandia (Rubiaceae) and associated taxa". Journal of the Arnold Arboretum. 60 (1) Ed. Harvard University, 89 pp.
