= Hintonia latiflora =

Conservation status
- Least Concern (IUCN 3.1)

Scientific classification
- Kingdom: Plantae
- Clade: Tracheophytes
- Clade: Angiosperms
- Clade: Eudicots
- Clade: Asterids
- Order: Gentianales
- Family: Rubiaceae
- Genus: Hintonia
- Species: H. latiflora

Binomial name
- Hintonia latiflora (Sessé et Moc. ex DC.) Bullock

Synonyms
- Hintonia standleyana Portlandia pterosperma Coutarea latiflora Coutarea pterosperma Hintonia latiflora var. leiantha

Species of plant

Hintonia latiflora is a plant species in the genus Hintonia.

Hintonia latiflora contains the neoflavonoid coutareagenin (5-hydroxy-7-methoxy-4-(3,4-dihydroxyphenyl)-2H-benzo-1-pyran-2-ol), an antidiabetic active substance.
