= Salzmannia =

Scientific classification
- Kingdom: Plantae
- Clade: Tracheophytes
- Clade: Angiosperms
- Clade: Eudicots
- Clade: Asterids
- Order: Gentianales
- Family: Rubiaceae
- Genus: Salzmannia; DC.

Genus of plants

Salzmannia is a genus of flowering plants belonging to the family Rubiaceae.

It is native to northern Venezuela and Brazil.

The genus name of Salzmannia is in honour of Philipp Salzmann (1781–1851), a German doctor, botanist and entomologist. It was first described and published in Prodr. Vol.4 on page 617 in 1830.

== Known species ==
According to Kew:

- Salzmannia arborea J.G.Jardim
- Salzmannia naiguatensis (Steyerm.) Paudyal & Delprete
- Salzmannia nitida DC.
- Salzmannia plowmanii (Delprete) Paudyal & Delprete
