= Paracorynanthe =

Scientific classification
- Kingdom: Plantae
- Clade: Tracheophytes
- Clade: Angiosperms
- Clade: Eudicots
- Clade: Asterids
- Order: Gentianales
- Family: Rubiaceae
- Genus: Paracorynanthe; Capuron

Genus of plants

Paracorynanthe is a genus of flowering plants belonging to the family Rubiaceae.

Its native range is Madagascar.

== Species ==
Species:

- Paracorynanthe antankarana Capuron ex J.-F.Leroy
- Paracorynanthe uropetala Capuron
