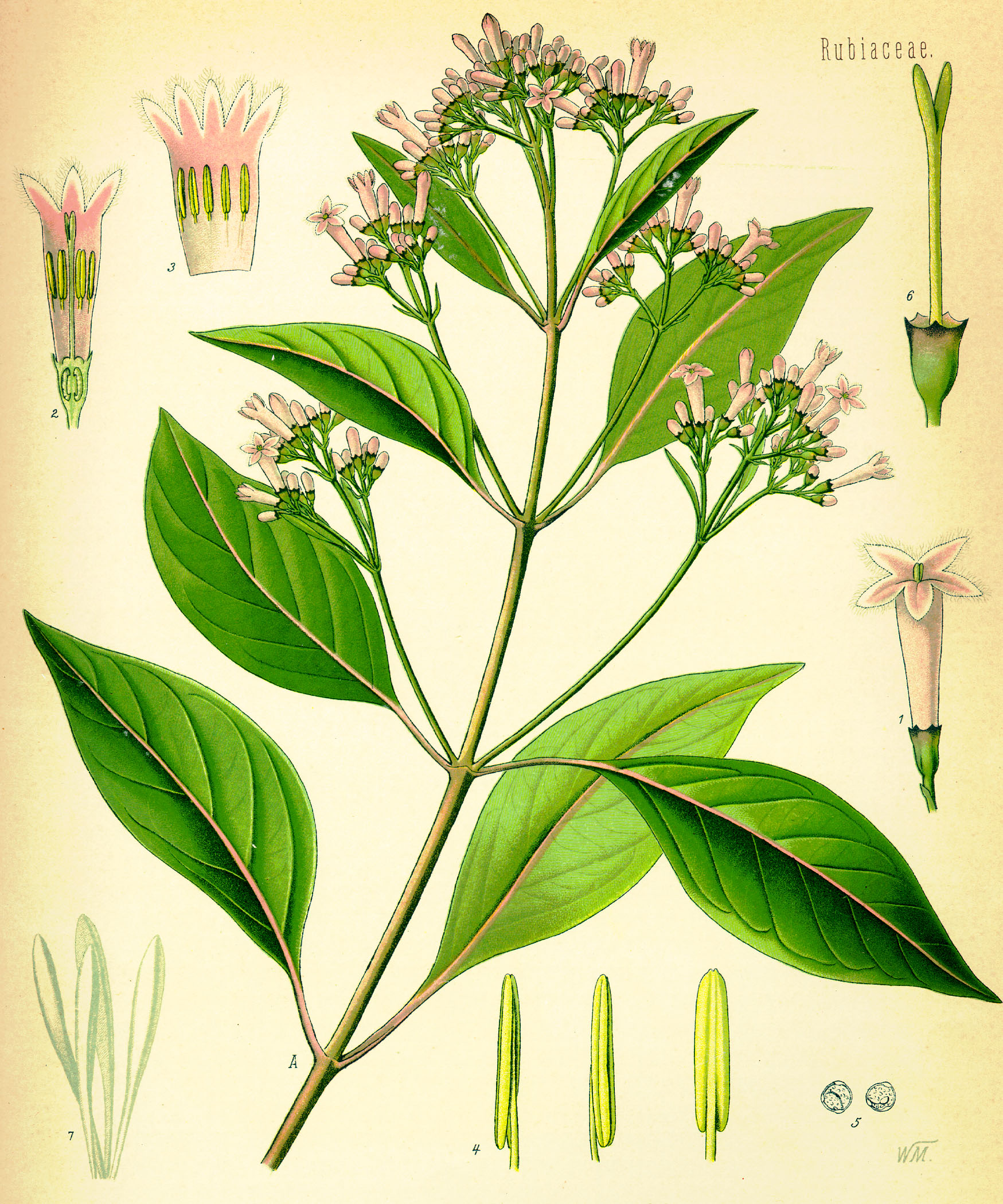
- Cinchona officinalis

Scientific classification
- Kingdom: Plantae
- Clade: Tracheophytes
- Clade: Angiosperms
- Clade: Eudicots
- Clade: Asterids
- Order: Gentianales
- Family: Rubiaceae
- Subfamily: Cinchonoideae; Raf.

= Cinchonoideae =

Subfamily of plants

Cinchonoideae is a subfamily of flowering plants in the family Rubiaceae and contains about 1700 species in 10 tribes.

== Tribes ==
- Chiococceae Benth. & Hook.f.
- Cinchoneae DC.
- Guettardeae DC.
- Hamelieae A.Rich. ex DC.
- Hymenodictyeae Razafim. & B.Bremer
- Hillieae Bremek. ex S.P.Darwin
- Isertieae A.Rich. ex DC.
- Naucleeae DC. ex Miq.
- Rondeletieae DC. ex Miq.
- Strumpfieae Delprete & T.J.Motley
