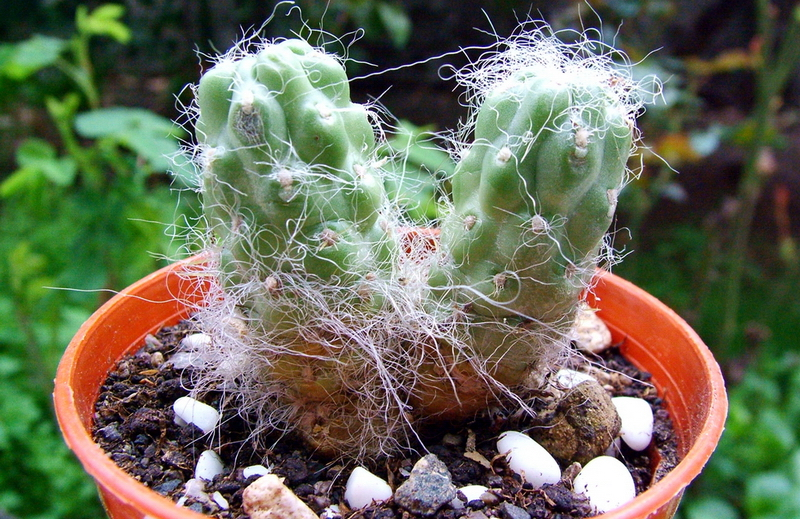

Scientific classification
- Kingdom: Plantae
- Clade: Tracheophytes
- Clade: Angiosperms
- Clade: Eudicots
- Order: Caryophyllales
- Family: Cactaceae
- Genus: Austrocylindropuntia
- Species: A. floccosa

Binomial name
- Austrocylindropuntia floccosa (Salm-Dyck) F.Ritter

= Austrocylindropuntia floccosa =

Species of plant

Austrocylindropuntia floccosa, also called waraqu (Aymara and Quechua for cactus, Hispanicized spelling Huaraco) is found in the high plains of Northern Peru and Bolivia.

== Uses ==
=== Fences ===
Waraqu are cultivated for the use of planting them close together to make living fences.

=== Fruit ===
The Austrocylindropuntia floccosa fruit is edible.
