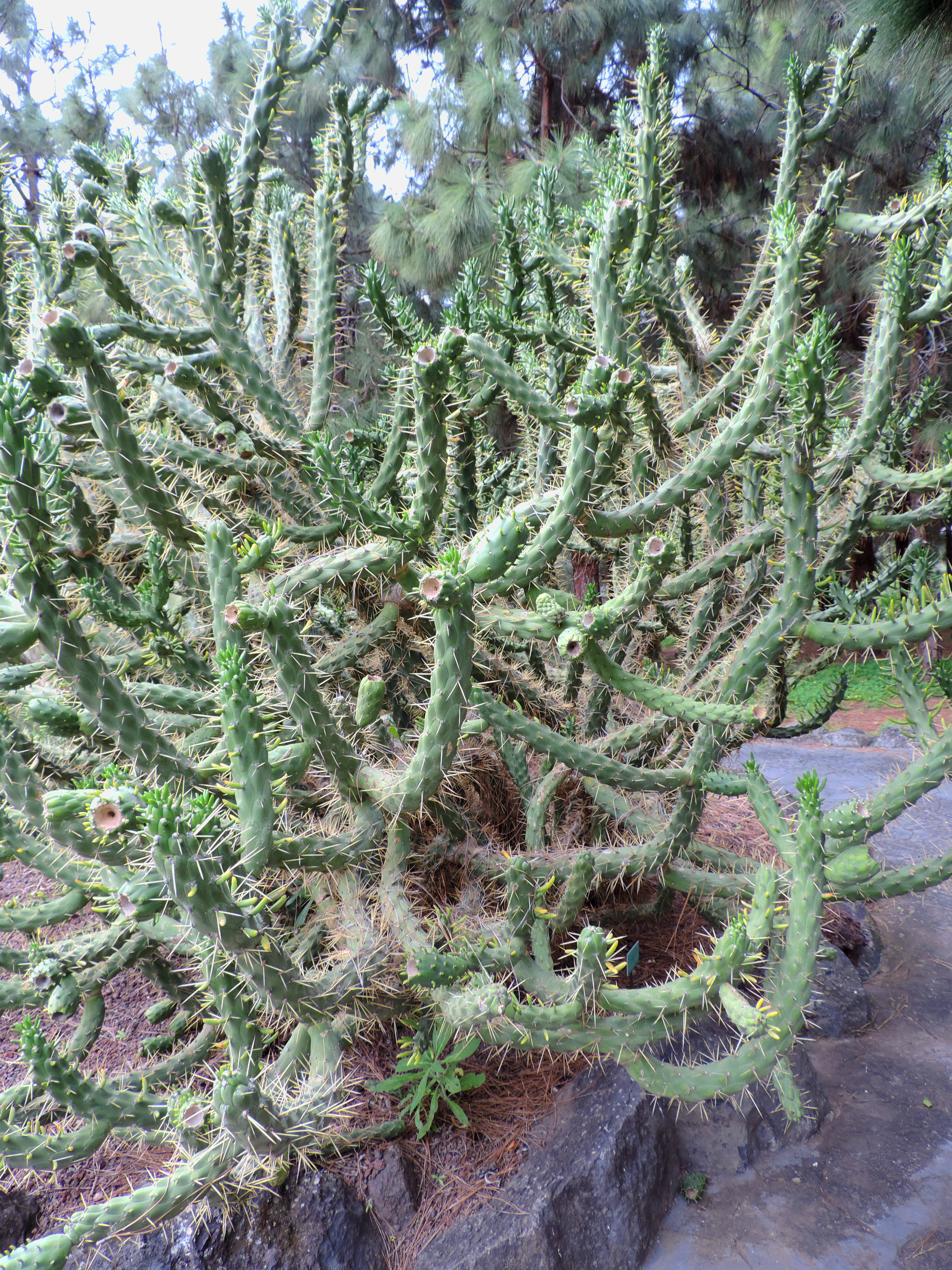
- Austrocylindropuntia subulata

Scientific classification
- Kingdom: Plantae
- Clade: Tracheophytes
- Clade: Angiosperms
- Clade: Eudicots
- Order: Caryophyllales
- Family: Cactaceae
- Subfamily: Opuntioideae
- Tribe: Tephrocacteae
- Genus: Austrocylindropuntia; Backeb.

Species
- See text.

= Austrocylindropuntia =

Genus of cacti

Austrocylindropuntia is a genus of cacti (family Cactaceae) with eight recognized species as of December 2025, which were once included in the genus Opuntia. All are native to South America, although some have been introduced elsewhere.

== Species ==
As of December 2025, Plants of the World Online accepted the following species:

Image	Scientific name	Distribution
	Austrocylindropuntia cylindrica	Ecuador (Azuay, Bolivar, Canar, Carchi, Chimborazo, Cotopaxi, Imbabura, Napo, Pichincha, Sucumbios, Tungurahua)
	Austrocylindropuntia floccosa	Peru, Bolivia
	Austrocylindropuntia lagopus	Peru, Bolivia
	Austrocylindropuntia lauliacoana F.Ritter	Peru
	Austrocylindropuntia pachypus	Peru (Ancash, Lima)
	Austrocylindropuntia shaferi	Argentina (Jujuy)
	Austrocylindropuntia subulata	Peru (Cusco, Lima, Puno )
	Austrocylindropuntia vestita	Argentina, Bolivia
