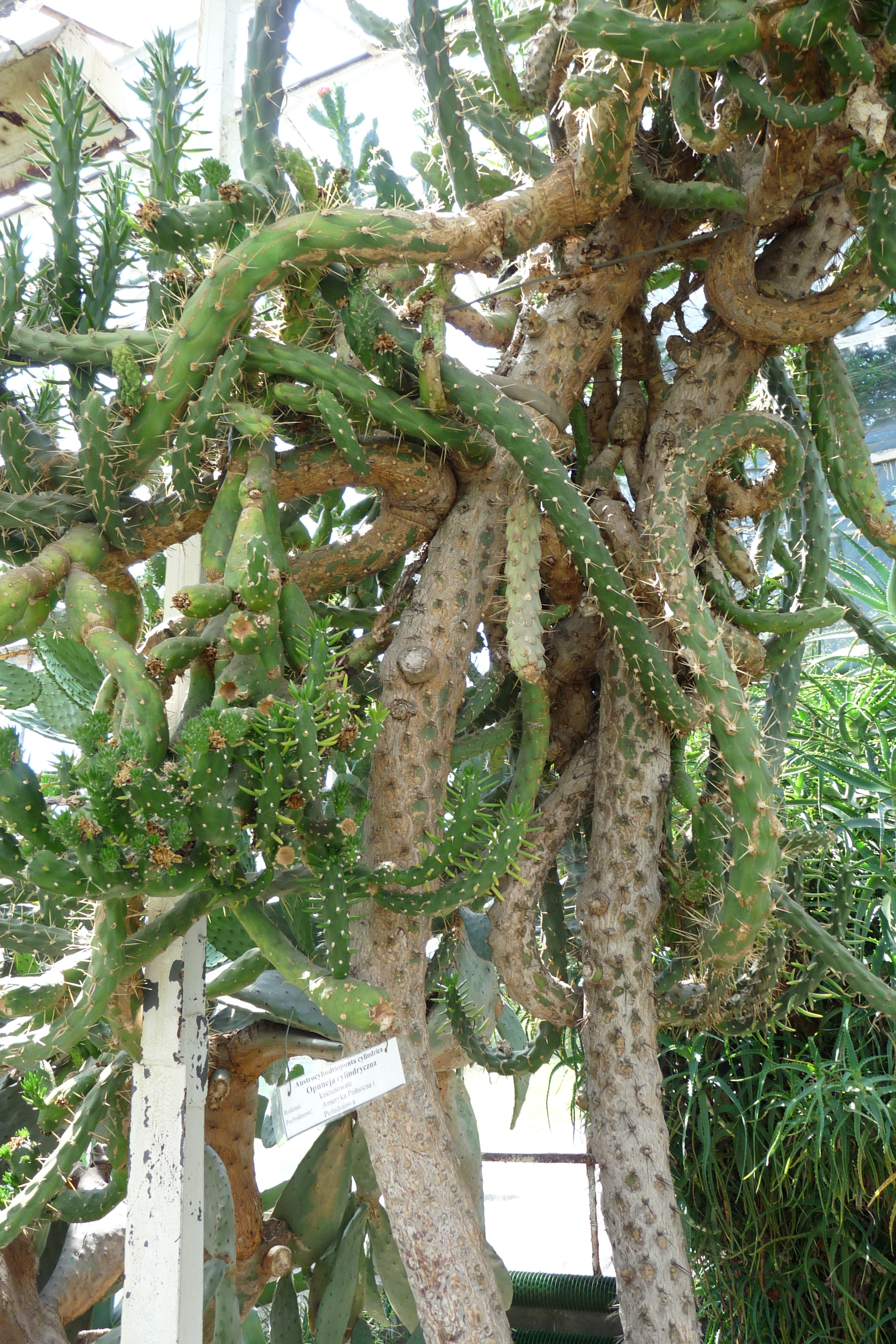
- Growth form of a large individual
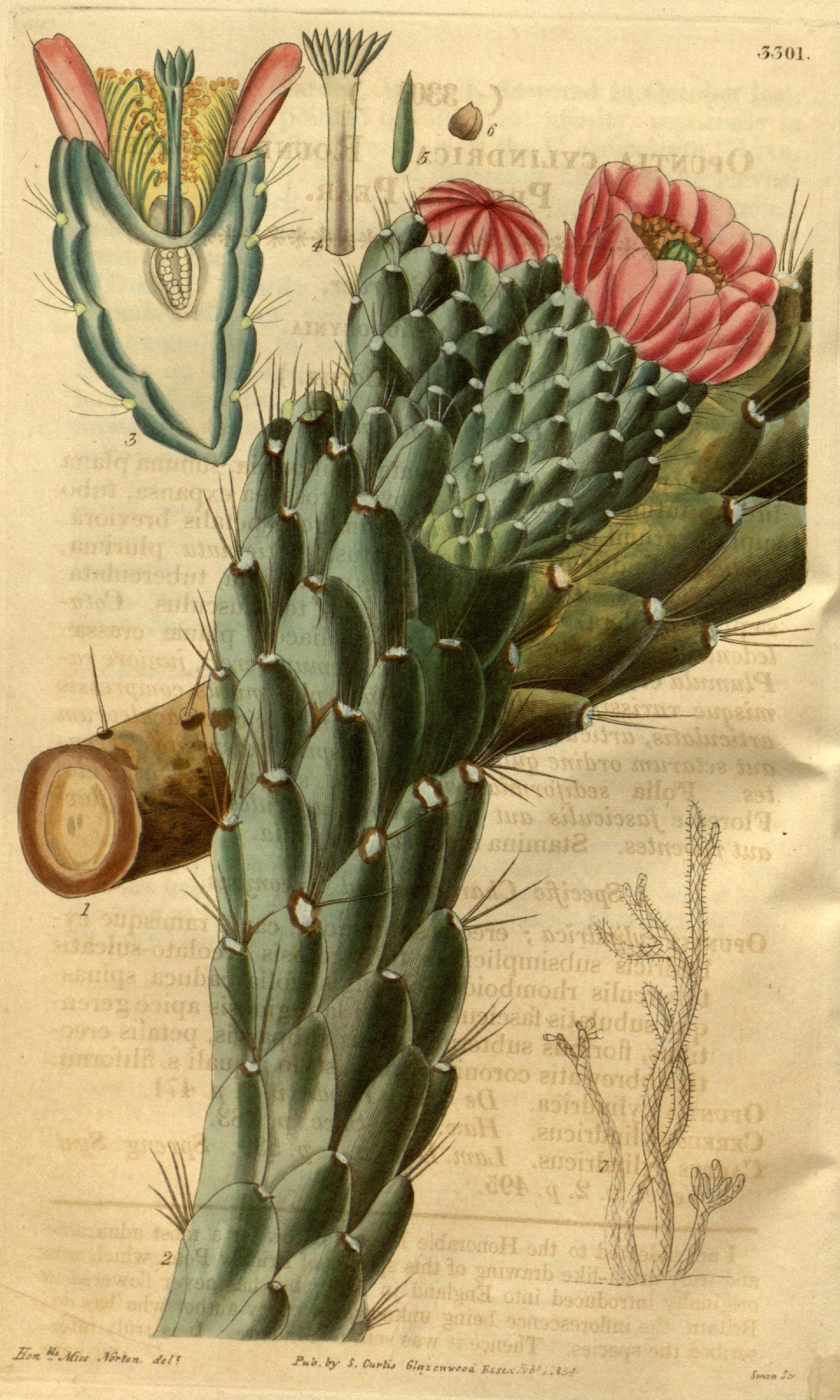
- Botanical illustration

Scientific classification
- Kingdom: Plantae
- Clade: Tracheophytes
- Clade: Angiosperms
- Clade: Eudicots
- Order: Caryophyllales
- Family: Cactaceae
- Genus: Austrocylindropuntia
- Species: A. cylindrica

Binomial name
- Austrocylindropuntia cylindrica (Lam.) Backeb.

Synonyms
- List: Austrocylindropuntia intermedia Rauh & Backeb.; Cactus coranarius Cav.; Cactus cylindricus Lam.; Cereus cylindricus (Lam.) Haw.; Cylindropuntia cylindrica (Lam.) F.M.Knuth; Cylindropuntia intermedia Rauh & Backeb.; Opuntia bradleyi G.D.Rowley; Opuntia cylindrica DC.

= Austrocylindropuntia cylindrica =

Species of flowering plant

Austrocylindropuntia cylindrica (syn. Opuntia cylindrica), the cane cactus, is a species of flowering plant in the family Cactaceae.

== Distribution and habitat ==
It is native to Colombia, Ecuador, and Peru, and it has been introduced to the Canary Islands, Morocco, Eritrea, Ethiopia, South Africa, Australia, and New Zealand. A popular ornamental, it is an invasive species in Europe, South Africa, and Australia. Due to a misidentification, for a time this species was erroneously thought to contain mescaline.

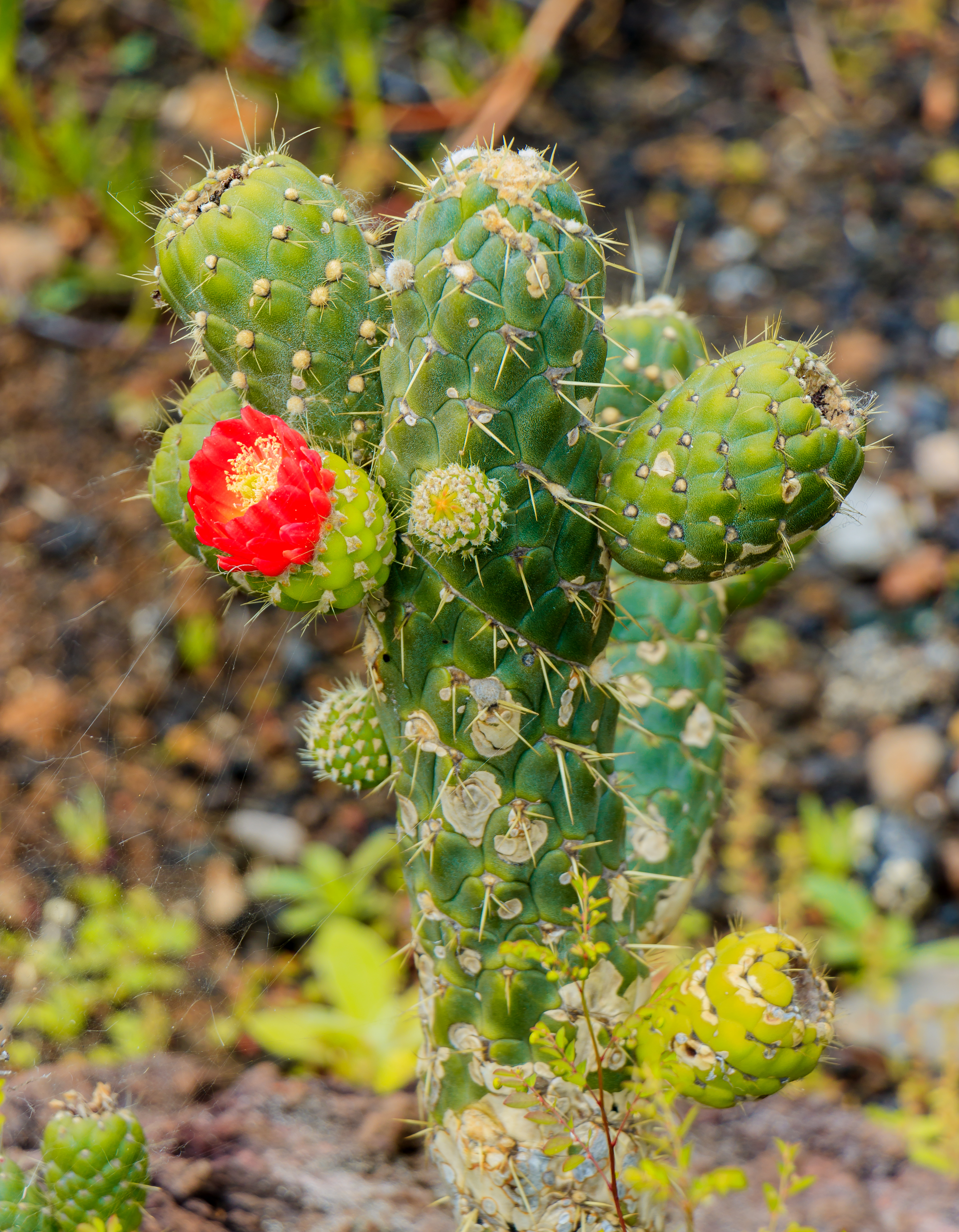
In bloom at the Madeira Botanical Garden

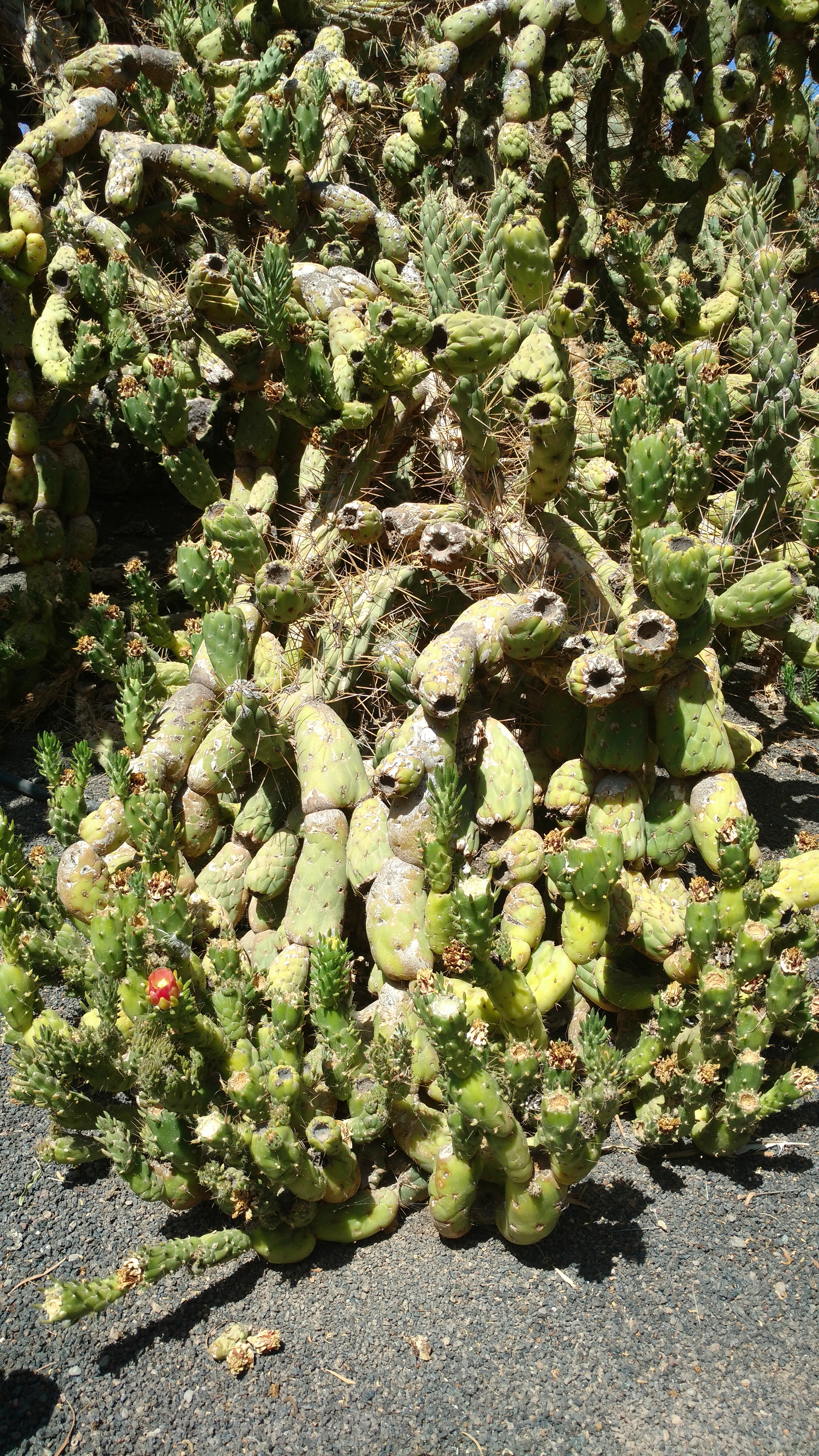
On Fuerteventura

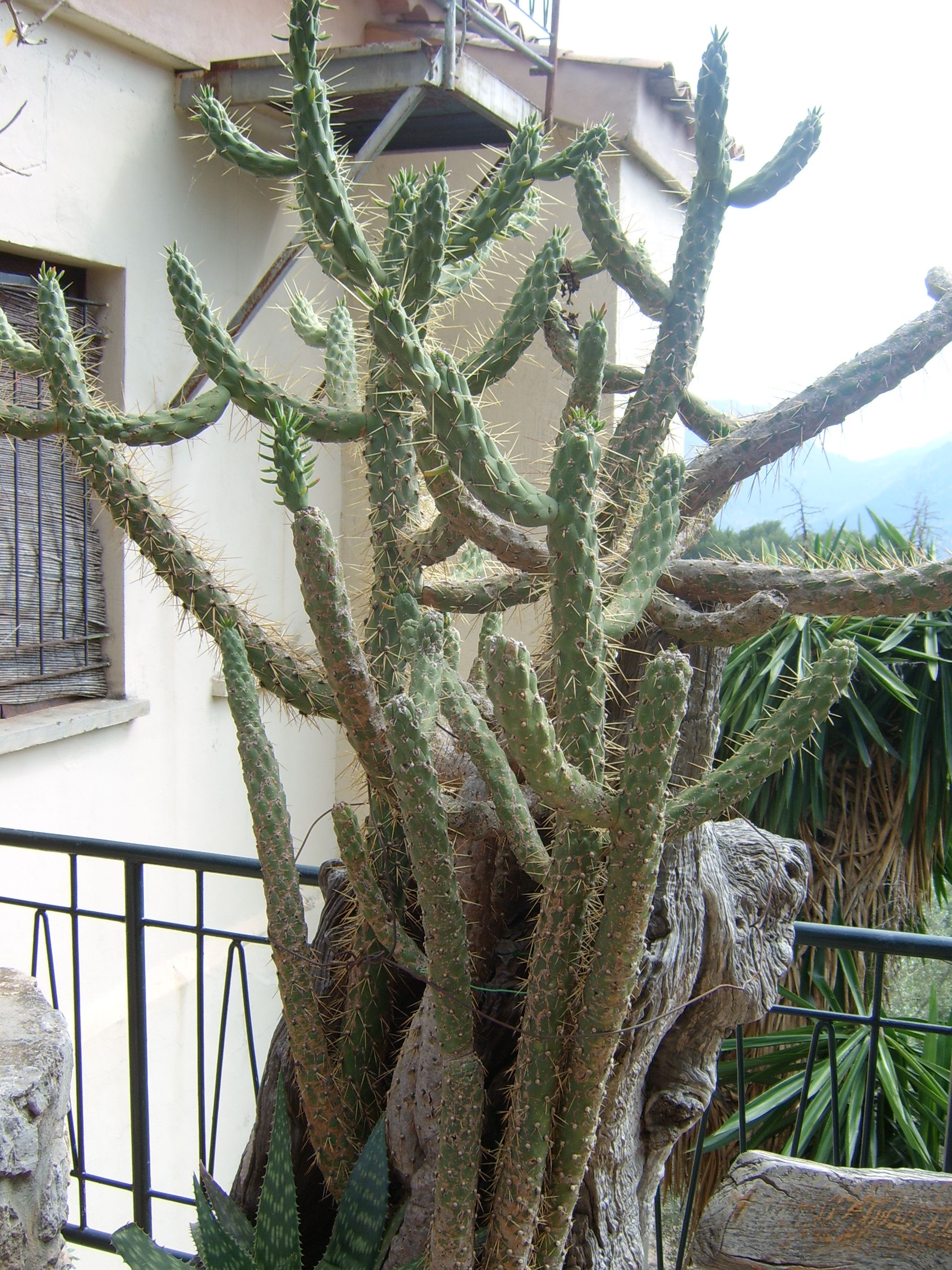
On Mallorca

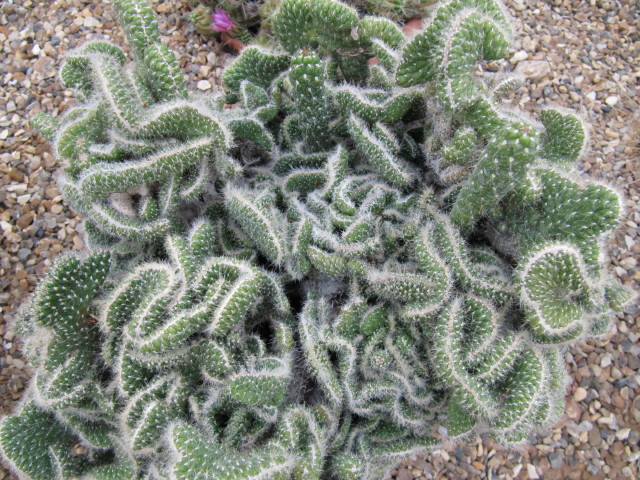
Cristate individual

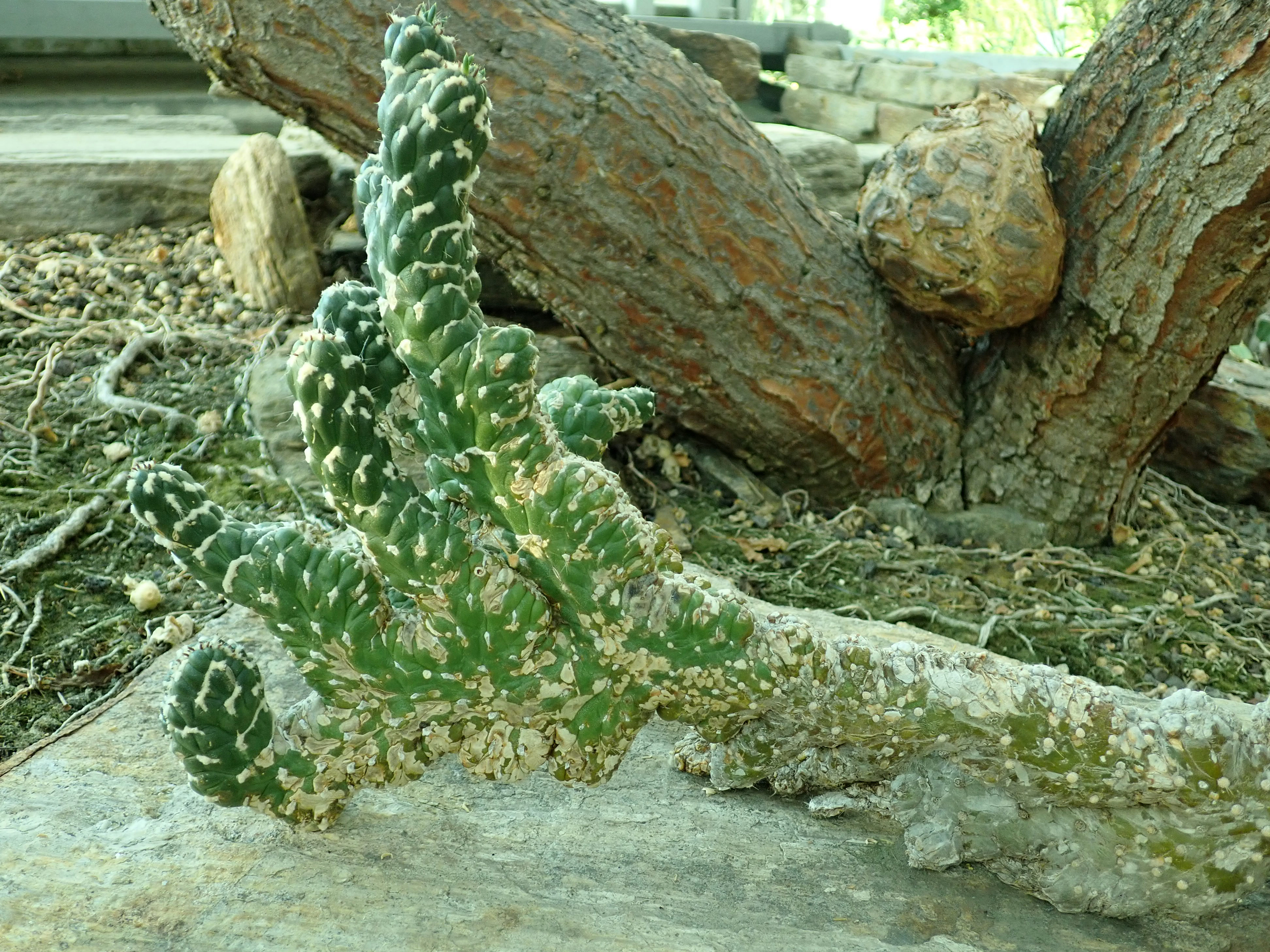
Another cristate individual

== Constituents ==
Austrocylindropuntia cylindrica as the whole dried plant was once reported to contain about 0.9% mescaline. However, it was subsequently determined that this was in error due to species misidentification and the actual species was Trichocereus pachanoi. Other research has found that genuine Austrocylindropuntia cylindrica contains no measurable alkaloids.
