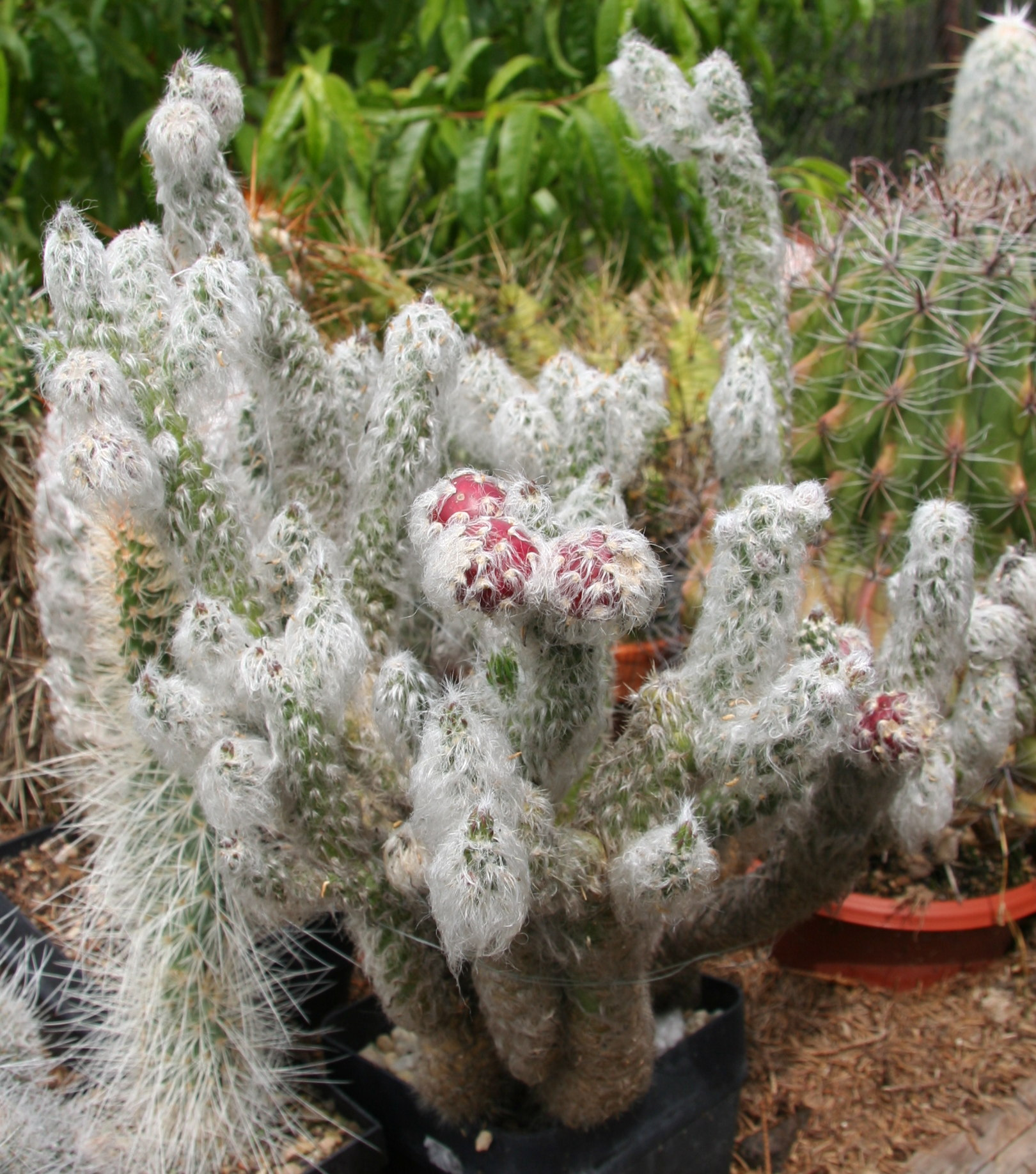
- Astrocylindropuntia vestita

Conservation status
- Least Concern (IUCN 3.1)

Scientific classification
- Kingdom: Plantae
- Clade: Tracheophytes
- Clade: Angiosperms
- Clade: Eudicots
- Order: Caryophyllales
- Family: Cactaceae
- Genus: Austrocylindropuntia
- Species: A. vestita

Binomial name
- Austrocylindropuntia vestita (Salm-Dyck) Backeb.

Synonyms
- Cylindropuntia vestita (Salm-Dyck) Backeb.; Opuntia vestita Salm-Dyck; Pseudotephrocactus vestitus (Salm-Dyck) Frič & Schelle; Trichopuntia vestita (Salm-Dyck) Guiggi

= Austrocylindropuntia vestita =

Species of cactus

Austrocylindropuntia vestita, also known as old man opuntia, cotton pole and cotton coral cactus, is a species of Austrocylindropuntia that grows in high altitude grasslands on rocky soils in northwest Argentina and Bolivia. It is a slender columnar green cacti covered with white hairs.
