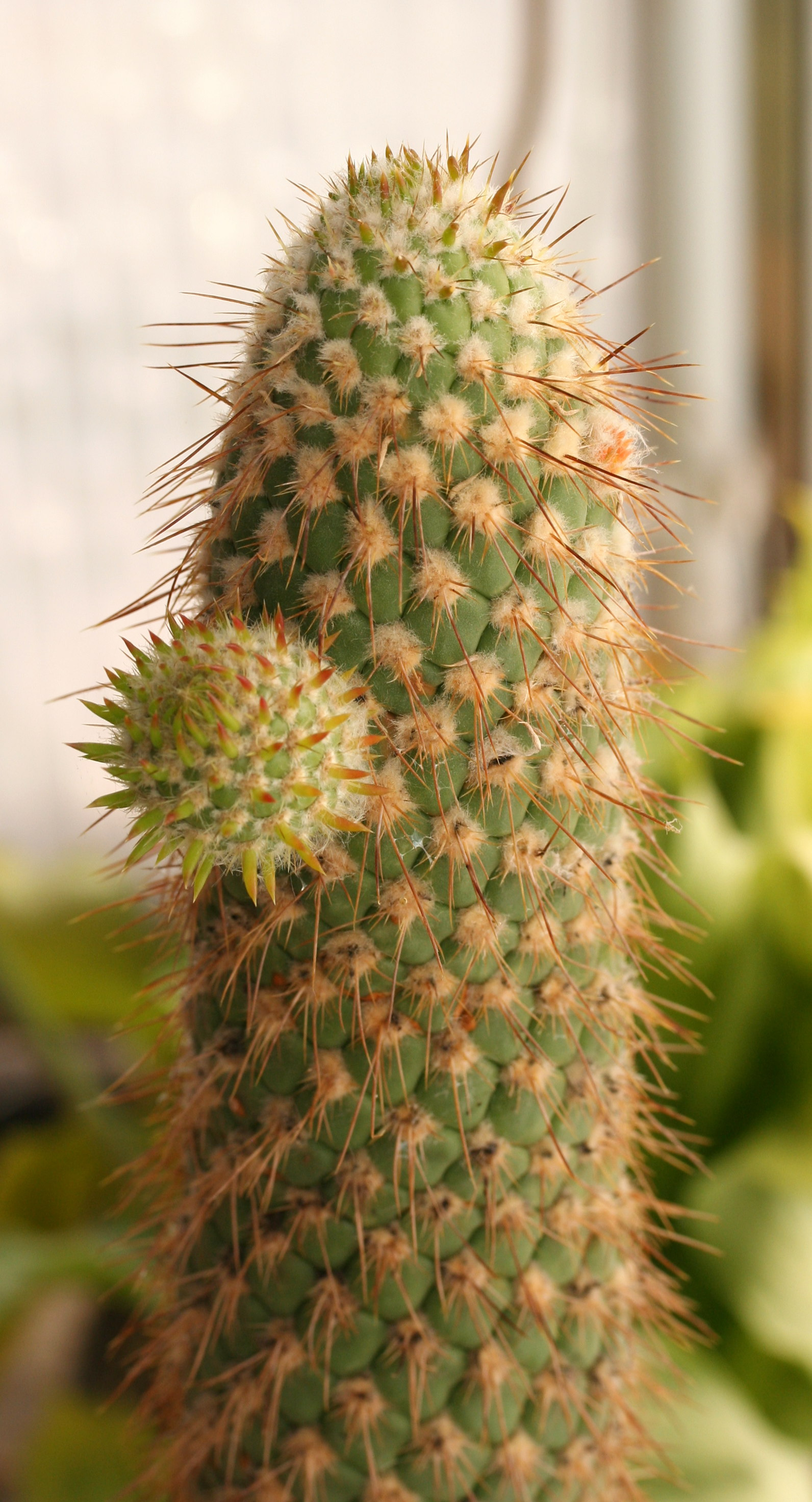

Conservation status
- Near Threatened (IUCN 3.1)

Scientific classification
- Kingdom: Plantae
- Clade: Tracheophytes
- Clade: Angiosperms
- Clade: Eudicots
- Order: Caryophyllales
- Family: Cactaceae
- Genus: Austrocylindropuntia
- Species: A. pachypus

Binomial name
- Austrocylindropuntia pachypus (K.Schum.) Backeb., 1942

Synonyms
- Cylindropuntia pachypus (K.Schum.) Backeb., 1936; Opuntia pachypus K. Schum., 1904 (basionym); Peruviopuntia pachypus (K.Schum.) Guiggi, 2011

= Austrocylindropuntia pachypus =

Species of plant

Austrocylindropuntia pachypus is a species of succulent flowering plant in the genus Austrocylindropuntia, within the family Cactaceae. It is endemic to western Peru.

== Description ==
Austrocylindropuntia pachypus is a species of cactus with a solitary habit, and with little to no branching at the base. The stems are articulated, cylindrical, and green in color. Each segment can grow to 1 m in length and 8 cm in diameter.

The stems have a series of tubercles situated in a spiral pattern. On these, the areoles are large and tightly-spaced, with 20 or more spines measuring up to 2 cm in length, although some central spines may grow longer.

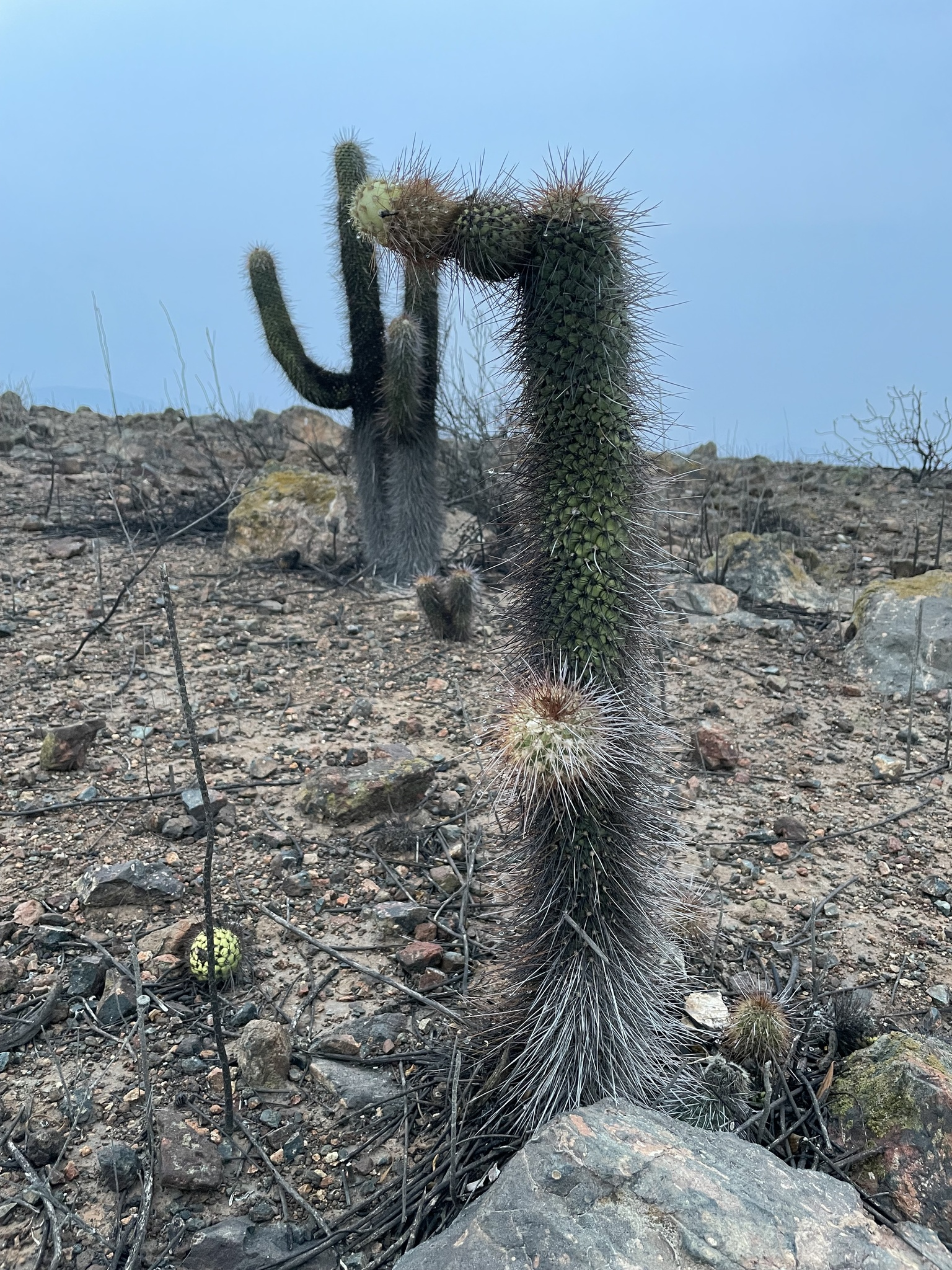
In habitat near Lima, Peru

The flowers are bright red in color and measure up to 7 cm long. The pericarpel is long and thick, and may appear similar to a small lateral branch.

== Distribution and habitat ==
Austrocylindropuntia pachypus is native to western Peru, where it grows in desert and dry scrubland at elevations of 0 to 500 meters above sea level.

== Taxonomy ==
This species was first descriped as Opuntia pachypus, a name published in 1904 by the German botanist Karl Moritz Schumann in the scientific journal Monatsschrift für Kakteenkunde 14: 26.

Later, the German botanist Curt Backeberg transferred this species to the genus Austrocylindropuntia, renaming it Austrocylindropuntia pachypus. He registered these changes in the scientific journal Cactaceae. Jahrbücher der Deutschen Kakteen-Gesellschaft 1941 (2): 13, published in 1942.

=== Etymology ===
- Austrocylindropuntia: the genus name is derived from the Latin terms auster, -tralis; (meaning "southern"), the Greek term κύλινδρος (kýlindros); (meaning "cylinder"), and the genus Opuntia, (or, as a combination of the latter two terms, the genus Cylindropuntia); this references the cylindrical shape of the stems that appear similar to the genera Opuntia and Cylindropuntia.
- pachypus: the specific epithet is derived from the Greek terms pachys (meaning "thick" or "fat") and pous (meaning "foot"); this references this species' long, thick pericarpel.

== Conservation status ==
On the IUCN Red List, Austrocylindropuntia pachypus is classified as being Near Threatened (NT).

== Cultivation ==
This species is cultivated mainly as an ornamental. It may be propagated vegetatively by cuttings, as well as by seed.

== Gallery ==
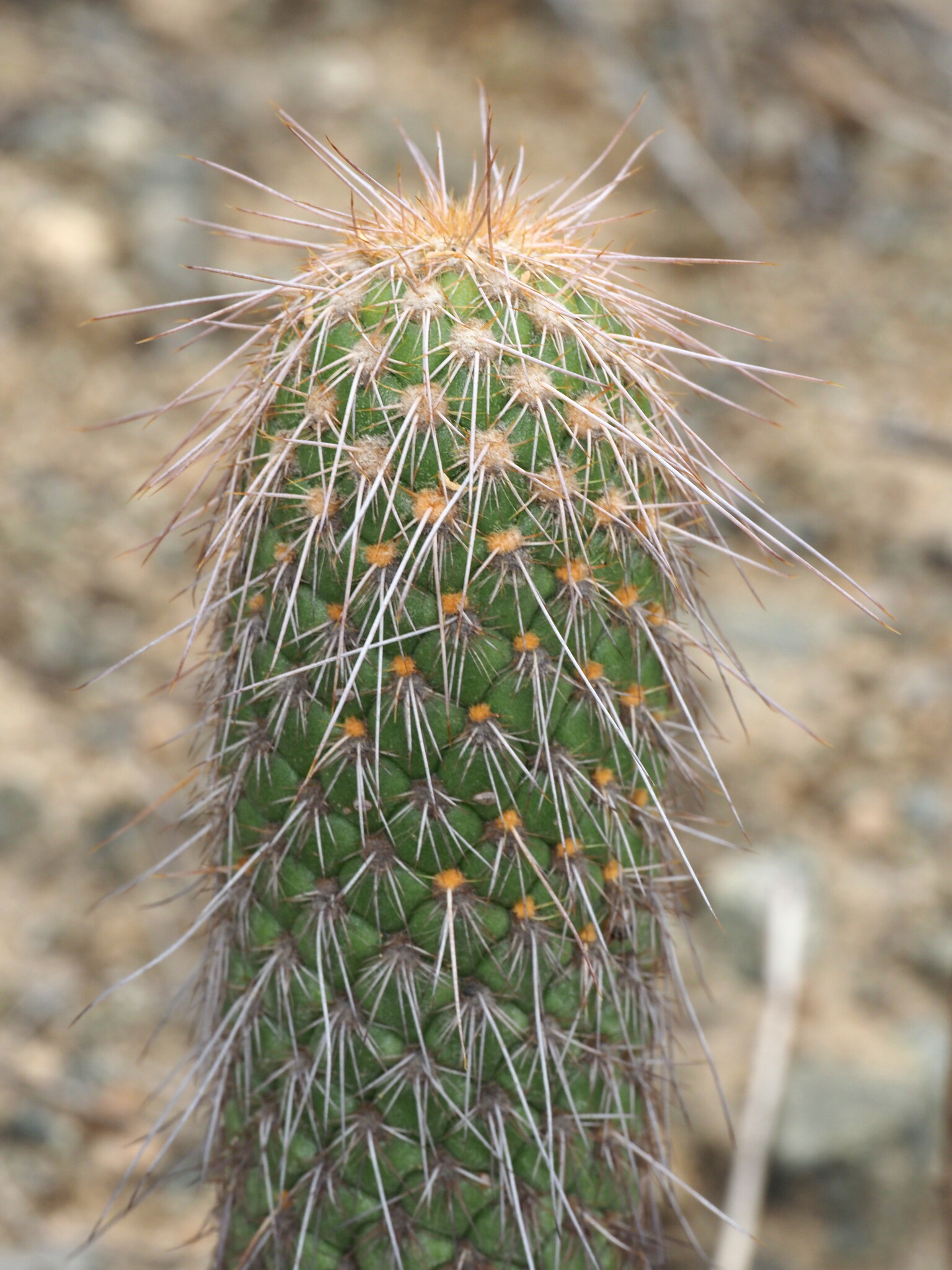
Spines

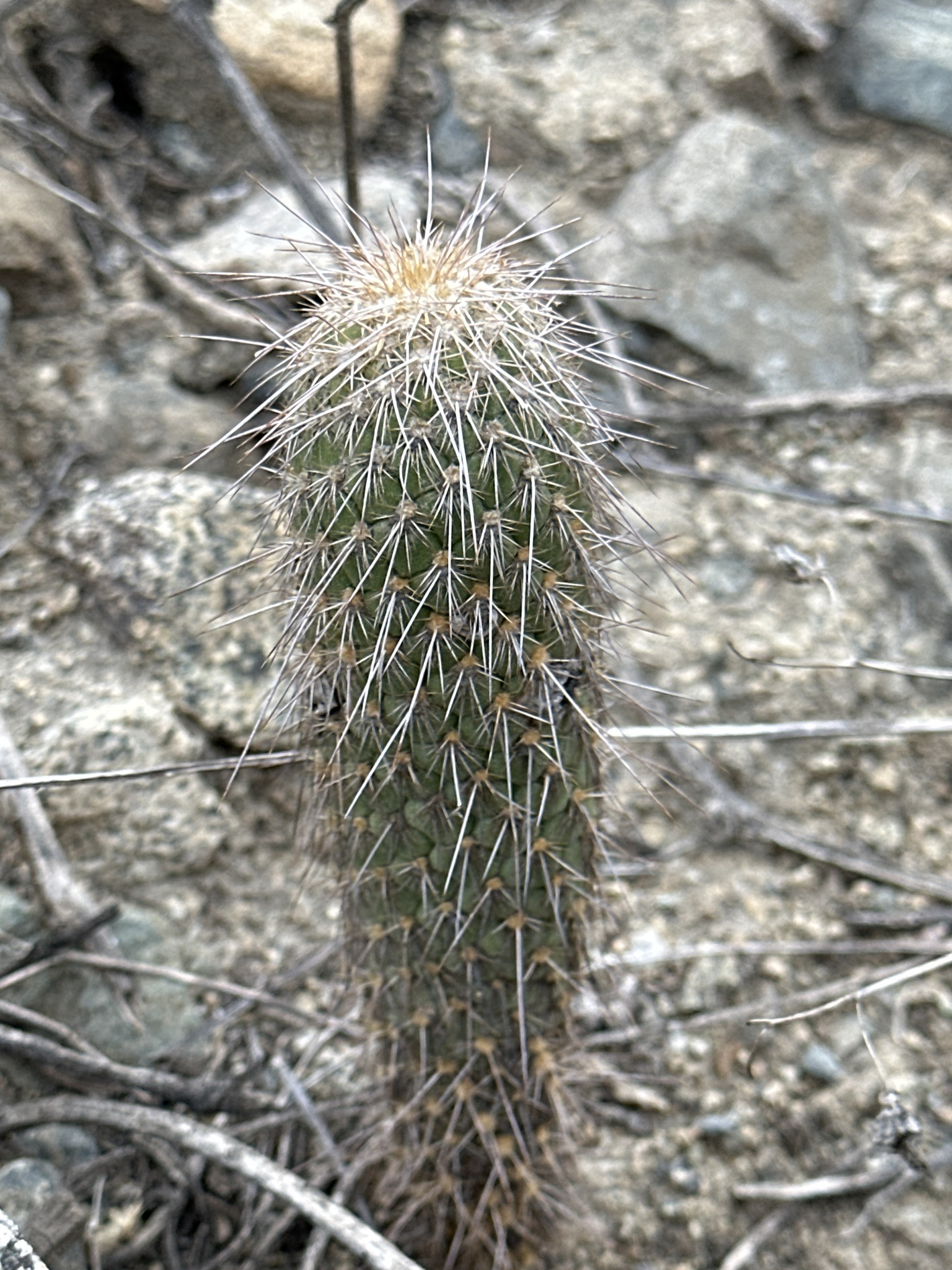
In habitat near Lima, Peru

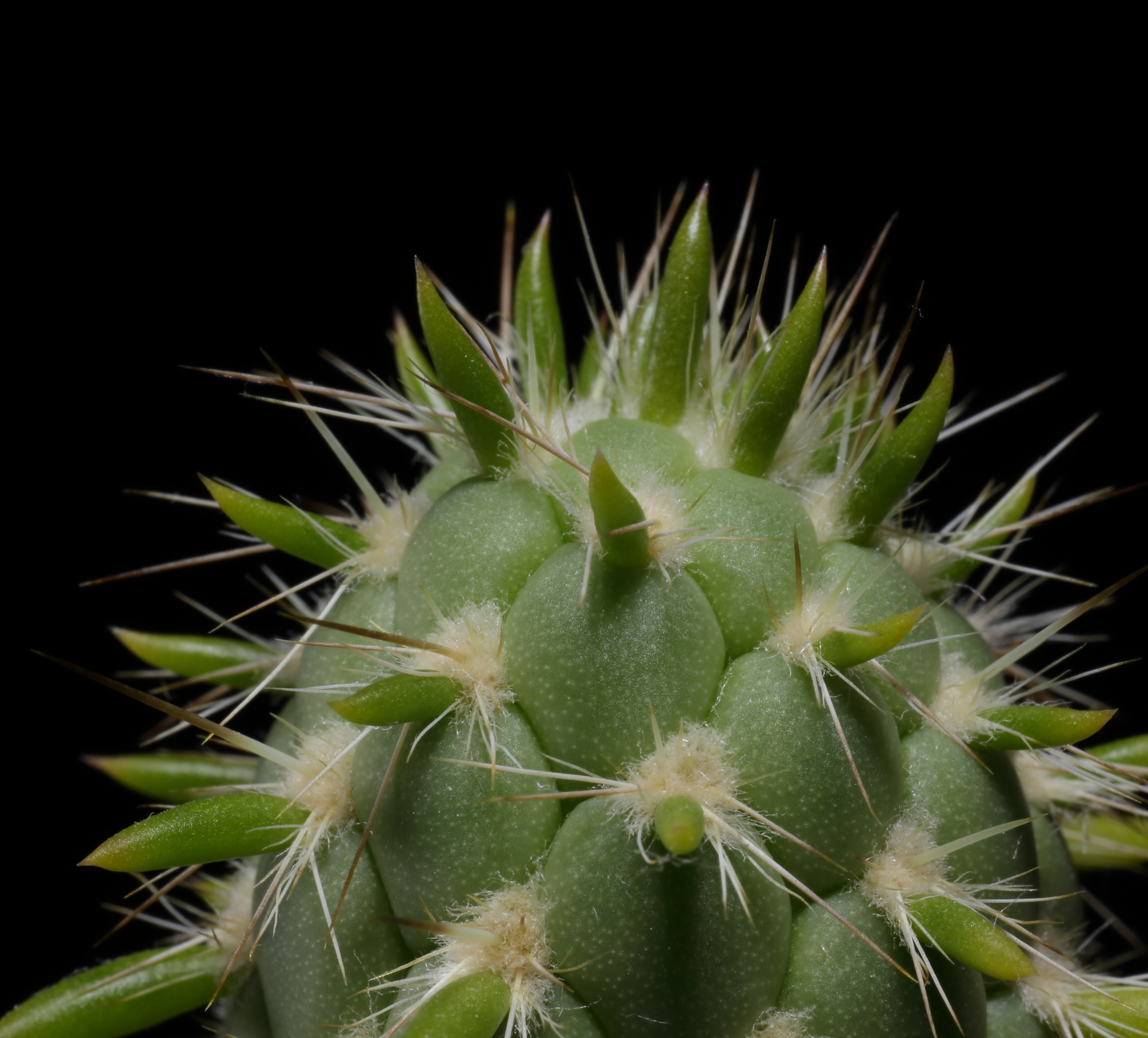
Leaves

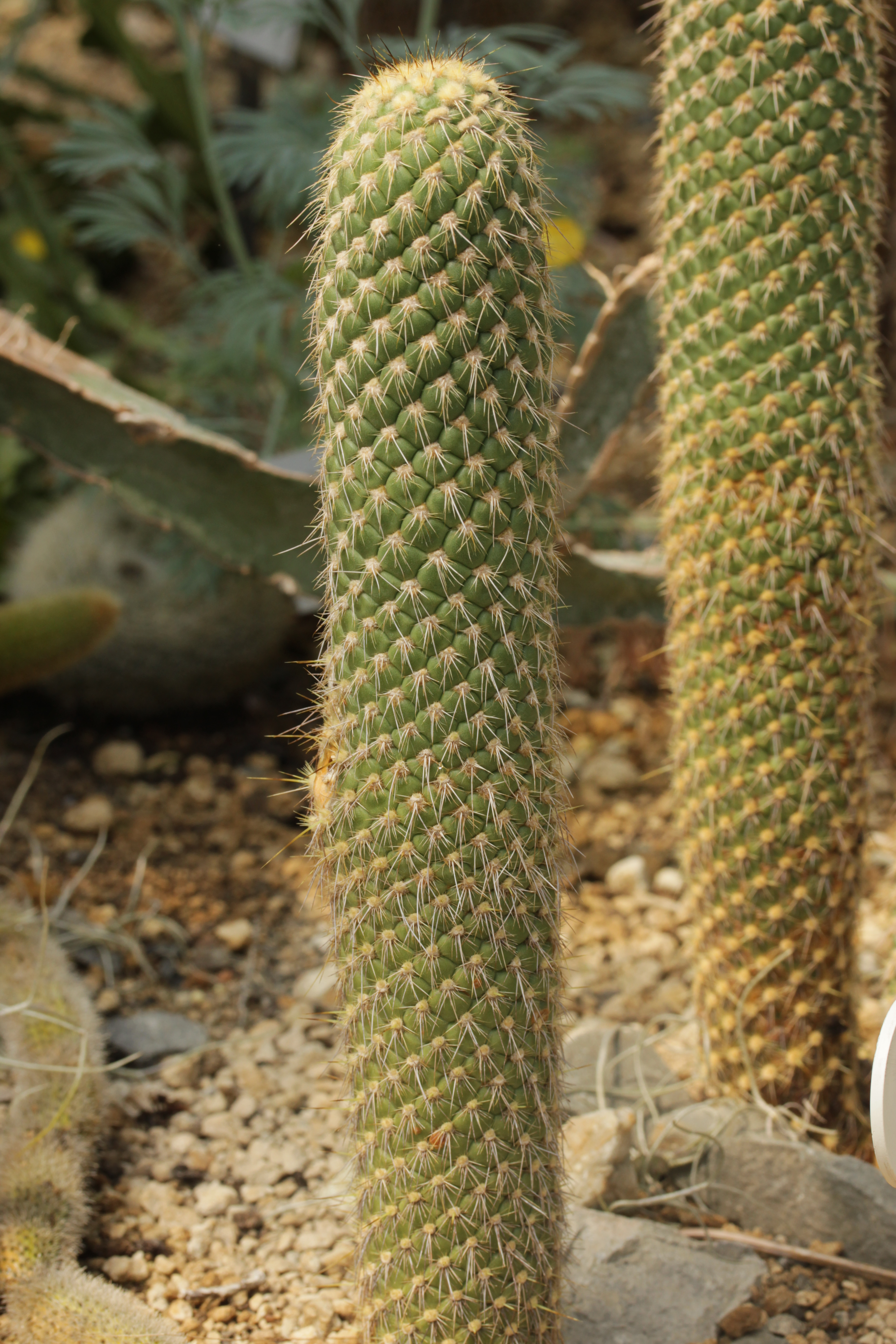
Stem
