= Austrocylindropuntia shaferi =

Conservation status
- Least Concern (IUCN 3.1)

Scientific classification
- Kingdom: Plantae
- Clade: Tracheophytes
- Clade: Angiosperms
- Clade: Eudicots
- Order: Caryophyllales
- Family: Cactaceae
- Genus: Austrocylindropuntia
- Species: A. shaferi

Binomial name
- Austrocylindropuntia shaferi (Britton & Rose) Backeb.

Synonyms
- This species has 16 synonyms: (see text)

Species of plant

Austrocylindropuntia shaferi is a species of succulent flowering plant in the genus Austrocylindropuntia, within the family Cactaceae. It is native from western Bolivia to northwestern Argentina.

== Description ==
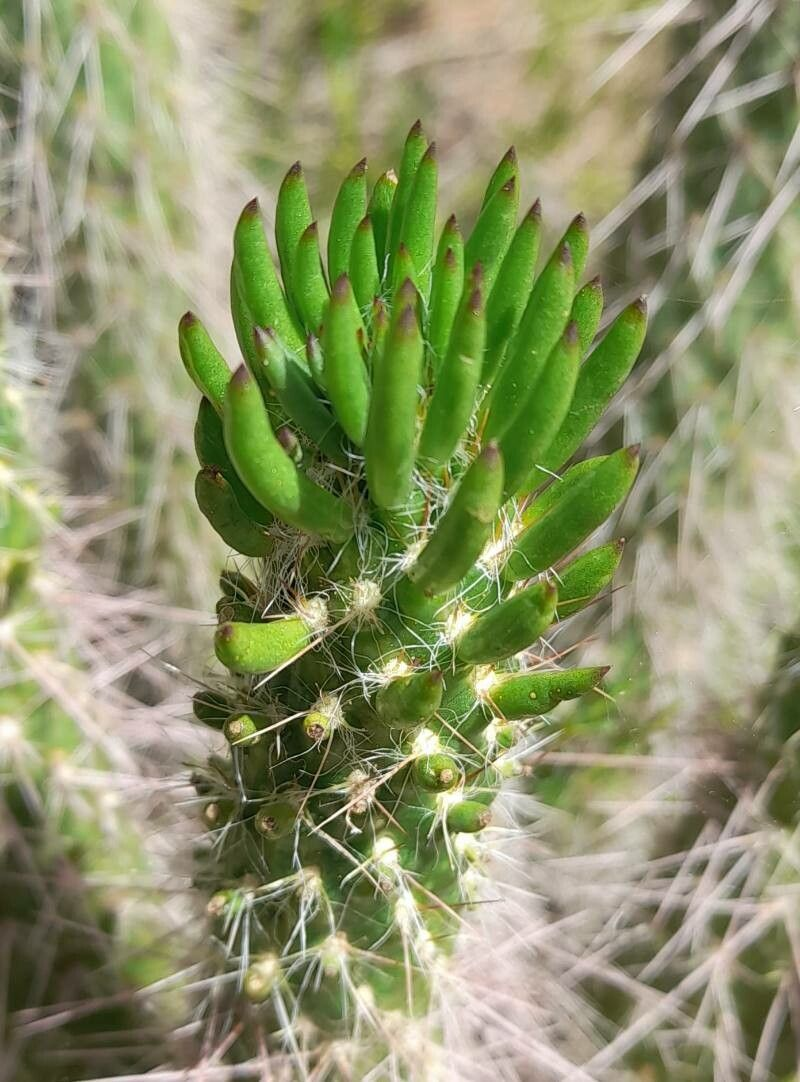
Stem with leaves

Austrocylindropuntia shaferi is a small species of cactus with an upright gworth, reaching 30 cm or more in height. The stems are slightly divided into sections or segments, which vary from cylindrical to slightly bulging in shape. They are green in color, and each measures approximately 15 cm in length and 3 cm in diameter.

The stems exhibit a series of tubercles, upon which are situated small, tightly-spaced areoles with 15 narrow, needle-shaped spines each. These spines are weak, and measure up to 5 cm in length. Sometimes, trichomes or bristles also form on the areoles. Rudimentary leaves measuring up to 0.6 cm in length are present.

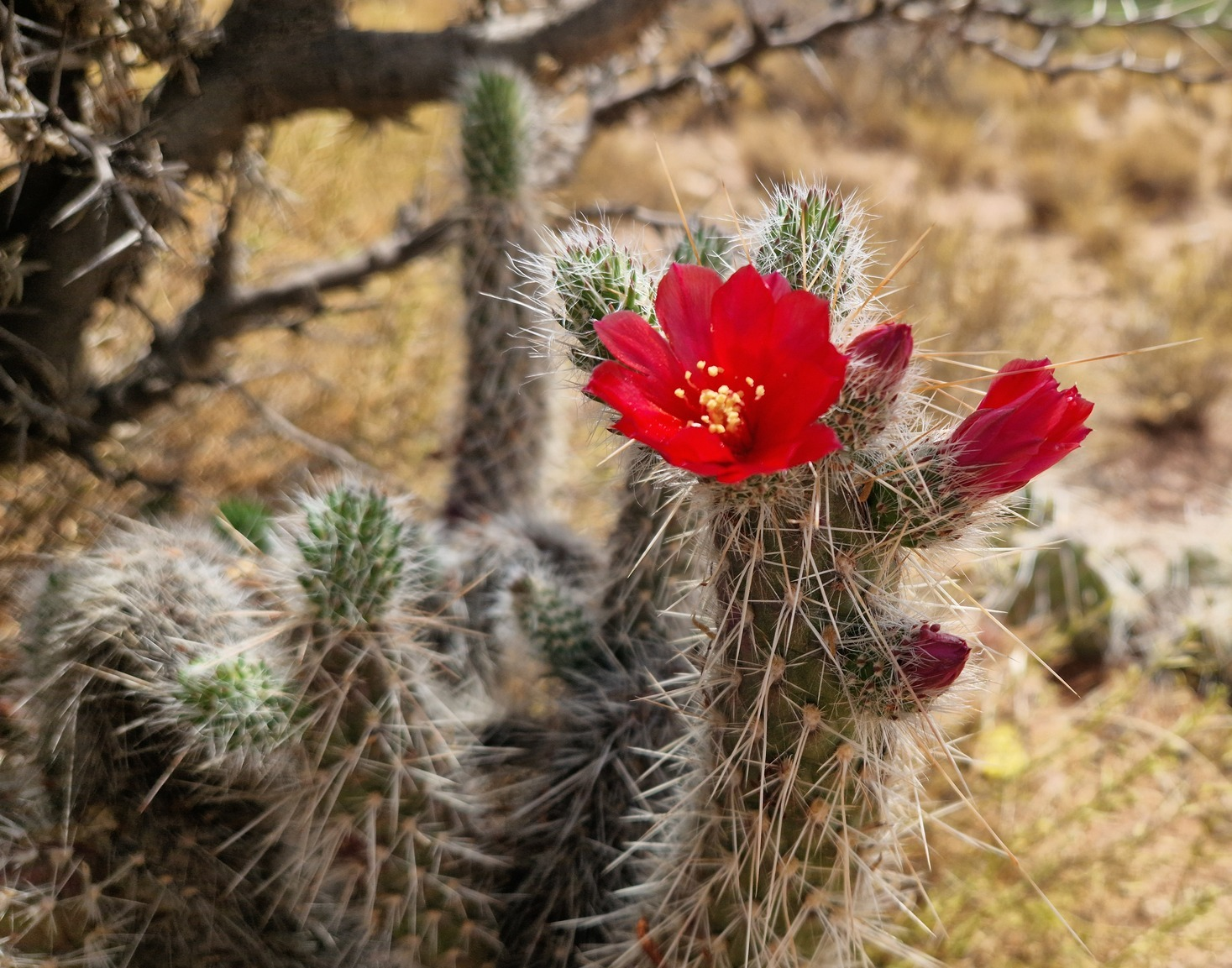
Plant in flower

The flowers are bright red in color and measure 3 cm in length. The pericarpel, which is pear-shaped, is covered in trichomes and does not have spines. The fruits are spherical in shape and bright red in color; they are covered in glochids and trichomes. They can grow to 1.5 cm in length.

== Distribution and habitat ==
This species is found from western Bolivia to northwestern Argentina. It grows primarily in desert and dry shrubland biomes, at altitudes between 2500 and 3500 meters above sea level. It has been introduced to the Canary Islands and Morocco.

== Taxonomy ==
Austrocylindropuntia shaferi was first described as Opuntia shaferi, a name published in 1919 by the American botanists Nathaniel Lord Britton and Joseph Nelson Rose in their book The Cactaceae; descriptions and illustrations of plants of the cactus family 1: 72.

Later, the German botanist Curt Backeberg transferred the species to the genus Austrocylindropuntia, renaming it Austrocylindropuntia shaferi. He registered these changes in the scientific journal Cactus and Succulent Journal 23: 14, published in 1951.

=== Etymology ===
- Austrocylindropuntia: the genus name is derived from the Latin terms auster, -tralis; (meaning "southern"), the Greek term κύλινδρος (kýlindros); (meaning "cylinder"), and the genus Opuntia, (or, as a combination of the latter two terms, the genus Cylindropuntia); this references the cylindrical shape of the stems that appear similar to the genera Opuntia and Cylindropuntia.
- shaferi: the specific epithet honors the American botanist John Adolph Shafer (1863–1918).

=== Synonyms ===
- Austrocylindropuntia humahuacana (Backeb.) Backeb., 1951
- Austrocylindropuntia shaferi var. humahuacana (Backeb.) R.Kiesling, 1980
- Austrocylindropuntia steiniana Backeb, publicación de 1956, 1957
- Austrocylindropuntia vestita var. shaferi (Britton & Rose) F.Ritter, 1980
- Austrocylindropuntia weingartiana (Backeb.) Backeb., 1951
- Cylindropuntia humahuacana Backeb., 1936
- Cylindropuntia shaferi (Britton & Rose) Backeb, 1936
- Cylindropuntia weingartiana (Backeb.) Backeb., 1936
- Opuntia humahuacana (Backeb.) G.D.Rowley, 1958
- Opuntia ignescens var. steiniana (Backeb.) G.D.Rowley, 1958
- Opuntia shaferi Britton & Rose, 1919 (basónimo)
- Opuntia shaferi var. humahuacana (Backeb.) G.D.Rowley, 1982
- Opuntia steiniana (Backeb.) G.D.Rowley, 1958
- Opuntia weingartiana Backeb., 1935
- Trichopuntia shaferi (Britton & Rose) Guiggi, 2011
- Trichopuntia shaferi subsp. humahuacana (Backeb.) Guiggi, 2011

== Conservation status ==
On the IUCN Red List, Austrocylindropuntia shaferi is classified as being of Least Concern (LC).

== Cultivation ==
This species is cultivated primarily as an ornamental. It may be propagated vegetatively via cuttings, or via seed.

== Gallery ==
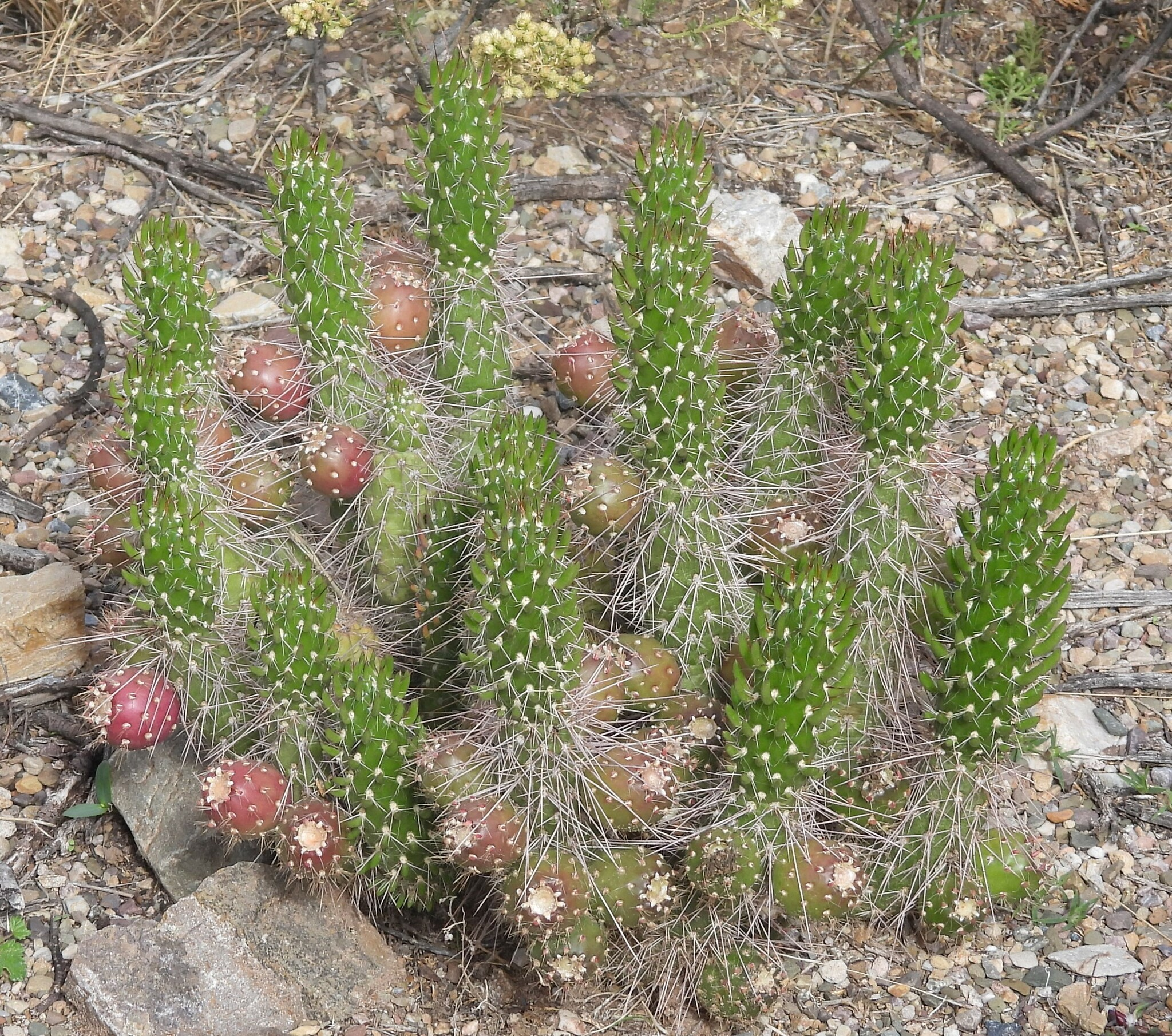
Plant with fruits

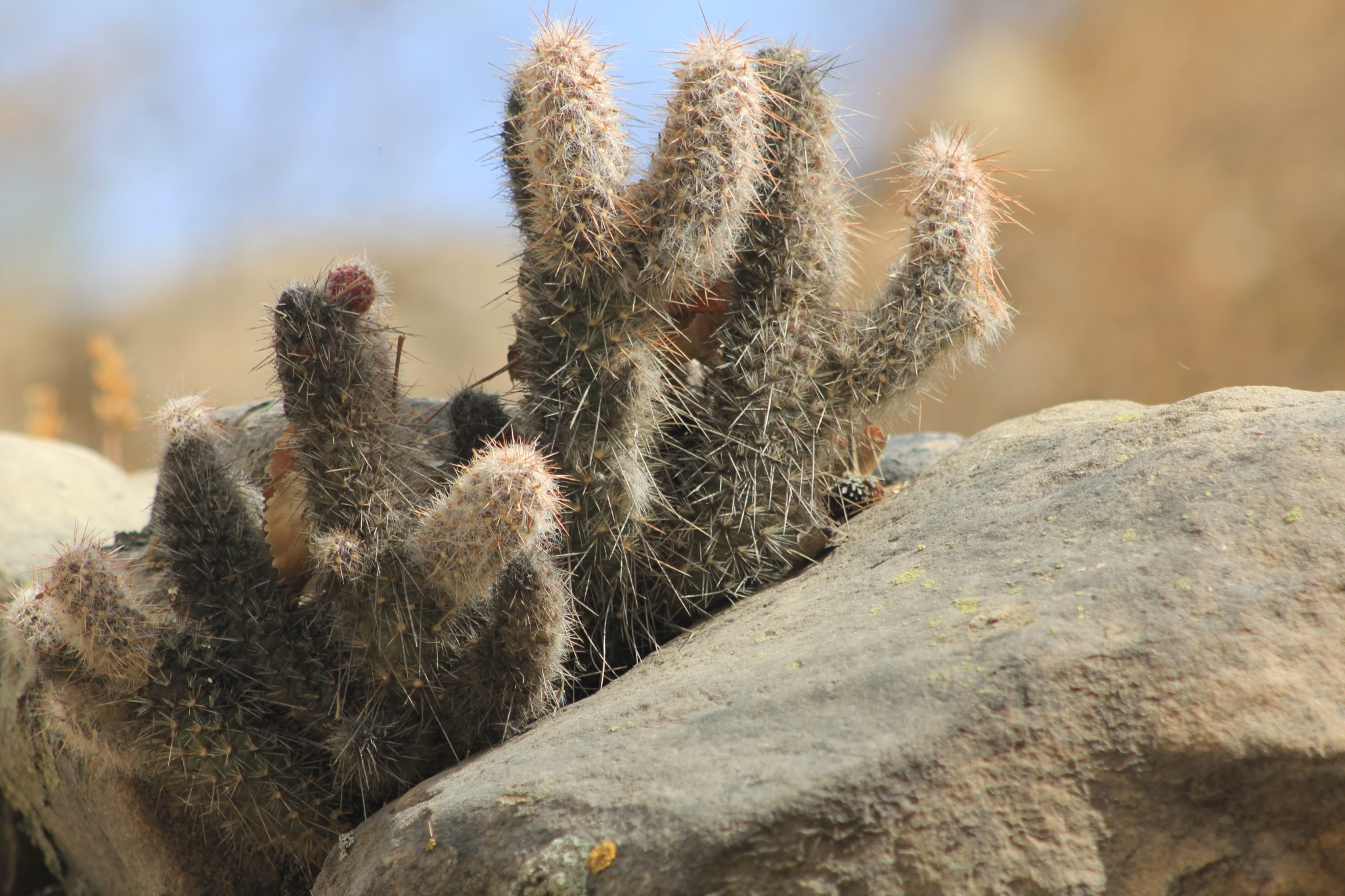
Plant growing between rocks

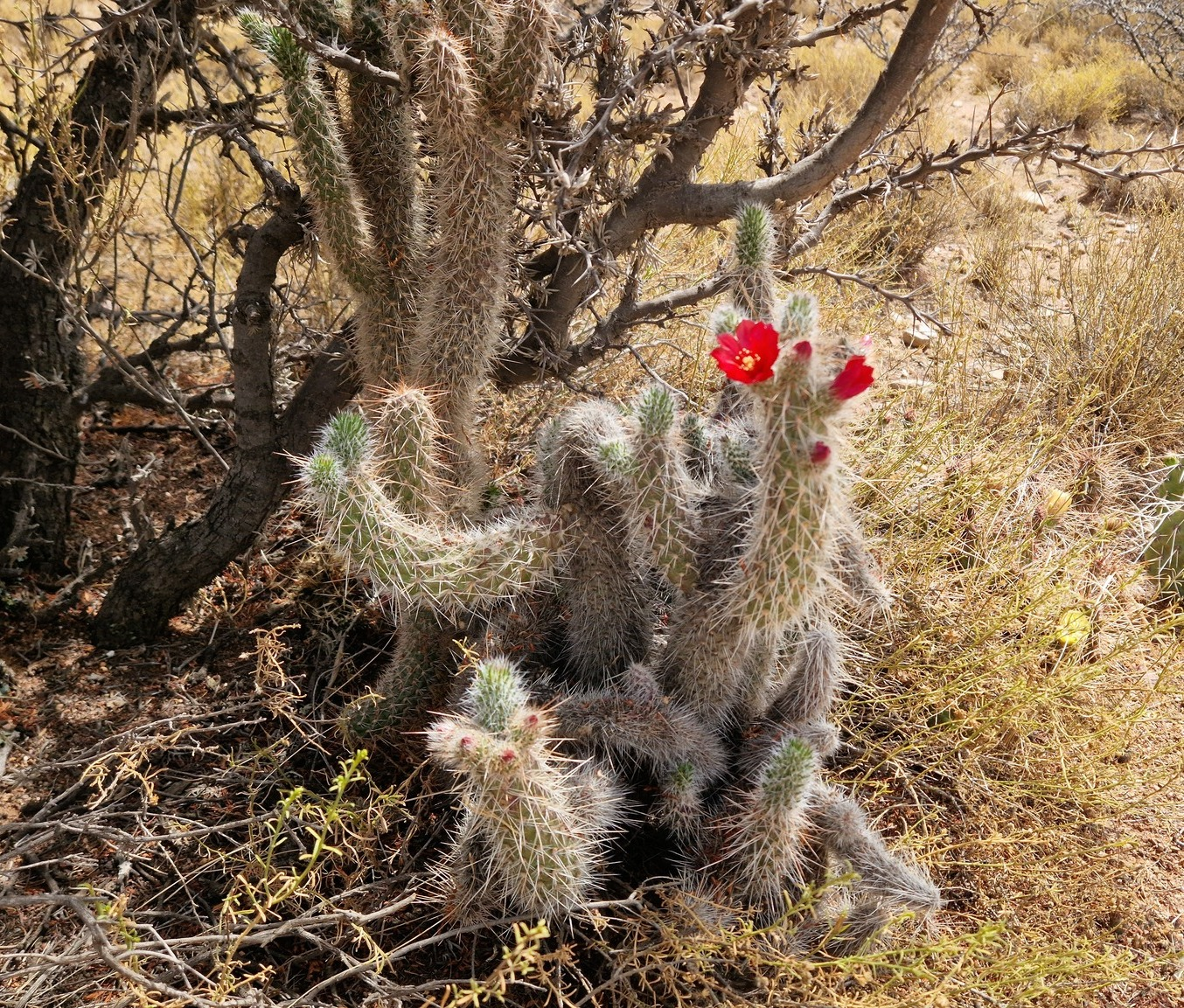
Plant in flower

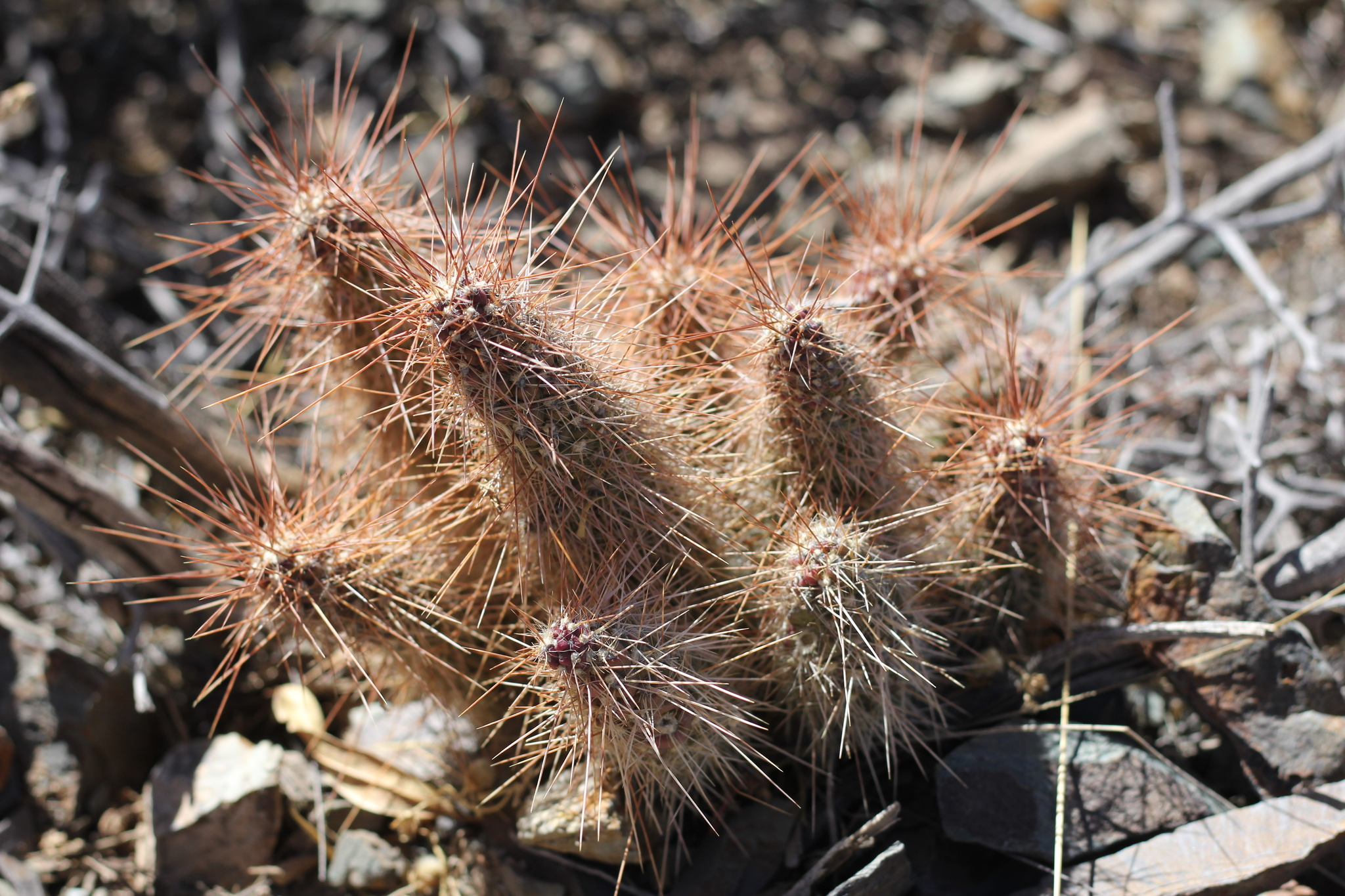
Plant size

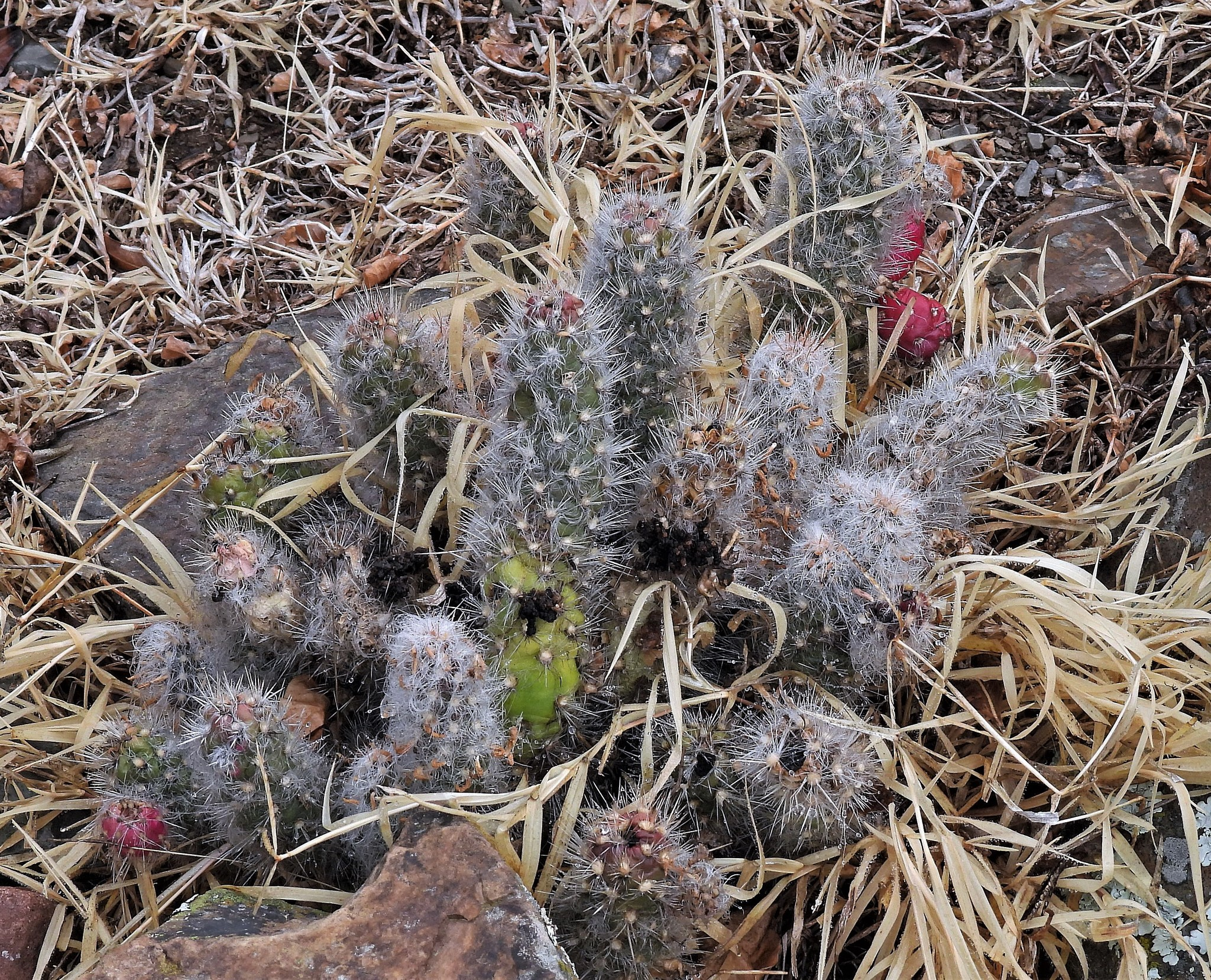
In habitat in Valle Grande, Jujuy, Argentina
