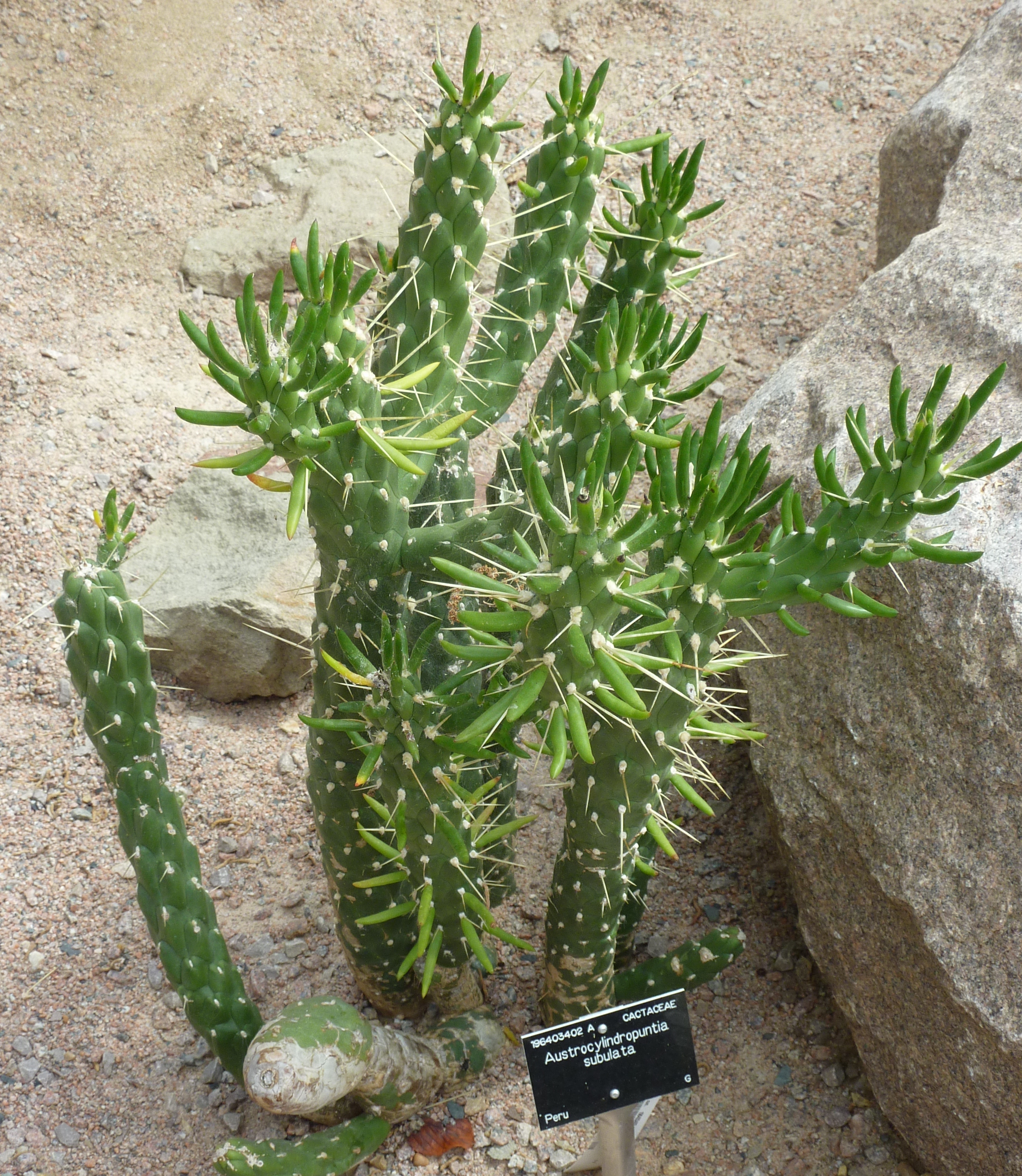
- Young plant

Conservation status
- Least Concern (IUCN 3.1)

Scientific classification
- Kingdom: Plantae
- Clade: Tracheophytes
- Clade: Angiosperms
- Clade: Eudicots
- Order: Caryophyllales
- Family: Cactaceae
- Genus: Austrocylindropuntia
- Species: A. subulata

Binomial name
- Austrocylindropuntia subulata (Muehlenpf.) Backeb.

Synonyms
- Cylindropuntia exaltata (A.Berger) Backeb.; Cylindropuntia subulata (Muehlenpf.) F.M.Knuth; Opuntia ellemeetiana Miq.; Opuntia exaltata A. Berger; Opuntia segethii F. Phil.; Opuntia subulata (Muehlenpf.) Engelm.; Pereskia subulata Muehlenpf.

= Austrocylindropuntia subulata =

Andean cactus, invasive elsewhere

Austrocylindropuntia subulata is a species of cactus native to the Peruvian Andes. The Latin specific epithet subulata means "awl-like", referring to the shape of the rudimentary leaves. It is also known by its common names as Eve's pin and Eve's needle.

== Description ==
Austrocylindropuntia subulata can reach heights up to 4 metres (13 ft), with numerous branches. The elongated, slightly brittle branches are up to 50 centimetres (20 in) long. The stems are marked by rhomboid to ovate bumps in a few spiral rows. At the tip of each bump is the areole, from which grow one to four straight, grayish-white spines up to 8 centimetres (3 in) long. The awl-like rudimentary leaves are up to 12 centimetres (5 in) long.

The orangy-pink flowers are up to 6 centimetres (2 1/4 in) long. The long, warty hypanthium is covered by rudimentary leaves up to 2 centimetres (3/4 in) long. The fruit are ovoid or club-like and sometimes thorny. They are up to 10 centimetres (4 in) long.

== Distribution ==
A. subulata probably comes from the Peruvian Andes, where it is common at altitudes above 3,000 metres (9,800 feet). Today it has been naturalised in Argentina and Bolivia. It has been introduced in the Mediterranean basin to form impassable hedges, but it has become invasive in coastal provinces and some in the Iberian interior. It is also invasive in Australia, and is a declared Weed of National Significance.

== Classification ==
The first description as Pereskia subulata took place in 1845 by Friedrich Mühlenpfordt. Curt Backeberg classified it in the genus Austrocylindropuntia in 1942.

== Image gallery ==
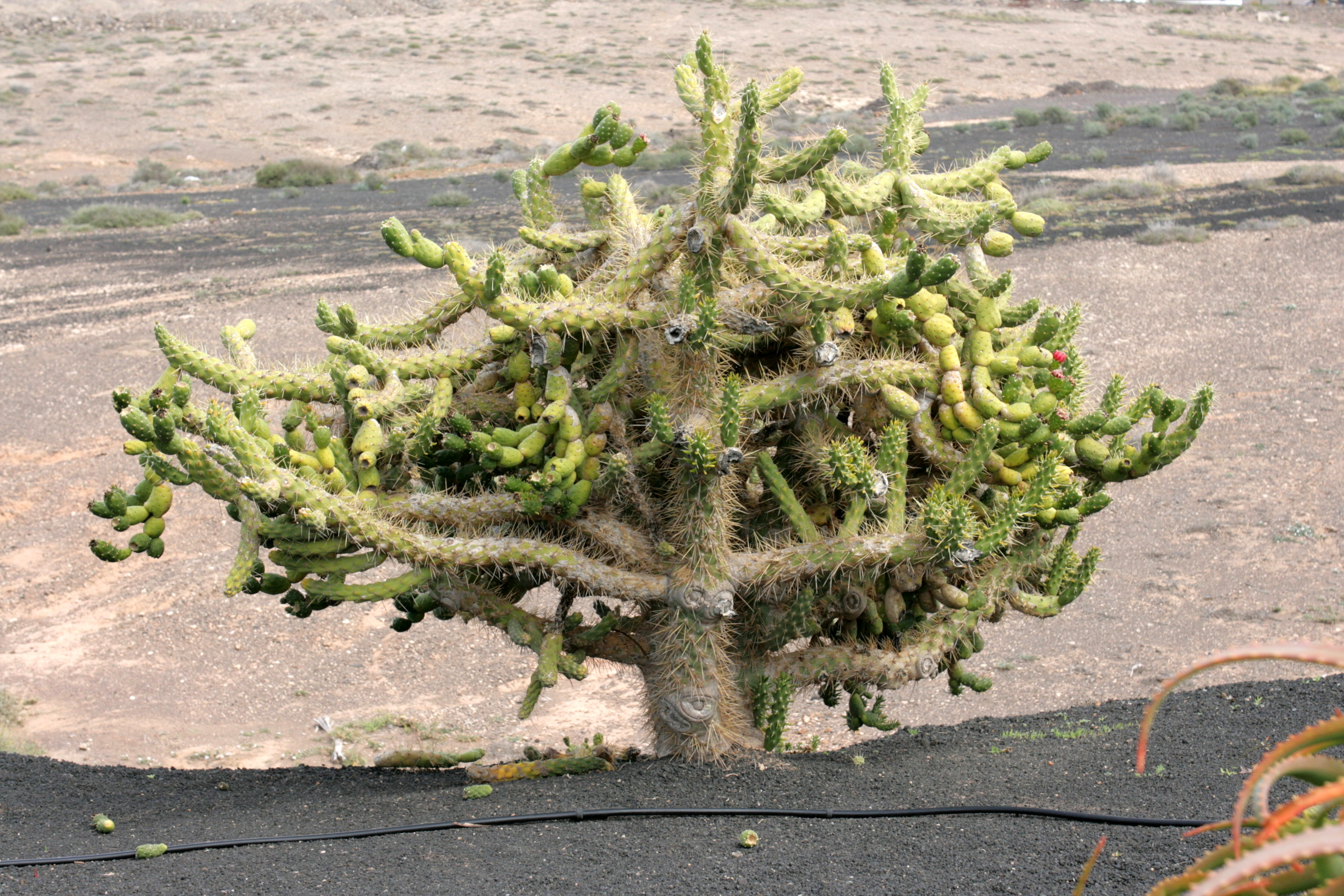

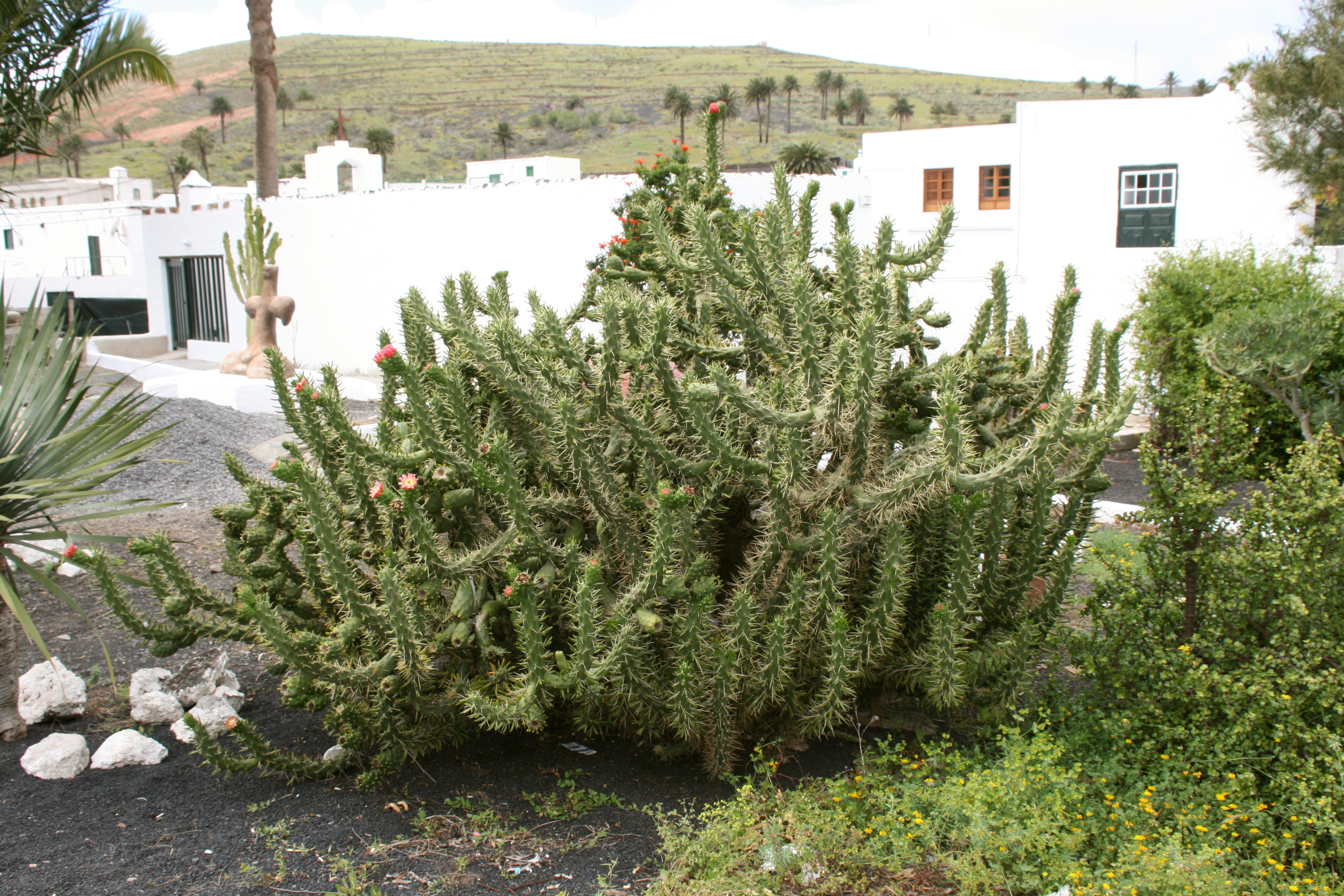

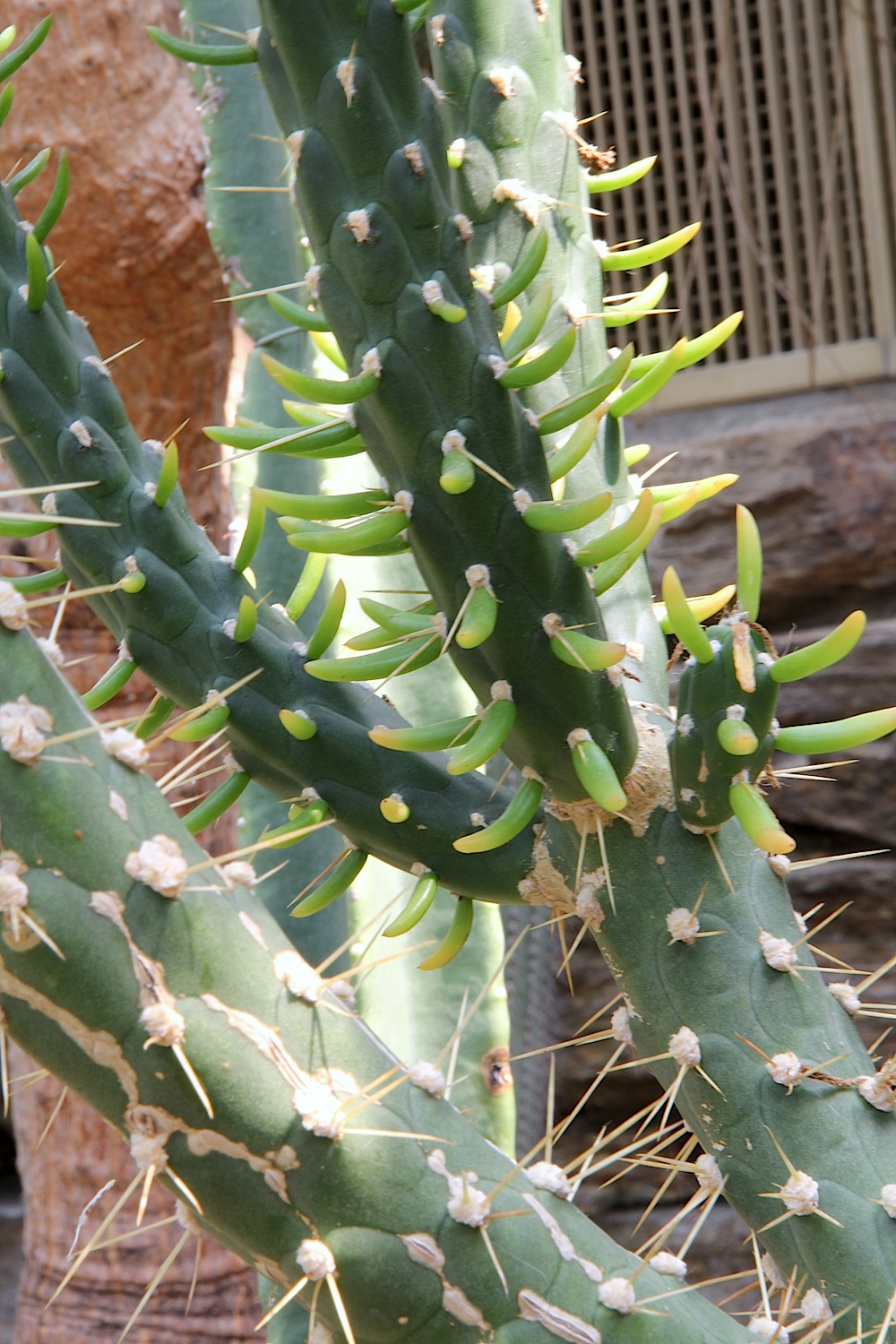

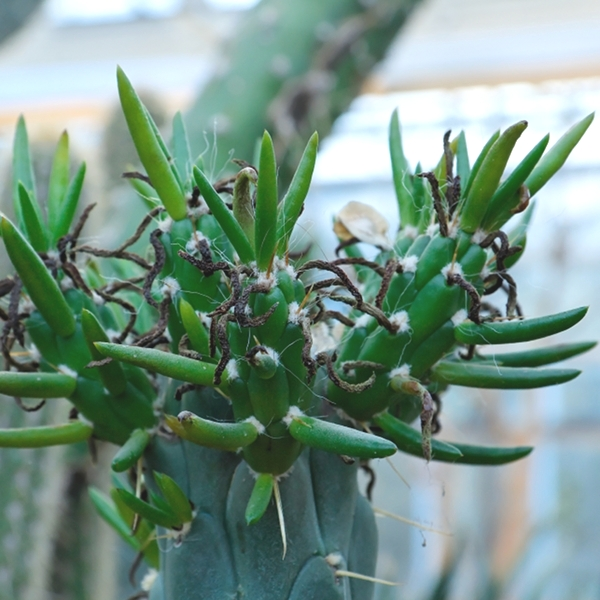

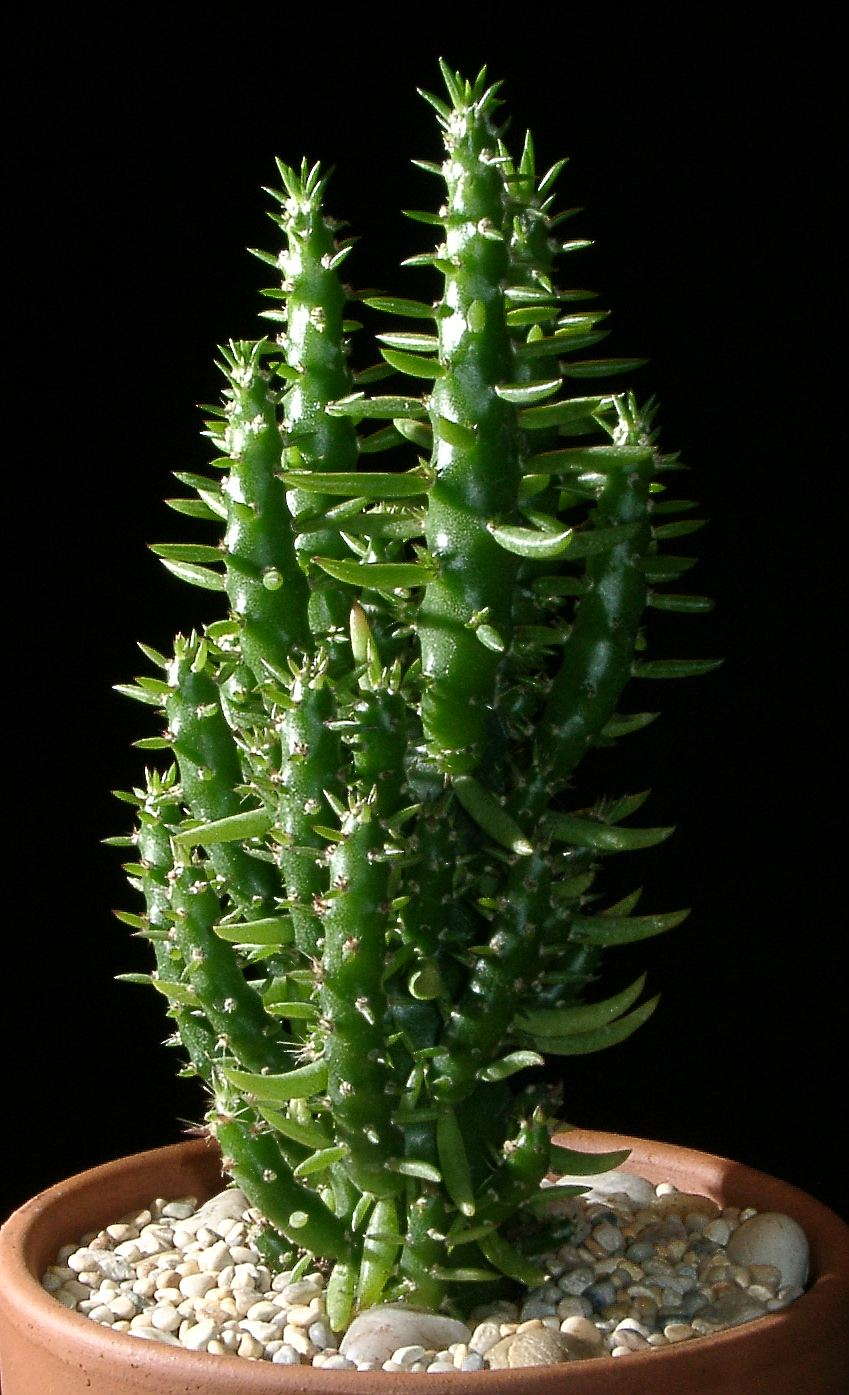

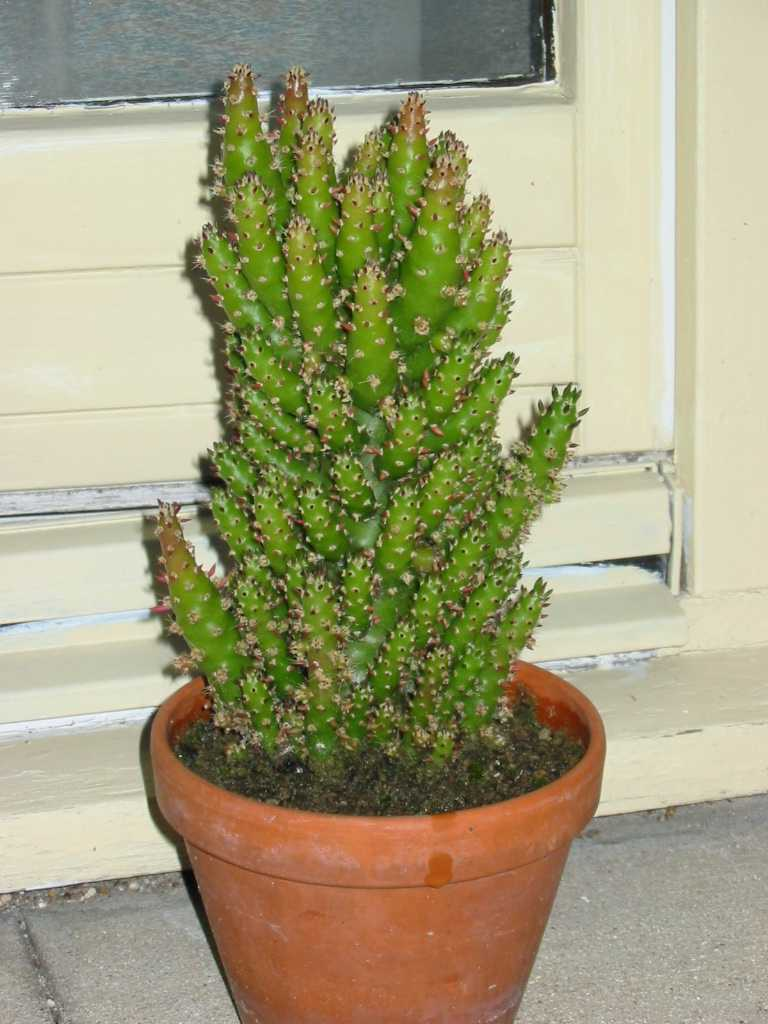

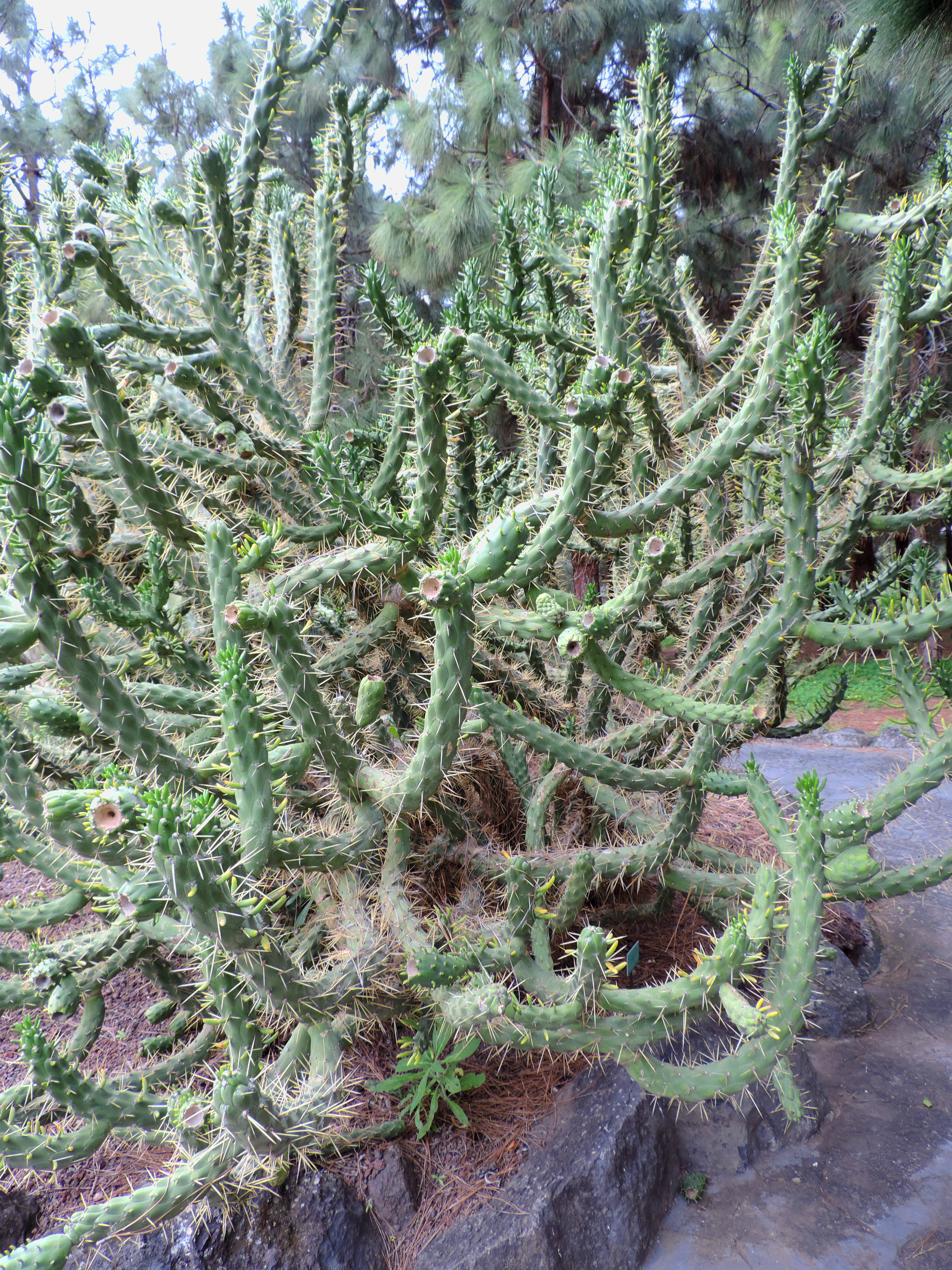

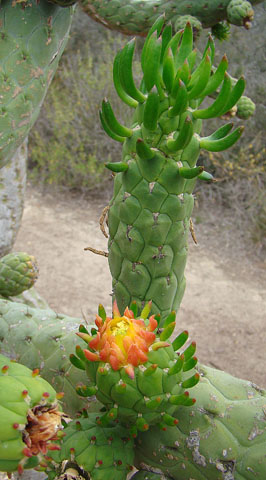

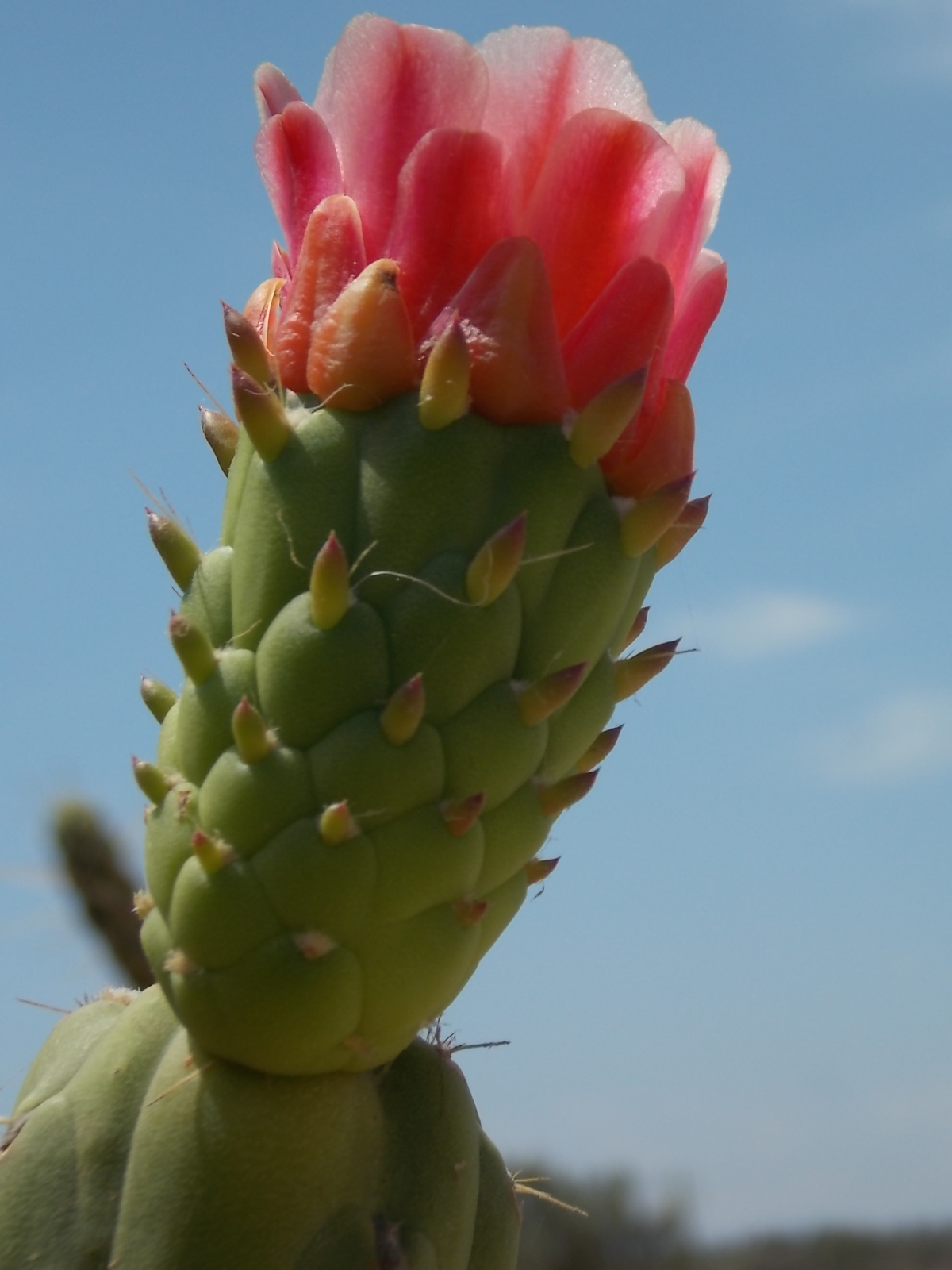

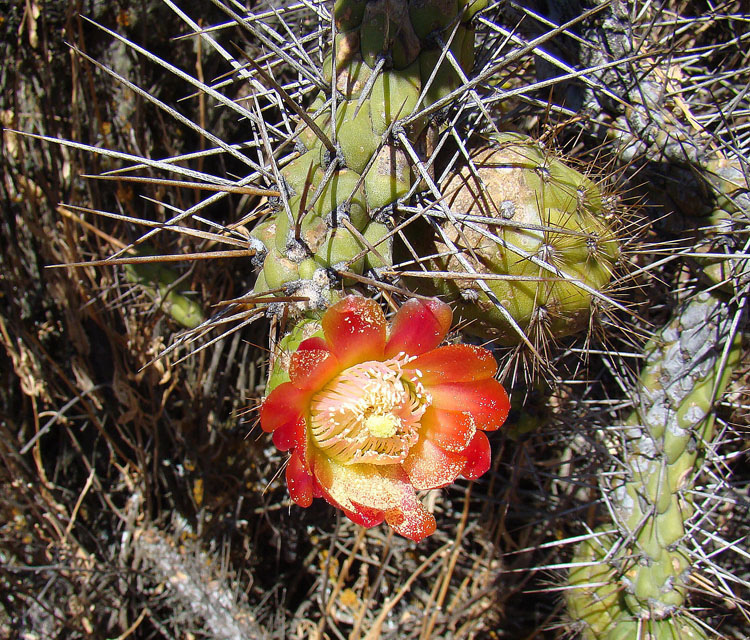
