= C10H12N2 =

The molecular formula C_{10}H_{12}N_{2} (molar mass: 160.22 g/mol) may refer to:

- Anabaseine
- Anatabine
- Echinopsidine
- Isotryptamine
- Tolazoline
- Tryptamine
