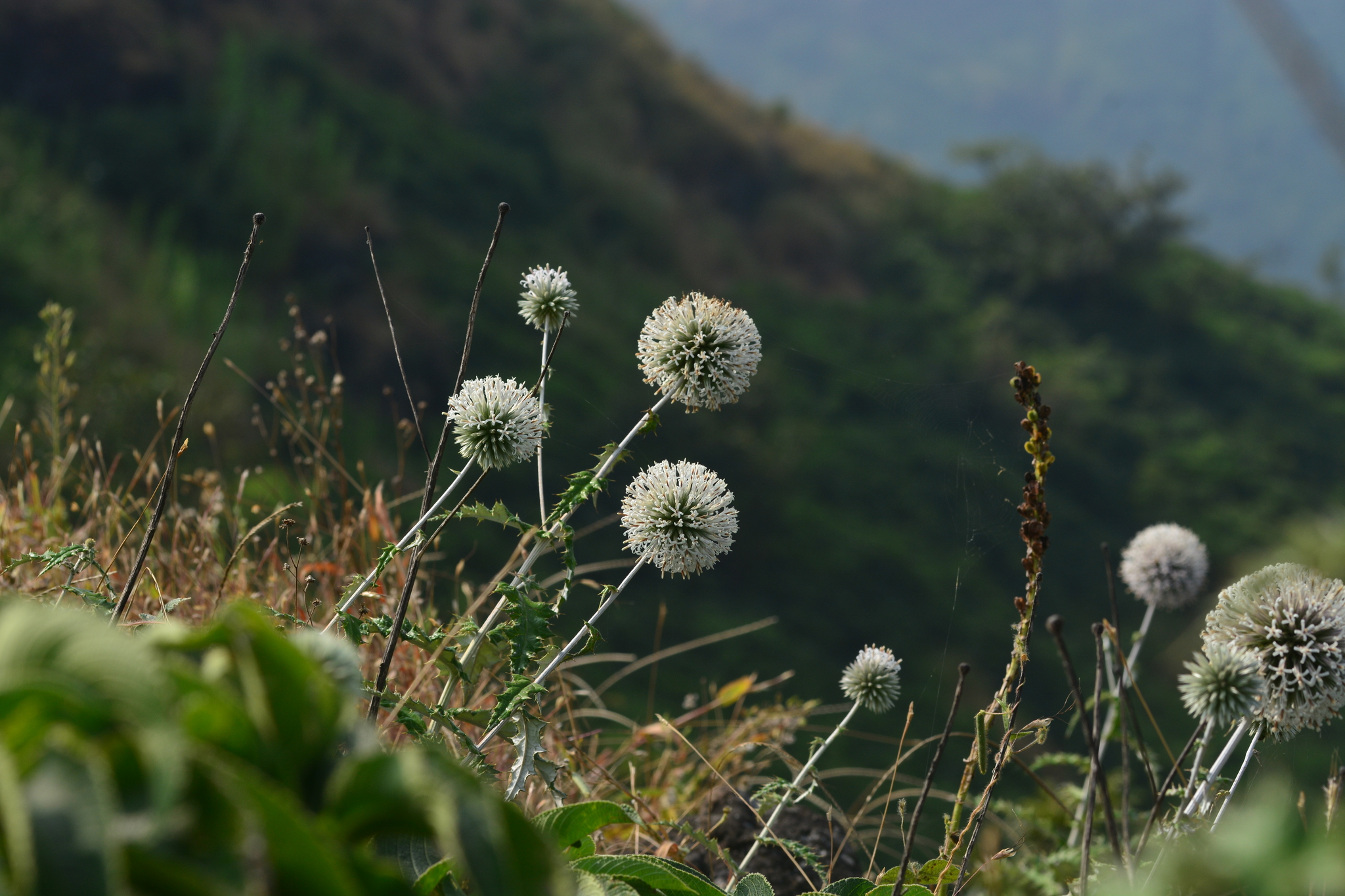

Scientific classification
- Kingdom: Plantae
- Clade: Tracheophytes
- Clade: Angiosperms
- Clade: Eudicots
- Clade: Asterids
- Order: Asterales
- Family: Asteraceae
- Genus: Echinops
- Species: E. sahyadricus

Binomial name
- Echinops sahyadricus S.More, F.Conti & H.S.Bhosale

= Echinops sahyadricus =

Species of flowering plant

Echinops sahyadricus, the Sahyadri globe thistle, is a species of flowering plant. It is a medium sized forb belong to the tribe Cardueae in the family Asteraceae. E. sahyadricus was discovered by a Mumbai University student at the Rajgad Fort, and it was formally described in 2020.

== Description ==
The species is morphologically similar to Echinops echinatus, but E. sahyadricus has a larger inflorescence and leaves with less hair. The species is perennial and spiny, growing up to 180 cm tall. Flowers are white, and blooms from November to December. Fruit is an achene that matures in January.

== Range ==
Echinops sahyadricus is distributed in the northern Sahyadri Mountains from Nashik District, Pune District, and Satara District. The specific epithet sahyadricus is named for the mountain range where it is endemic.

== Ecology ==
The species is found on open mountain slopes from 800 to 1400 meters, and it occupies an area of approximately 40 square kilometers. Apis dorsata has been observed pollinating the species.
