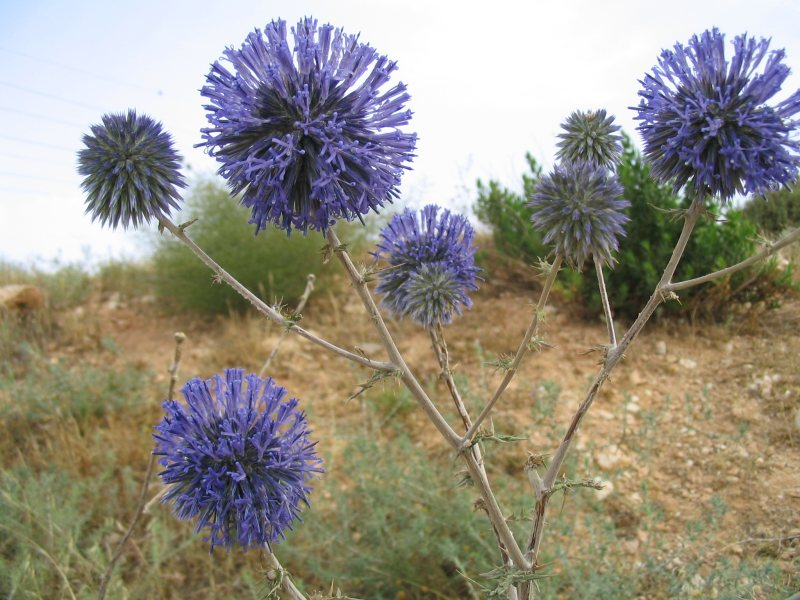
- Echinops adenocaulos inflorescence

Scientific classification
- Kingdom: Plantae
- Clade: Embryophytes
- Clade: Tracheophytes
- Clade: Spermatophytes
- Clade: Angiosperms
- Clade: Eudicots
- Clade: Asterids
- Order: Asterales
- Family: Asteraceae
- Genus: Echinops
- Species: E. adenocaulos

Binomial name
- Echinops adenocaulos Boiss.

= Echinops adenocaulos =

Species of flowering plant

Echinops adenocaulos is a species of flowering plant in the family Asteraceae. It is native to the Middle Eastern countries of Israel, Palestine, Jordan, Syria, and Lebanon.
