= Echinops =

Scientific classification
- Kingdom: Plantae
- Clade: Tracheophytes
- Clade: Angiosperms
- Clade: Eudicots
- Clade: Asterids
- Order: Asterales
- Family: Asteraceae
- Subfamily: Carduoideae
- Tribe: Cardueae
- Subtribe: Echinopsinae; Dumort.
- Genus: Echinops; L.

Species
- About 130 species, see text

Genus of flowering plants

Echinops /ˈɛkɪnɒps/ is a genus of about 130 species of flowering plants in the family Asteraceae, commonly known as globe thistles. They have spiny foliage and produce blue or white spherical flower heads. They are distributed from central Asia, Mongolia and north-eastern China to the Mediterranean basin, temperate regions of Eurasia, reaching to Indian subcontinent and tropical Africa. Globe thistles are a common host plant for weevils of the genus Larinus.

== Characteristics ==
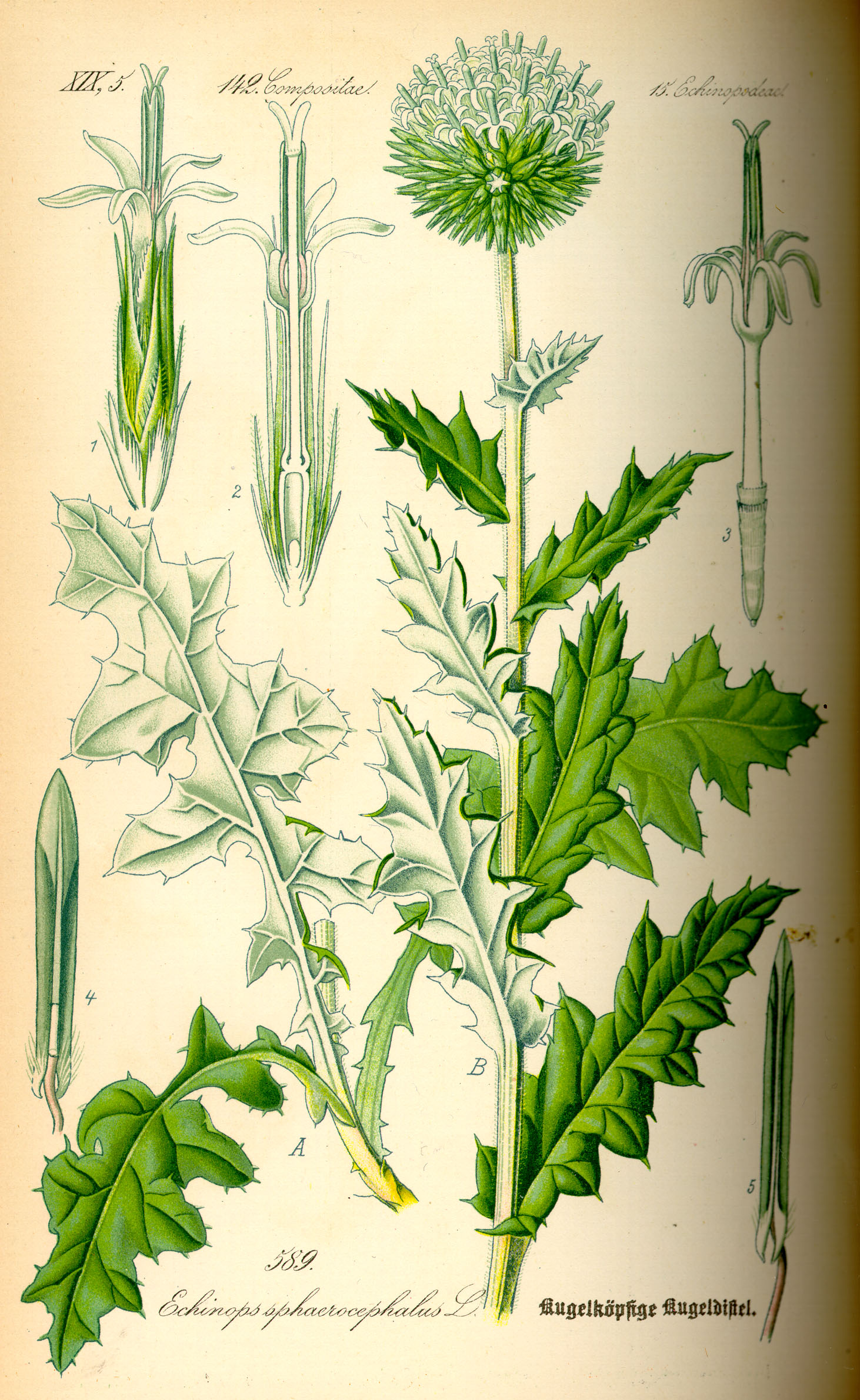
Illustration of globe thistle Echinops sphaerocephalus

=== Vegetative characteristics ===
The globe thistle species are perennial herbaceous plants. They form rhizomes as perennial organs. The independently upright stems are angular. The alternately arranged leaves are one to two-pinnately divided and white, woolly and tomentose on the underside.

=== Generative features ===
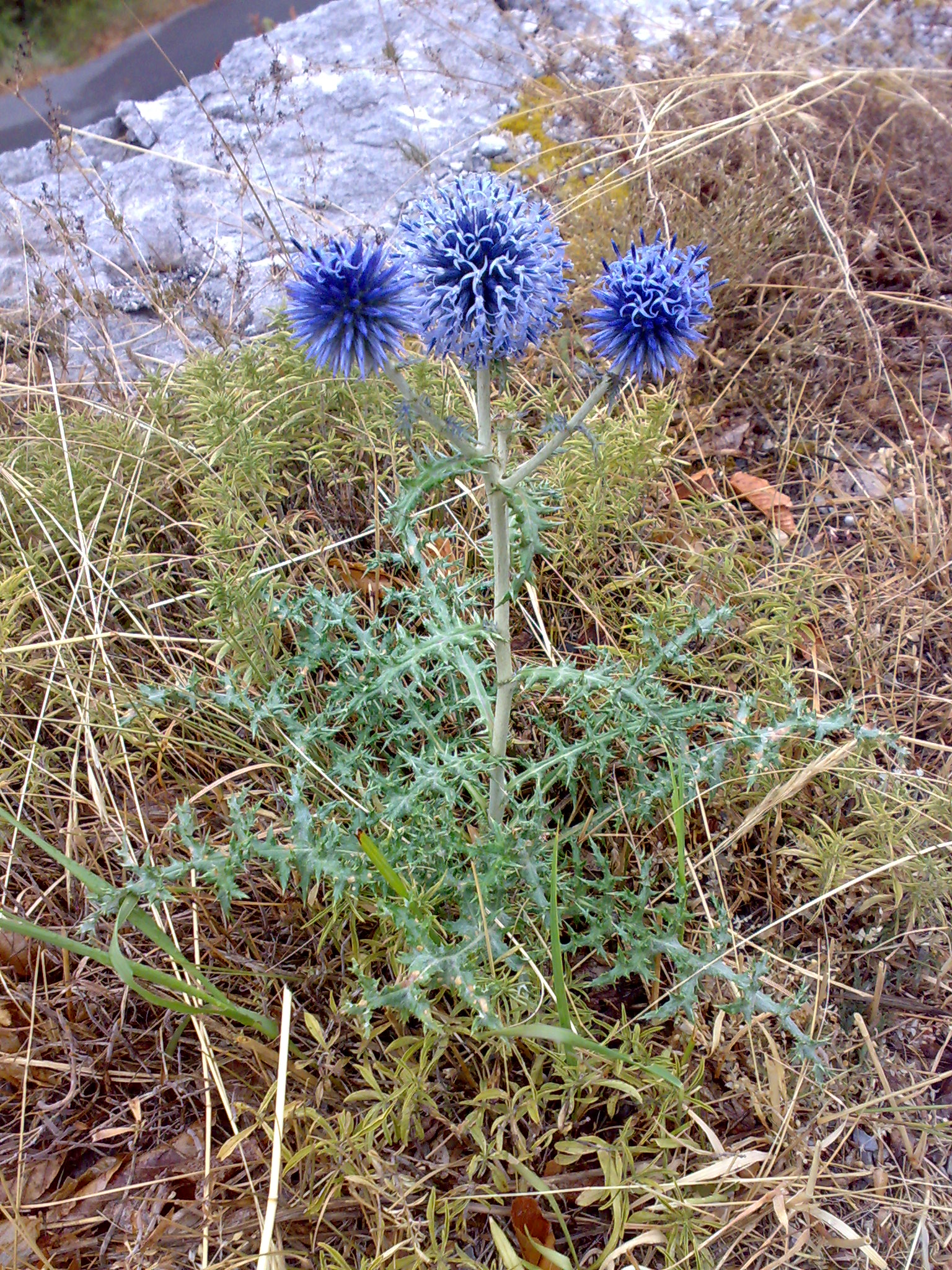
Echinops ritro

The capitulas are single-flowered, have a hermaphrodite tubular flower and are surrounded by a multi-rowed sheath. Numerous capitulas form spherical inflorescences of the second order, which have a diameter of 4 to 8 centimeters. The capitulas bloom from top to bottom within a head. The corolla is tubular, divided almost to the base. The flower color is steel blue to white, the inflorescences as a whole are usually bluish. The stamens are blue-gray. The achenes are cylindrical, pentagonal and hairy. The pappus has short scales.

== Human uses ==
Many species belonging to the genus Echinops are traditionally used as medicinal herbs in Africa, Asia and Europe. More than 151 natural products have been reported from this genus, many of which contain an unusual alkyne- and thiophene-containing structure. Various extracts, essential oils, and isolated compounds from members of this genus have been shown to have anti-microbial, cytotoxic, and anti-inflammatory effects in vitro. However, there are a number of species in this genus that are claimed to have traditional medicinal uses but their chemical composition has not yet been evaluated.

Echinoynethiophene A is one such compound

Echinops plants have been traditionally employed in folk medicine to treat inflammation, pain, fever, cough, and sore throat; as an aphrodisiac; to facilitate expulsion of a retained placenta postpartum; as an abortifacient; and in the management of uterine tumors and leucorrhoea.

== Selected species ==
Species include:

- Echinops adenocaulos
- Echinops amplexicaulis
- Echinops bannaticus
- Echinops cephalotes
- Echinops ceratophorus
- Echinops chantavicus
- Echinops echinatus
- Echinops exaltatus
- Echinops giganteus
- Echinops gmelinii
- Echinops graecus
- Echinops humilis
- Echinops kotschyi
- Echinops latifolius
- Echinops longisetus
- Echinops macrophyllus
- Echinops nivens
- Echinops niveus
- Echinops orientalis
- Echinops persepolitanus
- Echinops polyceras
- Echinops ritro (syn. Echinops ruthenicus)
- Echinops sahyadricus
- Echinops setifer
- Echinops sphaerocephalus
- Echinops spinosissimus
- Echinops tournefortii
- Echinops tschimganicus
- Echinops kazerunensis

== Gallery ==
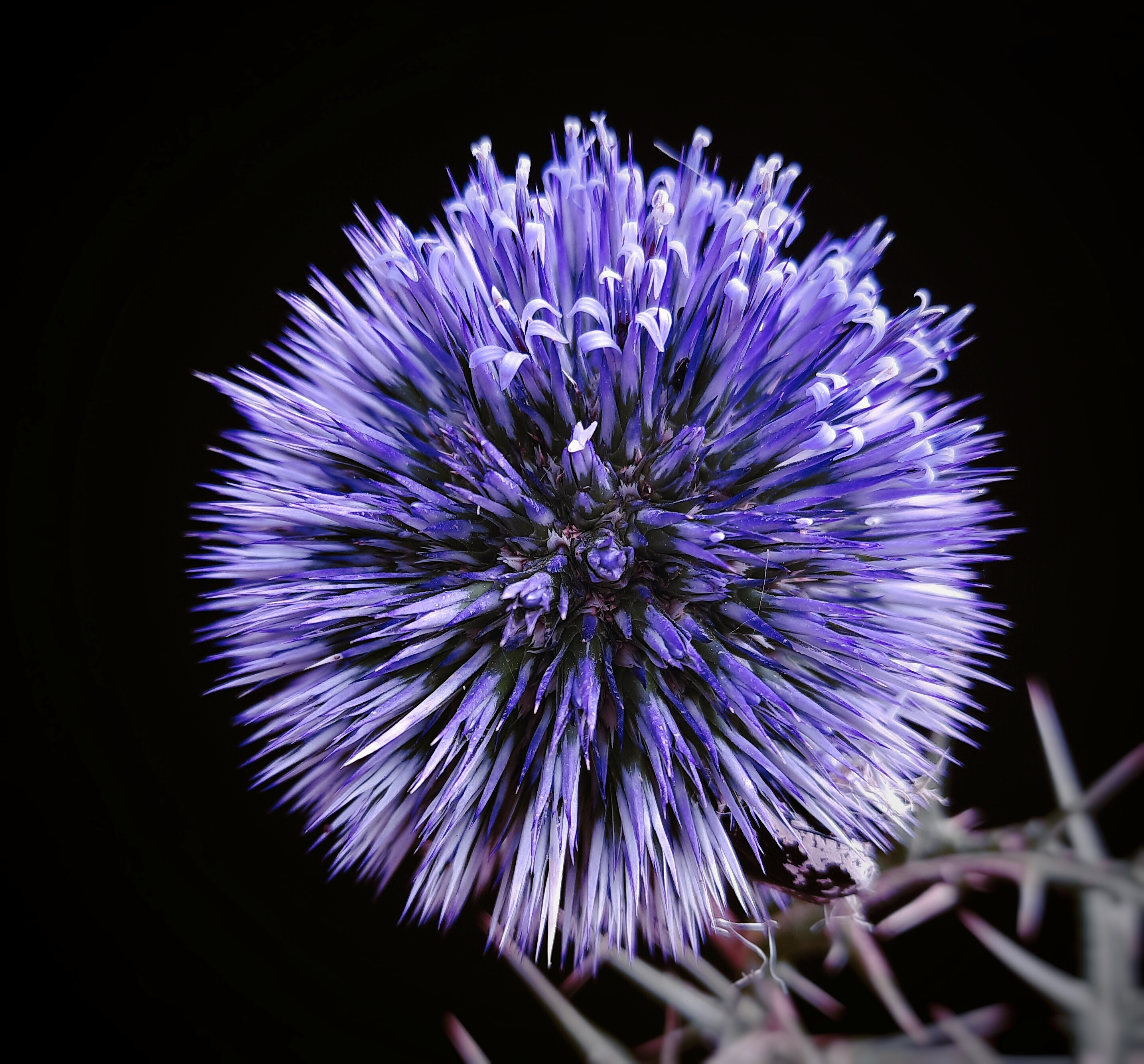
Echinops adenocaulos before flowering

The first flowers

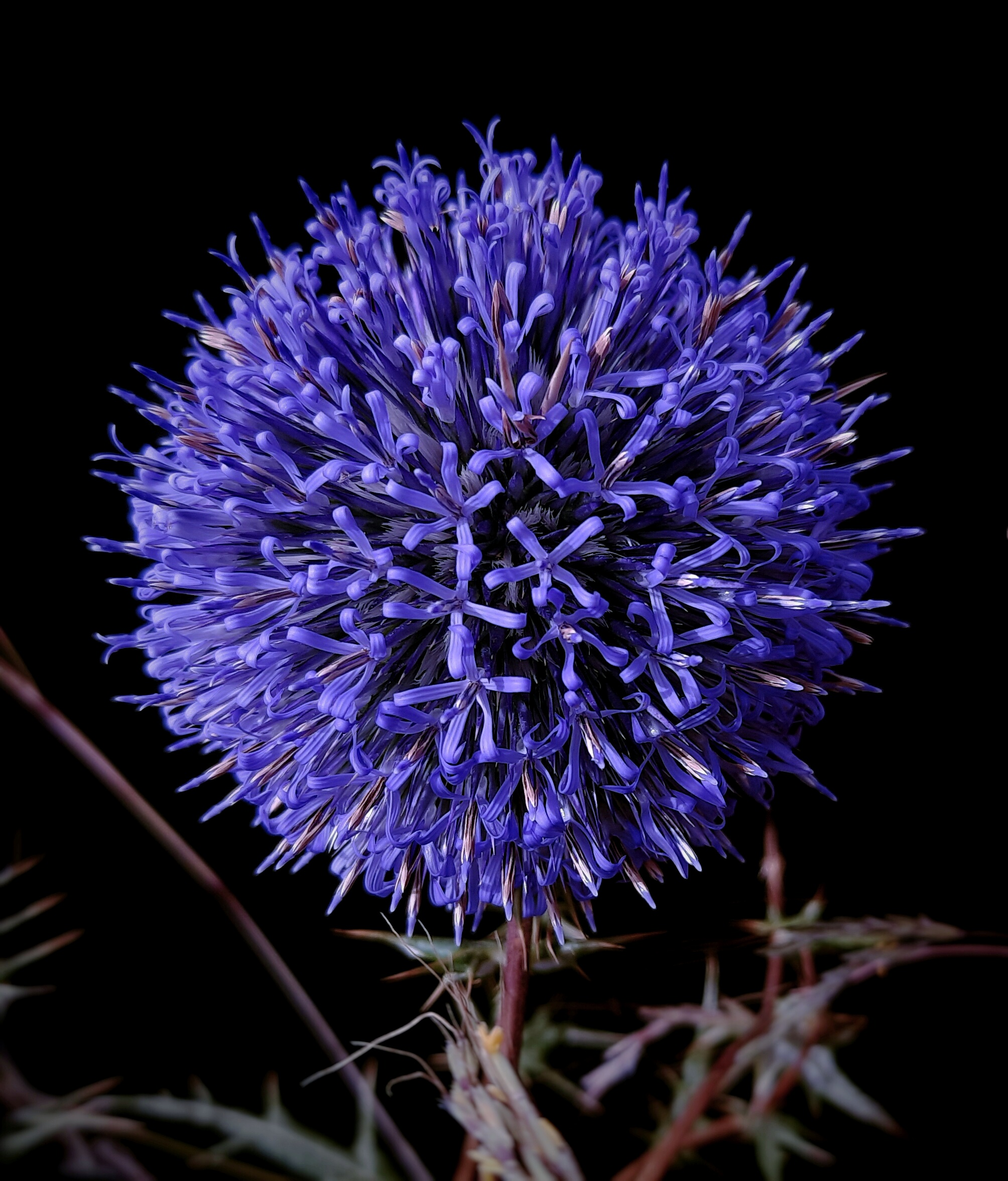
Echinops adenocaulos in north Africa

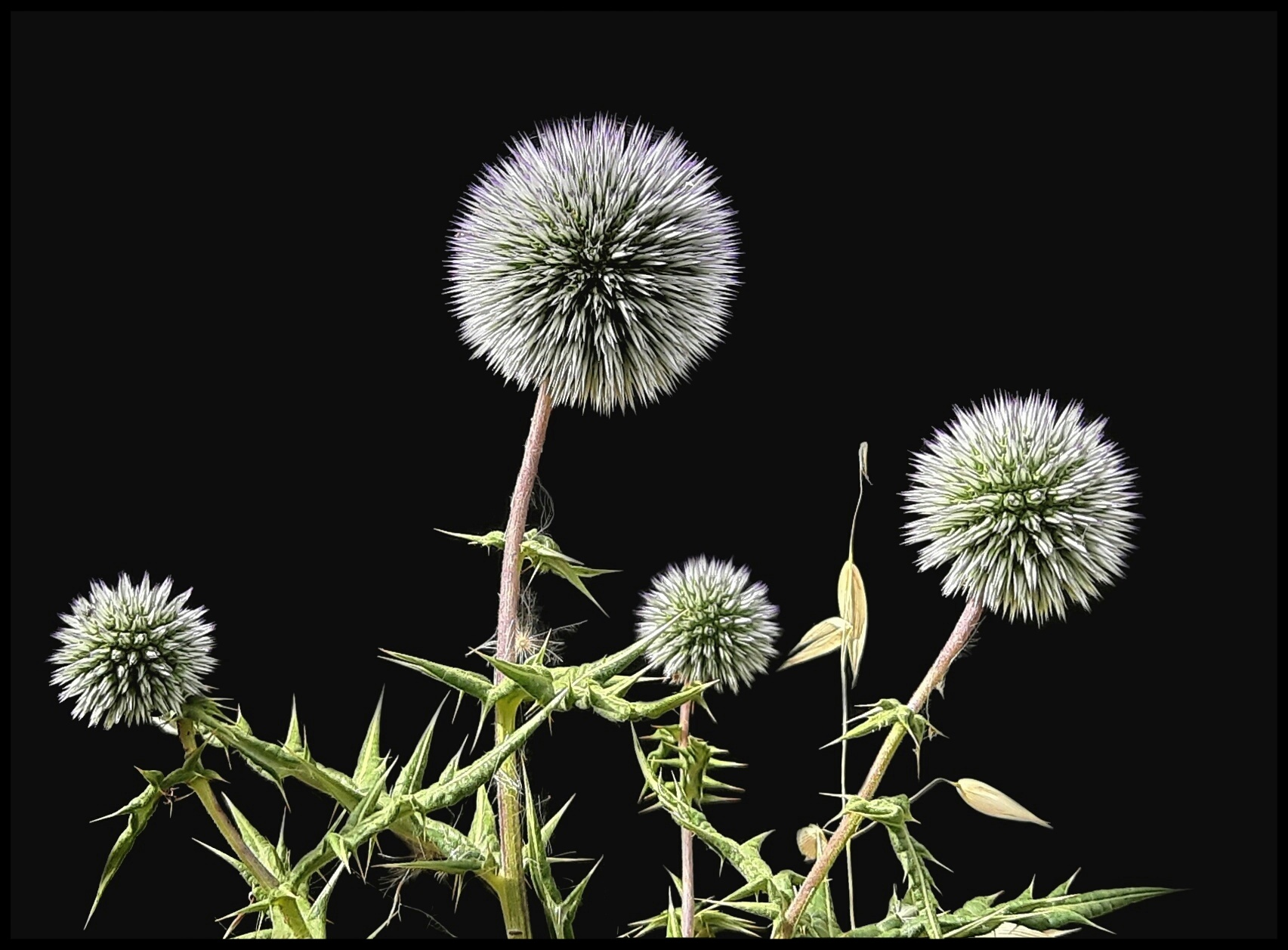
Echinops sphaerocephalus in Setif, Algeria

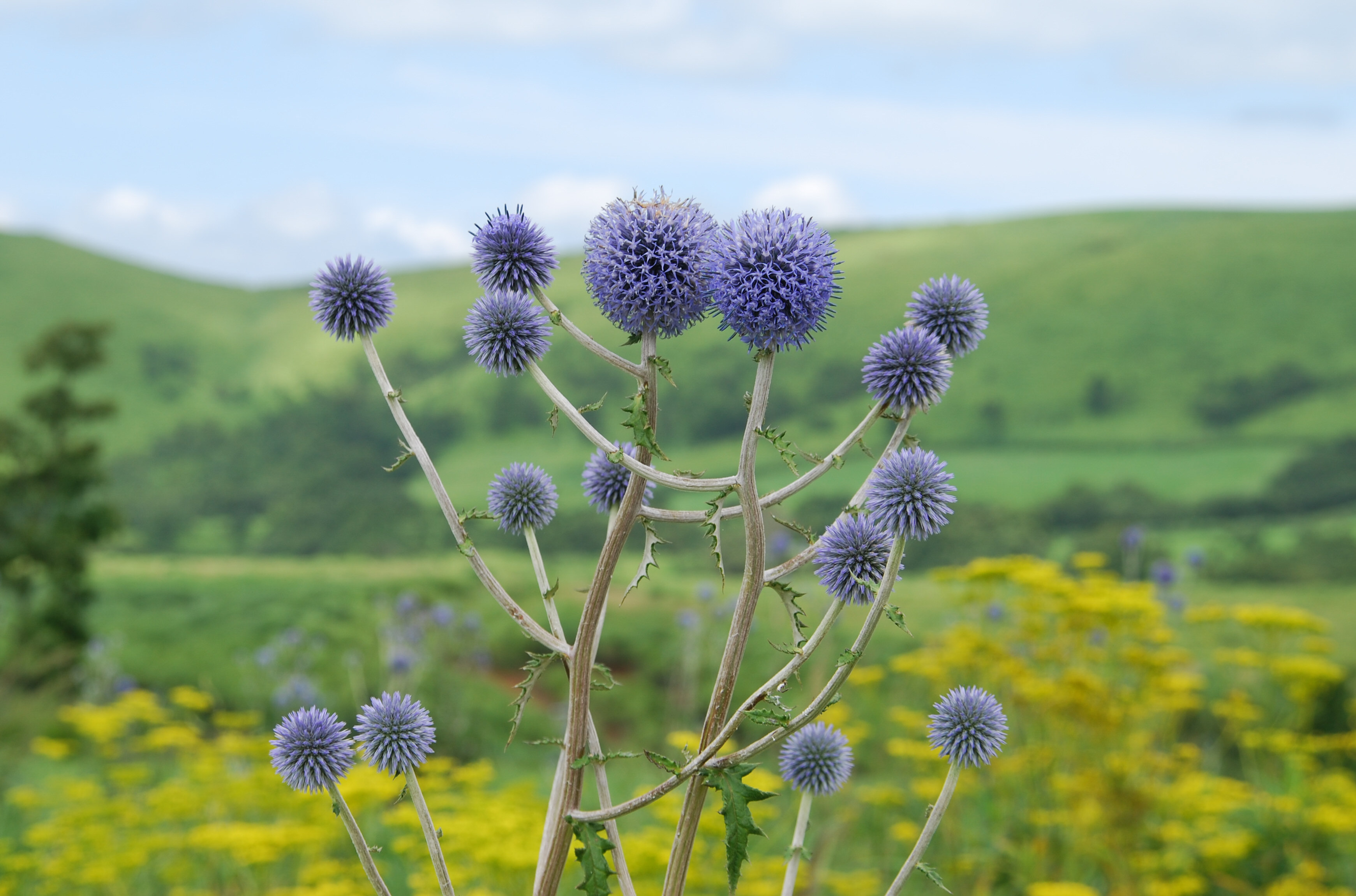
Echinops setifer in Japan

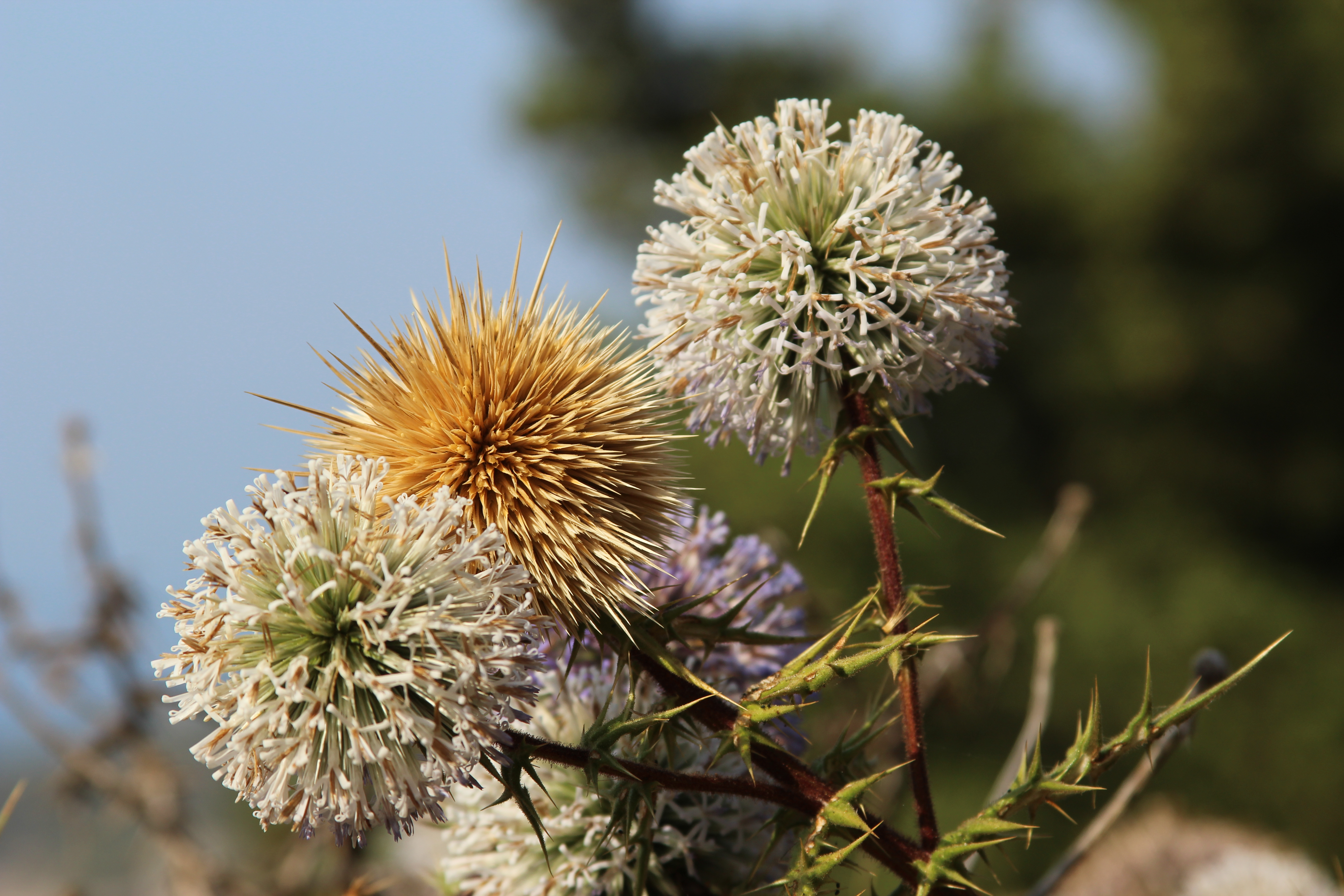
Echinops spinoissimus in Greece

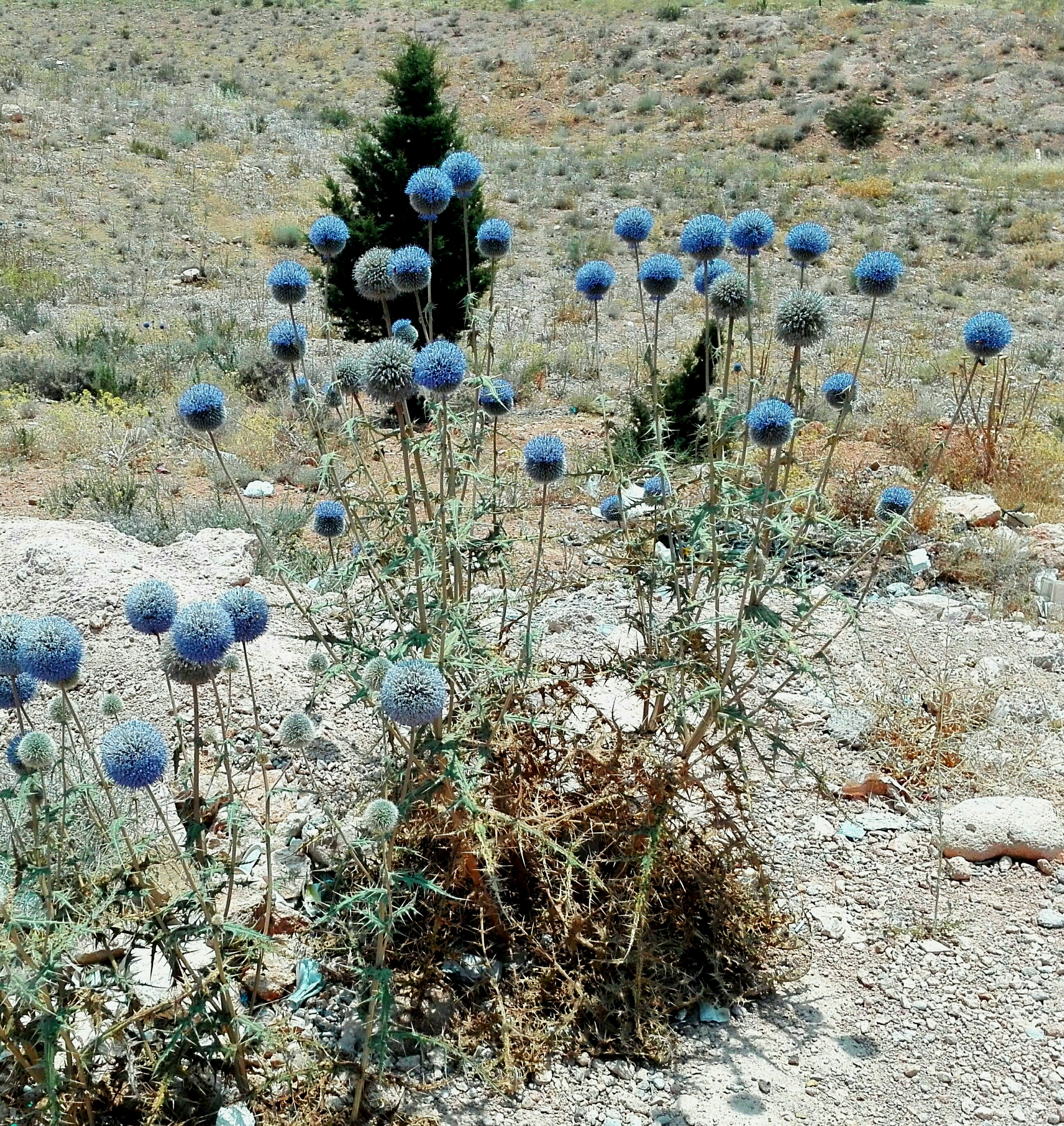
Echinops macrophyllus in Iran

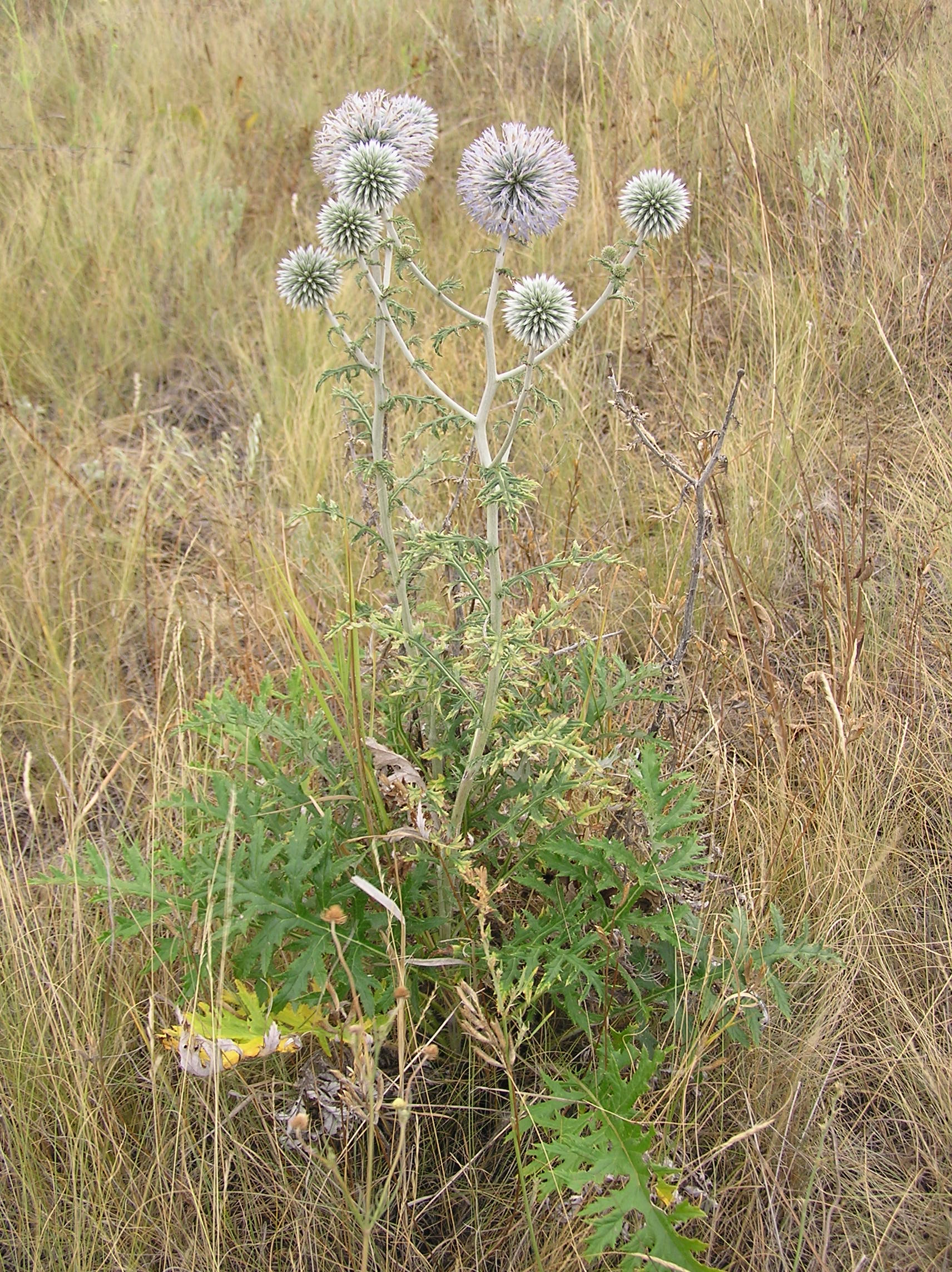
Echinops sphaerocephalus in Russia
