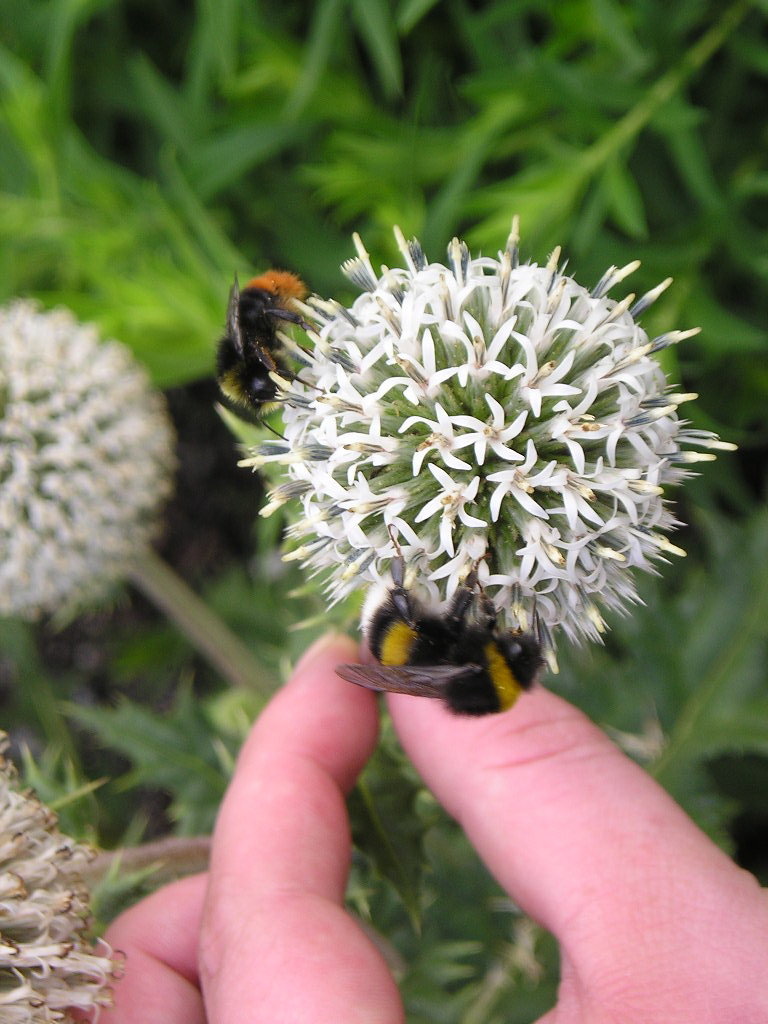

Scientific classification
- Kingdom: Plantae
- Clade: Tracheophytes
- Clade: Angiosperms
- Clade: Eudicots
- Clade: Asterids
- Order: Asterales
- Family: Asteraceae
- Genus: Echinops
- Species: E. niveus

Binomial name
- Echinops niveus Wall. ex DC.

= Echinops niveus =

Species of flowering plant

Echinops niveus is a species in the genus Echinops or globe thistles. It is native to the Indian subcontinent, in Himachal Pradesh, Jammu and Kashmir, Uttar Pradesh, and Nepal.

Nivetin is a neoflavonoid isolated from E. niveus.
