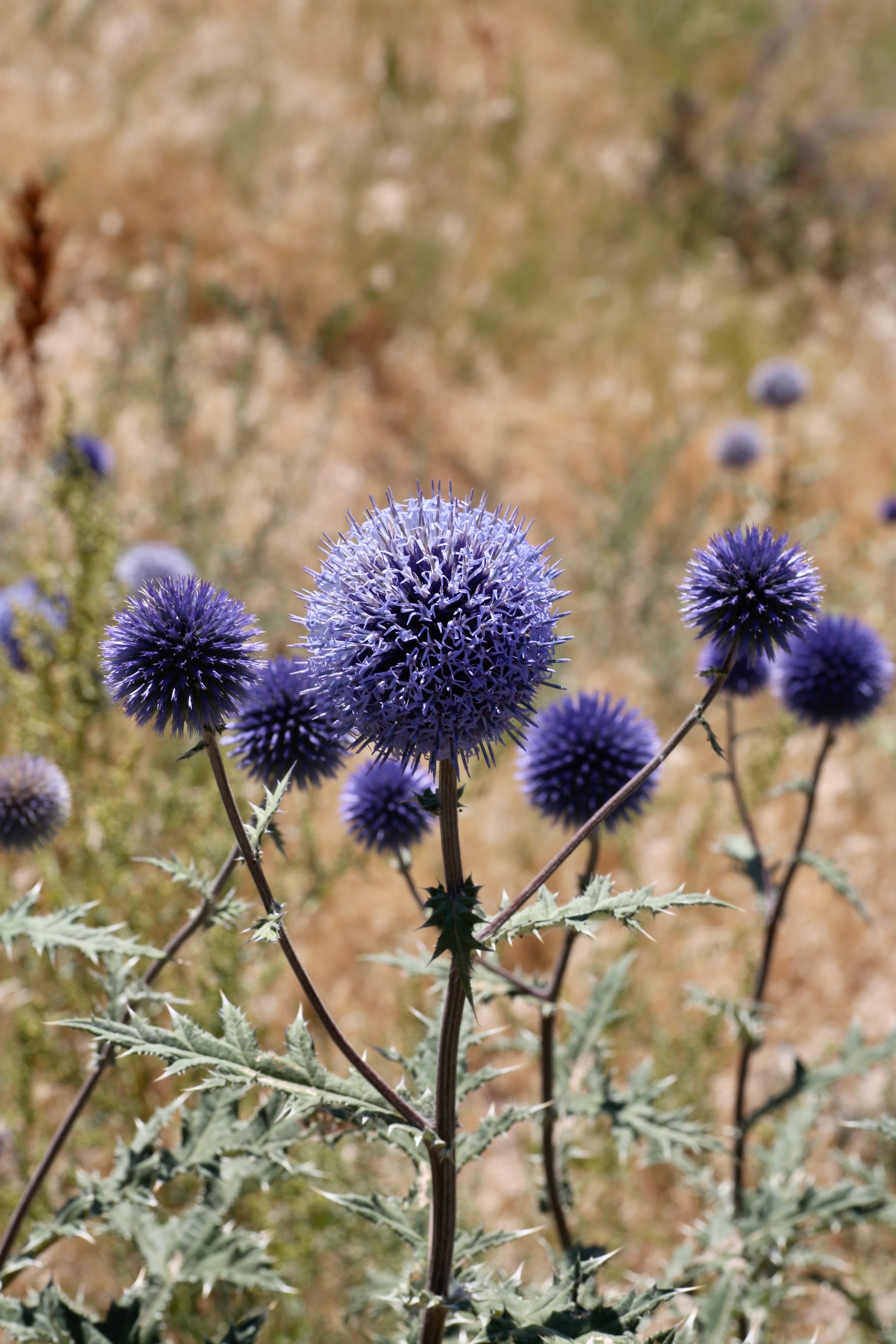

Scientific classification
- Kingdom: Plantae
- Clade: Embryophytes
- Clade: Tracheophytes
- Clade: Spermatophytes
- Clade: Angiosperms
- Clade: Eudicots
- Clade: Asterids
- Order: Asterales
- Family: Asteraceae
- Genus: Echinops
- Species: E. chantavicus

Binomial name
- Echinops chantavicus Trautv.

= Echinops chantavicus =

Species of flowering plant

Echinops chantavicus is a species of flowering plant in the genus Echinops, native to Central Asia.
