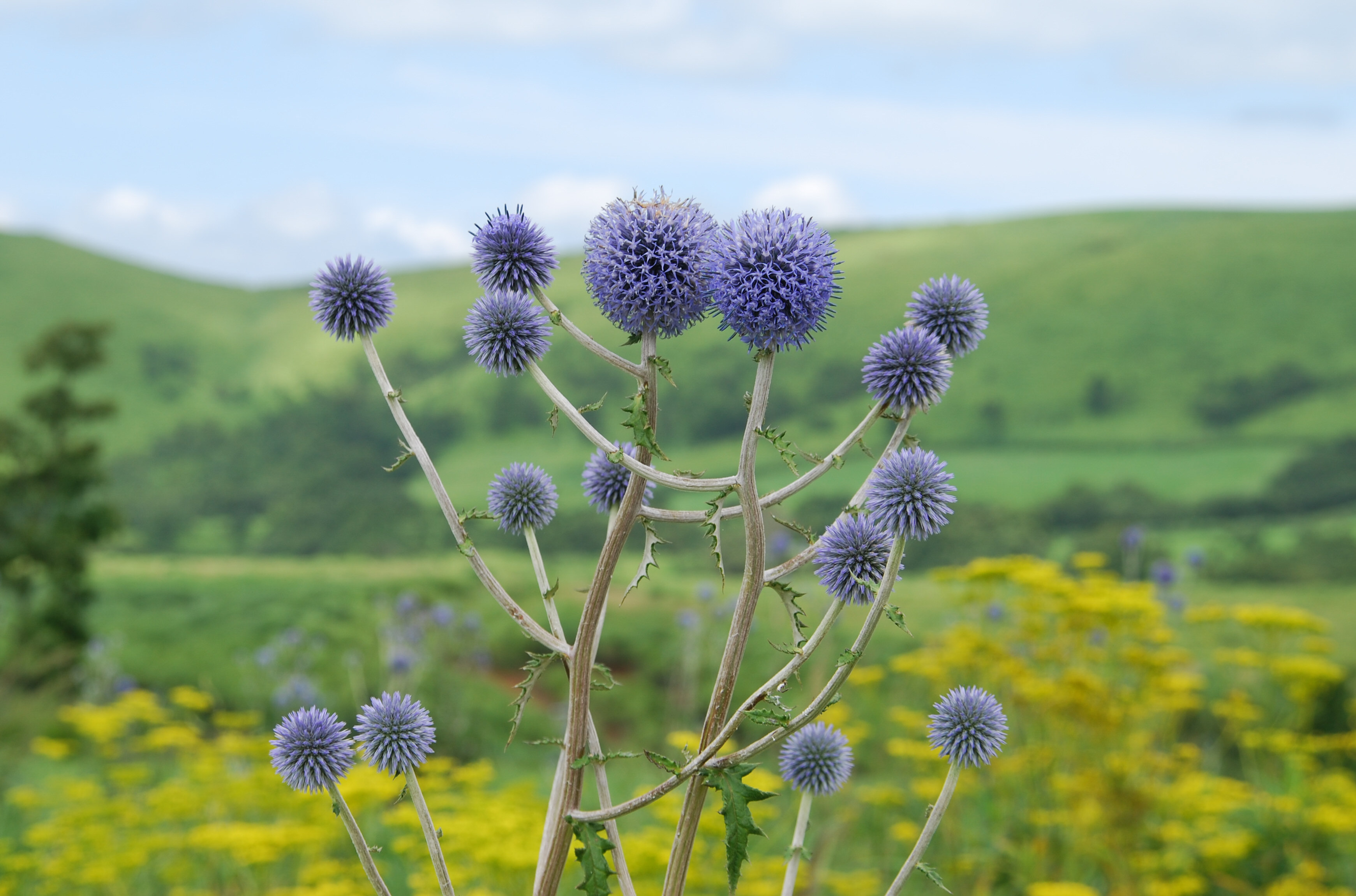
- Echinops setifer in its native habitat at Higotai-park, Kujū highlands near Mount Kujū, Kyushu Japan

Scientific classification
- Kingdom: Plantae
- Clade: Embryophytes
- Clade: Tracheophytes
- Clade: Spermatophytes
- Clade: Angiosperms
- Clade: Eudicots
- Clade: Asterids
- Order: Asterales
- Family: Asteraceae
- Genus: Echinops
- Species: E. setifer

Binomial name
- Echinops setifer Ilyin.

= Echinops setifer =

Species of flowering plant

Echinops setifer is a perennial globe thistle species of flowering plant in the genus Echinops, native to central and southern Japan, Korea and eastern China.
