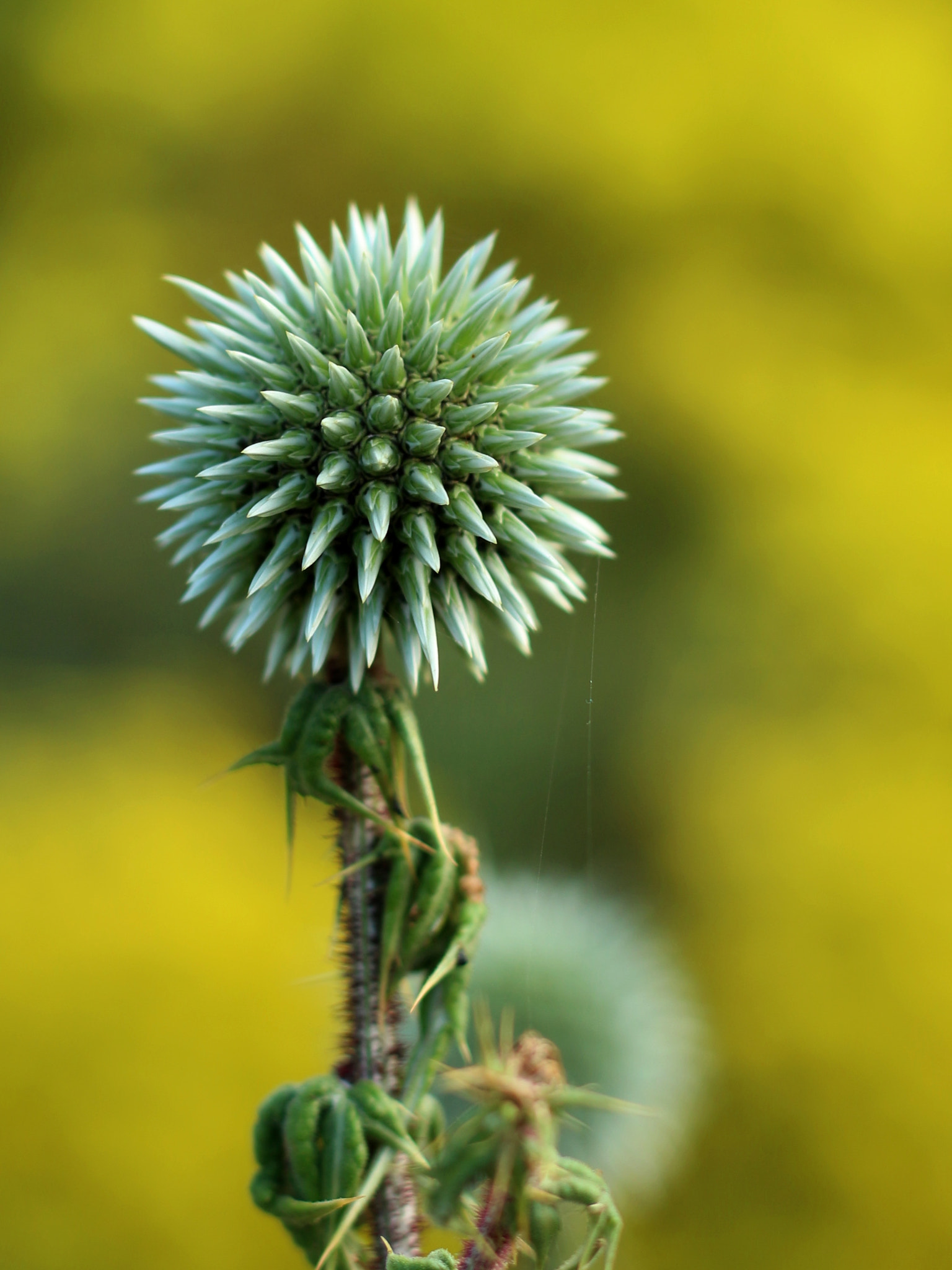

Scientific classification
- Kingdom: Plantae
- Clade: Tracheophytes
- Clade: Angiosperms
- Clade: Eudicots
- Clade: Asterids
- Order: Asterales
- Family: Asteraceae
- Genus: Echinops
- Species: E. polyceras

Binomial name
- Echinops polyceras Boiss.

Synonyms
- Echinops blancheanus Boiss.; Echinops spinosus auct. non L.

= Echinops polyceras =

Species of thistle

Echinops polyceras is a Eurasian species of globe-thistle belonging to the tribe Cardueae within the family Asteraceae.

== Description ==
Echinops polyceras is a hemicryptophyte, its spinescence represented by bracts and leaves. It is non-succulent, and perennial. The leaves are alternately placed, one leaf per node, and rosette. The leaves are dissected, pinnate or bipinnate. Stipule is absent.

Atop each stem is an almost perfectly spherical inflorescence up to 8 cm in diameter, often having radial, long, thorny projections. The florescence comprises dark blue florets. It flowers from March to June. It produces fruits from April to July, and disperses seeds from July to November.

== Range ==
Its range could be described as Irano-Turanian.

== Habitat ==
Its habitat is batha (garrigue, phrygana), desert slopes, hard rock outcrops, and shrub-steppes.

== Ecology ==
Drought resistance: Echinops polyceras is salt resistant and is a glycophyte. It could be synanthropic as well as mostly natural.

== Etymology ==
It is also known by other common names as spiny globe-thistle, and Blanche globe-thistle
