= Echinops sphaerocephalus =

Scientific classification
- Kingdom: Plantae
- Clade: Embryophytes
- Clade: Tracheophytes
- Clade: Spermatophytes
- Clade: Angiosperms
- Clade: Eudicots
- Clade: Asterids
- Order: Asterales
- Family: Asteraceae
- Genus: Echinops
- Species: E. sphaerocephalus

Binomial name
- Echinops sphaerocephalus L.

Synonyms
- Synonymy: Echinops maximus Siev. ex Pall.; Echinops altaicus Hort. ex DC.; Echinops cirsiifolius K.Koch; Echinops cirsiifolius (K.Koch) Grossh.; Echinops erevanensis Mulk.; Echinops horridus Link; Echinops macedonicus Formánek; Echinops major St.-Lag.; Echinops multiflorus Lam.; Echinops paniculatus J.Jacq.; Echinops villosus Hort. ex DC.; Echinops viscosus Rchb.; Echinopus sphaerocephalus (L.) Scop.; Echinops albidus Boiss. & Spruner, syn of subsp. albidus; Echinops taygeteus Boiss. & Heldr., syn of subsp. taygeteus

Species of flowering plant in the daisy family

Echinops sphaerocephalus, known by the common names glandular globe-thistle, great globe-thistle or pale globe-thistle, is a Eurasian species of globe-thistle belonging to the tribe Cardueae within the family Asteraceae.

== Description ==
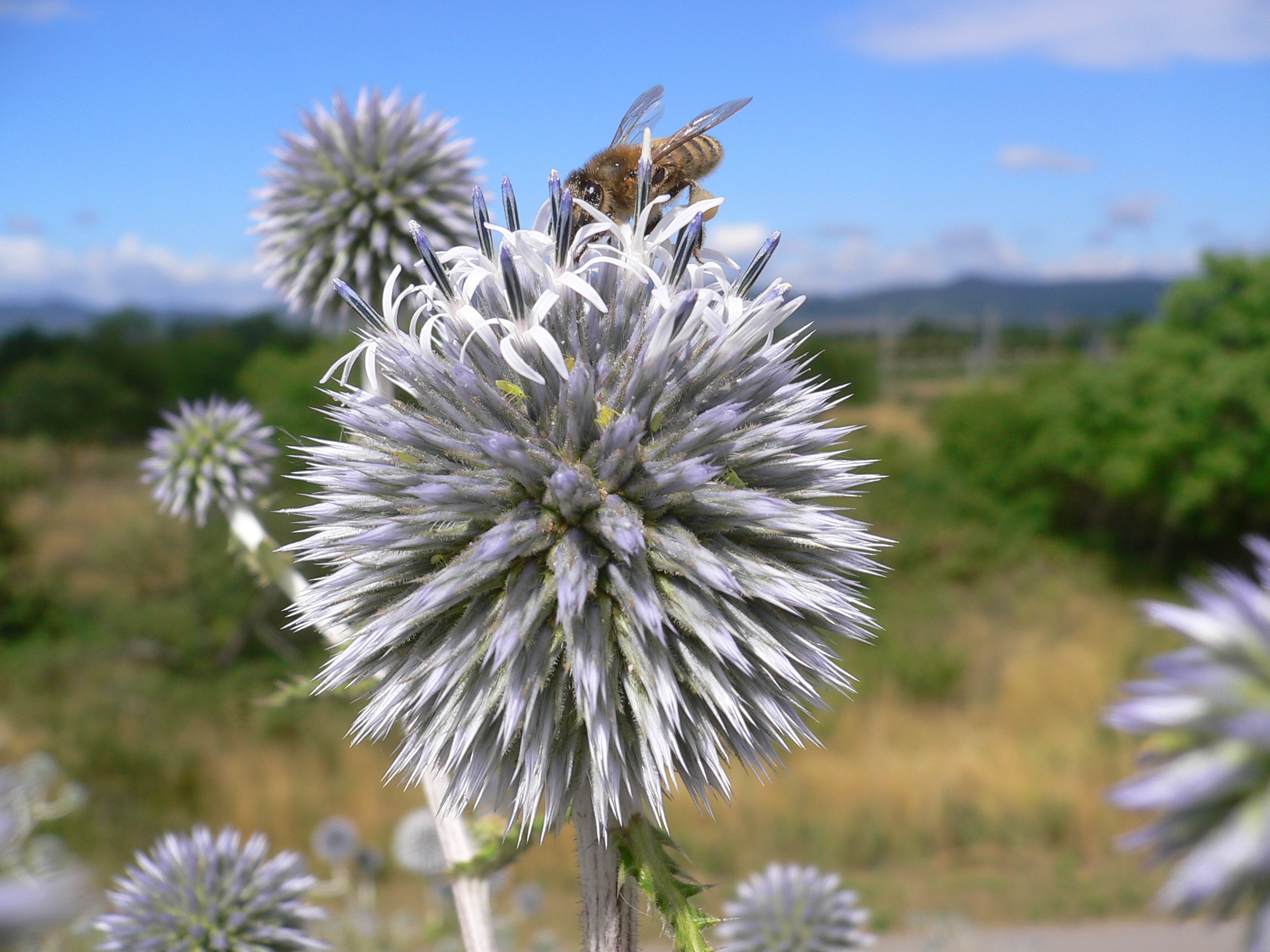
Flowers, with bee

Echinops sphaerocephalus is a glandular, woolly perennial herbaceous plant with an average height of 50–100 centimetres (20–39 in), occasionally reaching 200 cm (80 inches).

Its erect branching, gray, slightly wrinkled and hairy stems bear the occasional large, soft, sharply toothed, sharp-lobed pointed green leaves. They are sticky hairy above, and white woolly below.

Atop each stem is an almost perfectly spherical inflorescence up to 6 cm in diameter, packed with white or blue-gray disc florets. It flowers from June until September.

The flowers are pollinated by insects (usually bees, wasps and butterflies) (entomogamy) and are hermaphrodite (self fertilization or autogamy). The fruits are hairy cylindrical achenes about 7 to 8 mm long. They ripen from September through October. The seeds are dispersed by wind (anemochory).

== Distribution ==
This species is widespread across much of Eurasia but it lives on other continents where it was introduced, including North America where it is a widespread weed. It is very common in the mountains of southern France and southern and central Europe.

== Habitat ==
It grows in sunny, rocky or brushy places in more or less mineral rich soils at an altitude of 0–400 metres (0–1,312 ft) above sea level.

Subspecies

- Echinops sphaerocephalus subsp. albidus (Boiss. et Spruner) Kozu.
- Echinops sphaerocephalus subsp. sphaerocephalus
- Echinops sphaerocephalus subsp. taygeteus (Boiss. & Heldr.) Kožuharov

== Gallery ==
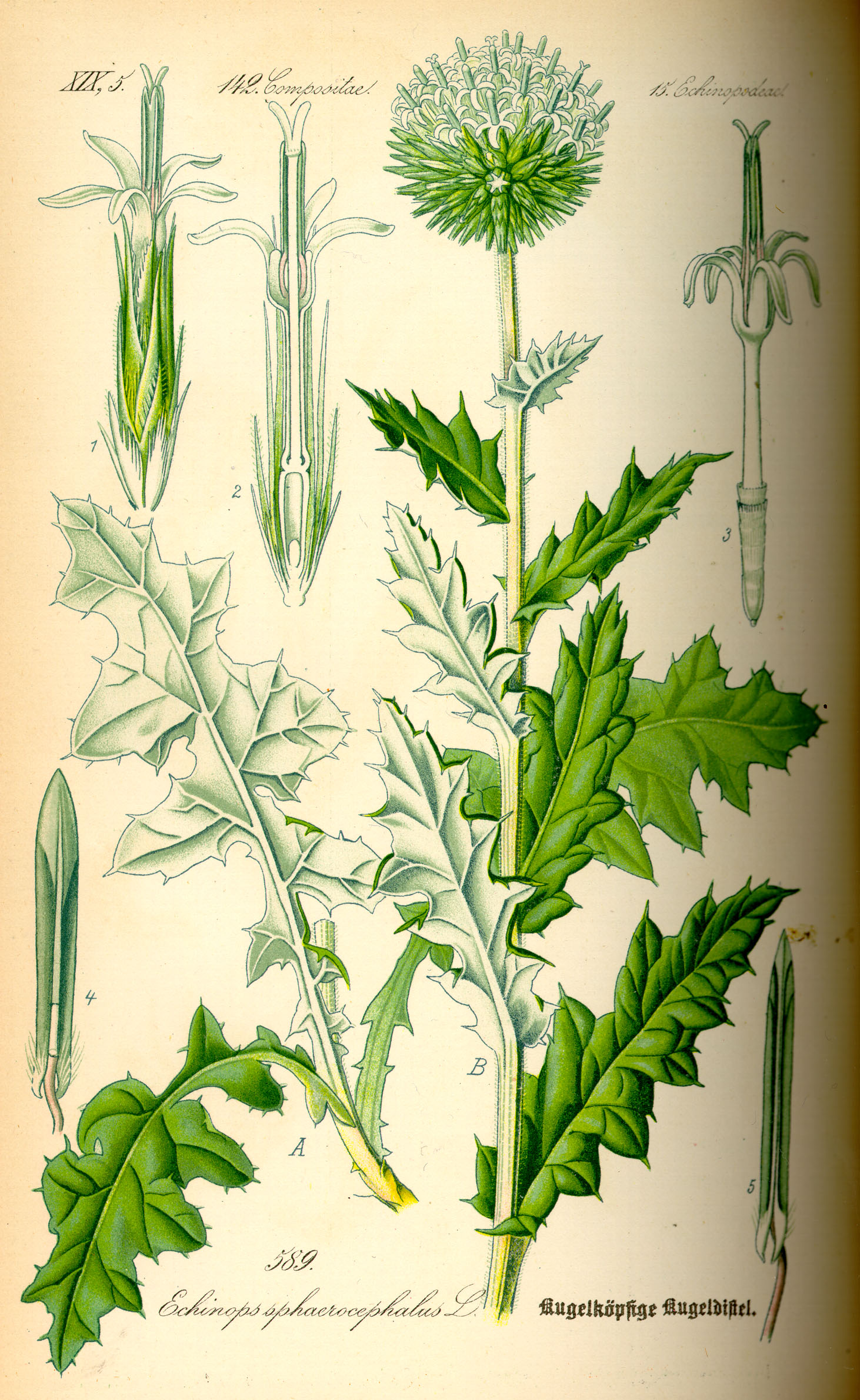
Illustration of Echinops sphaerocephalus from Flora von Deutschland, Österreich und der Schweiz, 1885

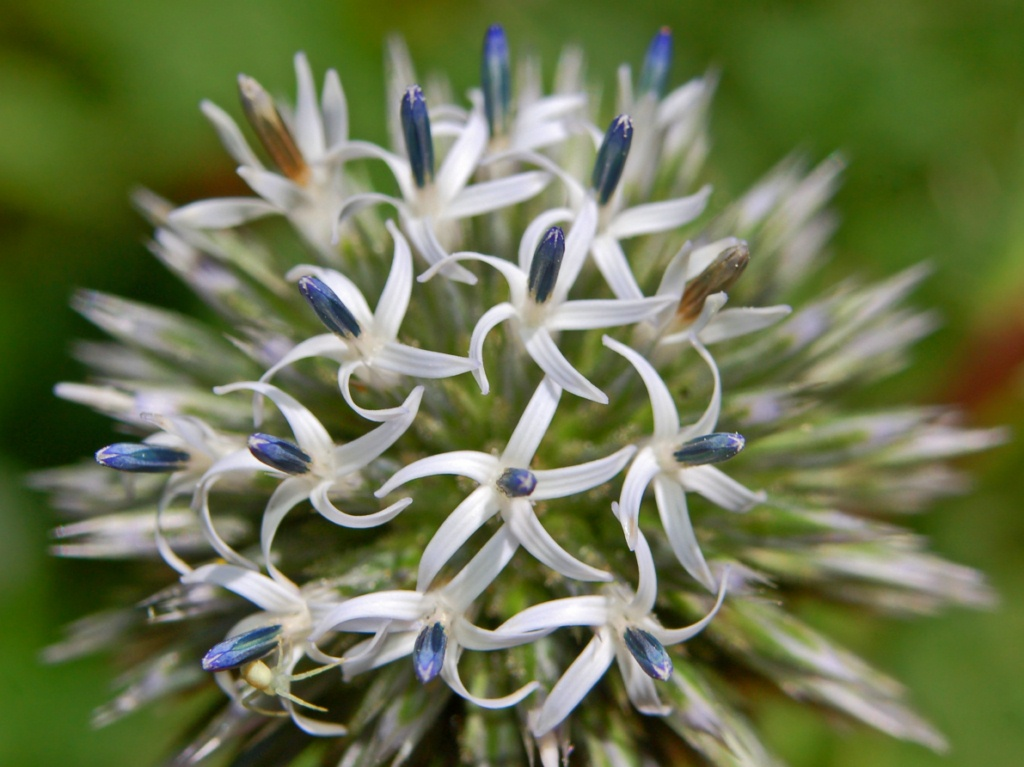
Close-up on flowers of Echinops sphaerocephalus

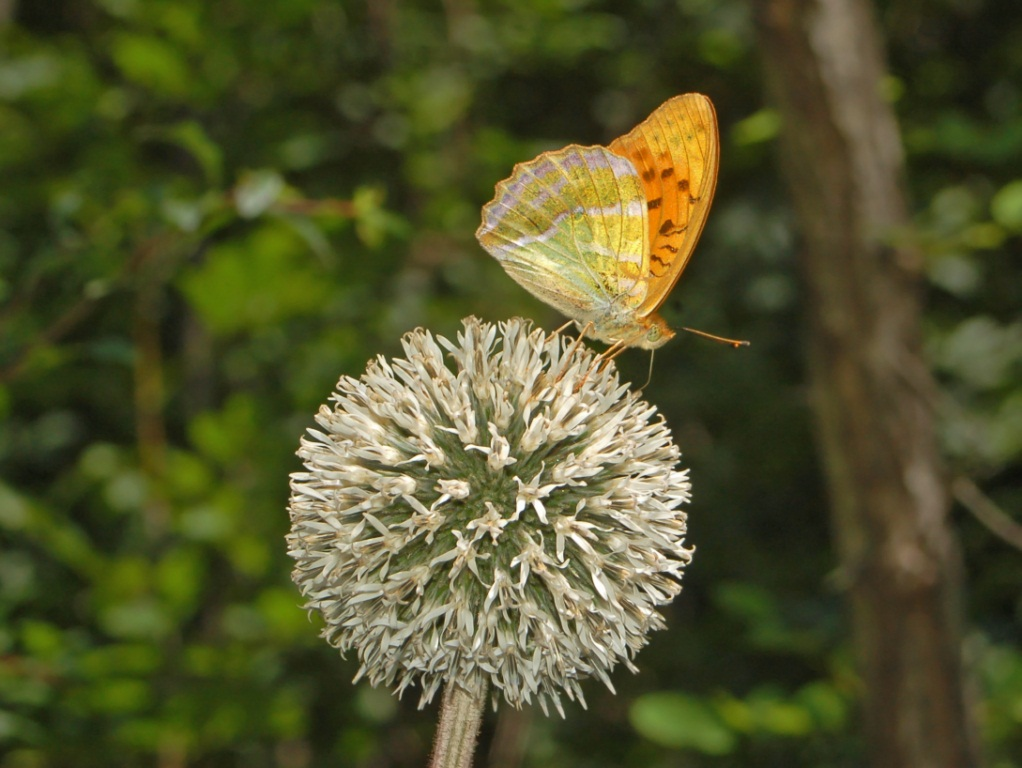
Inflorescence of Echinops sphaerocephalus pollinated by a butterfly

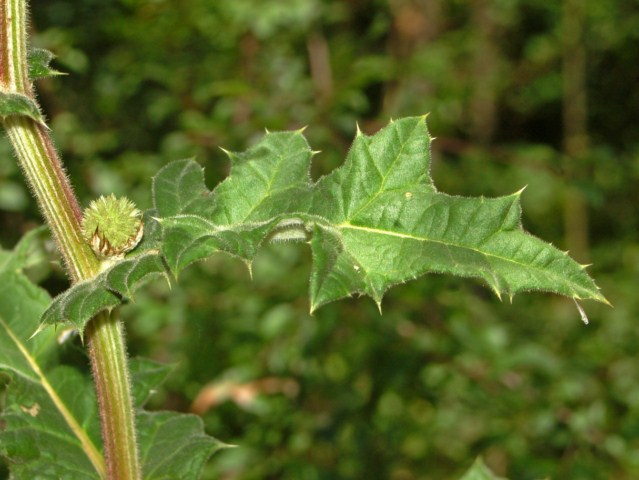
Leaf of Echinops sphaerocephalus
