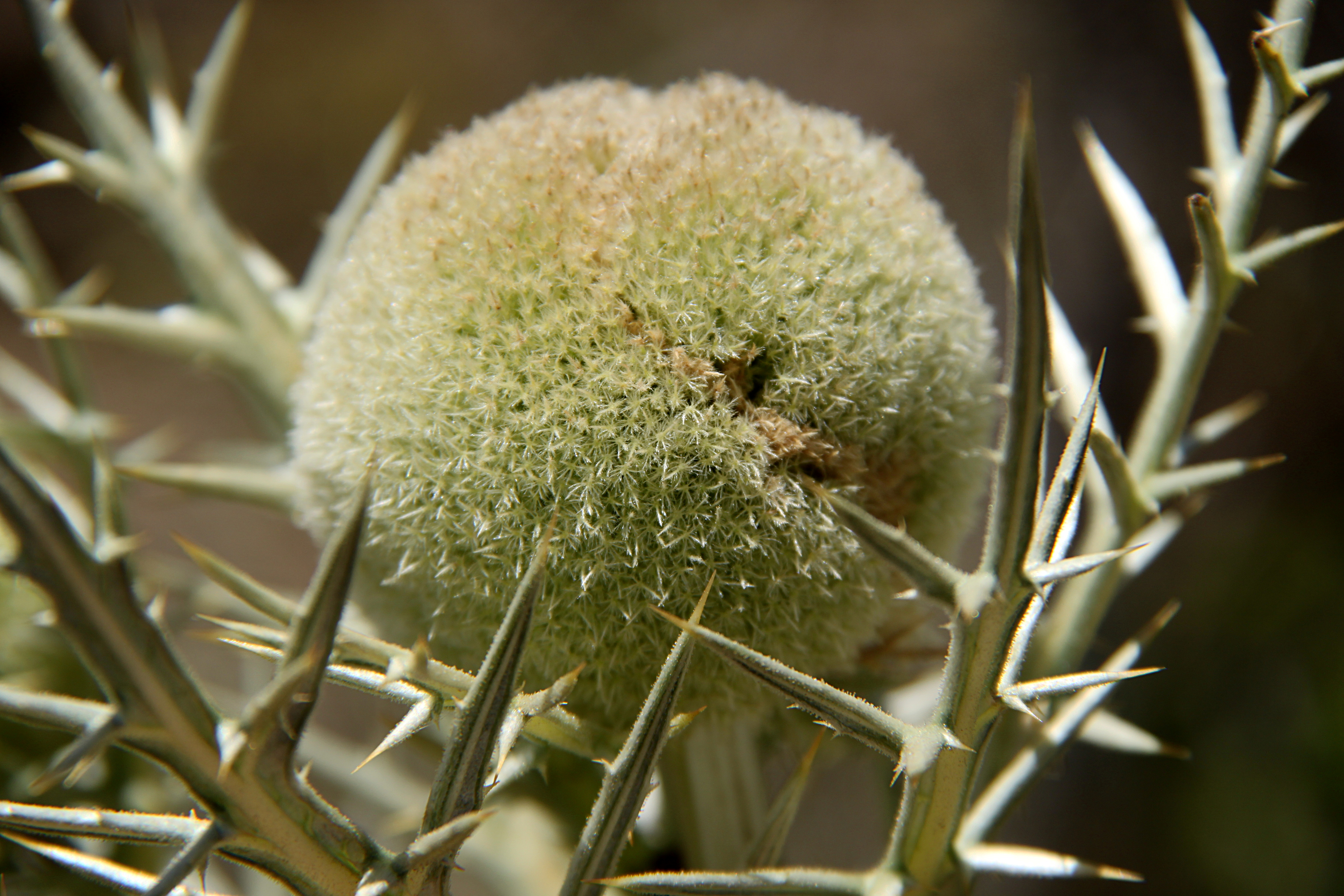
- Young inflorescence of globe thistle Echinops giganteus, approximately 150 cm high, photographed along the Chogoria route, Mount Kenya, at approximately 3100 m altitude

Scientific classification
- Kingdom: Plantae
- Clade: Embryophytes
- Clade: Tracheophytes
- Clade: Spermatophytes
- Clade: Angiosperms
- Clade: Eudicots
- Clade: Asterids
- Order: Asterales
- Family: Asteraceae
- Genus: Echinops
- Species: E. giganteus

Binomial name
- Echinops giganteus A.Rich.

= Echinops giganteus =

Species of flowering plant

Echinops giganteus is a species of plant in the family Asteraceae and is native to Nigeria, Ethiopia and Tanzania.
