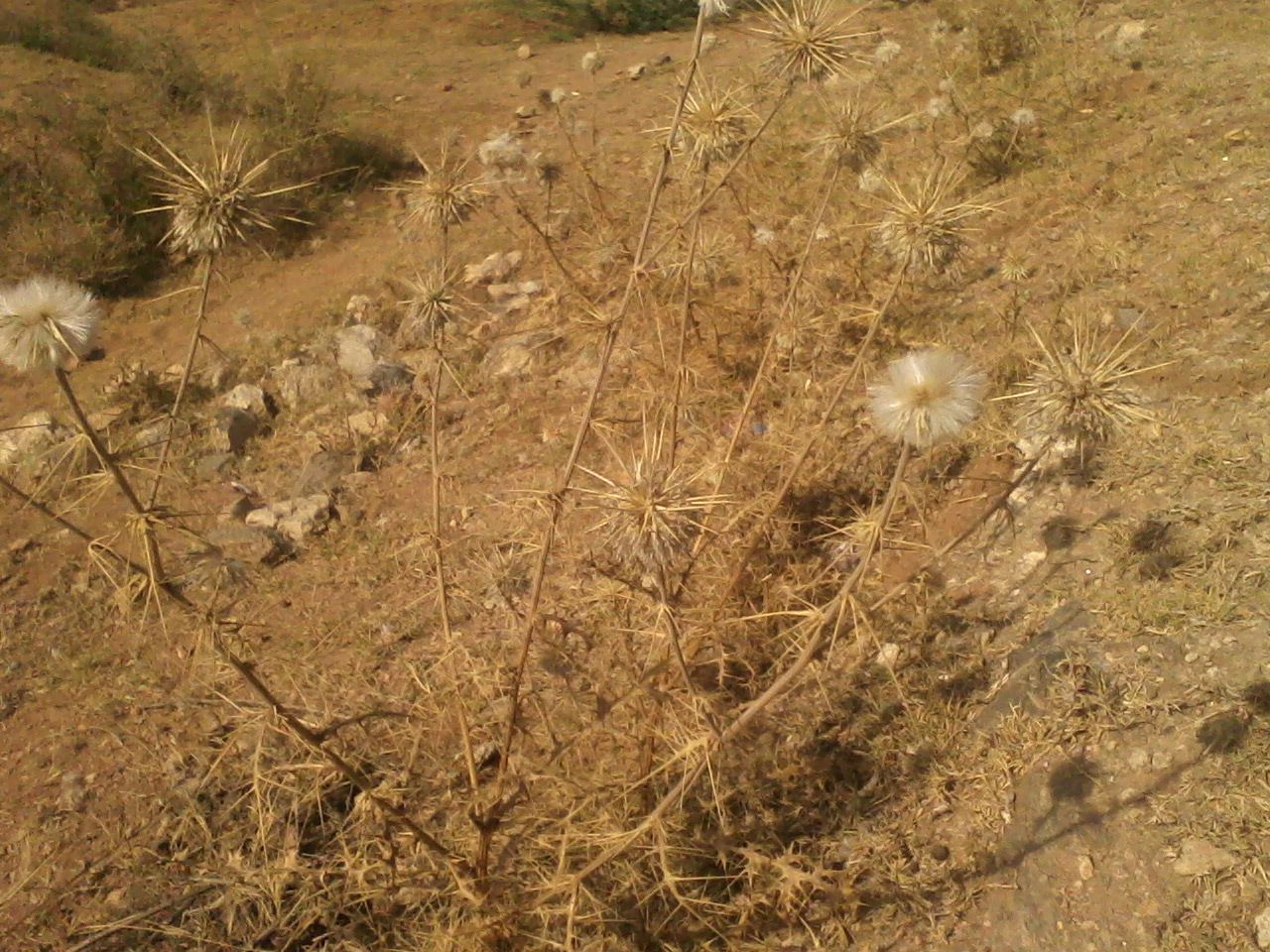

Scientific classification
- Kingdom: Plantae
- Clade: Tracheophytes
- Clade: Angiosperms
- Clade: Eudicots
- Clade: Asterids
- Order: Asterales
- Family: Asteraceae
- Genus: Echinops
- Species: E. echinatus

Binomial name
- Echinops echinatus Roxb.

= Echinops echinatus =

Species of flowering plant

Echinops echinatus, the Indian globe thistle, commonly known as Usnakantaka, is a species of globe thistle, found in India, Pakistan, and Sri Lanka. Indian globe thistle is an erect branched herb about 100 cm high. It has short, stout stems, branching from the base, covered with white cottony hair. Alternately arranged oblong, deeply pinnatifid leaves are 7–12 cm long. Flower heads occur in solitary white spherical balls, 3–5 cm across. Petals of the tiny white disc florets are 5 mm long. Flowers are surrounded by straight, strong, white bristles. Often misidentified with Silybum marianum (L.) Gaertner, it is colloquially known as Camel's thistle.

== Flowering ==
From December to January.

== Chemistry ==
2',5,7- trihydroxy-3.6-dimethoxy flavone-7-O-b-D-galactopyranosyl-[1®4]-O-a-L-rhamnopyranoside is reported from the seeds of Echinops echinatus. 7-hydroxyisoflavone, kaempferol-4'-methylether, kaempferol-7-methylether, myricetin-3-O-a-L-rhamnoside, kaempferol and kaempferol-3-O-a-L-rhamnoside, are reported from the whole plant of Echinops echinatus.

An antiinflammatory active flavanone glycoside 5,7-dihydroxy-8,4'-dimethoxyflavanone-5-O-a-L-rhamnopyranosyl-7-O-b-D-arabinopyranosyl-(1®4)-O-b-D-glucopyranoside A along with a known compound dihydroquercetin-4'-Me ether is also reported from the leaves of Echinops echinatus.

Apigenin, apigenin 7-O-glucoside, and a new acylflavone glucoside named echitin (I) were isolated from Echinops echinatus flowers.

Echinopsidine, a potential MAOI, is found in this species along with the related alkaloids echinopsine and echinozolinone.
