= Echinopsidine =

Chemical compound

Clinical data
- Other names: Echinopsidine Iodide
- Routes of administration: Oral
- ATC code: none

Legal status
- Legal status: In general: ℞ (Prescription only)

Identifiers
- IUPAC name: 1-Methyl-2,3-dihydroquinolin-4-imine
- CAS Number: 2400-75-1 58916-73-7 (hydroiodide)
- PubChem CID: 161462
- ChemSpider: 141825
- UNII: U3WB825N39

Chemical and physical data
- Formula: C_{10}H_{12}N_{2}
- Molar mass: 160.220 g·mol^{−1}

Echinopsidine (Adepren) is an antidepressant that was under development in Bulgaria for the treatment of depression. It increases serotonin, norepinephrine, and dopamine levels in the brain and is believed to act as a monoamine oxidase inhibitor (MAOI). Echinopsidine is found naturally in Echinops echinatus along with the related alkaloids echinopsine and echinozolinone.

== See also ==
- Monoamine oxidase inhibitor
